= Rowing at the 1952 Summer Olympics – Men's eight =

Men's eight at the Games of the XV Olympiad
- Rowing pictogram
- Venue: Meilahti
- Dates: 20–23 July 1952
- Competitors: 126 from 14 nations
- Winning time: 6:25.9

Medalists
1st place, gold medalist(s)		United States: Frank Shakespeare; William Fields; James Dunbar; Richard Murphy; Robert Detweiler; Henry Proctor; Wayne Frye; Edward Stevens; Charles Manring
2nd place, silver medalist(s)		Soviet Union: Yevgeny Brago; Vladimir Rodimushkin; Aleksey Komarov; Igor Borisov; Slava Amiragov; Leonid Gissen; Yevgeny Samsonov; Vladimir Kryukov; Igor Polyakov
3rd place, bronze medalist(s)		Australia: Bob Tinning; Ernest Chapman; Nimrod Greenwood; David Anderson; Geoff Williamson; Mervyn Finlay; Edward Pain; Phil Cayzer; Tom Chessell

The men's eight competition at the 1952 Summer Olympics took place at Meilahti, Finland. It was held from 20 to 23 July. There were 14 boats (126 competitors) from 14 nations, with each nation limited to a single boat in the event. The event was won by the United States, the nation's seventh consecutive and ninth overall gold medal in the men's eight; the Americans had won every time they competed (missing 1908 and 1912). The Soviet Union took silver in its Olympics debut; Australia's bronze was its first medal in the men's eight.

== Background ==
This was the 11th appearance of the event. Rowing had been on the programme in 1896 but was cancelled due to bad weather. The men's eight has been held every time that rowing has been contested, beginning in 1900.

The United States was the dominant nation in the event, with the nation winning the previous six Olympic men's eight competitions (as well as the other two competitions which the United States had entered). Potential challengers included Australia (1950 British Empire champion) and Great Britain (1951 European Rowing Championships winners), but the Americans were heavily favored.

Finland, Romania, and the Soviet Union each made their debut in the event. Canada, Great Britain, and the United States each made their ninth appearance, tied for most among nations to that point.

== Competition format ==
The "eight" event featured nine-person boats, with eight rowers and a coxswain. It was a sweep rowing event, with the rowers each having one oar (and thus each rowing on one side). The course returned to the 2000 metres distance that became the Olympic standard in 1912 (with the exception of 1948).

The 1952 competition featured five rounds: three main rounds (quarterfinals, semifinals, and a final) as well as two repechages, after the quarterfinals and semifinals.

- The 14 boats were divided into 3 heats of 4 or 5 boats each for the quarterfinals. The winner and 2nd place boats in each heat (6 total) advanced to the semifinals, while the remaining boats (8 total) went to the repechage.
- The first repechage had 8 boats. They were placed in 3 heats, with 2 or 3 boats each. The winner of each repechage heat (a tie in one heat led to there being a total of 4 boats advancing) went to the second repechage (not the semifinals), with the other boats (4 total) eliminated.
- The semifinals placed the 6 boats in 2 heats, with 3 boats per heat. The winner of each heat (2 boats total) advanced directly to the final, while the other boats (4 total) competed in the second repechage.
- The second repechage had 8 boats, placed in 3 heats with 2 or 3 boats per heat. The winner of each heat (3 boats) qualified for the final, with all others (5 total) eliminated.
- The final round consisted of a single final for the medals and 4th and 5th places.

== Schedule ==
All times are Eastern European Summer Time (UTC+3)

Date	Time	Round
Sunday, 20 July 1952	9:00	Quarterfinals
Monday, 21 July 1952	9:00; 16:00	First repechage Semifinals
Tuesday, 22 July 1952	9:00	Second repechage
Wednesday, 23 July 1952	19:00	Final

== Results ==
=== Quarterfinals ===
==== Quarterfinal 1 ====
Rank	Rowers	Coxswain	Nation	Time	Notes
1	Ladislav Matetić; Branko Belačić; Vladimir Horvat; Vojko Šeravić; Karlo Pavlenć; Boris Beljak; Stanko Despot; Drago Husjak	Zdenko Bego	Yugoslavia	6:06.9	Q
2	Bob Tinning; Ernest Chapman; Nimrod Greenwood; David Anderson; Geoff Williamson; Mervyn Finlay; Edward Pain; Phil Cayzer	Tom Chessell	Australia	6:07.2	Q
3	Iosif Bergesz; Milivoi Iancovici; Ștefan Konyelicska; Gheorghe Măcinic; Ion Niga; Ștefan Pongratz; Alexandru Rotaru; Ștefan Somogy	Ion Vlăduț	Romania	6:23.0	R
4	Ted Chilcott; Jack Taylor; Bo Westlake; Frank Young; John Sharp; Mervin Kaye; Jack Russell; George McCauley	Norm Rowe	Canada	6:26.5	R
5	Tor Lundsten; Birger Andersson; Eero Lehtovirta; Yrjö Hakoila; Antti Arell; Harry Wikman; Esko Lyytikkä; Klaus Lampi	Toivo Räsänen	Finland	6:28.5	R

==== Quarterfinal 2 ====
Rank	Rowers	Coxswain	Nation	Time	Notes
1	Frank Shakespeare; William Fields; James Dunbar; Richard Murphy; Robert Detweiler; Henry Proctor; Wayne Frye; Edward Stevens	Charles Manring	United States	6:09.0	Q
2	David Macklin; Alastair MacLeod; Nicholas Clack; Roger Sharpley; Edward Worlidge; Brian Lloyd; William Windham; David Jennens	John Hinde	Great Britain	6:15.1	Q
3	Anton Reinartz; Michael Reinartz; Roland Freihoff; Heinz Zünkler; Peter Betz; Stefan Reinartz; Hans Betz; Toni Siebenhaar	Hermann Zander	Germany	6:18.7	R
4	Lennart Andersson; Frank Olsson; John Niklasson; Gösta Adamsson; Ivan Simonsson; Ragnar Ek; Thore Börjesson; Rune Andersson	Sture Baatz	Sweden	6:24.3	R
5	Felisberto Fortes; Albino Simões Neto; Manuel Regala; João Cravo; João Alberto Lemos; Carlos da Benta; João da Paula; Zacarias Andias	José Pinheiro	Portugal	6:30.8	R

==== Quarterfinal 3 ====
Rank	Rowers	Coxswain	Nation	Time	Notes
1	Yevgeny Brago; Vladimir Rodimushkin; Aleksey Komarov; Igor Borisov; Slava Amiragov; Leonid Gissen; Yevgeny Samsonov; Vladimir Kryukov	Igor Polyakov	Soviet Union	6:10.2	Q
2	István Sándor; Csaba Kovács; Miklós Zágon; Tibor Nádas; Rezső Riheczky; Pál Bakos; László Marton; Béla Zsitnik	Róbert Zimonyi	Hungary	6:13.6	Q
3	Albino Baldan; Savino Dalla Puppa; Alberto Bozzato; Ferdinando Smerghetto; Montanino Nuvoli; Dino Nardin; Ottorino Enzo; Piero Attorrese	Sergio Ghiatto	Italy	6:17.0	R
4	Bjørn Stybert; Preben Hoch; Mogens Snogdahl; Jørn Snogdahl; Helge Muxoll Schrøder; Björn Brönnum; Leif Hermansen; Ole Scavenius Jensen	John Vilhelmsen	Denmark	6:17.9	R

=== First repechage ===
==== First repechage heat 1 ====
Rank	Rowers	Coxswain	Nation	Time	Notes
1	Bjørn Stybert; Preben Hoch; Mogens Snogdahl; Jørn Snogdahl; Helge Muxoll Schrøder; Björn Brönnum; Leif Hermansen; Ole Scavenius Jensen	John Vilhelmsen	Denmark	6:17.8	Q
2	Iosif Bergesz; Milivoi Iancovici; Ștefan Konyelicska; Gheorghe Măcinic; Ion Niga; Ștefan Pongratz; Alexandru Rotaru; Ștefan Somogy	Ion Vlăduț	Romania	6:20.7	
3	Felisberto Fortes; Albino Simões Neto; Manuel Regala; João Cravo; João Alberto Lemos; Carlos da Benta; João da Paula; Zacarias Andias	José Pinheiro	Portugal	6:25.3	

==== First repechage heat 2 ====
Rank	Rowers	Coxswain	Nation	Time	Notes
1	Anton Reinartz; Michael Reinartz; Roland Freihoff; Heinz Zünkler; Peter Betz; Stefan Reinartz; Hans Betz; Toni Siebenhaar	Hermann Zander	Germany	6:15.1	Q
2	Albino Baldan; Savino Dalla Puppa; Alberto Bozzato; Ferdinando Smerghetto; Montanino Nuvoli; Dino Nardin; Ottorino Enzo; Piero Attorrese	Sergio Ghiatto	Italy	6:15.8	
3	Tor Lundsten; Birger Andersson; Eero Lehtovirta; Yrjö Hakoila; Antti Arell; Harry Wikman; Esko Lyytikkä; Klaus Lampi	Toivo Räsänen	Finland	6:28.4	

==== First repechage heat 3 ====
The finish between these two boats was so close that even the photo finish could not separate them. Both boats advanced.

Rank	Rowers	Coxswain	Nation	Time	Notes
1	Ted Chilcott; Jack Taylor; Bo Westlake; Frank Young; John Sharp; Mervin Kaye; Jack Russell; George McCauley	Norm Rowe	Canada	6:25.9	Q
1	Lennart Andersson; Frank Olsson; John Niklasson; Gösta Adamsson; Ivan Simonsson; Ragnar Ek; Thore Börjesson; Rune Andersson	Sture Baatz	Sweden	6:25.9	Q

=== Semifinals ===
==== Semifinal 1 ====
Rank	Rowers	Coxswain	Nation	Time	Notes
1	David Macklin; Alastair MacLeod; Nicholas Clack; Roger Sharpley; Edward Worlidge; Brian Lloyd; William Windham; David Jennens	John Hinde	Great Britain	6:32.4	Q
2	Ladislav Matetić; Branko Belačić; Vladimir Horvat; Vojko Šeravić; Karlo Pavlenć; Boris Beljak; Stanko Despot; Drago Husjak	Zdenko Bego	Yugoslavia	6:33.5	R
3	István Sándor; Csaba Kovács; Miklós Zágon; Tibor Nádas; Rezső Riheczky; Pál Bakos; László Marton; Béla Zsitnik	Róbert Zimonyi	Hungary	6:37.4	R

==== Semifinal 2 ====
Rank	Rowers	Coxswain	Nation	Time	Notes
1	Frank Shakespeare; William Fields; James Dunbar; Richard Murphy; Robert Detweiler; Henry Proctor; Wayne Frye; Edward Stevens	Charles Manring	United States	6:32.1	Q
2	Yevgeny Brago; Vladimir Rodimushkin; Aleksey Komarov; Igor Borisov; Slava Amiragov; Leonid Gissen; Yevgeny Samsonov; Vladimir Kryukov	Igor Polyakov	Soviet Union	6:44.0	R
3	Bob Tinning; Ernest Chapman; Nimrod Greenwood; David Anderson; Geoff Williamson; Mervyn Finlay; Edward Pain; Phil Cayzer	Tom Chessell	Australia	6:44.5	R

=== Second repechage ===
==== Second repechage heat 1 ====
Rank	Rowers	Coxswain	Nation	Time	Notes
1	Bob Tinning; Ernest Chapman; Nimrod Greenwood; David Anderson; Geoff Williamson; Mervyn Finlay; Edward Pain; Phil Cayzer	Tom Chessell	Australia	6:09.6	Q
2	Ladislav Matetić; Branko Belačić; Vladimir Horvat; Vojko Šeravić; Karlo Pavlenć; Boris Beljak; Stanko Despot; Drago Husjak	Zdenko Bego	Yugoslavia	6:12.0	
3	Lennart Andersson; Frank Olsson; John Niklasson; Gösta Adamsson; Ivan Simonsson; Ragnar Ek; Thore Börjesson; Rune Andersson	Sture Baatz	Sweden	6:28.1	

==== Second repechage heat 2 ====
Rank	Rowers	Coxswain	Nation	Time	Notes
1	Yevgeny Brago; Vladimir Rodimushkin; Aleksey Komarov; Igor Borisov; Slava Amiragov; Leonid Gissen; Yevgeny Samsonov; Vladimir Kryukov	Igor Polyakov	Soviet Union	6:10.6	Q
2	István Sándor; Csaba Kovács; Miklós Zágon; Tibor Nádas; Rezső Riheczky; Pál Bakos; László Marton; Béla Zsitnik	Róbert Zimonyi	Hungary	6:15.4	
3	Bjørn Stybert; Preben Hoch; Mogens Snogdahl; Jørn Snogdahl; Helge Muxoll Schrøder; Björn Brönnum; Leif Hermansen; Ole Scavenius Jensen	John Vilhelmsen	Denmark	6:16.0	

==== Second repechage heat 3 ====
Rank	Rowers	Coxswain	Nation	Time	Notes
1	Anton Reinartz; Michael Reinartz; Roland Freihoff; Heinz Zünkler; Peter Betz; Stefan Reinartz; Hans Betz; Toni Siebenhaar	Hermann Zander	Germany	6:19.3	Q
2	Ted Chilcott; Jack Taylor; Bo Westlake; Frank Young; John Sharp; Mervin Kaye; Jack Russell; George McCauley	Norm Rowe	Canada	6:24.8	

=== Final ===
Rank	Rowers	Coxswain	Nation	Time
1st place, gold medalist(s)	Frank Shakespeare; William Fields; James Dunbar; Richard Murphy; Robert Detweiler; Henry Proctor; Wayne Frye; Edward Stevens	Charles Manring	United States	6:25.9
2nd place, silver medalist(s)	Yevgeny Brago; Vladimir Rodimushkin; Aleksey Komarov; Igor Borisov; Slava Amiragov; Leonid Gissen; Yevgeny Samsonov; Vladimir Kryukov	Igor Polyakov	Soviet Union	6:31.2
3rd place, bronze medalist(s)	Bob Tinning; Ernest Chapman; Nimrod Greenwood; David Anderson; Geoff Williamson; Mervyn Finlay; Edward Pain; Phil Cayzer	Tom Chessell	Australia	6:33.1
4	David Macklin; Alastair MacLeod; Nicholas Clack; Roger Sharpley; Edward Worlidge; Brian Lloyd; William Windham; David Jennens	John Hinde	Great Britain	6:34.8
5	Anton Reinartz; Michael Reinartz; Roland Freihoff; Heinz Zünkler; Peter Betz; Stefan Reinartz; Hans Betz; Toni Siebenhaar	Hermann Zander	Germany	6:42.8

== Results summary ==
The following rowers took part:

Rank	Rowers	Coxswain	Country
1st place, gold medalist(s)	Frank Shakespeare; William Fields; James Dunbar; Richard Murphy; Robert Detweiler; Henry Proctor; Wayne Frye; Edward Stevens	Charles Manring	United States
2nd place, silver medalist(s)	Yevgeny Brago; Vladimir Rodimushkin; Aleksey Komarov; Igor Borisov; Slava Amiragov; Leonid Gissen; Yevgeny Samsonov; Vladimir Kryukov	Igor Polyakov	Soviet Union
3rd place, bronze medalist(s)	Bob Tinning; Ernest Chapman; Nimrod Greenwood; David Anderson; Geoff Williamson; Mervyn Finlay; Edward Pain; Phil Cayzer	Tom Chessell	Australia
	David Macklin; Alastair MacLeod; Nicholas Clack; Roger Sharpley; Edward Worlidge; Brian Lloyd; William Windham; David Jennens	John Hinde	Great Britain
	Anton Reinartz; Michael Reinartz; Roland Freihoff; Heinz Zünkler; Peter Betz; Stefan Reinartz; Hans Betz; Toni Siebenhaar	Hermann Zander	Germany
	Ladislav Matetić; Branko Belačić; Vladimir Horvat; Vojko Šeravić; Karlo Pavlenć; Boris Beljak; Stanko Despot; Drago Husjak	Zdenko Bego	Yugoslavia
	István Sándor; Csaba Kovács; Miklós Zágon; Tibor Nádas; Rezső Riheczky; Pál Bakos; László Marton; Béla Zsitnik	Róbert Zimonyi	Hungary
	Ted Chilcott; Jack Taylor; Bo Westlake; Frank Young; John Sharp; Mervin Kaye; Jack Russell; George McCauley	Norm Rowe	Canada
	Lennart Andersson; Frank Olsson; John Niklasson; Gösta Adamsson; Ivan Simonsson; Ragnar Ek; Thore Börjesson; Rune Andersson	Sture Baatz	Sweden
	Bjørn Stybert; Preben Hoch; Mogens Snogdahl; Jørn Snogdahl; Helge Muxoll Schrøder; Björn Brönnum; Leif Hermansen; Ole Scavenius Jensen	John Vilhelmsen	Denmark
	Iosif Bergesz; Milivoi Iancovici; Ștefan Konyelicska; Gheorghe Măcinic; Ion Niga; Ștefan Pongratz; Alexandru Rotaru; Ștefan Somogy	Ion Vlăduț	Romania
	Albino Baldan; Savino Dalla Puppa; Alberto Bozzato; Ferdinando Smerghetto; Montanino Nuvoli; Dino Nardin; Ottorino Enzo; Piero Attorrese	Sergio Ghiatto	Italy
	Felisberto Fortes; Albino Simões Neto; Manuel Regala; João Cravo; João Alberto Lemos; Carlos da Benta; João da Paula; Zacarias Andias	José Pinheiro	Portugal
	Tor Lundsten; Birger Andersson; Eero Lehtovirta; Yrjö Hakoila; Antti Arell; Harry Wikman; Esko Lyytikkä; Klaus Lampi	Toivo Räsänen	Finland
