= Yugoslavia at the 1952 Summer Olympics =

- Flag of FPR Yugoslavia
- IOC code: YUG
- NOC: Yugoslav Olympic Committee

in Helsinki
- Competitors: 87 (77 men, 10 women) in 11 sports
- Flag bearer: Oto Rebula
- Medals Ranked 21st: Gold 1 Silver 2 Bronze 0 Total 3

Summer Olympics appearances (overview)
- 1920; 1924; 1928; 1932; 1936; 1948; 1952; 1956; 1960; 1964; 1968; 1972; 1976; 1980; 1984; 1988; 1992; 1996; 2000

Other related appearances
- Serbia (1912, 2008–); Croatia (1992–); Slovenia (1992–); Bosnia and Herzegovina (1992 S–); Independent Olympic Participants (1992 S); North Macedonia (1996–); Serbia and Montenegro (1996–2006); Montenegro (2008–); Kosovo (2016–)

Athletes from the Federal People's Republic of Yugoslavia competed at the 1952 Summer Olympics in Helsinki, Finland. 87 competitors, 77 men and 10 women, took part in 48 events in 11 sports.

== Medalists ==
| Medal | Name | Sport | Event |
|---|---|---|---|
| Gold | Duje Bonačić; Velimir Valenta; Mate Trojanović; Petar Šegvić | Rowing | Men's Coxless Four |
| Silver | Vladimir Beara; Branko Stanković; Tomislav Crnković; Zlatko Čajkovski; Ivan Horvat; Vujadin Boškov; Tihomir Ognjanov; Rajko Mitić; Bernard Vukas; Stjepan Bobek; Branko Zebec; Dušan Cvetković; Milorad Diskić; Ratko Čolić; Slavko Luštica; Zdravko Rajkov; Vladimir Čonč; Vladimir Firm | Football | Men's Team Competition |
| Silver | Zdravko Kovačić; Veljko Bakašun; Ivo Štakula; Boško Vuksanović; Ivica Kurtini; Lovro Radonjić; Zdravko Ježić; Juraj Amšel; Vlado Ivković; Marko Brainović; Dragoslav D. Šiljak | Water Polo | Men's Team Competition |

== Rowing ==
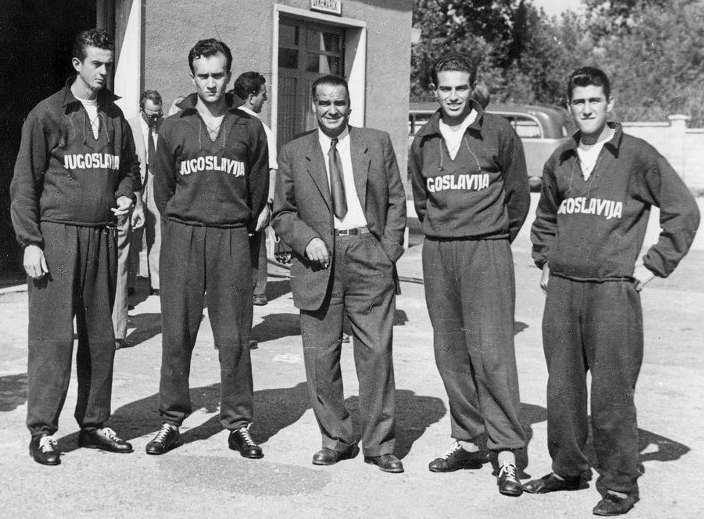
Coxless four gold medalists Petar Šegvić, Mate Trojanović, Velimir Valenta and Duje Bonačić with their coach Davor Jelaska

Yugoslavia had 13 male rowers participate in two out of seven rowing events in 1952.

Men's coxless four

- Duje Bonačić
- Velimir Valenta
- Mate Trojanović
- Petar Šegvić

Men's eight

- Ladislav Matetić
- Branko Belačić
- Vladimir Horvat
- Vojko Šeravić
- Karlo Pavlenč
- Boris Beljak
- Stanko Despot
- Drago Husjak
- Zdenko Bego (cox)

== Shooting ==
Six shooters represented Yugoslavia in 1952.

50 m pistol

- Edvard Delorenco
- Rudolf Vuk

300 m rifle, three positions

- Jovan Kratohvil
- Stjepan Prauhardt

50 m rifle, three positions

- Zlatko Mašek

50 m rifle, prone

- Zlatko Mašek

== Swimming ==
Men

Ranks given are within the heat.

| Athlete | Event | Heat | | Semifinal | | Final | |
| Athlete | Event | Time | Rank | Time | Rank | Time | Rank |
|---|---|---|---|---|---|---|---|
| Boris Škanata | 100 m backstroke | 1:07.5 | 2 Q | 1:07.8 | 2 Q | 1:08.1 | 7 |
| Blago Barbieri | 200 m breaststroke | 2:47.3 | 5 | Did not advance | | | |
| Nikola Trojanović | 200 m breaststroke | 2:42.4 | 4 | 2:41.8 | 7 | Did not advance | |
