= 1955 European Rowing Championships (men) =

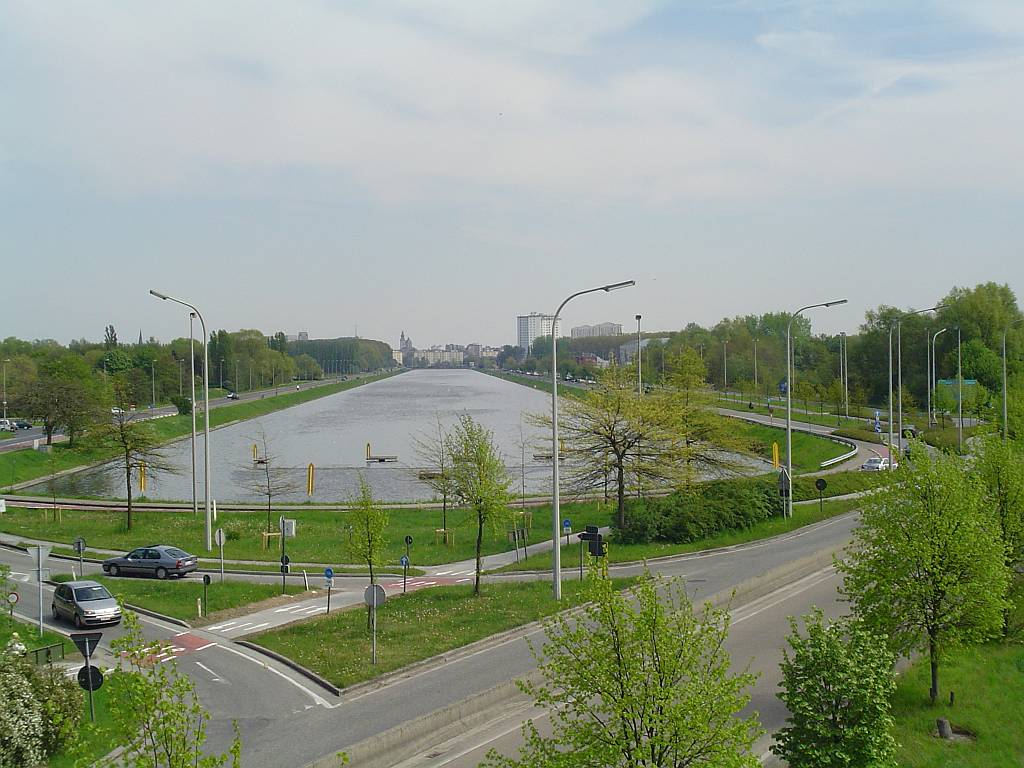
- The Watersportbaan in 2004
- Venue: Watersportbaan
- Location: Ghent, Belgium
- Dates: 25–28 August 1955
- Competitors: c. 400 from 21 nations

The 1955 European Rowing Championships for men were rowing championships held in the Belgian city of Ghent. The venue was the Watersportbaan, which was built for these championships and was part of Belgium's preparation for their bid to host the 1960 Summer Olympics. The competition for women had been held earlier in the month in Bucharest. The event in Ghent was held from 25 to 28 August and they competed in all seven Olympic boat classes (M1x, M2x, M2-, M2+, M4-, M4+, M8+). Some 400 competitors from 21 countries competed.

== German participation ==
The National Olympic Committee of the German Democratic Republic was granted provisional membership in 1955 and as a next step, East Germany tried to gain membership of the individual sporting organisations that participated in Olympic disciplines. In July 1955, the East German rowing association applied for a license from FISA, the International Rowing Federation, to be able to nominate their rowers at the European Championships in Bucharest (women) and Ghent (men). FISA's response was that the next congress, to be held just prior to the championships in Ghent, will decide on the matter. Therefore, East German teams could not compete in 1955. At the congress, East Germany was unanimously accepted as a new member.

West Germany was represented in Ghent in six boat classes.

== Romania ==
A Romanian crew won gold with the coxless four. This was the country's first gold medal in international rowing.

== Medal summary – men's events ==
Event	Gold		Silver		Bronze	
Event	Country & rowers	Time	Country & rowers	Time	Country & rowers	Time
M1x	Poland; Teodor Kocerka		Soviet Union; Yuriy Tyukalov		Netherlands; Rob van Mesdag	
M2x	Soviet Union; Heorhiy Zhylin; Ihor Yemchuk		Czechoslovakia; Albert Krajmer; František Reich		Yugoslavia; Perica Vlašić; Nikola Lucsin	
M2-	Soviet Union; Igor Buldakov; Viktor Ivanov		Belgium; Michel Knuysen; Bob Baetens		Argentina; Jorge Glusman; Eduardo Glusman	
M2+	Switzerland; Gottfried Kottmann; Rolf Streuli; Walter Ludin (cox)		Finland; Veli Lehtelä; Toimi Pitkänen; Matti Niemi (cox)		France; Claude Martin; Édouard Leguery; Daniel Forget (cox)	
M4-	Romania; Ştefan Somogyi; Anton Senceac; Radu Nicolae; Ştefan Pongratz		Denmark; Ib Jensen; Bent Brönnum; Leif Hermansen; Björn Brönnum		Finland; Jorma Salonen; Reino Poutanen; Eero Lehtovirta; Kauko Hänninen	
M4+	Argentina; Juan Ecker; Emilio Czerner; Jorge Schneider; Alfredo Czerner; Gerardo Santos (cox)		Sweden; Evert Gunnarsson; Ivar Aronsson; Gösta Eriksson; Olle Larsson; Bertil Göransson (cox)		Finland; Jorma Salonen; Reino Poutanen; Eero Lehtovirta; Kauko Hänninen; Rolf Tuominen (cox)	
M8+	Soviet Union; Yevgeniy Brago; Vladimir Rodimushkin; Slava Amiragov; Yevgeny Samsonov; Igor Borisov; Leonid Gissen; Aleksey Komarov; Vladimir Kryukov; Vladimir Petrov (cox)		Sweden; Evert Gunnarsson; Ivar Aronsson; Rune Andersson; Lennart Hansson; Bo Gustavsson; Gösta Eriksson; Olle Larsson; Bertil Göransson (cox)		West Germany; Hans Betz; Günter Harms; Roland Freihoff; Heinz Zünkler; Hans Wielath; Walter Gisske; Herbert Gossel; Hermann Semrau; Friedel Iserloh (cox)	
