= Reinartz =

Reinartz is a surname. Notable people with the surname include:

- Antoine Reinartz (born 1985), French actor
- Anton Reinartz (1926–2002), German rower
- Hanns Reinartz (1911–1988), German musician and conductor
- Michael Reinartz (1928–2001), German rower
- Stefan Reinartz (born 1989), German footballer
- Stefan Reinartz (rower) (1925–2007), German rower
- Werner Reinartz (born 1963), German economist
