= 1953 European Rowing Championships =

- Venue: Lake Bagsværd
- Location: Copenhagen, Denmark
- Dates: 13 August 1953 (women) followed by the event for men

The 1953 European Rowing Championships were rowing championships held on Lake Bagsværd near the Danish capital Copenhagen. Men competed in all seven Olympic boat classes (M1x, M2x, M2-, M2+, M4-, M4+, M8+). The regatta was also the third test event for international women's rowing organised by the International Rowing Federation (FISA), with nine countries competing in four boat classes (W1x, W2x, W4+, W8+) over the shorter race distance of 1,000 m (men competed over 2,000 m). The purpose of the test event was to see whether women's rowing should formally become part of the FISA-organised European Rowing Championships.

== Women's test event ==
The women’s test event was the third regatta organised to check whether international women's rowing was viable. Four countries had competed at the previous test events (Mâcon in 1951 and Amsterdam in 1952): France, Great Britain, the Netherlands, and Denmark. In 1953, the four initial countries were joined by Norway, Finland, Austria, West Germany and Poland. The same four boat classes (W1x, W2x, W4+, W8+) as in the two previous years were contested.

There were only three boats entered for the eight event and a single race decided the medals: the Netherlands won gold, silver went to Great Britain, and the Danish crew was awarded bronze.

As part of the 1953 European Championships, FISA held a congress in Copenhagen. It was decided for women's rowing to become an official part of the European Championships, with the first full event to be held as part of the 1954 European Rowing Championships in Amsterdam. In addition, a fifth boat class was added to the regatta from 1954: coxed quad scull.

== Medal summary – men's events ==
Event	Gold		Silver		Bronze	
Event	Country & rowers	Time	Country & rowers	Time	Country & rowers	Time
M1x	Yugoslavia; Perica Vlašić		Poland; Teodor Kocerka		France; Achille Giovannoni	
M2x	Switzerland; Peter Stebler; Erich Schriever		Soviet Union; Ernst Verbin; Juri Sorokin		Yugoslavia; Dragutin Petrovečki; Milan Korošec	
M2-	Soviet Union; Igor Buldakov; Viktor Ivanov		Belgium; Michel Knuysen; Bob Baetens		Denmark; Finn Pedersen; Kjeld Østrøm	
M2+	France; Guy Nosbaum; Claude Martin; Daniel Forget (cox)		West Germany; Helmut Heinhold; Heinz Manchen; Otto Nordmeyer (cox)		Belgium; René Verhoeven; Joseph Van Thillo; Henri de Brie (cox)	
M4-	Denmark; Helge Muxoll Schrøder; Björn Brönnum; Leif Hermansen; Ole Scavenius Jensen		Norway; Carl Monssen; Odd Johanson; Kjell Gundersen; Svein Hansen		Great Britain; Gavin Sorrell; James Green; Colin Porter; Edward Field	
M4+	Czechoslovakia; Karel Mejta; Jiří Havlis; Jan Jindra; Stanislav Lusk; Miroslav Koranda (cox)		Soviet Union; Kirill Putyrsky; Georgiy Bryulgart; Georgy Gushchenko; Boris Fyodorov; Boris Brechko (cox)		Switzerland; Rico Bianchi; Karl Weidmann; Émile Ess; Heini Scheller; Walter Leiser (cox)	
M8+	Soviet Union; Yevgeny Brago; Vladimir Rodimushkin; Slava Amiragov; Igor Borisov; Yevgeny Samsonov; Leonid Gissen; Aleksey Komarov; Vladimir Kryukov; Alexander Majantsev (cox)		Denmark; Flemming Nimb; Kjeld Larsen; Børge Hougaard; Svend Erik Schougaard; Wesley Ernest Pedersen; Walter Schröder; Kurt Andersen Krog; Aage Nielsen Drejer; Finn Hansen Aabye (cox)		France; Pierre Blondiaux; Jean-Jacques Guissart; Marc Bouissou; Roger Gautier; Jean-Paul Pieddeloup; Jean Rivière; Géo Rouhaud; René Lotti; Lionel Biet (cox)	
