= Beljak =

Beljak may refer to:

- Villach, city in Austria, Slovenian name Beljak
- Krešo Beljak (born 1971), Croatian politician
- Boris Beljak (1930–2013), Croatian rower
