= Regala =

Regala may refers to:

- Fetească regală, a white grape variety found in Romania
- Debbie Regala (born 1945), American politician
- John Regala (1967–2023), Filipino actor and environmentalist
- Manuel Regala (born 1931), Portuguese rower
- Williams Régala (died 2018), Haitian politician
