= Ottorino =

Ottorino is an Italian male given name. It may refer to:

- Ottorino Pietro Alberti (1927–2012), Italian Roman Catholic archbishop
- Ottorino Barassi (1898–1971), Italian sports official
- Ottorino Celli (1890–?), Italian cyclist
- Ottorino Enzo (1926–2012), Italian rower
- Ottorino Flaborea (born 1940), Italian former basketball player and coach
- Ottorino Gentiloni (1865–1916), Italian politician
- Ottorino Mezzalama (1888–1931), Italian mountain climber
- Ottorino Piotti (born 1954), Italian former footballer
- Ottorino Quaglierini (1915–1992), Italian rower
- Ottorino Respighi (1879–1936), Italian composer, musicologist and conductor
- Ottorino Sartor (1945–2021), Peruvian football goalkeeper
- Ottorino Volonterio (1917–2003), Swiss racing driver
