= José Pinheiro =

José Pinheiro may refer to:

- José Pinheiro (fencer) (born 1938), Portuguese Olympic fencer
- José Pinheiro (director) (born 1945), French film director
- José Pinheiro (rowing) (born 1933), Portuguese Olympic rower
- José Alberto Pinheiro (born 1980), Portuguese director, screenwriter and producer

== See also ==
- Francisco José Pinheiro (born 1954), Brazilian historian, writer, and politician
