= Lionel Robberds =

Australian rower (1939–2024)

Personal information
- Nationality: Australian
- Born: 2 April 1939 Sydney, Australia
- Died: 31 March 2024 (aged 84) Sydney, Australia

Sport
- Sport: Rowing

Achievements and titles
- Olympic finals: 1960 Rome
- National finals: ULVA Trophy 1951–1958; King's Cup 1955–57, 1959
Medal record
Men's rowing
Representing Australia
British Empire (and Commonwealth) Games
Gold medal – first place	1954 Vancouver	M4+
Silver medal – second place	1958 Cardiff	M8+
Bronze medal – third place	1958 Cardiff	M4+

Lionel Philip Robberds, AM, King's Counsel (2 April 1939 – 31 March 2024) was an Australian representative rowing coxswain, national representative and world champion squash player and barrister. In rowing, he was seven times a national champion who won a gold medal in a coxed four at the 1954 Commonwealth Games; silver and bronze medals at the 1958 Commonwealth Games; and competed at the 1960 Rome Olympics in the men's coxed four. In squash, he was a member of Australia's 1973 World Champion amateur four-man team. As a lawyer, his career at the New South Wales bar extended over fifty years. He was appointed a QC in 1982 and later a senior member of the New South Wales Civil and Administrative Tribunal.

== Club and state rowing ==
Robberds was educated at Sydney Boys High School though he did not cox at school. His club rowing was from Sydney's Leichhardt Rowing Club and from the Sydney University Boat Club.

State selection first came for Robberds a month after he turned twelve in 1951, to cox the New South Wales women's four which contested and won the ULVA Trophy at the Interstate Regatta. For seven consecutive years Robberds coxed the New South Wales women's four and saw victories at the Interstate Regattas of 1952, 1953, 1955, 1956 and 1957. In 1955 he also coxed the New South Wales men's eight in their King's Cup attempt at the Interstate Regatta. In 1956 and 1957 he again steered both the New South Wales women's four and the men's eight. In both years the four were victors and the eight placed second. For the 1958 Interstate Regatta, Robberds was away with the Australian squad at the Commonwealth Games but in 1959 he was back in the stern of the New South Wales men's eight and steered them to a King's Cup victory.

In 1957 aged seventeen and already at university, Robberds coxed the Sydney University eight at the 1957 Australian Universities Championships.

== International representative rowing ==
For the 1954 British Empire and Commonwealth Games in Vancouver as was customary, that year's winning King's Cup eight - Victoria - were invited to represent as the Australian crew. They declined citing concerns on funding and the racing standard and so a squad was selected which comprised three New South Wales scullers in Wood, Evatt and Riley and two sweep oarsmen from the New South Wales eight Geoff Williamson and David Anderson. The squad were able to contest the single and double scull and a pair and coxed four. As the Leichhardt club coxswain of Williamson and Anderson, Robberds aged just fifteen, was selected to cox the four which rowed to a gold medal victory.

Selection racing for the 1958 British Empire and Commonwealth Games was conducted in January 1958 and New South Wales oarsmen and combinations dominated. The New South Wales eight was selected in toto to race as the Australian eight and Robberds selected as coxswain. In Cardiff the eight rowed to a silver medal and four of the crew with Robberds in the stern also raced as a coxed four and took a bronze medal.

For the 1960 Rome Olympics the Australian eight was the winning King's Cup West Australian eight. A coxed four was selected as the fourth priority boat and a New South Wales four was picked with Robberds on the rudder. In Rome they made the Olympic final and finished in fifth place.

== Squash representative ==
Robberds took up squash in 1963. By 1970 he was the fifth ranked player in New South Wales and at that year's Australian Championships he beat Cam Nancarrow, the Australian #2 seed. Along with his brother Greg, Lionel Robberds made the New South Wales men's team and he was a part of their legacy when between 1958 and 1973 members of that team won 78 consecutive matches at Australian carnivals. Nancarrow, Ken Hiscoe, Ted Hamilton and others participated in that time in the four-men squad. The unbeaten run ended with a loss to Queensland in 1974. In 1973 Robberds was selected in the Australian national men's team which competed in and won the World Men's Team Championship governed by the World Squash Federation. The next men's world championships were held in England in 1976 and again Robberds was selected in the Australian team who competed and placed third overall.

There was a broad family connection with the game of squash. Robberds' nephews Brett Martin and Rodney Martin were both world champions though their sister Michelle Martin had the greatest success in the family and she credited Robberds with designing a training programme and providing psychological and tactical support which made the difference to her career. Martin was ranked sixth in the world before Robberds commenced to coach her and she began winning major titles immediately. She spent 44 months from March 1993 to October 1996 as the best women's squash player in the world before Australia's Sarah Fitz-Gerald broke her dominance. Martin returned to the world #1 ranking in 1998 and 1999.

== Legal career ==
Robberds completed a law degree at the University of Sydney in 1962. He was admitted to the New South Wales bar in 1966 and was appointed a Queen's Counsel in 1982. He practised in criminal and commercial law and appeals with specialities in customs prosecutions and commissions of inquiry.

Robberds has appeared as either prosecutor or defence counsel in a number of high-profile trials. He was a prosecuting counsel in the 2005 trial of Rodney Adler regarding the collapse of HIH Insurance; for Moses Obeid in the 2012 Independent Commission Against Corruption; and for the Australian Federal Police in the 2014 inquiry into the 1995 conviction of David Harold Eastman for the murder of AFP Assistant Commissioner Colin Winchester.

He was a member of the National Crime Authority in 1988, a member of the legal profession's Standards Board in 1994 and a member of the Legal Services Tribunal in 1995. He was a part-time senior member of the New South Wales Civil and Administrative Tribunal. In 2016 Robberds was awarded Member of the Order of Australia for significant service to the law.
