= Dave Anderson (rower) =

Australian rower (1932–2025)

David Anderson
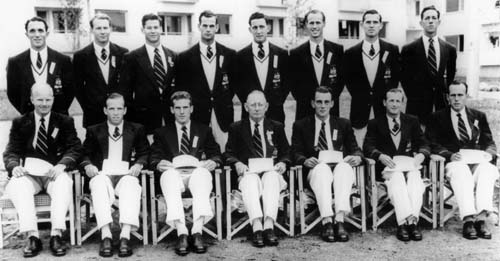
- Anderson (back row 2nd from left) in the 1952 Olympic rowing squad

Personal information
- Born: David Rollo Anderson; 8 April 1932
- Died: 5 November 2025 (aged 93) Wollongong, New South Wales, Australia
- Education: Sydney Boys High School
- Relatives: Wendy Laidlaw (daughter)

Sport
- Sport: Rowing
- Club: Leichhardt Rowing Club
Medal record
Men's rowing
Representing Australia
Olympic Games
| Bronze medal – third place | 1952 Helsinki | Men's eight |
British Empire (and Commonwealth) Games
| Gold medal – first place | 1954 Vancouver | Coxed four |
| Bronze medal – third place | 1954 Vancouver | Coxless pair |

David Rollo Anderson (8 April 1932 – 5 November 2025) was an Australian rower who competed in the 1952 Summer Olympics, the 1954 Commonwealth Games and in the 1956 Summer Olympics.

== Club and state rowing ==
Anderson attended Sydney Boys High School, graduating in 1948. Both Nimrod Greenwood and Edward Pain, who were in the Australian eight at the 1952 Summer Olympics with Anderson, also attended Sydney High.

Anderson did his senior rowing at the Leichhardt Rowing Club in Sydney. The Guerin-Foster Rowing History site quotes the Leichhardt Centennial History of 1986 wherein Anderson is referred to as the most prominent interstate and international Leichhardt rower up until 1986. In eight consecutive seasons from 1950 to 1957 he was selected in the New South Wales state eight which contested the King's Cup at the Australian Rowing Championships. The New South Wales crew were national champions in 1950 and 1951 and were selected in toto as the Olympic representative eight for 1952.

== International representative rowing ==
In 1952, he was in the four seat of the Australian boat which won the bronze medal in the eights event at the Helsinki Olympics. Four years later at 1956 Melbourne he stroked Australia's coxless four which was eliminated in the semi-final stage of that competition.

In the interim, for the 1954 British Empire and Commonwealth Games in Vancouver as was customary, that year's winning King's Cup eight - Victoria - were invited to represent as the Australian crew. They declined citing concerns on funding and the racing standard and so a squad was selected which comprised three New South Wales scullers in Wood, Evatt and Riley and two sweep oarsmen from the New South Wales eight - Geoff Williamson and Anderson. The squad were able to contest the single and double scull, a pair and coxed four. Anderson and Williamson won bronze rowing as the coxless pair and then with the two scullers Wood and Evatt up the bow end, they won gold as a coxed four steered by Anderson's Leichhardt club coxswain Lionel Robberds.

== Personal life and death ==
Anderson was the father of Wendy Laidlaw, who competed in the Australian women's basketball team at the 1984 Olympic Games held in Los Angeles.

Anderson died on 5 November 2025, at the age of 93.
