= Mervyn Finlay =

Australian judge and rower (1925–2014)

Honourable Mervyn Finlay QC
- Mervyn Finlay, 1952 Helsinki Olympics.

Puisne Judge of the Supreme Court of New South Wales
- In office 13 August 1984 – 9 August 1995

Personal details
- Born: Mervyn David Finlay; 17 June 1925
- Died: 2 July 2014 (aged 89)
- Citizenship: Australian
- Education: University of Sydney
- Profession: Barrister; Judge

Olympic medal record

Men's rowing
Bronze medal – third place	1952 Helsinki	Men's eight

Mervyn David Finlay (17 June 1925 – 2 July 2014) was an Australian judge of the Supreme Court of New South Wales and Queen's Counsel. He was a WWII RAAF officer, represented Australia at rowing in the 1952 Summer Olympics and was a NSW state athletics champion.

== Early life and sporting career ==
Born in Balmain, Sydney one of two children to solicitor Mervyn Finlay and his wife Marjorie (née Kirkwood), Finlay was educated at Sydney Grammar School. He was commissioned an RAAF Flying Officer in the closing stages of World War II. In 1948 he was the New South Wales state athletics champion at the 880yds event.

His senior rowing was done with the Leichhardt Rowing Club in Sydney where he was club captain in 1952. In the three seasons from 1950 to 1952 he was selected in the New South Wales state eight which contested the King's Cup at the Australian Rowing Championships. The New South Wales crew were national champions in 1950 and 1951.

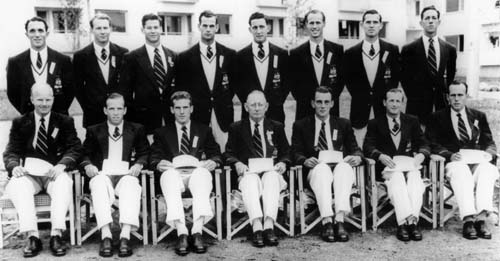
Finlay (back row 3rd from right) in the 1952 Olympic Rowing Squad

For the 1952 Helsinki Olympics an all-New South Wales crew was selected twelve months in advance based on the 1951 King's Cup result. The Olympic selection crew raced the 1952 King's Cup for New South Wales during its preparation and was comprehensively beaten by Victoria. The media then claimed the Victorian crew should be nominated instead. However the selector Joe Gould stuck with the selected crew since a number of them including stroke Phil Cayzer, had severe adverse reactions to the vaccinations they'd taken for overseas travel. It was also mentioned that their fundraising responsibilities, some 7,000 pounds, impacted their preparation - the Australian Olympic Federation had only been able to fund four air tickets for the eight. Finlay was seated at six in that Australian Olympic men's eight who to their credit won the bronze medal in Helsinki.

== Legal career ==
He was admitted to the Bar in 1952 and practised as a Queen's Counsel in New South Wales. From 1984 to 1995 he was a New South Wales Supreme Court judge.

After retirement from the bench he was appointed in June 1997 as Inspector of the Police Integrity Commission for a five-year term. He later conducted a judicial review into the law of manslaughter in NSW and its application to negligence-caused deaths of an unborn children. Certain of his proposed statutory amendments were adopted into law. Following a period as Chairman of the NSW Innocence Panel, Finlay was appointed Assistant Commissioner of the Police Integrity Commission, for a period expiring shortly after his 80th birthday. In 2007 he was recommended and took up a post as Inspector (Assistant Commissioner) of the newly established New South Wales Police Integrity Commission.

== Personal ==
He married Prudence Teece and raised four children at Bellevue Hill in Sydney. Finlay died on 2 July 2014.
