= László Marton =

László Marton may refer to:

- László Marton (director) (1943–2019), theatre director
- László Marton (rower) (1923–1989), Hungarian Olympic rower
- László Marton (sculptor) (1925–2008), Hungarian sculptor
