= Tom Chessell =

Australian rower

- Born: 1 April 1914; Ashfield, New South Wales
- Died: 9 May 1992 (aged 78); Chevron Island, Queensland
- Education: Newington College; Sydney Technical College
- Occupation: Building Inspector
- Spouse: Betty
- Children: 2 sons

Olympic medal record

Men's rowing

Representing Australia
Bronze medal – third place	1952 Helsinki	Men's eight

Thomas Edmund Malcolm Chessell (1 April 1914 – 9 May 1992) was an Australian representative rowing coxswain and an active serviceman of WWII. As a coxswain he was an Olympian - coxing the Australian men's eight at the 1952 Helsinki Olympics and was a three-time Australian national champion.

== Birth and education ==
Tom Chessell was born in Ashfield, New South Wales, and attended Newington College (1929–1931) where he started rowing. As a cox he represented Newington at the Head of the River in the 2nd IV in 1930 and the 1st VIII in the following year.

== Building career ==
Forced by the Great Depression to leave school, Chessell worked for his family's building company and studied building at Sydney Technical College. He worked in the building industry all his life and was Chief Building Inspector for Ku-ring-gai Council on his retirement in 1975.

== War service ==
At the outbreak of World War II, Chessell joined the RAAF as a carpenter/rigger serving in the Middle East for two and a half years and was mentioned in dispatches. He returned to Australia to complete officer training and attained the rank of pilot officer. In 1945, shortly before war's end, he married.

== Rowing career ==
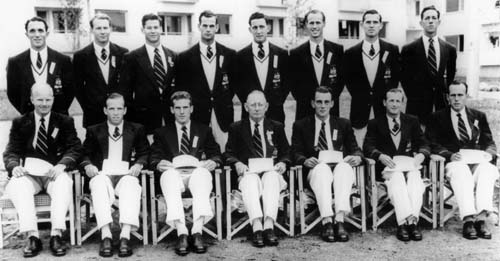
Chessell (seated 2nd from right) in the 1952 Olympic Rowing Squad

After leaving school, Chessell joined Sydney Rowing Club.

Chessell's first state selection for New South Wales came at aged 36 in 1950 in the men's senior eight contesting the King's Cup at the annual Australian Interstate Regatta. Chessell steered the 1950 New South Wales eight which won the King's Cup. He coxed further New South Wales King's Cup eights in 1951 (gold) and 1952 (silver)

For the 1952 Helsinki Olympics an all New South Wales crew was selected twelve months in advance based on the 1951 King's Cup result. The Olympic selection crew raced the 1952 King's Cup for New South Wales during its preparation and was comprehensively beaten by Victoria. The media then claimed the Victorian crew should be nominated instead. However the selector Joe Gould stuck with the selected crew since a number of them including stroke Phil Cayzer, had severe adverse reactions to the vaccinations they'd taken for overseas travel. It was also mentioned that their fundraising responsibilities, some 7,000 pounds, impacted their preparation – the Australian Olympic Federation had only been able to fund four air tickets for the eight. Chessell was the coxswain of that Australian Olympic men's eight who to their credit won the bronze medal in Helsinki.

== Death ==
Having retired to Surfers Paradise, Chessell died on Chevron Island, survived by his wife and two sons, Ian and Bruce. He was cremated and his ashes were spread on the Parramatta River by the 1952 Olympic eight with Ian Chessell as cox.
