= Birger Andersson =

Birger Andersson may refer to:

- Birger Andersson (tennis) (born 1951), Swedish tennis player
- Birger Andersson (rower) (1925–2004), Finnish rower
