= Vilhelmsen =

Vilhelmsen is a surname. Notable people with the surname include:

- Annette Vilhelmsen (born 1959), Danish politician
- Jens Vilhelmsen (born 1985), Danish rower
- John Vilhelmsen (born 1934), Danish coxswain
