= Niga =

Niga or NIGA may refer to:

- Toma Niga (born 1997), Romanian professional footballer
- Ion Niga (1925–2011), Romanian rower

== See also ==
- Nigga
- Niger (disambiguation)
