= Igor Polyakov =

Olympic medal record

Men's rowing

Representing the Soviet Union
Silver medal – second place	1952 Helsinki	Eight

Igor Nikolayevich Polyakov (Russian: Игорь Николаевич Поляков, 15 July 1912 – 16 May 2008) was a rower who competed in the 1952 Summer Olympics for the Soviet Union and was the coxswain of the Soviet team that won the silver medal in the eights event. He was also a six-time Soviet champion. After finishing his sporting career, he became a rowing coach and won several awards and received several awards and recognition for his contributions as a coach. He died in Moscow in 2008.
