= Zacarias Andias =

Portuguese rower (1931–2025)

Personal information
- Nationality: Portuguese
- Born: 30 September 1931
- Died: 12 February 2025 (aged 93)

Sport
- Sport: Rowing

Zacarias Andias (30 September 1931 – 12 February 2025) was a Portuguese rower. He competed in the men's eight event at the 1952 Summer Olympics. Rower died on 12 February 2025, at the age of 93.
