= John Sharp (rower) =

Canadian rower

Personal information
- Born: 27 May 1931; Toronto, Ontario, Canada
- Died: 22 July 1981 (aged 50); Toronto, Ontario, Canada

Sport
- Sport: Rowing

John Arthur Sharp (27 May 1931 – 22 July 1981) was a Canadian rower. He competed in the men's eight event at the 1952 Summer Olympics.
