= Charles Manring =

American rower

Personal information
- Full name: Charles David Manring
- Born: August 18, 1929 Cleveland, Ohio, U.S.
- Died: August 7, 1991 (aged 61)
Medal record
Men's rowing
Representing the United States
Olympic Games
Gold medal – first place	1952 Helsinki	Men's eight

Charles David "Charley" Manring (August 18, 1929 – August 7, 1991) was an American competition rower and Olympic champion, and later naval officer. Born in Cleveland, Ohio, he won a gold medal in coxed eights at the 1952 Summer Olympics, as coxswain for the American team.
