= Toivo Räsänen =

Finnish rower

Personal information
- Nationality: Finnish
- Born: 8 June 1925 Kurkijoki, Finland
- Died: 15 October 2002 (aged 77)

Sport
- Sport: Rowing

Toivo Räsänen (8 June 1925 – 15 October 2002) was a Finnish rower. He competed in the men's eight event at the 1952 Summer Olympics.
