= Antti Arell =

Finnish rower

Personal information
- Nationality: Finnish
- Born: 18 May 1927; Lapua, Finland
- Died: 9 January 2013 (aged 85); Turku, Finland

Sport
- Sport: Rowing

Antti Arell (18 May 1927 – 9 January 2013) was a Finnish rower. He competed in the men's eight event at the 1952 Summer Olympics.
