= George McCauley =

Canadian rower (1929–2025)

Personal information
- Nationality: Canadian
- Born: 29 October 1929 Toronto, Canada
- Died: 29 September 2025 (aged 95) Toronto, Canada

Sport
- Sport: Rowing

George McCauley (29 October 1929 - 29 September 2025) was a Canadian rower. He competed in the men's eight event at the 1952 Summer Olympics. He died on 29 September 2025, at the age of 95.
