= Vladimir Rodimushkin =

Soviet rower

Personal information
- Born: Vladimir Aleksandrovich Rodimushkin; 22 December 1921 Moscow, Russian SFSR
- Died: 15 January 1986 (aged 64)

Sport
- Sport: Rowing
Medal record
Men's rowing
Representing the Soviet Union
Olympic Games
Silver medal – second place	1952 Helsinki	Eight
European Rowing Championships
Gold medal – first place	1953 Copenhagen	Eight
Gold medal – first place	1954 Amsterdam	Eight
Gold medal – first place	1955 Ghent	Eight

Vladimir Aleksandrovich Rodimushkin (Russian: Владимир Александрович Родимушкин, 22 December 1921 – 15 January 1986) was a Russian rower who competed for the Soviet Union in the 1952 Summer Olympics.

He was born in Moscow in 1921. In 1952 he won the silver medal as crew member of the Soviet boat in the eight event.
