= Toni Siebenhaar =

German rower

Personal information
- Nationality: German
- Born: 27 August 1923; Schweinfurt, Germany
- Died: 28 January 2000 (aged 76)

Sport
- Sport: Rowing

Toni Siebenhaar (27 August 1923 – 28 January 2000) was a German rower. He competed in the men's eight event at the 1952 Summer Olympics.
