= Klaus Lampi =

Finnish rower

Personal information
- Nationality: Finnish
- Born: 24 January 1929; Turku, Finland
- Died: 23 April 2004 (aged 75); Turku, Finland

Sport
- Sport: Rowing

Klaus Lampi (24 January 1929 – 23 April 2004) was a Finnish rower. He competed in the men's eight event at the 1952 Summer Olympics.
