= Yevgeniy Brago =

Russian rower (1929–2024)

Personal information
- Born: Yevgeniy Nikolaevich Brago; 1 March 1929 Moscow, Russian SFSR, USSR
- Died: 13 May 2024 (aged 95)

Sport
- Sport: Rowing
Medal record
Men's rowing
Representing the Soviet Union
Olympic Games
Silver medal – second place	1952 Helsinki	Eight
European Rowing Championships
Gold medal – first place	1953 Copenhagen	Eight
Gold medal – first place	1954 Amsterdam	Eight
Gold medal – first place	1955 Ghent	Eight

Yevgeniy Nikolaevich Brago (Russian: Евгений Николаевич Браго; 1 March 1929 – 13 May 2024) was a Russian rower who competed for the Soviet Union in the 1952 Summer Olympics. He was born in Moscow on 1 March 1929. In 1952 he won the silver medal as crew member of the Soviet boat in the eights event.

In 1953 he received higher education at the Moscow Energy Institute. In 1958 he graduated from graduate school at the Energy Institute of the USSR Academy of Sciences with the degree of Candidate of Technical Sciences. In 1979 he defended his doctoral dissertation.

Member of the International Academy of Informatization (since 1996). He taught at the University of Siegen and Gubkin Russian State University of Oil and Gas.

Brago died on 13 May 2024, at the age of 95.
