= Montanino Nuvoli =

Italian rower

Personal information
- Nationality: Italian
- Born: 2 January 1931
- Died: 4 October 1997 (aged 66)

Sport
- Sport: Rowing

Montanino Nuvoli (2 January 1931 – 4 October 1997) was an Italian rower. He competed in the men's eight event at the 1952 Summer Olympics.
