= James Dunbar (rower) =

American rower (1930–2018)

Personal information
- Full name: James Ralph Dunbar
- Born: July 17, 1930 Crawfordsville, Indiana, U.S.
- Died: May 14, 2018 (aged 87) The Woodlands, Texas
- Resting place: USNA, Annapolis, Maryland
Medal record
Men's rowing
Representing the United States
Olympic Games
Gold medal – first place	1952 Helsinki	Eight

James Ralph "Jim" Dunbar (July 17, 1930 – May 14, 2018) was an American competition rower and Olympic champion. He was born in Crawfordsville, Indiana. At the 1952 Summer Olympics in Helsinki, Finland, he and his teammates, all members of the U.S. Naval Academy's Crew Team, captured the gold medal in the men's eight rowing competition for the U.S.

Following his Olympic win, Dunbar graduated from the United States Naval Academy and joined the U.S. Air Force where he spent his career as a fighter pilot, retiring as a full colonel in 1982. He flew an F-105 Thunderchief in combat in the Vietnam War, and received the Distinguished Flying Cross. He has stayed connected to the sport of rowing by coaching high school rowing teams, including the J.E.B. Stuart High School Crew Team in Fairfax County, Virginia. He has also raised money for local rowing teams and was involved in choosing the site for rowing competition in the 1996 Olympic Games in Atlanta.
