= João Cravo =

Portuguese rower (1929–2022)

Personal information
- Nationality: Portuguese
- Born: 16 September 1929
- Died: June 2022 (aged 92)

Sport
- Sport: Rowing

João Cravo (16 September 1929 – June 2022) was a Portuguese rower. He competed in the men's eight event at the 1952 Summer Olympics.
