= Alexandru Rotaru =

Romanian rower

Personal information
- Nationality: Romanian
- Born: 28 February 1929

Sport
- Sport: Rowing

Alexandru Rotaru (born 28 February 1929) is a Romanian rower. He competed in the men's eight event at the 1952 Summer Olympics.
