= Milivoi Iancovici =

Romanian rower (born 1932)

Personal information
- Nationality: Romanian
- Born: 1 April 1934 (age 90)

Sport
- Sport: Rowing

Milivoi Iancovici (born 1 April 1934) is a Romanian rower. He competed in the men's eight event at the 1952 Summer Olympics.
