= Ferdinando Smerghetto =

Italian rower

Personal information
- Nationality: Italian
- Born: 26 November 1927

Sport
- Sport: Rowing

Ferdinando Smerghetto (26 November 1927 – 18 December 1993) was an Italian rower. He competed in the men's eight event at the 1952 Summer Olympics.
