= João da Paula =

Portuguese rower (1930–2021)

Personal information
- Nationality: Portuguese
- Born: 20 June 1930
- Died: 28 October 2021 (aged 91); Aveiro, Portugal

Sport
- Sport: Rowing

João da Paula (20 June 1930 – 28 October 2021) was a Portuguese rower. He competed in the men's eight event at the 1952 Summer Olympics. Da Paula died in Aveiro on 28 October 2021, at the age of 91.
