= Alastair MacLeod =

British rower

Personal information
- Nationality: British
- Born: 2 November 1924
- Died: 26 April 2002 (aged 77)

Sport
- Sport: Rowing

Alastair MacLeod (2 November 1924 – 26 April 2002) was a British rower. He competed in the men's eight event at the 1952 Summer Olympics.
