= Jan op den Velde =

Dutch rower (1931–2022)

Personal information
- Born: 11 July 1931 Zaandam, the Netherlands
- Died: 3 February 2022 (aged 90) Hilversum, the Netherlands

Sport
- Sport: Rowing
- Club: D.S.R.V. Laga
Medal record
Men's rowing
Representing the Netherlands
European Rowing Championships
Bronze medal – third place	1951 Mâcon	Eight

Jan op den Velde (11 July 1931 – 3 February 2022) was a Dutch rower. Op den Velde was born in 1931 in Zaandam, the Netherlands. He was a member of the student rowing club D.S.R.V. Laga. He competed at the 1952 Summer Olympics in Helsinki with the men's coxless four where they were eliminated in the round one repêchage. He died on 3 February 2022 at the age of 90.
