= Edward Stevens (rower) =

American rower (1932–2013)

Medal record

Men's rowing

Representing the United States

Olympic Games
Gold medal – first place	1952 Helsinki	Eight

Edward Stevens (September 15, 1932 – June 9, 2013) was an American rower and Olympic champion. Stevens won a gold medal in the men's eight at the 1952 Summer Olympics, as stroke of the US Naval Academy team, which rowed for the United States Olympic team in 1952.
