= Vladimir Kryukov (rower) =

Russian rower and aerospace engineer (1925–2005)

Personal information
- Born: Vladimir Nikolayevich Kryukov; 2 October 1925 Moscow, Russian SFSR
- Died: 26 June 2005 (aged 79)

Sport
- Sport: Rowing
- Club: Wings of the Soviets (Moscow)
Medal record
Men's rowing
Representing the Soviet Union
Olympic Games
Silver medal – second place	1952 Helsinki	Eight
European Rowing Championships
Gold medal – first place	1953 Copenhagen	Eight
Gold medal – first place	1954 Amsterdam	Eight
Gold medal – first place	1955 Ghent	Eight

Vladimir Nikolayevich Kryukov (Note: Sometimes spelled as Krukov) (Russian: Владимир Николаевич Крюков; 2 October 1925 – 26 June 2005) was a Russian rower and aerospace engineer who competed for the Soviet Union in the 1952 and 1956 Summer Olympics.

At the 1952 Summer Olympics, Kryukov won the silver medal as a crew member of the Soviet boat in the men's eight competition.

== Biography ==
Kryukov was born on 2 October 1925 in Moscow. In 1949, he graduated from the Moscow Aviation Institute with a Doctor of Technical Sciences degree. Kryukov would go on to become a senior researcher at the institute's Department of Aerospace Thermal Engineering.

As a rower, he played for the Wings of the Soviets in Moscow and participated in several notable events, such as the Henley Royal Regatta and the European Rowing Championships; in the latter, he won three gold medals, in 1953, 1954, and 1955. After being awarded a silver medal at the 1952 Summer Olympics in the men's eight competition, Kryukov was again part of the Soviet boat at the 1956 Summer Olympics; however, they were eliminated in the semi-finals.

In 1953, Kryukov became an Honored Master of Sports of the USSR, and in 1957, he was awarded the Medal "For Labour Valour".

Kryukov died on 26 June 2005.
