= Jack Russell (rower) =

Canadian rower

Personal information
- Nationality: Canadian
- Born: 7 April 1930 (age 94)

Sport
- Sport: Rowing

Angus John Russell (born 7 April 1930) is a Canadian rower. He competed in the men's eight event at the 1952 Summer Olympics.
