= Björn Brönnum =

Danish rower (1929–2018)

Personal information
- Born: 16 September 1929 Frederiksberg, Denmark
- Died: 20 August 2018 (aged 88)

Sport
- Sport: Rowing
Medal record
Men's rowing
Representing Denmark
European Rowing Championships
Silver medal – second place	1951 Mâcon	Eight
Gold medal – first place	1953 Copenhagen	Coxless four
Silver medal – second place	1955 Ghent	Coxless four

Björn Brönnum (16 September 1929 – 20 August 2018) was a Danish rower. He competed at the 1952 Summer Olympics in Helsinki with the men's eight where they were eliminated in the semi-finals repêchage. Brönnum died on 20 August 2018, at the age of 88.

== Sources ==
- Bjørn Brønnum at Olympics.com
- Bjørn Brønnum at Olympedia
- Bjørn Brønnum at InterSportStats
