= Richard Murphy (rower) =

American rower (1931–2023)

Personal information
- Born: 14 November 1931 New Jersey, U.S.
- Died: 8 August 2023 (aged 91)
Medal record
Men's rowing
Representing the United States
Olympic Games
Gold medal – first place	1952 Helsinki	Eight

Richard Frederick Murphy (November 14, 1931 – August 8, 2023) was an American competition rower and Olympic champion.

== Biography ==
Richard Frederick Murphy was born in New Jersey on November 14, 1931. Murphy won a gold medal in coxed eights at the 1952 Summer Olympics, as a member of the American team. He died on August 8, 2023, at the age of 91.
