= Henry Proctor (rower) =

American rower

Medal record

Men's rowing

Representing the United States

Olympic Games
Gold medal – first place	1952 Helsinki	Eight

Henry Proctor (19 October 1929 – 13 April 2005) was an American competition rower and Olympic champion. He was later a military officer and retired as colonel in 1971. Proctor won a gold medal in the men's eight at the 1952 Summer Olympics, as a member of the American team.
