= Ștefan Somogy =

Romanian rower

Personal information
- Nationality: Romanian
- Born: 17 September 1929; Arad, Romania

Sport
- Sport: Rowing

Ștefan Somogy (born 17 September 1929) is a Romanian rower. He competed in the men's eight event at the 1952 Summer Olympics.
