= Leonid Gissen =

Soviet rower

Personal information
- Born: Leonid Davidovich Gissen; 28 June 1931 Moscow, Russian SFSR, Soviet Union
- Died: 7 February 2005 (aged 73) Moscow, Russia

Sport
- Sport: Rowing
Medal record
Men's rowing
Representing the Soviet Union
Olympic Games
Silver medal – second place	1952 Helsinki	Eight
European Rowing Championships
Gold medal – first place	1953 Copenhagen	Eight
Gold medal – first place	1954 Amsterdam	Eight
Gold medal – first place	1955 Ghent	Eight

Leonid Davidovich Gissen (Russian: Леонид Давыдович Гиссен, 28 June 1931 – 7 February 2005) was a Russian rower who competed for the Soviet Union in the 1952 Summer Olympics and in the 1956 Summer Olympics.

In 1952, he won the silver medal as crew member of the Soviet boat in the eights event.

Four years later, he was part of the Soviet boat which was eliminated in the semi-final of the eight competition.
