= Alberto Bozzato =

Italian rower (1930–2022)

Personal information
- Nationality: Italian
- Born: 8 April 1930 Venice, Italy
- Died: 18 June 2022 (aged 92) Rome, Italy

Sport
- Sport: Rowing

Alberto Bozzato (8 April 1930 – 18 June 2022) was an Italian rower. He competed in the men's eight event at the 1952 Summer Olympics.
