= Ștefan Pongratz =

Romanian rower

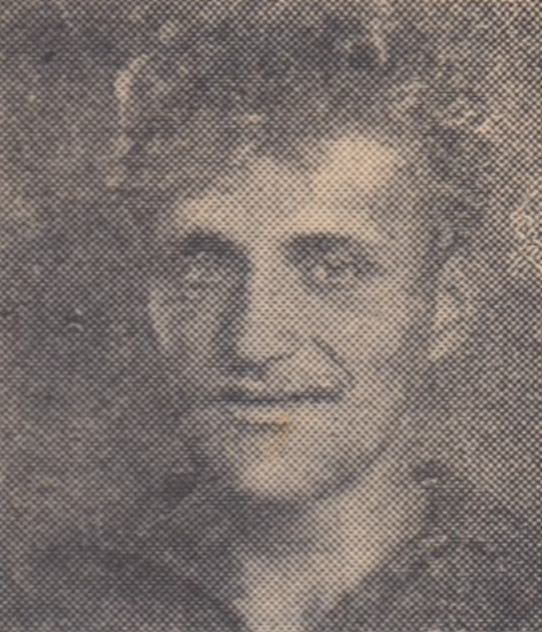

Personal information
- Born: 17 August 1930 Arad, Romania
- Height: 178 cm (5 ft 10 in)
- Weight: 83 kg (183 lb)

Sport
- Sport: Rowing
Medal record
Men's rowing
Representing Romania
European Rowing Championships
Gold medal – first place	1955 Ghent	Coxless four
Bronze medal – third place	1957 Duisburg	Coxless four

Ștefan Pongratz (born 17 August 1930) is a Romanian rower. He competed at the 1952 Summer Olympics in Helsinki with the men's eight where they were eliminated in the round one repêchage.
