= István Sándor (rower) =

Hungarian rower (1921–2018)

Personal information
- Nationality: Hungarian
- Born: 8 June 1921 Budapest, Hungary
- Died: 5 January 2018 (aged 96) Toronto, Canada

Sport
- Sport: Rowing

István Sándor (8 June 1921 – 5 January 2018) was a Hungarian rower. He competed in the men's eight event at the 1952 Summer Olympics.

Sándor had been picked to represent Hungary at the 1948 Olympics, but was dropped for suspected anti-Communist activities. He later emigrated to the United States and then Canada, where he died.
