= Harry Wikman =

Finnish rower

Personal information
- Nationality: Finnish
- Born: 1 September 1929; Turku, Finland
- Died: 4 October 2017 (aged 88); Örebro, Sweden

Sport
- Sport: Rowing

Harry Wikman (1 September 1929 – 4 October 2017) was a Finnish rower. He competed in the men's eight event at the 1952 Summer Olympics.
