= Thore Börjesson =

Swedish rower

Personal information
- Nationality: Swedish
- Born: 1 November 1924; Strömstad, Sweden
- Died: 28 May 2004 (aged 79); Strömstad, Sweden

Sport
- Sport: Rowing

Thore Börjesson (1 November 1924 – 28 May 2004) was a Swedish rower. He competed in the men's eight event at the 1952 Summer Olympics.
