= Hermann Zander =

German rower (1912–1973)

Personal information
- Nationality: German
- Born: 10 November 1912 Bochum, Germany
- Died: 24 February 1973 (aged 60)

Sport
- Sport: Rowing

Hermann Zander (10 November 1912 – 24 February 1973) was a German rower. He competed in the men's eight event at the 1952 Summer Olympics.
