= Helge Muxoll Schrøder =

Danish rower (1924–2012)

Personal information
- Born: 27 November 1924 Horsens, Denmark
- Died: 2 March 2012 (aged 87) Jonstorp, Sweden

Sport
- Sport: Rowing
Medal record
Men's rowing
Representing Denmark
Olympic Games
Silver medal – second place	1948 London	Coxless four
European Rowing Championships
Silver medal – second place	1950 Milan	Eight
Silver medal – second place	1951 Mâcon	Eight
Gold medal – first place	1953 Copenhagen	Coxless four

Helge Muxoll Schrøder (27 November 1924 – 2 March 2012) was a Danish rower who competed in the 1948 Summer Olympics and in the 1952 Summer Olympics. He was born in Horsens. In 1948, he was a crew member of the Danish boat which won the silver medal in the coxless fours event. Four years later, he was eliminated with the Danish boat in the semi-final repechage of the eight competition. He died in 2012 in Jonstorp, Sweden.
