= Leif Hermansen =

Danish rower (1925–2005)

Personal information
- Born: Erik Leif Haugelund Hermansen; 2 November 1925 Frederiksværk, Denmark
- Died: 27 December 2005 (aged 80)

Sport
- Sport: Rowing
Medal record
Men's rowing
Representing Denmark
European Rowing Championships
Silver medal – second place	1949 Amsterdam	Coxed pair
Silver medal – second place	1951 Mâcon	Eight
Gold medal – first place	1953 Copenhagen	Coxless four
Silver medal – second place	1955 Ghent	Coxless four

Erik Leif Haugelund Hermansen (2 November 1925 – 27 December 2005) was a Danish rower. He competed at the 1952 Summer Olympics in Helsinki with the men's eight where they were eliminated in the semi-finals repêchage.
