= John Hinde (rowing) =

British rowing cox

Personal information
- Born: 3 October 1928 Camberwell, Great Britain
- Died: 31 May 2017 (aged 88)

Sport
- Sport: Rowing
Medal record
Men's rowing
Representing Great Britain
European Rowing Championships
Gold medal – first place	1951 Mâcon	Eight

John Frederick Keeling Hinde (3 October 1928 – 31 May 2017) was a British coxswain. He competed at the 1952 Summer Olympics in Helsinki with the men's eight where they came fourth, and in the 1956 Summer Olympics in Melbourne, again in the men's eight.
