= Roger Sharpley (rower) =

British rower

Personal information
- Nationality: British
- Born: 17 May 1929; Shipston-on-Stour, England
- Died: February 1999 (aged 69–70); Oxford, England

Sport
- Sport: Rowing

Roger Sharpley (17 May 1929 – February 1999) was a British rower. He competed in the men's eight event at the 1952 Summer Olympics.
