= Rezső Riheczky =

Hungarian rower

Personal information
- Born: 1933 Budapest, Hungary
- Died: 31 March 1993 (aged 59–60) Budapest, Hungary

Sport
- Sport: Rowing
Medal record
Men's rowing
Representing Hungary
European Rowing Championships
Silver medal – second place	1956 Bled	Coxless four

Rezső Riheczky (1933 – 31 March 1993) was a Hungarian rower. Riheczky was born in 1933 in Budapest. His father, János Riheczky, represented Hungary at the 1936 Olympics in wrestling.

Riheczky Jr. competed at the 1952 Summer Olympics in Helsinki with the men's eight where they were eliminated in the semi-finals repêchage.
