= Gheorghe Măcinic =

Romanian rower (1926–2010)

Personal information
- Nationality: Romanian
- Born: 2 July 1926 Arad, Kingdom of Romania
- Died: January 2010 (aged 83) Arad, Romania

Sport
- Sport: Rowing

Gheorghe Măcinic (2 July 1926 – January 2010) was a Romanian rower. He competed in the men's eight event at the 1952 Summer Olympics. Măcinic died in Arad in January 2010, at the age of 83.
