= Ion Vlăduț =

Romanian rower

Personal information
- Nationality: Romanian
- Born: 3 March 1930

Sport
- Sport: Rowing

Ion Vlăduț (born 3 March 1930) is a Romanian rower, who competed in the men's eight event at the 1952 Summer Olympics.
