= Aleksey Komarov =

Soviet rower

Personal information
- Full name: Aleksey Filippovich Komarov
- Born: 10 December 1921
- Died: 10 May 2013 (aged 91)

Sport
- Sport: Rowing
Medal record
Men's rowing
Representing the Soviet Union
Olympic Games
| Silver medal – second place | 1952 Helsinki | Eight |
European Championships
| Gold medal – first place | 1953 Copenhagen | Eight |
| Gold medal – first place | 1954 Amsterdam | Eight |
| Gold medal – first place | 1955 Ghent | Eight |

Aleksey Filippovich Komarov (Russian: Алексей Филиппович Комаров; 10 December 1921 – 10 May 2013) was a Russian rower who competed for the Soviet Union in the 1952 Summer Olympics.

In 1952 he won the silver medal as crew member of the Soviet boat in the eight event.
