= Robert Detweiler =

American rower (1930–2003)

Medal record

Men's rowing

Representing the United States

Olympic Games
Gold medal – first place	1952 Helsinki	Men's eight

Robert Detweiler (20 July 1930 – 8 December 2003) was an American competition rower and Olympic champion, naval officer, and scientist of solid state physics. He won a gold medal in the men's eight at the 1952 Summer Olympics, as a member of the American team.

After the Olympics, Detweiler became a member of the Church of Jesus Christ of Latter-day Saints.
