= William Fields (rower) =

American rower and naval officer

Medal record

Men's rowing

Representing the United States

Olympic Games
Gold medal – first place	1952 Helsinki	Eight

William Beauford Fields (6 August 1929 – 20 November 1992) was an American competition rower and Olympic champion, and later naval officer. He was born in Forsyth, Georgia.

Fields won a gold medal in the men's eight at the 1952 Summer Olympics, as a member of the American team.
