= Wayne Frye =

American rower (1930–2014)

Medal record

Men's rowing

Representing the United States

Olympic Games
Gold medal – first place	1952 Helsinki	Men's eight

Wayne Frye (November 30, 1930 – February 26, 2014) from Manchester, Ohio was an American competition rower and Olympic champion. He won a gold medal in the men's eight at the 1952 Summer Olympics, as a member of the American team.

He graduated from the United States Naval Academy in 1954 and became a military officer (US Air Force). He participated in combat in the Vietnam War where he commanded the 555th squadron known as the Triple Nickel, flew 266 combat missions and received the Purple Heart. In October 2012, Frye was inducted in the Kentucky Aviation Hall of Fame. He died in February 2014.
