= Bjørn Stybert =

Danish rower

Personal information
- Nationality: Danish
- Born: 16 January 1927; Gentofte, Denmark
- Died: 26 August 2009 (aged 82)

Sport
- Sport: Rowing

Bjørn Stybert (16 January 1927 – 26 August 2009) was a Danish rower. He competed in the men's eight event at the 1952 Summer Olympics.
