= Mervin Kaye =

Canadian rower (1929–2025)

Personal information
- Born: 18 June 1929 Muskoka, Ontario, Canada
- Died: 6 September 2024 (aged 95) Ontario, Canada

Sport
- Sport: Rowing

Mervin Kaye (18 June 1929 – 6 September 2024) was a Canadian rower. He competed in the men's eight event at the 1952 Summer Olympics. Kaye died on 6 September 2024, at the age of 95.
