= Frank Olsson =

Swedish rower

Personal information
- Nationality: Swedish
- Born: 3 November 1922; Strömstad, Sweden
- Died: 26 April 2010 (aged 87); Strömstad, Sweden

Sport
- Sport: Rowing

Frank Olsson (3 November 1922 – 26 April 2010) was a Swedish rower. He competed in the men's eight event at the 1952 Summer Olympics.
