= Edward Worlidge =

British rower (1928–2020)

Personal information
- Full name: Edward John Worlidge
- Nationality: British
- Born: 31 May 1928; West Ham, England
- Died: 30 October 2020 (aged 92)

Sport
- Sport: Rowing

Edward John Worlidge (31 May 1928 – 30 October 2020) was a British rower. He competed in the men's eight event at the 1952 Summer Olympics. Worlidge died on 30 October 2020, at the age of 92.
