= Ivan Simonsson =

Swedish rower

Personal information
- Nationality: Swedish
- Born: 26 January 1924; Strömstad, Sweden
- Died: 30 March 2002 (aged 78); Strömstad, Sweden

Sport
- Sport: Rowing

Ivan Simonsson (26 January 1924 – 30 March 2002) was a Swedish rower. He competed in the men's eight event at the 1952 Summer Olympics.
