= Frank Shakespeare (rower) =

American rower

Personal information
- Full name: Franklin Bradford Shakespeare
- Born: May 31, 1930 (age 96) Philadelphia, Pennsylvania, U.S.
Medal record
Men's rowing
Representing the United States
Olympic Games
| Gold medal – first place | 1952 Helsinki | Eight |

Franklin Bradford Shakespeare (born May 31, 1930) is an American former competition rower, Olympic champion and naval officer.

== Biography ==
Born in Philadelphia, Pennsylvania, on May 31, 1930, Shakespeare won a gold medal in coxed eights at the 1952 Summer Olympics with the American team.

In 1982, he was inducted into the Delaware Sports Hall of Fame.

In 1996, Shakespeare ran the Olympic Torch in the relay for the 1996 Summer Olympics in Atlanta, Georgia as the only Delawarean Olympic medal winner at the time.
