= Norm Rowe =

Canadian rower

Personal information
- Nationality: Canadian
- Born: 6 March 1926
- Died: 6 April 2016 (aged 90); Bracebridge, Ontario, Canada

Sport
- Sport: Rowing

Norman Robert Rowe (6 March 1926 – 6 April 2016) was a Canadian rower. He competed in the men's eight event at the 1952 Summer Olympics.
