= Nimrod Greenwood =

Australian rower (1929–2016)

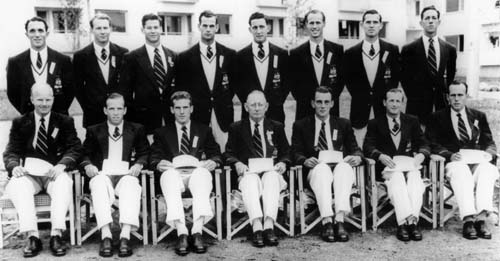
- Greenwood (back row 4th from left) in the 1952 Olympic Rowing Squad

Personal information
- Born: 28 October 1929 New South Wales, Australia
- Died: 9 September 2016 (aged 86) Terrey Hills, New South Wales, Australia

Sport
- Country: Australia
Medal record
Men's rowing
Bronze medal – third place	1952 Helsinki	Men's eight

Nimrod Greenwood (28 October 1929 – 9 September 2016) was an Australian rower who competed in the 1952 Summer Olympics.

He was born in New South Wales, Australia, on 28 October 1929. He graduated from Sydney Boys High School 1946. His senior rowing was done at the Leichhardt Rowing Club in Sydney.

In 1952 he rowed in the three seat of the Australian boat which won the bronze medal in the eights event at the Helsinki Olympics. Edward Pain and David Anderson who were also seated in that VIII had also attended Sydney High.

He participated in the King's Cup as part of the New South Wales crew between 1950 and 1955 winning in 1950 and 1951.

He was awarded with a McVilly-Pearce Pin in 2016. He died in on 9 September 2016 in Terrey Hills, New South Wales.
