= Albino Baldan =

Italian rower

Personal information
- Nationality: Italian
- Born: 4 February 1925; Burano, Italy
- Died: 25 February 1991 (aged 66); Treporti, Italy

Sport
- Sport: Rowing

Albino Baldan (4 February 1925 – 25 February 1991) was an Italian rower. He competed in the men's eight event at the 1952 Summer Olympics.
