= Csaba Kovács (rower) =

Hungarian rower (1932–2002)

Personal information
- Born: 8 December 1932 Budapest, Hungary
- Died: 27 January 2002 (aged 69) Budapest, Hungary
- Height: 186 cm (6 ft 1 in)
- Weight: 90 kg (198 lb)

Sport
- Sport: Rowing
Medal record
Men's rowing
Representing Hungary
European Rowing Championships
Silver medal – second place	1956 Bled	Coxless four

Csaba Kovács (8 December 1932 – 27 January 2002) was a Hungarian rower. He competed at the 1952 Summer Olympics in Helsinki with the men's eight where they were eliminated in the semi-finals repêchage. He died on 27 January 2002 in Budapest.
