= Edward Pain =

Australian rower (1925–2000)

Medal record

Men's rowing

Representing Australia

Olympic Games
Bronze medal – third place	1952 Helsinki	Men's eight

British Empire Games
Gold medal – first place	1950 Auckland	Eights

Edward Oscar Guthrie "Ted" Pain (15 July 1925 – 6 January 2000) was an Australian rower who competed in the 1952 Summer Olympics.

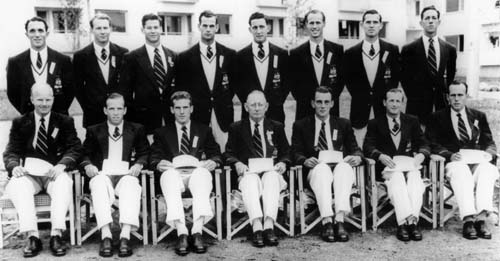
Pain (back row 4th from right) in the 1952 Olympic Rowing Squad

Pain attended Sydney Boys High School from 1938 to 1943, graduating three years ahead of Nimrod Greenwood and five years ahead of David Anderson, who both rowed alongside Pain in the Australian eight at 1952 Summer Olympics.

Pain's senior rowing was done from the University of Sydney club. At the 1950 Empire Games he won the gold medal as part of the Australian boat in the eights competition. In 1952 he was in the seven seat of the Australian boat which won the bronze medal in the eights event at Helsinki. He died in Greenwich, New South Wales.
