= Pál Bakos =

Hungarian rower (1932–2004)

Personal information
- Born: 9 March 1932 Lučenec, Czechoslovakia
- Died: 12 December 2004 (aged 72) Erina, New South Wales, Australia

Sport
- Sport: Rowing
Medal record
Men's rowing
Representing Hungary
European Championships
Bronze medal – third place	1956 Bled	Eight

Pál Bakos (9 March 1932 – 12 December 2004) was a Hungarian rower. He competed at the 1952 Summer Olympics in Helsinki with the men's eight where they were eliminated in the semi-finals repêchage. Bakos died in Erina, New South Wales, Australia, on 12 December 2004, at the age of 72.
