= Ole Scavenius Jensen =

Danish rower (1921–1990)

Personal information
- Born: 21 March 1921 Copenhagen, Denmark
- Died: 30 May 1990 (aged 69)

Sport
- Sport: Rowing
Medal record
Men's rowing
Representing Denmark
European Rowing Championships
Silver medal – second place	1949 Amsterdam	Coxed pair
Silver medal – second place	1951 Mâcon	Eight
Gold medal – first place	1953 Copenhagen	Coxless four

Ole Scavenius Jensen (21 March 1921 – 30 May 1990) was a Danish rower. He competed at the 1952 Summer Olympics in Helsinki with the men's eight where they were eliminated in the semi-final repêchage.
