= Savino Dalla Puppa =

Italian rower

Personal information
- Nationality: Italian
- Born: 2 April 1929; Burano, Italy
- Died: 8 August 2009 (aged 80); Venice, Italy

Sport
- Sport: Rowing

Savino Dalla Puppa (2 April 1929 – 8 August 2009) was an Italian rower. He competed in the men's eight event at the 1952 Summer Olympics.
