= Bob Tinning =

Australian rower

Medal record

Men's rowing

Olympic Games
Bronze medal – third place	1952 Helsinki	Men's eight

British Empire Games
Gold medal – first place	1950 Auckland	eights

Robert Noel Tinning (25 December 1925 – 19 May 2001) was an Australian rower who competed in the 1952 Summer Olympics.

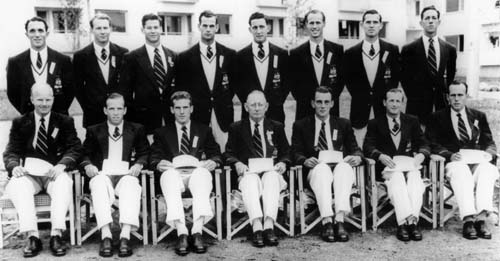
Tinning (seated far right) in the 1952 Olympic Rowing Squad

== Club and state rowing ==
He was schooled at St Joseph's College, Hunters Hill where he took up rowing. His senior club rowing was done from the Sydney Rowing Club.

Tinning's first state selection for New South Wales came in 1949 in the men's senior eight contesting the King's Cup at the annual Australian Interstate Regatta. Tinning rowed in the bow seat of the 1949 New South Wales eight which won the King's Cup. He rowed in further New South Wales King's Cup eights in 1950, 1951 and 1952. Those crews were victorious in 1950 and in 1951 by a blistering four-length margin.

== International representative rowing ==
The entire 1949 New South Wales King's Cup crew was selected to represent Australia in competition at the 1950 British Empire Games in Auckland. Tinning was in the crew that won the gold medal in the eights competition. For the 1952 Helsinki Olympics an all-New South Wales crew was selected twelve months in advance based on the 1951 King's Cup result.

The Olympic selection crew raced the 1952 King's Cup for New South Wales during its preparation and was comprehensively beaten by Victoria. The media then claimed the Victorian crew should be nominated instead. However the selector Joe Gould stuck with the selected crew since a number of them including stroke Phil Cayzer, had severe adverse reactions to the vaccinations they'd taken for overseas travel.

It was also mentioned that their fundraising responsibilities, some 7,000 pounds, impacted their preparation - the Australian Olympic Federation had only been able to fund four air tickets for the eight. Tinning was the bowman of that Australian Olympic men's eight who to their credit won the bronze medal in Helsinki. An orthopaedic surgeon, Tinning travelled as the official team doctor accompanying the Australian rowing squad who competed at the 1980 Moscow Olympics.
