= Peter Betz =

German rower

Personal information
- Nationality: German
- Born: 23 August 1929; Cologne, Germany
- Died: 29 May 1991 (aged 61)

Sport
- Sport: Rowing

Peter Betz (23 August 1929 – 29 May 1991) was a German rower. He competed in the men's eight event at the 1952 Summer Olympics.
