= Ștefan Konyelicska =

Romanian rower

Personal information
- Nationality: Romanian
- Born: 1 December 1929; Arad, Romania
- Died: 24 December 2013 (aged 84)

Sport
- Sport: Rowing

Ștefan Konyelicska (1 December 1929 – 24 December 2013) was a Romanian rower. He competed in the men's eight event at the 1952 Summer Olympics.
