= Jack Taylor (rower) =

Canadian rower

Personal information
- Born: 11 July 1928; Toronto, Ontario, Canada
- Died: 26 March 2016 (aged 87); Collingwood, Ontario, Canada

Sport
- Sport: Rowing

Jacob Taylor (11 July 1928 – 26 March 2016) was a Canadian rower. He competed in the men's eight event at the 1952 Summer Olympics.
