= Dino Nardin =

Italian rower

Personal information
- Nationality: Italian
- Born: 30 May 1932
- Died: 7 August 2010 (aged 78)

Sport
- Sport: Rowing

Dino Nardin (30 May 1932 – 7 August 2010) was an Italian rower. He competed in the men's eight event at the 1952 Summer Olympics.
