= Mogens Snogdahl =

Danish rower (1926–2023)

Personal information
- Born: 2 June 1926 Copenhagen, Denmark
- Died: 14 November 2023 (aged 97)
- Relatives: Jørn Snogdahl (brother)

Sport
- Sport: Rowing
Medal record
Men's rowing
Representing Denmark
European Rowing Championships
Silver medal – second place	1951 Mâcon	Eight

Mogens Eskild Snogdahl (2 June 1926 – 14 November 2023) was a Danish rower. Snogdahl was born in Copenhagen in 1926. He was the younger brother to Jørn Snogdahl. He competed at the 1952 Summer Olympics in Helsinki with the men's eight where they were eliminated in the semi-finals repêchage. Snogdahl died on 14 November 2023, at the age of 97.
