= Igor Borisov =

Russian rower (1924–2003)

Personal information
- Born: Igor Anddreyevich Borisov; 5 April 1924 Moscow, Russian SFSR, Soviet Union
- Died: 10 October 2003 (aged 79)

Sport
- Sport: Rowing
Medal record
Men's rowing
Representing the Soviet Union
Olympic Games
Silver medal – second place	1952 Helsinki	Eight
European Rowing Championships
Gold medal – first place	1953 Copenhagen	Eight
Gold medal – first place	1954 Amsterdam	Eight
Gold medal – first place	1955 Ghent	Eight

Igor Anddreyevich Borisov (Russian: Игорь Андреевич Борисов; 5 April 1924 – 10 October 2003) was a Russian rower who competed for the Soviet Union in the 1952 Summer Olympics.

In 1952, he won the silver medal as crew member of the Soviet boat in the eight event.
