= Tor Lundsten =

Finnish rower

Personal information
- Nationality: Finnish
- Born: 16 February 1926; Turku, Finland
- Died: 29 November 1970 (aged 44); Turku, Finland

Sport
- Sport: Rowing

Tor Lundsten (16 February 1926 – 29 November 1970) was a Finnish rower. He competed in the men's eight event at the 1952 Summer Olympics.
