= Leichhardt Rowing Club =

Rowing club in Sydney, Australia

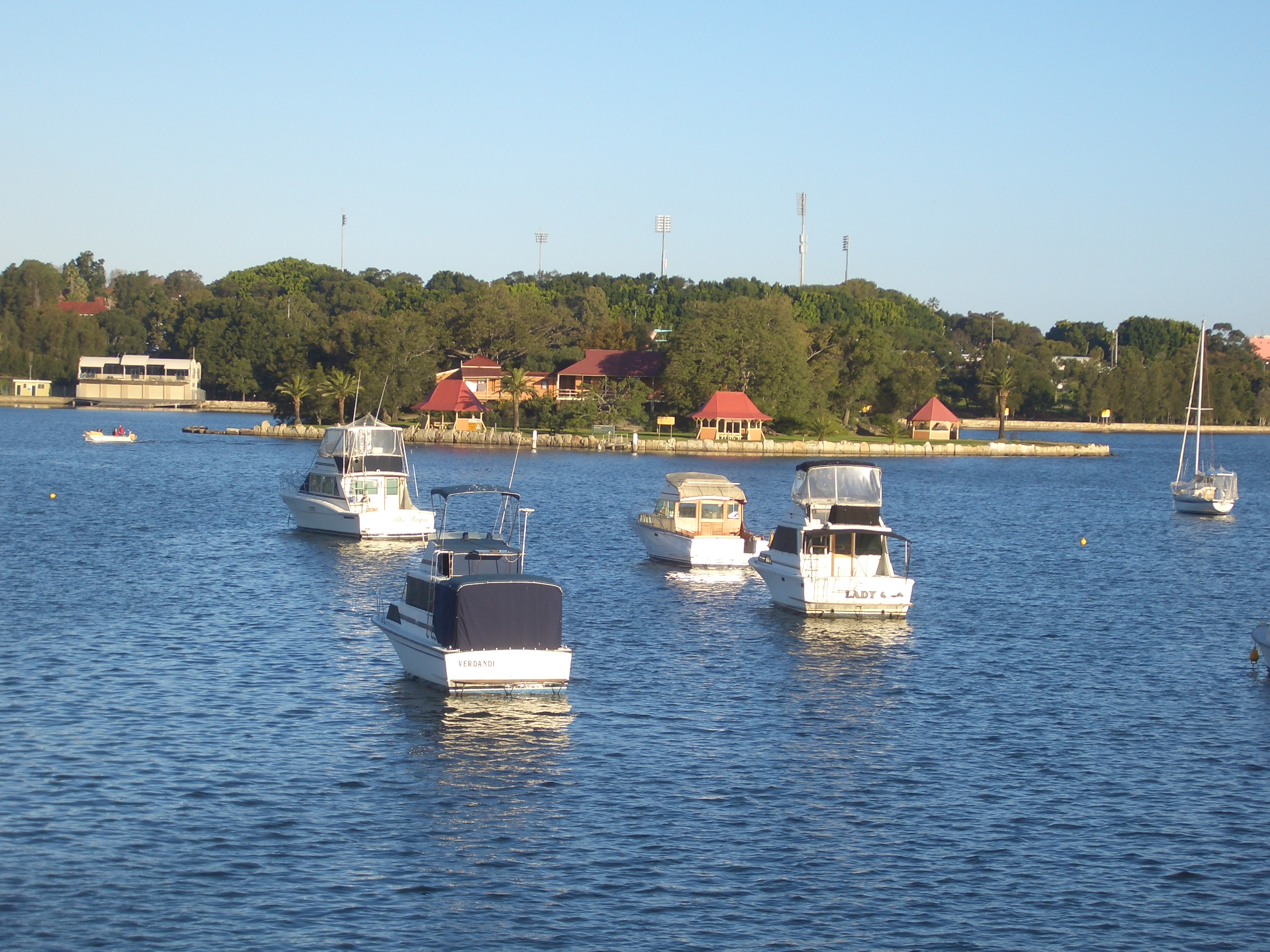
- Location: Leichhardt, Sydney, Australia
- Home water: Iron Cove, Sydney Harbour
- Founded: 29 May 1886
- Affiliations: NSW Rowing Association
- Website: www.lrc.com.au

Leichhardt Rowing Club formed in 1886 is one of the oldest rowing clubs in Sydney, Australia. The clubhouse has occupied sites on Port Jackson's, Iron Cove at Leichhardt since 1886. Leichhardt is an all-level competitive and recreational rowing club, with a long history of supporting women's rowing. The club has enjoyed a rebirth in the new millennium partly due to the success of its Masters, Corporate Challenge and learn-to-row programs as well as a cherished partnership with Pymble Ladies College.

== History ==
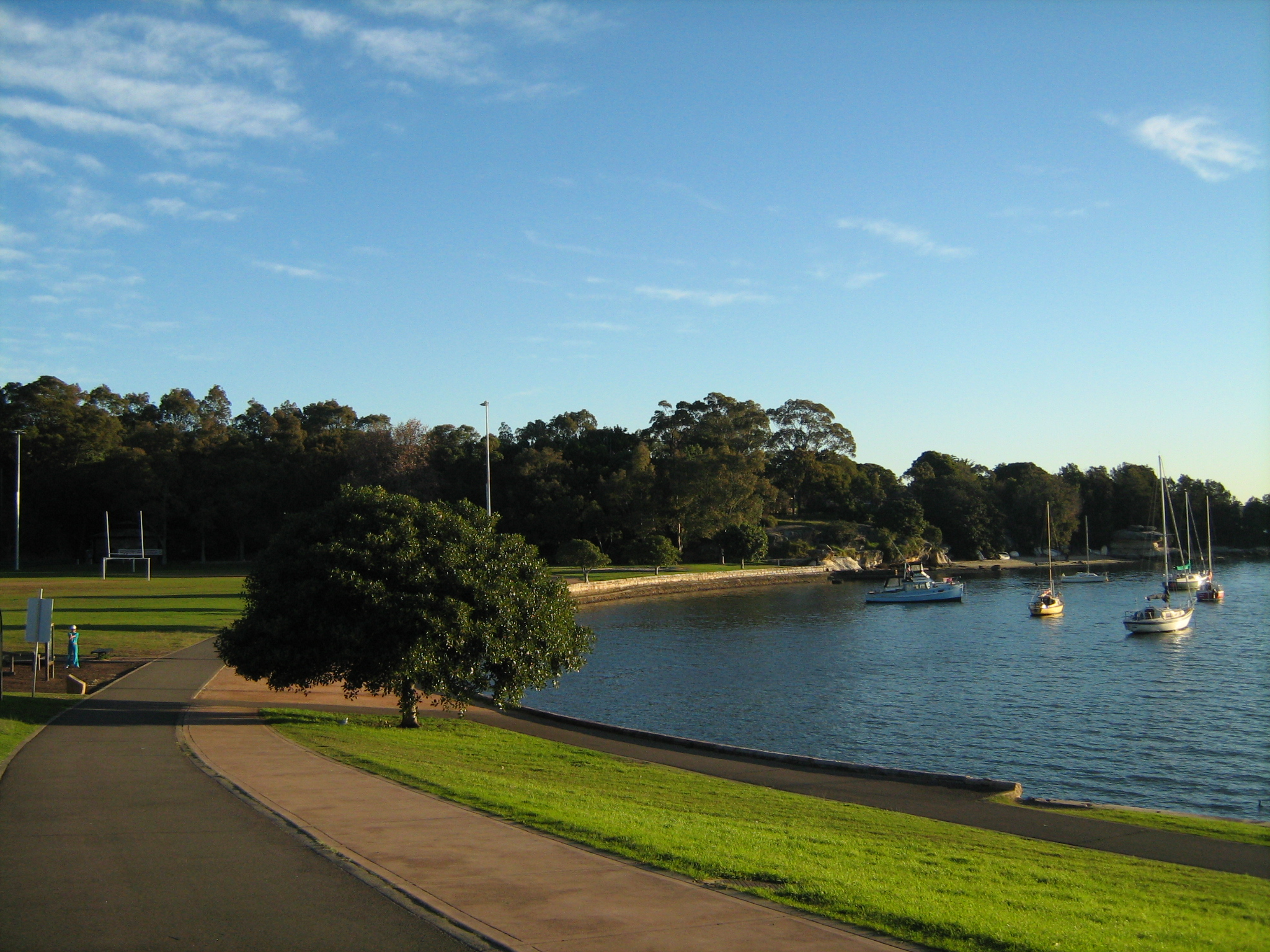
Park and foreshore immediately adjacent to the LRC

S.G Davison, the Mayor of Leichhardt presided over a public meeting at the Leichhardt Council Chambers on 29 May 1886 which was called for the purpose of forming a rowing club. Permission was obtained from the Crown for the Leichhardt Park Trustees to permit the use of water frontage for baths and rowing club sheds through the efforts of Solomon Hyam MLA. After a boatshed was built, Sir Henry Parkes, Premier of New South Wales formally opened the new club at a ceremony on 24 September 1887 before the largest group of people ever assembled on Leichhardt Park. The club was established free from the pressure of the amateur principle in place at Sydney and Mercantile. It was for both "manual labourers" and "brain toilers" and Parkes, who described rowing as "a healthy, beautiful and manly exercise", expressed his approval of the club's democratic principle regarding membership.

The club took delivery of its first boat – a single skiff – in late 1887. Life membership subscriptions paid by some of the foundation directors were used to fund a few further skiff purchases. Leichhardt was admitted to the New South Wales Rowing Association in March 1893. A severe storm fully destroyed the club and its fleet of boats in 1897 but rebuilding and replacement was fully complete by 1900. The club's initial racing colours were buff and blue but by 1902 club equipment was being painted in red and blue, the club's livery ever since.

Henry Hauenstein was the club's first selected Olympic competitor, rowing in the men's eight at Stockholm 1912. He had regularly appeared in the New South Wales state eight since 1907. Over 100 club members left to see active service in World War I and a number fell. After the armistice Hauenstein and fellow club-member Tom McGill rowed (along with Middleton of the Sydney Rowing Club) in the victorious AIF crew at Royal Peace Regatta who won the cup for eight-oared boats presented by King George V. In time, the King's Cup, became the trophy presented to the winning men's eight at the annual Australian Rowing Championships.

At the commencement of World War II the club had 40 active members. By the war's end 90 club members had served in the forces. The Australian Military Forces occupied the park, foreshore and clubhouse from 1943 and the boats were rehoused at the neighbouring Haberfield Rowing Club.

Leichhardt Rowing Club began co-operating with nearby ladies rowing clubs from about 1910. Women began rowing for the club in the 1950s. In 1976 the club constitution was changed to admit women as constitutional members.

The 1950s was a golden era for the club. Leichhardt won the Sydney premiership four times, including a hat trick, was runner-up four other times and third in the other two years. Four club men were selected for Olympic representation at Helsinki 1952 and five for Melbourne 1956.Although rowing no longer is part of the Empire/Commonwealth Games, there was one representative in 1950, four in 1954 (Canada), and eight in 1958 (Wales). The 1950s also produced a small but successful squad of Australian Championship women in four oared events with Lionel Robberds A.M.Q.C as both coxswain and coach. By 1976, the club constitution was amended to include women. Len Macpherson, club life member from 1961, recruited students from neighboring schools and by 1980 had achieved state and national success with representation at New Zealand and the Royal Canadian Henley. The mid-1980's with Michael (Mick) Lowrey as coach, achieved similar outcomes with students from Sydney Girls High School. In 1980, the administration of women's rowing in NSW was transferred to the New South Wales Rowing Association (NSWRA) and with that, the formal development of girls’ college rowing. Coach Lowrey was awarded Coach of the Year by the NSWRA for the 1990 – 1991 season. At one stage, women club members held both the national open and lightweight scull championship simultaneously. By 1994, Gillian Campbell, the first female club captain and 1992 Olympian, had been a sports mistress at Pymble Ladies College. Rowing was introduced to the college sports program and on an initiative by the college principal, Gillian Moore A.O, a strong partnership has been of great benefit to students, members and both parties since the late 1990s. The new millennium has introduced increased participation for both men and women in masters rowing whilst maintaining its junior development program. Club administration is dependent upon the voluntary efforts of the executive and committee. Most recently, at the 2020 annual general meeting, Daniela Borgert was elected club Captain after a successful representative State Masters career having first joined Leichhardt Rowing Club in the 1980s as a coxswain at just 14 years old.

== Club Presidents ==
Fred Walsh was the club's first President, holding the position from 1886 to 1893. FG Baker was president during World War II and instrumental in a new clubhouse built in 1940. However, by 1942, Neil McCallum as Club Captain provided support in negotiation with both council and military officials following wartime waterfront acquisitions in Leichhardt Park. The “new” clubhouse was then relocated to its current site.

Since 1946, thirteen members have served as president until 1985. Two of those as life members, Robert (Stan) Jones 1938 and Barry Moynahan 1970, were awarded the O.A.M for services to the club and sport in general. In the period from 1986 to 2001, the position of President was held by Robert W Stone, a former state champion oarsman and national winning coach who was signatory to the 2001 formal agreement with the Uniting Church and Pymble Ladies College. This unique event attracted formal negotiation from both state and national rowing associations. Approval at state government ministerial level was given to the long-term arrangement through a reserve trust. Notwithstanding the club/college partnership, a characteristic of all Presidents over many years has been the ability to actively engage members, parents ad retired rowers in support.

- 1886 – 1893: F Walsh
- 1894: CC Marshall
- 1895 – 1902: HS Brotherwood
- 1903: J Keep
- 1904 – 1915: G Nixon
- 1916 – 1935: TJ Hoskins
- 1936: WH Lambert
- 1937 – 1945: FG Baker
- 1946 – 1948: AD Watts
- 1949 – 1953: ACC Kayser
- 1954: AC Kayser/ J Hurley
- 1955: J Hurley
- 1956: DC Tanner
- 1957 – 1958: GV Reid
- 1959: GV Reid/HCB Edmondson
- 1960 – 1963: HCB Edmondson
- 1964: RS Jones
- 1965: DJ Docherty
- 1966 – 1967: RS Jones
- 1968: PM Evatt
- 1969 – 1970: LR Macpherson
- 1971 – 1975: B Moynahan
- 1976 – 1977: RS Jones
- 1978 – 1979: B Moynahan
- 1980 – 1981: V Williamson
- 1982 – 1985: NT McCallum
- 1986 – 2001: R Stone
- 2002 – 2003: B Moynahan
- 2004 – 2006: M Bath
- 2007 – 2012: T Clare
- 2013 – 2015: C Bartlett
- 2016 – 2018: J Milne
- 2019 – present: S Duff

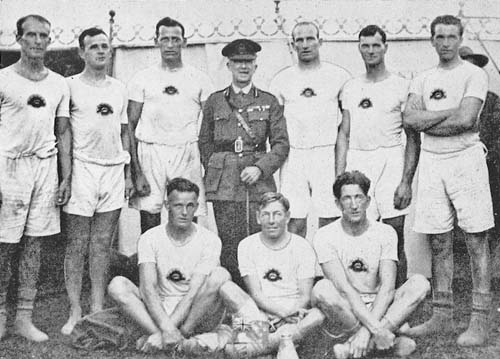
Standing with the AIF #1 VIII 1919 Henley Peace Regatta McGill (far right) & Hauenstein (left of officer)

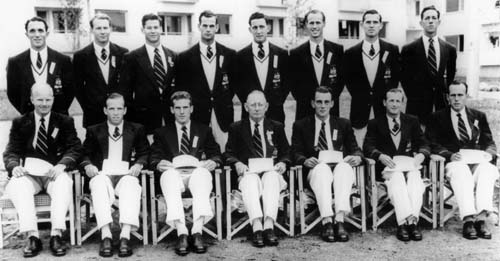
Four LRC men standing in the 1952 Olympic squad Anderson & Greenwood (2nd & 4th from left), Williamson right & Finlay 3rd from right

== Members ==
Notable past members include:

- W Lambert was Leichhardt's first state title holder winning the NSW Sculling Championship in 1894,1895 & 1899. He was later a Mayor of Leichhardt.
- Lt. Tom McGill was a member of the victorious AIF men's eight at the 1919 Royal Peace Regatta held following the end of World War I. He rowed in NSW King's Cup crews from 1920 to 1922.
- H.V. Evatt the Australian jurist, politician and writer who was leader of the Australian Labor Party from 1951 to 1960.
- Professor Frank Cotton – Renown athletic physiologist in the identification of athletic potential in the 1950s
- Peter Evatt – 1956 Olympian and national representative sculler and coach.
- John Harrison and Edward “Ted” Curtain – Both club Life Members and national representatives for their design and development of the “Leichhardt Rowing Ergometer” in the late 1950s based on the “Cotton” principals. Curtain was Club Captain 1956-1957 and 1959–1960.
- Steve Roll – Joined the club in 1952. State Champion in both Open and Lightweight rowing and sculling. Australian Sculling Champion in 1958, Commonwealth Games bronze medallist in 1958, Club Captain 1958 and 1961, and Life Member from 1961. In 2019 Steve is still active around the club as a valued coach.
- Lionel Robberds A.M.Q.C. – Australian representative coxswain at 14 years of age at the 1954 Commonwealth Games. Coxswain and coach in many winning State and National Championships over 20 years, Olympian and current Club Patron.
- William “Bill” Monaghan – Joined the Club in 1950. Loyal Club rower and volunteer, served as a committee member and active in the Masters rowing category in his 80s.
- Rusty Robertson – New Zealand Olympic and Australian National coach. In the late 1980s became a mentor to Leichhardt coaches and competitive members.

Olympic representative members include:

- Lt. Henry Hauenstein, Olympic competitor Stockholm 1912 and member of the victorious AIF men's eight at the 1919 Royal Peace Regatta.
- Arthur Bull, national sculling champion 1922 & 1923 and Olympic competitor Paris 1924.
- Mervyn Finlay, Nimrod Greenwood, Geoff Williamson and David Anderson Olympic bronze medallists Helsinki 1952.
- Stuart Mackenzie Olympic silver medalist Melbourne1956.
- Geoff Williamson, David Anderson, Peter Evatt and John Harrison Olympic competitors Melbourne 1956.
- Max Annett, Peter Waddington, John Hudson, Lionel Robberds (cox), and Ted Curtain (coach) were only Australian crew (a 4+) to make a final at Rome 1960.
- Peter Dickson Olympic silver medallist Mexico City 1968.
- Gillian Campbell competitor at Barcelona 1992 and the club's first female captain 1988–1992.
