= Slava Amiragov =

Soviet rower (1926–1990)

Personal information
- Born: Slava Lvovich Amiragov; 24 March 1926 Minsk, Byelorussian SSR, Soviet Union
- Died: 3 September 1990 (aged 64)

Sport
- Sport: Rowing
Medal record
Men's rowing
Representing the Soviet Union
Olympic Games
Silver medal – second place	1952 Helsinki	Eight
European Rowing Championships
Gold medal – first place	1953 Copenhagen	Eight
Gold medal – first place	1954 Amsterdam	Eight
Gold medal – first place	1955 Ghent	Eight

Slava Lvovich Amiragov (Russian: Слава Львович Амирагов, 24 March 1926 – 3 September 1990) was a Belarusian rower who competed for the Soviet Union in the 1952 Summer Olympics and in the 1956 Summer Olympics.

In 1952 he won the silver medal as crew member of the Soviet boat in the eights event.

Four years later he was part of the Soviet boat which was eliminated in the semi-final of the eight competition.
