= Preben Hoch =

Danish rower

Personal information
- Nationality: Danish
- Born: 10 December 1925; Skørping, Denmark
- Died: 12 July 2014 (aged 88); Munke Bjergby, Denmark

Sport
- Sport: Rowing

Preben Hoch (10 December 1925 – 12 July 2014) was a Danish rower. He competed in the men's eight event at the 1952 Summer Olympics.
