= Ragnar Ek =

Swedish rower (1922–1981)

Personal information
- Nationality: Swedish
- Born: 25 February 1922; Strömstad, Sweden
- Died: 23 March 1981 (aged 59); Strömstad, Sweden

Sport
- Sport: Rowing

Ragnar Ek (25 February 1922 – 23 March 1981) was a Swedish rower. He competed in the men's eight event at the 1952 Summer Olympics.
