= Esko Lyytikkä =

Finnish rower

Personal information
- Nationality: Finnish
- Born: 6 January 1929 Viipuri, Finland
- Died: 20 December 1997 (aged 68) Turku, Finland

Sport
- Sport: Rowing

Esko Lyytikkä (6 January 1929 – 20 December 1997) was a Finnish rower. He competed in the men's eight event at the 1952 Summer Olympics.
