= Brian Lloyd (rower) =

English rower (1927–1995)

Personal information
- Born: Charles Brian Murray Lloyd; 11 March 1927 Richmond, London
- Died: 19 July 1995 (aged 68) Surrey

Sport
- Sport: Rowing
Medal record
Men's rowing
Representing the United Kingdom
Olympic Games
Silver medal – second place	1948 London	Eight
European Rowing Championships
Bronze medal – third place	1950 Milan	Eight

Charles Brian Murray Lloyd (11 March 1927 – 19 July 1995) was an English rower who competed for Great Britain in the 1948 Summer Olympics and the 1952 Summer Olympics.

Lloyd was born at Richmond, London and attended the Shore School and St John's College, Cambridge, where he rowed for Lady Margaret Boat Club. In 1948 most of the victorious Cambridge crew of the Boat Race also rowed for Leander Club at Henley Royal Regatta and the Leander eight were then selected to row for Great Britain in the 1948 Summer Olympics. Lloyd was one of the replacements for Cambridge men who were ineligible for the Great Britain team. Great Britain went on to win the silver medal.

Lloyd was in the winning Cambridge crews in the 1949, 1950 and 1951 Boat Races. In 1949 he was in the Lady Margaret crew which won the Ladies' Challenge Plate at Henley Royal Regatta in record time. In 1951 he won Silver Goblets partnering James Crowden and stroked the Lady Margaret crew which won the Grand Challenge Cup. He was President of Cambridge University Boat Club in 1951 and took the Cambridge crew to the United States where they were undefeated. He also won a bronze medal in the European Championships in 1950. In 1952 he captained the Leander Club crew which won the Grand Challenge Cup at Henley, and went on to compete as the British boat which finished fourth in the eight competition in Helsinki.

Lloyd was a shipbroker. He died after a long illness in Surrey at the age of 68.

== See also ==
- List of Cambridge University Boat Race crews
