= Piero Attorrese =

Italian rower (1930–2021)

Personal information
- Nationality: Italian
- Born: 18 June 1930; Tortoreto, Kingdom of Italy
- Died: 3 June 2021 (aged 90); Genoa, Italy

Sport
- Sport: Rowing

Piero Attorrese (18 June 1930 – 3 June 2021) was an Italian rower. He competed in the men's eight event at the 1952 Summer Olympics.
