= Yrjö Hakoila =

Finnish rower

Personal information
- Nationality: Finnish
- Born: 19 January 1932; Turku, Finland
- Died: 10 December 1986 (aged 54); Turku, Finland

Sport
- Sport: Rowing

Yrjö Hakoila (19 January 1932 – 10 December 1986) was a Finnish rower. He competed in the men's eight event at the 1952 Summer Olympics.
