= Iosif Bergesz =

Romanian rower

Personal information
- Nationality: Romanian
- Born: 14 September 1921; Arad, Romania
- Died: Arad, Romania

Sport
- Sport: Rowing

Iosif Bergesz (born 14 September 1921, date of death unknown) was a Romanian rower. He competed in the men's eight event at the 1952 Summer Olympics.
