= Frank Young (rower) =

Canadian rower (1929–2018)

Personal information
- Born: August 5, 1929; Toronto, Ontario, Canada
- Died: October 18, 2018 (aged 89); St. Catharines, Ontario, Canada

Sport
- Sport: Rowing

Frank David Young (August 5, 1929 – October 18, 2018) was a Canadian rower. He competed in the men's eight event at the 1952 Summer Olympics.
