= Ted Chilcott =

Canadian rower

Personal information
- Nationality: Canadian
- Born: 19 February 1924
- Died: 1 April 2003 (aged 79); Toronto, Ontario, Canada

Sport
- Sport: Rowing

Albert Edward Chilcott (19 February 1924 – 1 April 2003) was a Canadian rower. He competed in the men's eight event at the 1952 Summer Olympics.
