= Sergio Ghiatto =

Italian rower

Personal information
- Nationality: Italian
- Born: 3 June 1928; Venice, Italy
- Died: 29 June 2012 (aged 84); Venice, Italy

Sport
- Sport: Rowing

Sergio Ghiatto (3 June 1928 – 29 June 2012) was an Italian rower. He competed in the men's eight event at the 1952 Summer Olympics.
