= Ernest Chapman =

Australian rower (1926–2013)

Olympic medal record

Men's rowing
Bronze medal – third place	1952 Helsinki	Men's eight

Ernest William Chapman, OAM (11 April 1926 – 21 March 2013) was an Australian rower and a lifelong clubman at the Sydney Rowing Club. He competed and won a bronze medal at the 1952 Summer Olympics.

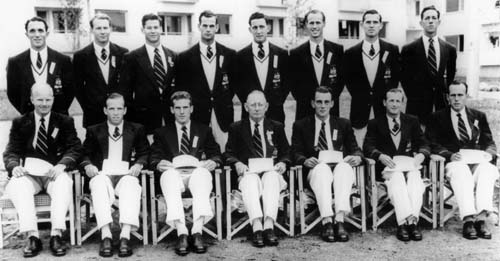
Chapman (back row far left) in the 1952 Olympic Rowing Squad

== School, club and state rowing ==
Chapman's rowing career started at the Balmain Rowing Club in Sydney but he switched allegiance to the Sydney Rowing Club at the end of the 1940s and commenced a long association with the Sydney club.

Chapman's first state selection for New South Wales came in 1950 as a reserve for the men's senior eight contesting the King's Cup at the annual Australian Interstate Regatta. He was a reserve for the New South Wales eights of 1951 and 1953 and rowed in the four seat of the 1952 King's Cup crew.

He served as vice-captain of Sydney Rowing Club for eight consecutive seasons from 1951. He was the club president in two tenures, firstly from 1975 to 1978 and then from 1979 till 1995.

From 1966 until 1972 Chapman coached the 1st Eight at Newington College in the Sydney GPS Head of the River from their boat shed at Abbotsford on the Parramatta River.

== International representative rowing ==
For the 1952 Helsinki Olympics an all New South Wales crew was selected twelve months in advance based on the 1951 King's Cup result. The Olympic selection crew raced the 1952 King's Cup for New South Wales during its preparation and was comprehensively beaten by Victoria. The media then claimed the Victorian crew should be nominated instead. However the selector Joe Gould stuck with the selected crew since a number of them including stroke Phil Cayzer, had severe adverse reactions to the vaccinations they'd taken for overseas travel. It was also mentioned that their fundraising responsibilities, some 7,000 pounds, impacted their preparation - the Australian Olympic Federation had only been able to fund four air tickets for the eight. Chapman was in the two seat of that Australian Olympic men's eight who to their credit won the bronze medal in Helsinki.

He was awarded a Medal of the Order of Australia (OAM) for his services to the sport of rowing.
