= Stanko Despot =

Croatian rower

Personal information
- Nationality: Croatian
- Born: 9 April 1928; Šibenik, Yugoslavia
- Died: 8 January 2002 (aged 73); Šibenik, Croatia

Sport
- Sport: Rowing

Stanko Despot (9 April 1928 – 8 January 2002) was a Croatian rower. He was born in Sibenik, Croatia (at the time Yugoslavia) in 1928 and died in 2002.

== Career ==
He competed in the men's eight event at the 1952 Summer Olympics.
