= Rune Andersson (rower) =

Swedish rower

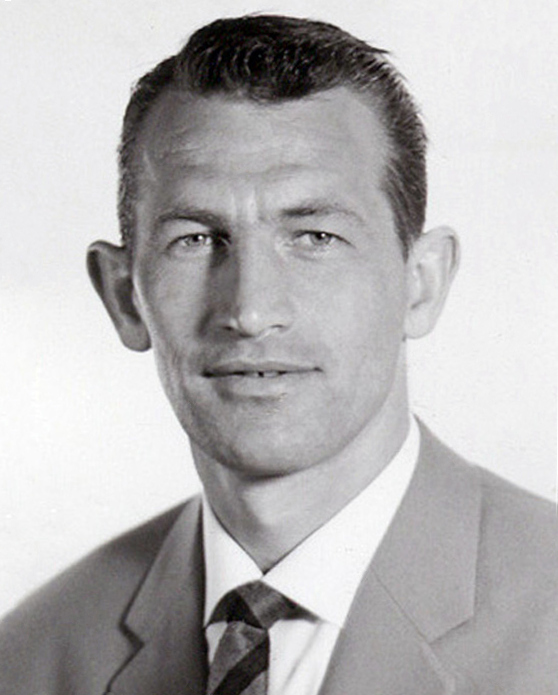

Personal information
- Born: 11 May 1930 Strömstad, Sweden
- Died: 9 October 2006 (aged 76) Strömstad, Sweden

Sport
- Sport: Rowing
- Club: Roddklubben Three Towns; Strömstads Roddklubb
Medal record
Representing Sweden
European Rowing Championships
| Silver medal – second place | 1955 Ghent | Eight |

Rune Ivar Charles Andersson (11 May 1930 – 9 October 2006) was a Swedish rower who won a silver medal in the eights at the 1955 European Championships. He competed in this event at the 1952, 1956 and 1960 Olympics and finished fourth in 1956.
