= Heinz Zünkler =

German rower (1929–2018)

Personal information
- Nationality: German
- Born: 28 September 1929; Cologne, Germany
- Died: 29 July 2018 (aged 88)

Sport
- Sport: Rowing

Heinz Zünkler (28 September 1929 – 29 July 2018) was a German rower. He competed in the men's eight event at the 1952 Summer Olympics.
