= Manuel Regala =

Portuguese rower

Personal information
- Nationality: Portuguese
- Born: 4 January 1931

Sport
- Sport: Rowing

Manuel Regala (born 4 January 1931, date of death unknown) was a Portuguese rower. He competed in the men's eight event at the 1952 Summer Olympics.
