= Ion Niga =

Romanian rower (1925–2011)

Personal information
- Nationality: Romanian
- Born: 23 December 1925 Nădlac, Romania
- Died: March 2011 (aged 85) Timișoara, Romania

Sport
- Sport: Rowing

Ion Niga (23 December 1925 – March 2011) was a Romanian rower. He competed in the men's eight event at the 1952 Summer Olympics. Niga died in Timișoara in March 2011, at the age of 85.
