= Zdenko Bego =

Yugoslav rowing cox (1933–2014)

Personal information
- Born: 12 February 1933 Split, Croatia, Yugoslavia
- Died: 20 December 2014 (aged 81) Split, Croatia

Sport
- Sport: Rowing
Medal record
Men's rowing
Representing Yugoslavia
European Rowing Championships
Bronze medal – third place	1954 Amsterdam	Eight

Zdenko Bego (12 February 1933 – 20 December 2014) was a Yugoslav rowing cox. He competed at the 1952 Summer Olympics in Helsinki with the men's eight where they were eliminated in the semi-finals repêchage.
