= Ladislav Matetić =

Croatian rower

Personal information
- Nationality: Croatian
- Born: 9 August 1927; Zlatibor, Yugoslavia
- Died: 24 February 2016 (aged 88)

Sport
- Sport: Rowing

Ladislav Matetić (9 August 1927 – 24 February 2016) was a Croatian rower. He competed in the men's eight event at the 1952 Summer Olympics.
