= Stefan Reinartz (rower) =

German rower

Personal information
- Nationality: German
- Born: 20 September 1925; Cologne, Germany
- Died: 5 July 2007 (aged 81)

Sport
- Sport: Rowing

Stefan Reinartz (20 September 1925 – 5 July 2007) was a German rower. He competed in the men's eight event at the 1952 Summer Olympics.
