= Roland Freihoff =

German rower (1931–2025)

Personal information
- Nationality: German
- Born: 11 September 1931; Duisburg, Germany
- Died: 16 January 2025 (aged 93)

Sport
- Sport: Rowing

Roland Freihoff (11 September 1931 – 16 January 2025) was a German rower. He competed in the men's eight event at the 1952 Summer Olympics.
