= Bo Westlake =

Canadian rower (1927–2019)

Henry Mounfield "Bo" Westlake (25 May 1927 – 13 January 2019) was a Canadian rower who competed in the 1952 Summer Olympics.

== Biography ==
Henry Westlake had spent part of his childhood in Parkdale, Toronto. He was an oarsman at the Argonaut Rowing Club.

Westlake captained the 1952 Canadian Olympic heavyweight 8-oared crew in Helsinki, Finland.

He retired as a Marine Manager with Imperial Oil.

Westlake was married to Marlene (nee Martin) for 67 years. They had children named Dale (Paul) Melanson, Laurel Christie, and Scott (Linda) Westlake.
