= José Pinheiro (rowing) =

Portuguese rower

Personal information
- Nationality: Portuguese
- Born: 19 March 1933 (age 92)

Sport
- Sport: Rowing

José Pinheiro (born 19 March 1933) is a Portuguese rower. He competed in the men's eight event at the 1952 Summer Olympics.
