= Sture Baatz =

Swedish rower

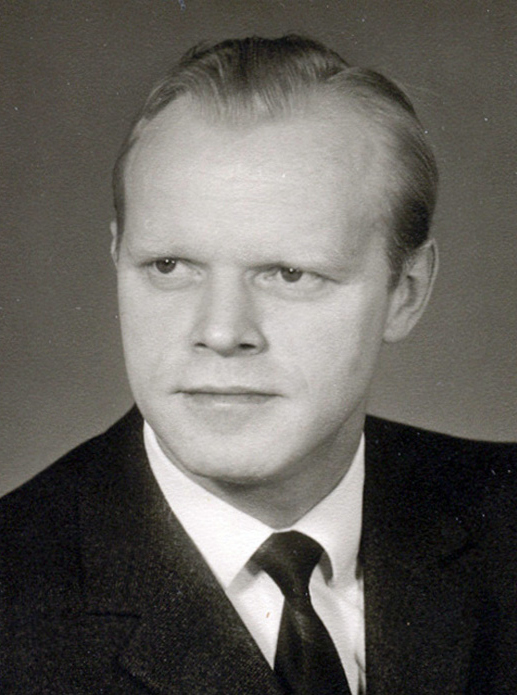

Personal information
- Born: 26 August 1929 Strömstad, Sweden
- Died: 14 February 2004 (aged 74) Lysekil, Sweden

Sport
- Sport: Rowing
- Club: Strömstads Roddklubb

Sture Bengt Lorentz Baatz (26 August 1929 – 14 February 2004) was a Swedish rower. He competed in the eights at the 1952 and 1960 Summer Olympics, but failed to reach the finals.
