= 1954 European Rowing Championships =

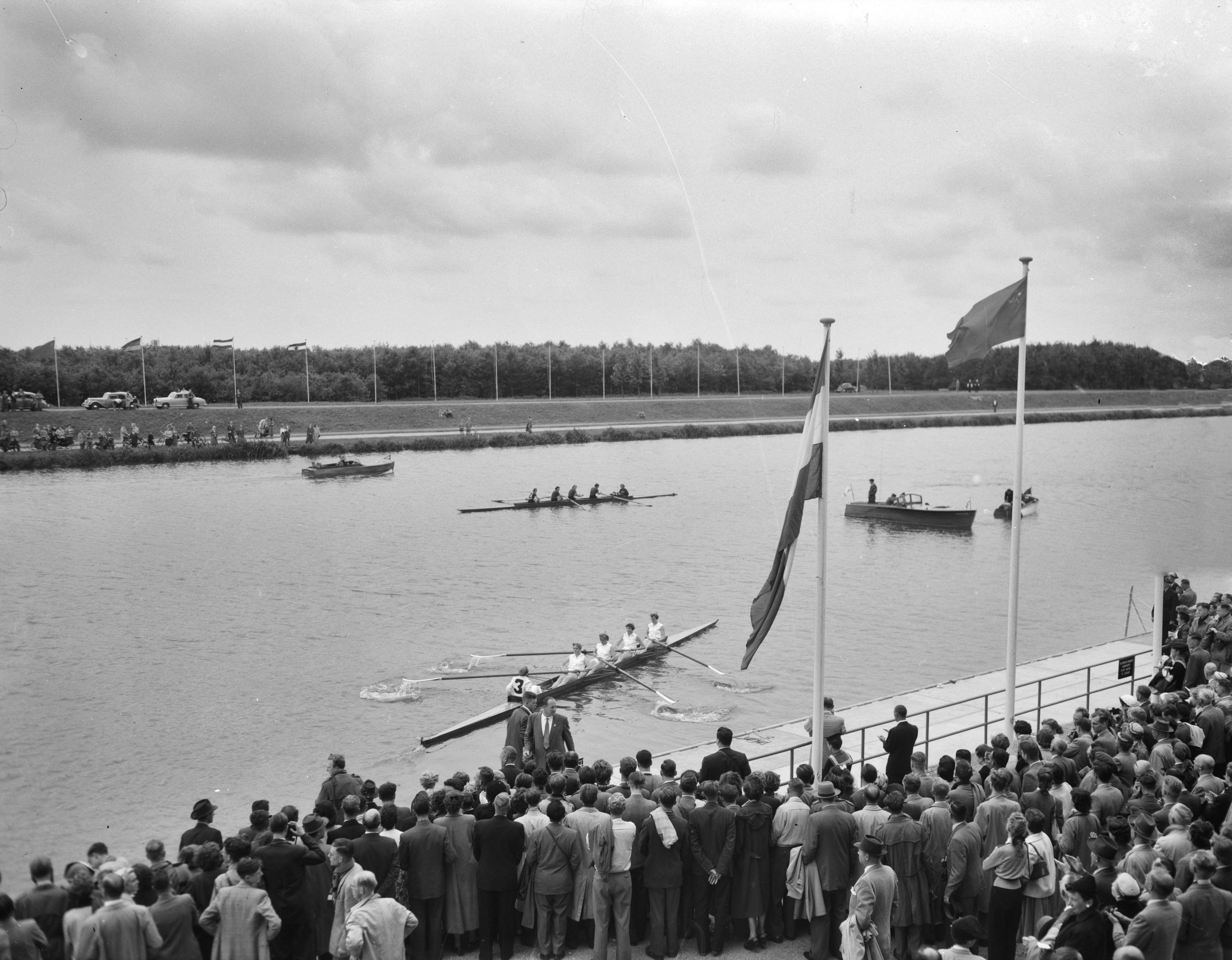
- Venue: Bosbaan
- Location: Amsterdam, the Netherlands
- Dates: 20–22 August 1954 (women); 26–29 August 1954 (men)

The 1954 European Rowing Championships were rowing championships held on the Bosbaan regatta course in the Dutch city of Amsterdam. This edition is particularly notable for the fact that it was the first time that women were allowed to compete as part of the championships, after three years of trial regattas for them. Women from 13 countries were represented with 34 boats, and they competed in five boat classes (W1x, W2x, W4x+, W4+, W8+) from 20 to 22 August. The men competed in all seven Olympic boat classes (M1x, M2x, M2-, M2+, M4-, M4+, M8+) a week later, from 26 to 29 August. It would be another 22 years until women would first be allowed to compete at Olympic level in 1976.

== Medal summary – women's events ==
For the 1954 regatta, the Bosbaan was widened from five lanes to six. All of the boat classes had single-digit entries (five crews each for the eight and quad, and nine for the singles), just four of the lanes were used in the races so that there were heats, repêchages, and a final.

Event	Gold		Silver		Bronze	
Event	Country & rowers	Time	Country & rowers	Time	Country & rowers	Time
W1x	Soviet Union; Roza Chumakova		Austria; Eva Sika		Netherlands; Agnes Reuter	
W2x	Soviet Union; Larissa Tsausova; Zoja Rakickaya		West Germany; Maritta Golz; Hermine Heyden		Czechoslovakia; Svetla Bartakova; Hana Musilova	
W4+	Soviet Union; Lidia Walshuk; Lyudmila Blasko; Lidja Kirsanova; Natalya Morozova; Valentina Ogorodnikova (cox)		Netherlands; Berbertje Vochteloo; Ans de Mey; Marjolijne van Lith; Everdina Lafeber; Liesbeth de Wit (cox)		Great Britain; Iris Simpson; Bette Shubrook; Barbara Benzing; Marjorie Lutz; Rita Walkerdine (cox)	
W4x+	Soviet Union; Yelena Serbasova; Tamara Tarskova; Natalia Sanina; Klavdija Ulogova; Rosa Seremetyeva (cox)		Austria; Lisbeth Kaibitsch; Lore Kafka; Sigrid Freuis; Hilde Unterberger; Irma Roth (cox)		Netherlands; Hendrika Teuben; Grieta Paulen; Frida van der Hoop; Helena Koster; Sonja van de Kastelen (cox)	
W8+	Soviet Union; Irina Lobnyeva; Nina Martinova; Ekaterina Kopilova; Marina Schirtladse; Larissa Koncewaja; Alexandra Sonnova; Nina Sevruk; Jelena Lukatyna; Valentina Okorodnikova (cox)		Romania; Maria Maimon; Laura Mitroi; Ghizela Rostas; Elisabeta Gyorgy; Rita Schob; Mariana Vatan; Marta Kardos; Sonia Bulugioiu; Angela Codreanu (cox)		Netherlands; Jacoba Stefels; Janneke Loman; Willemijn Domhoff; Gwendoline van der Feltz; Johanna Moltzer; Magda Schepers; Helena Kouwenaar; Johanna Minnema; Jeanette Molenaar (cox)	

== Medal summary – men's events ==
Event	Gold		Silver		Bronze	
Event	Country & rowers	Time	Country & rowers	Time	Country & rowers	Time
M1x	Switzerland; Alain Colomb		Poland; Teodor Kocerka		Soviet Union; Aleksandr Berkutov	
M2x	West Germany; Thomas Schneider; Gerhard Häge		Switzerland; Peter Stebler; Erich Schriever		Soviet Union; Heorhiy Zhylin; Ihor Yemchuk	
M2-	Denmark; Finn Pedersen; Kjeld Østrøm		Soviet Union; Igor Buldakov; Viktor Ivanov		United Kingdom; Christopher Davidge; David Macklin	
M2+	Switzerland; Gottfried Kottmann; Rolf Streuli; Walter Ludin (cox)		France; Claude Martin; Édouard Leguery; Daniel Forget (cox)		Belgium; René Verhoeven; Joseph van Thillo; Willy Vlaminckx (cox)	
M4-	Italy; Giuseppe Moioli; Giovanni Zucchi; Francesco Lazzari; Attilio Cantoni		United Kingdom; Gavin Sorrell; Colin Porter; Sidney Rand; Michael Beresford		Switzerland; Rico Bianchi; Karl Weidmann; Émile Ess; Heini Scheller	
M4+	Soviet Union; Yuriy Tyukalov; Yevgeny Kuznetsov; Fyodor Suo; Yevgeny Stirotinsky; Yuri Nosov (cox)		Denmark; Knud Jensen; Poul Locht; Eigil Krogh; Börge Krogh; Ejvind Christensen (cox)		Czechoslovakia; Karel Mejta; Jiří Havlis; Jan Jindra; Stanislav Lusk; Radomír Plšek (cox)	
M8+	Soviet Union; Yevgeny Brago; Vladimir Rodimushkin; Slava Amiragov; Yevgeny Samsonov; Igor Borisov; Leonid Gissen; Aleksey Komarov; Vladimir Kryukov; Nikolai Kolosovsky (cox)		Denmark; Flemming Nimb; Kjeld Larsen; Børge Hougaard; Svend Erik Schougaard; Wesley Ernest Pedersen; Walter Schröder; Kurt Andersen Krog; Aage Nielsen Drejer; Finn Hansen Aabye (cox)		Yugoslavia; Ivo Sirisević; Ante Marinović; Filip Kozulić; Zsivko Kraljić; Joszip Biliškov; Veljko Kukolj; Bozsidar Makjanić; Mihajlo Obradović; Zdenko Bego (cox)	
