= Vojko Šeravić =

Croatian rower

Personal information
- Nationality: Croatian
- Born: 22 October 1926; Split, Yugoslavia
- Died: 28 February 2006 (aged 79); Thousand Oaks, California, United States

Sport
- Sport: Rowing

Vojko Šeravić (22 October 1926 – 28 February 2006) was a Croatian rower. He competed in the men's eight event at the 1952 Summer Olympics.
