= Tibor Nádas =

Hungarian rower (1925–1968)

Personal information
- Nationality: Hungarian
- Born: 15 March 1925 Budapest, Hungary
- Died: 3 October 1968 (aged 43) Budapest, Hungary

Sport
- Sport: Rowing

Tibor Nádas (15 March 1925 – 3 October 1968) was a Hungarian rower. He competed at the 1948 Summer Olympics and the 1952 Summer Olympics.
