= John Niklasson =

Swedish rower

John Niklasson (6 June 1923, Öddö – 24 September 2006, Stromstad) was a Swedish rower. He was a member of Sweden's men's eights team at the 1952 Summer Olympics.
