= Nicholas Clack =

British rower

Personal information
- Born: 17 August 1930 (age 95) Witney, England

Sport
- Sport: Rowing
- Club: RAF RC
Medal record
Men's rowing
Representing England
British Empire & Commonwealth Games
Silver medal – second place	1954 Vancouver	Coxless pairs
Representing Great Britain
European Rowing Championships
Gold medal – first place	1951 Mâcon	Eight

Nicholas Barry Menzies Clack (born 17 August 1930) is a British rower.

== Biography ==
Clack was educated at Wycliffe College, then the Royal Naval College in Dartmouth before entering St John's College, Cambridge. He competed in The Boat Race 1952 for Lady Margaret Boat Club.

Clack competed at the 1952 Summer Olympics in Helsinki with the men's coxless four where they came fourth.

He represented England and won a silver medal in the coxless pairs with Tom Christie at the 1954 British Empire and Commonwealth Games in Vancouver, Canada.
