= Ottorino Enzo =

Italian rower

Personal information
- Nationality: Italian
- Born: 14 July 1926; Burano, Italy
- Died: 20 March 2012 (aged 85)

Sport
- Sport: Rowing

Ottorino Enzo (14 July 1926 – 20 March 2012) was an Italian rower. He competed in the men's eight event at the 1952 Summer Olympics.
