= Gösta Adamsson =

Swedish rower

Personal information
- Nationality: Swedish
- Born: 17 November 1924; Oslo, Norway
- Died: 14 January 2013 (aged 88); Strömstad, Sweden

Sport
- Sport: Rowing

Gösta Napoleon Adamsson (17 November 1924 – 14 January 2013) was a Norwegian-born rower who represented Sweden. He competed in the 1952 Summer Olympics.
