= Lennart Andersson (rower) =

Swedish rower

Personal information
- Nationality: Swedish
- Born: 30 July 1925; Strömstad, Sweden
- Died: 27 November 2004 (aged 79); Stenungsund, Sweden

Sport
- Sport: Rowing

Lennart Andersson (30 July 1925 – 27 November 2004) was a Swedish rower. He competed at the 1952 Summer Olympics and the 1956 Summer Olympics.
