= John Vilhelmsen =

Danish rower (1934–2010)

Personal information
- Born: 12 October 1934 Copenhagen, Denmark
- Died: 17 June 2010 (aged 75)

Sport
- Sport: Rowing
Medal record
Men's rowing
Representing Denmark
European Rowing Championships
Silver medal – second place	1949 Amsterdam	Coxed pair
Silver medal – second place	1951 Mâcon	Eight

John Vilhelmsen (also known as Wilhelmsen; 12 October 1934 – 17 June 2010) was a Danish coxswain. He competed at the 1952 Summer Olympics in Helsinki with the men's eight where they were eliminated in the semi-final repêchage. Vilhelmsen died on 17 June 2010, at the age of 75.
