= Vladimir Horvat =

Croatian rower

Personal information
- Nationality: Croatian
- Born: 12 June 1926; Sira, Yugoslavia
- Died: 14 May 1984 (aged 57); Camden, New Jersey, United States

Sport
- Sport: Rowing

Vladimir Horvat (12 June 1926 – 14 May 1984) was a Croatian rower. He competed in the men's eight event at the 1952 Summer Olympics.
