= Eero Lehtovirta =

Finnish rower

Personal information
- Nationality: Finnish
- Born: 28 November 1926; Nödinge, Sweden
- Died: 27 June 2003 (aged 76)

Sport
- Sport: Rowing

Eero Lehtovirta (28 November 1926 – 27 June 2003) was a Finnish rower. He competed in the men's eight event at the 1952 Summer Olympics.
