= Drago Husjak =

Croatian rower

Personal information
- Nationality: Croatian
- Born: 4 March 1926; Zagreb, Yugoslavia
- Died: 3 September 1987 (aged 61); Zagreb, Yugoslavia

Sport
- Sport: Rowing

Drago Husjak (4 March 1926 – 3 September 1987) was a Croatian rower. He competed in the men's eight event at the 1952 Summer Olympics.
