= Miklós Zágon =

Hungarian rower

Personal information
- Nationality: Hungarian
- Born: 19 March 1920; Budapest, Hungary
- Died: 24 September 1984 (aged 64)

Sport
- Sport: Rowing

Miklós Zágon (19 March 1920 – 24 September 1984) was a Hungarian rower. He competed at the 1948 Summer Olympics and the 1952 Summer Olympics.
