= Birger Andersson (rower) =

Finnish rower

Personal information
- Nationality: Finnish
- Born: 2 November 1925; Turku, Finland
- Died: 28 December 2004 (aged 79); Porvoo, Finland

Sport
- Sport: Rowing

Birger Andersson (2 November 1925 – 28 December 2004) was a Finnish rower. He competed in the men's eight event at the 1952 Summer Olympics.
