= David Macklin (rower) =

British rower

Personal information
- Born: David Drury Macklin; 1 September 1928 Cambridge
- Died: 29 March 2015 (aged 86)

Sport
- Sport: Rowing
Medal record
Men's rowing
Representing Great Britain
European Rowing Championships
Bronze medal – third place	1950 Milan	Eight
Gold medal – first place	1951 Mâcon	Eight
Bronze medal – third place	1954 Amsterdam	Coxless pair

David Drury Macklin CBE (1 September 1928 – 29 March 2015) was a British international rower.

Macklin was born in Cambridge in 1928. He attended St John's College, Cambridge, and rowed for Cambridge in the 1951 Boat Race in which Oxford sank. This forced a re-row which Cambridge won by 12 lengths. He and his college crew also won the Grand Challenge Cup at Henley in 1951, the last college crew to do so.

Macklin went on to row for Leander Club, winning the Grand Challenge Cup in 1952 and 1953. He was selected for Great Britain and rowed in the men's eight at the 1952 Summer Olympics in Helsinki, being part of the crew who finished fourth.

Macklin became the chief executive of Devon County Council. He died on 29 March 2015, survived by his wife Janet and their four children. In the 2016 Boat Races, Macklin's granddaughter Fiona Macklin rowed for Cambridge.
