= Branko Belačić =

Croatian rower

Personal information
- Nationality: Croatian
- Born: 26 October 1929; Zagreb, Yugoslavia
- Died: 16 March 2008 (aged 78); Costa Mesa, California, United States

Sport
- Sport: Rowing

Branko Belačić (26 October 1929 – 16 March 2008) was a Croatian rower. He competed in the men's eight event at the 1952 Summer Olympics.
