= Hans Betz =

German rower

Personal information
- Nationality: German
- Born: 14 June 1931 (age 93); Cologne, Germany

Sport
- Sport: Rowing

Hans Betz (born 14 June 1931) is a German rower. He competed in the men's eight event at the 1952 Summer Olympics.
