= Michael Reinartz =

German rower

Personal information
- Nationality: German
- Born: 24 December 1928; Cologne, Germany
- Died: 20 January 2001 (aged 72)

Sport
- Sport: Rowing

Michael Reinartz (24 December 1928 – 20 January 2001) was a German rower. He competed in the men's eight event at the 1952 Summer Olympics.
