= László Márton =

Hungarian rower

Personal information
- Nationality: Hungarian
- Born: 22 August 1923; Soponya, Hungary
- Died: 25 January 1989 (aged 65); Budapest, Hungary

Sport
- Sport: Rowing

László Márton (22 August 1923 – 25 January 1989) was a Hungarian rower. He competed in the men's eight event at the 1952 Summer Olympics.
