= Anton Reinartz =

German rower

Personal information
- Nationality: German
- Born: 26 December 1926; Cologne, Germany
- Died: 31 October 2002 (aged 75)

Sport
- Sport: Rowing

Anton Reinartz (26 December 1926 – 31 October 2002) was a German rower. He competed in the men's eight event at the 1952 Summer Olympics.
