= Boris Beljak =

Croatian rower

Personal information
- Nationality: Croatian
- Born: 26 August 1930; Zagreb, Yugoslavia
- Died: 5 January 2013 (aged 82); Long Beach, California, United States

Sport
- Sport: Rowing

Boris Beljak (26 August 1930 – 5 January 2013) was a Croatian rower. He competed in the men's eight event at the 1952 Summer Olympics.
