= Phil Cayzer =

Australian rower

Personal information
- Born: 13 May 1922 Sydney, New South Wales
- Died: 15 July 2015 (aged 93) Sydney, New South Wales
- Education: St Joseph's College, Hunters Hill
- Spouse: Melva Cayzer

Sport
- Club: Sydney Rowing Club; Mercantile Rowing Club
Medal record
Men's rowing
Olympic Games
Bronze medal – third place	1952 Helsinki	Men's eight
British Empire Games
Gold medal – first place	1950 Auckland	Men's eight

Philip Arthur Cayzer OAM, (13 May 1922 – 15 July 2015) was an Australian national champion rower who won medals in the 1952 Summer Olympics and the 1950 British Empire Games. He coached at state and national representative level taking Australian Olympic crews to success in the 1960s.

== Rowing career ==
Cayzer was schooled at St Joseph's College, Hunters Hill and his senior rowing was done with the Sydney Rowing Club with whom Cayzer would have a lifelong association. During the 1970s in Melbourne he would be a senior clubman at the Mercantile club.

He stroked the New South Wales representative eight in the King's Cup at the Interstate Regatta within the Australian Rowing Championships on five occasions from 1948 to 1954. Those crews won the national championship in 1949, 1950 and 1951. Following New South Wales' 1949 win in the King's Cup, the crew was selected in toto to represent Australia in the eights competition at the Empire Games at Lake Karapiro in February 1950, where Cayzer stroked the crew to victory over New Zealand by just a foot. The New South Wales 1950 Kings Cup win also resulted in the opportunity to represent Australia and the crew travelled to the Canterbury Centennial Games and 1951 New Zealand Championships, defeating the University of California by a canvas in both races.

An all-New South Wales crew was selected to represent Australia at the 1952 Henley Royal Regatta and 1952 Helsinki Olympics. At Henley in the final for the Grand Challenge Cup the crew, again stroked by Cayzer, placed second to Leander by 0.8 seconds. The same crew then competed in the Olympic eights in Helsinki, winning a bronze medal behind USA and Russia.

== Coaching career ==
After retiring from rowing Cayzer took up coaching. He was the Senior Coach at the Sydney Rowing Club for most for the sixties while also coaching numerous New South Wales representative Kings Cup crews. He coached the coxed four of Alf Duval, Alan Grover, Mick Allan, John Campbell and Gary Herford selected to compete at Tokyo 1964. He drove Sydney Rowing Club's association with Olympic representative crews recruiting a number of national senior rowers to join Duval, Grover and Joe Fazio at Sydney to create the men's eight for the 1968 Summer Olympics. He coached the crew both in Australia and in Mexico.

In the 1970s Cayzer relocated to Melbourne for business and became actively involved at the Mercantile club, rowing in social crews and becoming one of the club's most senior coaches. He returned to Sydney in the 1980s and continued to coach club, state and national crews till the early 2000s.

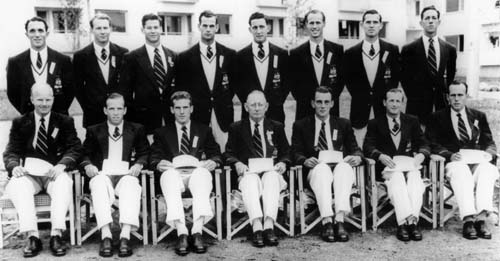
Cayzer (seated 2nd from left) in the 1952 Olympic Rowing Squad
