= Geoff Williamson =

Australian rower

Personal information
- Nationality: Australian
- Born: 10 July 1923 Sydney, Australia
- Died: 17 September 2009 (aged 86)

Sport
- Sport: Rowing
Medal record
Men's rowing
Representing Australia
Men's rowing
Bronze medal – third place	1952 Helsinki	Men's eight
British Empire (and Commonwealth) Games
Gold medal – first place	1954 Vancouver	Coxed four
Bronze medal – third place	1954 Vancouver	Coxless pair

Geoffrey Williamson (10 July 1923 – 17 September 2009) was an Australian rower who competed in the 1952 Summer Olympics and in the 1956 Summer Olympics.

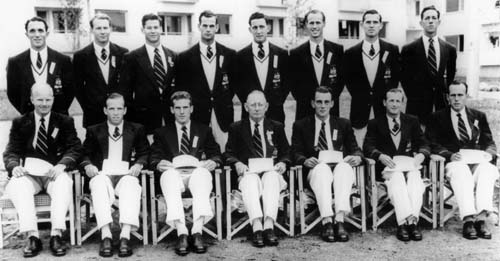
Williamson (back row right) in the 1952 Olympic Rowing Squad

His senior rowing was done from the Leichhardt Rowing Club in Sydney. In 1952 he was a crew member of the Australian boat which won the bronze medal in the eights event.

Four years later he rowed on the five seat of the Australian boat which was eliminated in the semi-final of the coxless four competition.
