= 1951 European Rowing Championships =

- Venue: Mâcon regatta course
- Location: Mâcon, France
- Dates: 23 August 1951 (women) & 24–? August 1951 (men)

The 1951 European Rowing Championships were rowing championships held on the Mâcon regatta course on the Saône in Mâcon, France. Men competed in all seven Olympic boat classes (M1x, M2x, M2-, M2+, M4-, M4+, M8+). The regatta is notable as the first test event for international women's rowing organised by the International Rowing Federation (FISA), with four countries competing in four boat classes (W1x, W2x, W4+, W8+) over the shorter race distance of 1,000 m (men competed over 2,000 m). The purpose of the test event was to see whether women's rowing should formally become part of the FISA-organised European Rowing Championships.

== Women's test event ==
The French rowing association (Fédération Française de Sociétés d’Aviron) organised the test event. Four countries sent teams; France, Great Britain, the Netherlands, and Denmark. The four boat classes competed in were the single scull (W1x), double scull (W2x), coxed four (W4+), and eight (W8+). There were three boats nominated for the double scull, but all countries had boats compete in the other boat classes. Great Britain came third in all four races.

The women would have their second test event in Amsterdam in 1952. There were no European Rowing Championships that year as the Olympic Games were held in Helsinki, and whenever the Olympic Games were held in Europe the European Rowing Championships would be skipped. The same four countries competed in Amsterdam in the same four boat classes.

== Medal summary – men's events ==
Event	Gold		Silver		Bronze	
Event	Country & rowers	Time	Country & rowers	Time	Country & rowers	Time
M1x	Denmark; Erik Larsen		Great Britain; Tony Fox		Switzerland; Paul Meyer	
M2x	Switzerland; Peter Stebler; Émile Knecht		Italy; Silvio Bergamini; Antonio Balossi		Sweden; Tore Johansson; Curt Brunnqvist	
M2-	Belgium; Michel Knuysen; Bob Baetens		Denmark; Bent Jensen; Palle Tillisch		Switzerland; Hans Kalt; Kurt Schmid	
M2+	Italy; Giuseppe Ramani; Aldo Tarlao; Luciano Marion (cox)		Switzerland; Alex Siebenhaar; Walter Lüchinger; Walter Ludin (cox)		Denmark; Frederik Mönster; Knud Bröchner-Nielsen; Reimer Pagh (cox)	
M4-	Belgium; Charles Van Antwerpen; Jos Rosa; Harry Elzendoorn; Florent Caers		Denmark; Eivin Kristensen; Carl Nielsen; Harry Nielsen; Paul Locht		France; Pierre Blondiaux; Jean-Jacques Guissart; Gérald Maquat; Jean-Pierre Souche	
M4+	Italy; Reginaldo Polloni; Francesco Gotti; Angelo Ghidini; Guido Cristinelli; Domenico Cambieri (cox)		Switzerland; Rico Bianchi; Karl Weidmann; Émile Ess; Heini Scheller; Walter Ludin (cox)		Spain; Miguel Palau; Salvador Costa; Joaquin Cortada Perez; Pedro Massana; Luis Omedes (cox)	
M8+	Great Britain; David Jennens; James Crowden; William Windham; J. R. Dingle; John Jones; Nicholas Clack; David Macklin; Harry Almond; John Hinde (cox)		Denmark; Per Lauridsen; Aksel Möller Schiolts; Mogens Snogdahl; Björn Brönnum; Leif Hermansen; Ole Scavenius Jensen; Helge Muxoll Schrøder; Jørn Snogdahl; John Vilhelmsen (cox)		Netherlands; G. Ockeloen; H. A. Roell; R. J. Sielcken; H. E. ten Broeke; Jan op den Velde; J. L. Klei; Cate A. ten Bruggen; H. Marcus; P. F. W. Dekker (cox)	
