= Karlo Pavlenč =

Croatian rower

Personal information
- Nationality: Croatian
- Born: 9 January 1926; Zagreb, Yugoslavia
- Died: 11 August 1987 (aged 61); Zagreb, Yugoslavia

Sport
- Sport: Rowing

Karlo Pavlenč (9 January 1926 – 11 August 1987) was a Croatian rower. He competed at the 1948 Summer Olympics and the 1952 Summer Olympics.
