= China at the 1952 Summer Olympics =

- IOC code: CHN (PRC used at these Games)
- NOC: Chinese Olympic Committee

in Helsinki
- Competitors: 1 in 1 sport
- Flag bearer: Zhang Banglun (Note: Didn't make the opening ceremony but was present during the flag raising ceremony)
- Medals: Gold 0 Silver 0 Bronze 0 Total 0

Summer Olympics appearances (overview)
- 1952; 1956–1980; 1984; 1988; 1992; 1996; 2000; 2004; 2008; 2012; 2016; 2020; 2024; 2028

Other related appearances
- Republic of China (1924–1948)

The People's Republic of China (PRC) sent a delegation to the Olympic Games for the first time at the 1952 Summer Olympics in Helsinki, Finland.

Prior to the foundation of the PRC in 1949, athletes from mainland China competed for the Republic of China (ROC) at the Olympic Games from its debut in 1924 to 1948. After the Chinese Civil War, 19 of the 25 members of the Chinese Olympic Committee (COC) withdrew to the island of Taiwan in 1951, and the COC was reorganized in Beijing.

Both Committees wrote to the International Olympic Committee (IOC) requesting that they participate in the upcoming Games in Helsinki. The IOC passed a motion that:

...authorizes the athletes of both countries, in agreement with the Organizing Committee of the Helsinki Games, to take part in the events of the present Olympiad...

— François Piétri, IOC member from France

Just one day prior to the opening of the Games, the COC received the invitation from the Organizing Committee. Despite the lack of jet air transportation to fly the team from Beijing to Helsinki in time for the Opening Ceremonies, the COC decided to send its delegation anyway. The Chinese athletes arrived at the athlete's village on July 29 and raised the flag of the People's Republic of China for the first time in Olympic history.

The Chinese delegation (including athletes and officials) consisted of 38 men and 2 women, including the men's football team, the men's basketball team, and the lone swimmer Wu Chuanyu. Only Wu Chuanyu arrived in time to take part in the official competition, while the football team played two friendly matches. The Chinese stayed 10 days in Helsinki and participated in the closing ceremony.

The Republic of China's team withdrew from the Games on July 17 in response to the IOC's decision to allow both PRC and ROC athletes to compete. This marked the beginning of the "two Chinas" conflict in the Olympics, which resulted in the PRC Olympic Committee's withdrawal from the IOC in August 1958. The issue was resolved in November 1979, and the People's Republic of China participated in the 1980 Winter Olympics—their first appearance since the 1952 Games.

== Swimming ==
China had one entry in the swimming competition.

Name	Event	Heat		Semifinal		Final	
Name	Event	Time	Rank	Time	Rank	Time	Rank
Wu Chuanyu	100 m backstroke	1:12.3	28	did not advance			
