= 1952 Summer Olympics =

Multi-sport event in Helsinki, Finland

Games of the XV Olympiad
- Emblem of the 1952 Summer Olympics
- Location: Helsinki, Finland
- Nations: 69
- Athletes: 4,932 (4,411 men, 521 women)
- Events: 149 in 17 sports (23 disciplines)
- Opening: 19 July 1952; 74 years ago
- Closing: 3 August 1952
- Opened by: President Juho Kusti Paasikivi
- Cauldron: Hannes Kolehmainen; Paavo Nurmi
- Stadium: Helsinki Olympic Stadium

The 1952 Summer Olympics (Finnish: Kesäolympialaiset 1952, Swedish: Olympiska sommarspelen 1952), officially known as the Games of the XV Olympiad (Finnish: XV olympiadin kisat, Swedish: Spel i XV Olympiaden) and commonly known as Helsinki 1952, were an international multi-sport event held from 19 July to 3 August 1952 in Helsinki, Finland.

After Japan declared in 1938 that it would be unable to host the 1940 Olympics in Tokyo due to the ongoing Second Sino-Japanese War, Helsinki had been selected to host the 1940 Summer Olympics, which were then cancelled due to World War II. Tokyo eventually hosted the games in 1964. Helsinki is the northernmost city at which a summer Olympic Games have been held. With London hosting the 1948 Olympics, 1952 is the most recent time when two consecutive summer Olympic Games were held entirely in Europe. The 1952 Summer Olympics was the last of the two consecutive Olympics to be held in Northern Europe, following the 1952 Winter Olympics in Oslo, Norway.

They were also the Olympic Games at which the most world records were broken until they were surpassed by the 2008 Summer Games in Beijing. The Bahamas, Guatemala, Hong Kong, Indonesia, Israel, Netherlands Antilles, Nigeria, the People's Republic of China, Saarland, the Soviet Union, Thailand, and Vietnam made their Olympic debuts at the 1952 Games. The United States won the most gold and overall medals at these Olympics.

Olympic Stadium Tower photographed in 1952 (built in 1938)

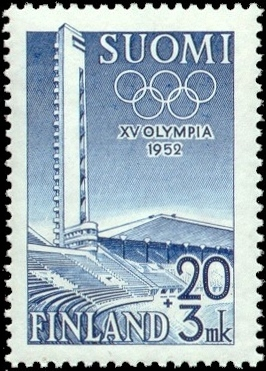
Finnish postage stamp featuring the Helsinki Olympic Stadium issued in 1951 (Note: In 1952, the word Olympiad was still relatively foreign to Finland, as evidenced by its full assimilation to the word olympia in the logo and stamps of the Games. The poster for the Games, on the other hand, erroneously features the XVth Olympic Games, the "XV Olympic Games", even though they were the XV "Olympics", but only the 12th (XII) Summer Olympics. In addition, the English version had a suffix indicating order, although Roman numerals already express order as such.)

== Background and preparation of the Games ==
=== Host city selection ===
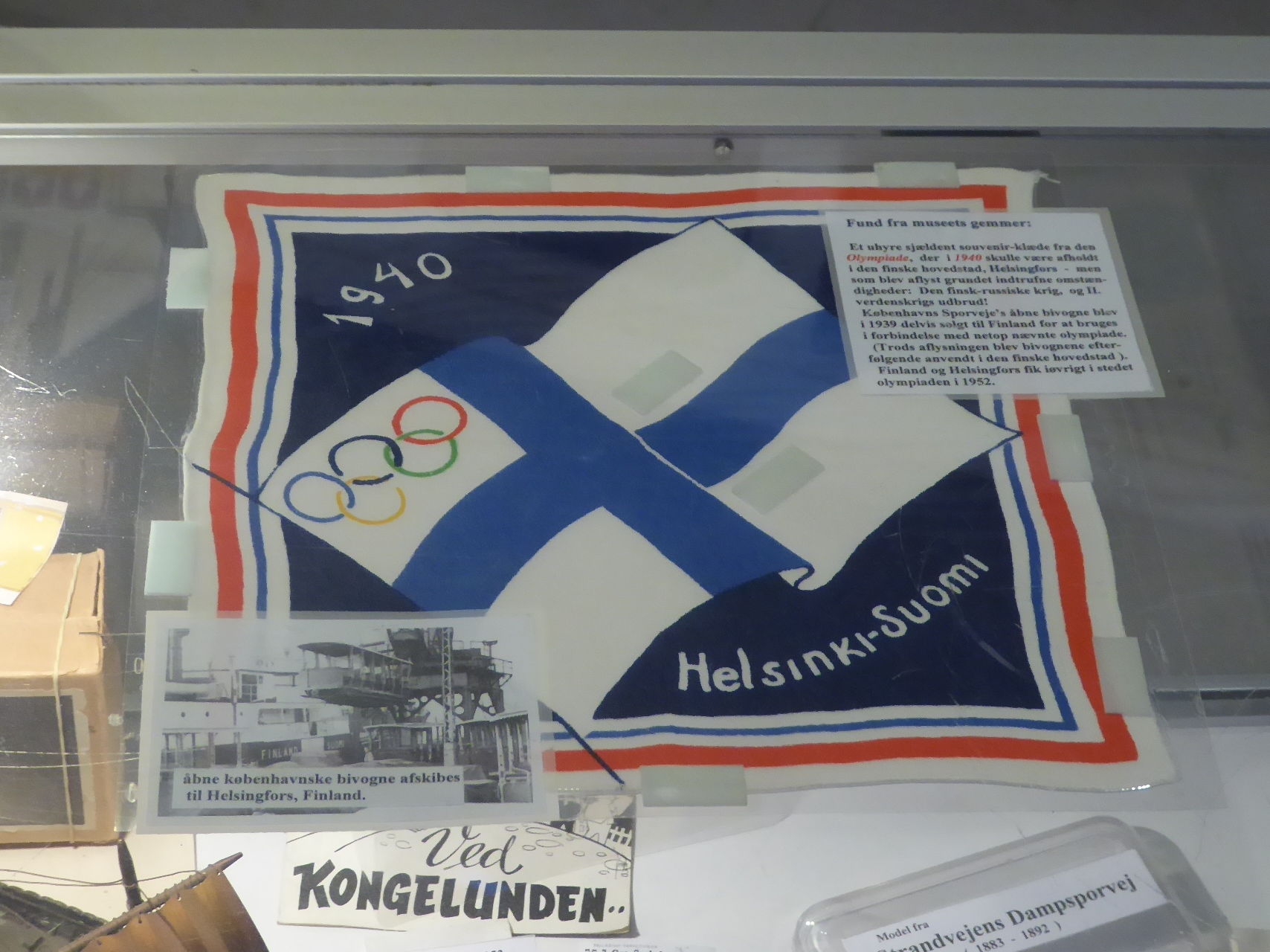
A rare souvenir cloth of the cancelled 1940 Summer Olympics in Helsinki at Sporvejsmuseet Skjoldenæsholm in Denmark. The small picture shows some of the Copenhagen tram trailers which was exported to Helsinki due to the Olympics before it was cancelled

Inspired by the success of the Swedish 1912 Olympics, Finnish sports fans began to arouse the idea of their own Olympic Games: for example, Erik von Frenckell publicly presented his dreams of the Finnish Olympic Games at the opening of the 1915 Töölön Pallokenttä.

As the Olympic success continued in the 1920s, enthusiasm for one's own Olympics grew, and after the 1920 Antwerp Olympics, Finnish sports leaders began planning to build a stadium in Helsinki in 1920. Finland's main sports organizations and the City of Helsinki founded the Stadion Foundation in 1927 to get the stadium to Helsinki. In the same year, Ernst Edvard Krogius, who represented Finland on the International Olympic Committee (IOC), announced Finland's willingness to host the competition.

In 1930, preparations for the 1936 Games, which was accelerated by the launch of a design project for the Olympic Stadium. However, Helsinki was not a candidate in the first round in 1931, and Berlin won the competition, but Helsinki immediately registered as a candidate for the 1940 Games. Those games were awarded to Tokyo in 1936, and two years later with the outbreak of the Sino-Japanese War Japan announced they were giving up the 1940 games, and four days later the IOC offered the Games to Helsinki, which agreed to take over, although there was little time left to prepare for the Games.

World War II broke out on 1 September 1939, with the German–Soviet invasion of Poland, which also drew Britain and France to war. Despite the aggression, the Organizing Committee of the Olympic Games continued to be optimistic about the preparations for the Games. However, the Soviet invasion of Finland on 30 November 1939, halted planning for the games. After the Winter War, the Organizing Committee decided to abandon the Games on 20 March 1940 due to the hostilities across Europe, the suspension of preparations caused by the Winter War, and the deplorable economic situation. At the meeting of the Finnish Olympic Committee on 20 April 1940, the Olympic Games in Finland were officially canceled. In the meantime, World War II had already expanded, with Germany occupying Denmark and fighting in Norway. Instead of the Olympic Games, Finland held a Memorial Competitions for Fallen Athletes who died in the Winter War against the Soviet Union, at the opening of which actor Eino Kaipainen recited the poem Silent Winners written by Yrjö Jylhä. The memorial competitions were held on the initiative of the sports journalist Sulo Kolkka.

At the end of World War II, London was awarded the 1948 Summer Olympics after the city was originally granted the 1944 Games, which were canceled due to the war. Helsinki continued its attempt to have the Games organized and registered as candidates for the 1952 Games. At the IOC Congress in Stockholm on 21 June 1947, Helsinki was chosen as the host city, leaving behind the bids of Amsterdam, Los Angeles, Minneapolis, Detroit, Chicago and Philadelphia. Helsinki's strengths included the fairly completed venues built for the 1940 Games.

=== Bidding results ===
1952 Summer Olympics bidding results
City	Country	Round	
City	Country	1	2
Helsinki	Finland	14	15
Minneapolis	United States	4	5
Los Angeles	United States	4	5
Amsterdam	Netherlands	3	3
Detroit	United States	2	—
Chicago	United States	1	—
Philadelphia	United States	0	—

=== Organizing Committee ===
After confirmation that Helsinki would host the Games, the "XV Olympia Helsinki 1952" was established as the organizing committee of the Games on 8 September 1947. Its members were the Finnish Olympic Committee, the Finnish State, the City of Helsinki and 26 various sports organizations. The mayor of Helsinki Erik von Frenckell was elected chairman of the committee, who at the time also chaired Finnish Football Association. Akseli Kaskela, Olavi Suvanto and Armas-Eino Martola were elected Vice-Chairs. Among them, Kaskela and Suvanto were elected on political grounds as representatives of the bourgeois Finnish Sports Federation (SVUL) and the leftist Finnish Workers' Sports Federation (TUL), Martola, on the other hand, got a former officer to lead the organization of the practical arrangements.

Other members of the Organizing Committee were Yrjö Enne, Väinö A. M. Karikoski, Urho Kekkonen, Ernst Krogius, William Lehtinen, Aarne K. Leskinen, Eino Pekkala, Väinö Salovaara and Erik Åström. In 1948–1949, Karikoski, Kekkonen, Krogius and Lehtinen resigned from the committee, and Lauri Miettinen, Arno Tuurna and Yrjö Valkama were elected to replace them. In the spring of 1952, Ente was replaced by Arvi E. Heiskanen and as completely new members by Mauno Pekkala and Aaro Tynell.

Erik von Frenckell was the chairman of the organizing committee and the other members were Armas-Eino Martola (competition director), Yrjö Valkama (sports director), Olavi Suvanto (maintenance director), Akseli Kaskela, Aarne K. Leskinen and Niilo Koskinen. In addition, the head of the central office Kallio Kotkas and the head of information Eero Petäjäniemi were involved in the competition organization.

=== Political situation ===
The international political atmosphere was tense when the Helsinki Olympics were held. When the IOC held its meeting in Vienna in 1951, many difficult topics were on the agenda. The Cold War was under way, and the situation between Israel and Arab countries, divided Germany had to be addressed as a team, and the Chinese Civil War, with the Chinese Communist Party winning, forming the People's Republic of China and the Republic of China government exiled to Taiwan.

Four years earlier, Japan was not invited to the London Olympics from the losing states of the Second World War. The Olympic Committee of Israel had not yet been recognized, and a successor to the German Olympic Committee, which had been dissolved during World War II, had not yet been established, but all these countries already participated in the Helsinki Games, as did Saarland.

The Cold War affected the participation of both the United States and the Soviet Union in the Games. The participation of the United States in the Games was decided only after the country had received an assessment of the political situation in Finland from its embassy in Helsinki. The Soviet Union was accepted as a member of the IOC in May 1951, and in December of the same year the country accepted the invitation to the competition, as the country's athletes were in medal condition. Although the Soviet leadership had previously considered the Games a bourgeois event, the Helsinki Games held propaganda value. In the Soviet Union, billions of rubles were spent on coaching athletes in just one year. The Soviet Union planned to fly its athletes every day between Leningrad and Helsinki. Another option was for Soviet athletes to stay in the Soviet Porkkalanniemi garrison. However, Finland required that all competitors stay in the Olympic village. As a compromise solution for the Eastern Bloc athletes, a second Olympic village was established in Espoo, Otaniemi as Soviet leaders wanted them to avoid contact with Western athletes. Joseph Stalin allowed Soviet athletes to enter the 1952 Summer Olympics because he was sure that they would win the most medals. However, American athletes secured more gold and total medals and Stalin afforded more resources for the advancement of elite athletes in the Soviet Union in the build-up to the 1956 Summer Olympics.

The 1952 Games were also threatened with cancellation due to the deteriorating world situation. The Korean War had begun in 1950, which also caused concern in the organizing committee. At Von Frenckell's suggestion, the organizing committee decided to take out Lloyd's of London war insurance.

=== Construction work ===
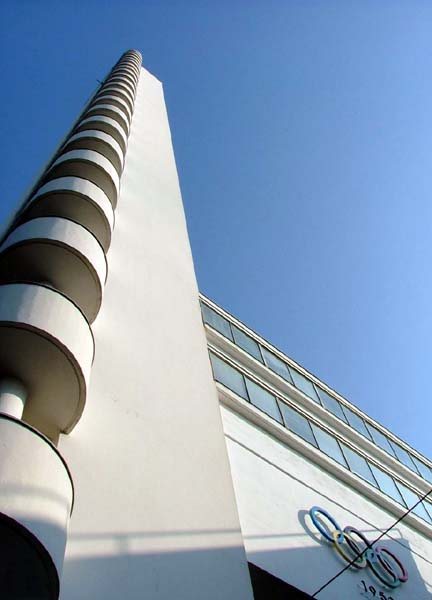
Olympic Stadium Tower

Most of the venues for the competitions were completed prior to the 1940s in anticipation of successful bid attempts, but some expansion and refurbishment work was needed, including the construction of additional stands at the Olympic and Swimming Stadium. A residential area, Kisakylä (Olympic Village) was built south of Käpylä's Koskelantie to accommodate competitors. The area, which was built close to the 1940 Olympics, was already the residence of the people of Helsinki at that time. Just below the opening, the competition area was completed for the use of visitors Kumpula Outdoor Swimming Pool. Female athletes got their own race village from the Nursing College in Meilahti. The athletes of the Soviet-led Eastern Bloc stayed in the Teekkarikylä in Otaniemi. The Finnish team lived on the premises of the Santahamina Army School (later the Cadet School, now the National Defence University).

The City of Helsinki prepared for the Olympics by building a new airport in Seutula (now Helsinki-Vantaan lentoasema), 11-story Hotelli Palace, and the Olympic Pier in South Harbor. A large electric scoreboard was procured. It attracted international attention because it represented the top of its time in the scoreboard field both in terms of its system and its technology. OMEGA debuted the OMEGA Time Recorder in Helsinki. This all-new quartz clock not only timed the events but also printed out the results. This breakthrough technology allowed official Olympic times to be accurate to 1/100 of a second. As a result, the company received the prestigious Croix du Mérite Olympique award for their efforts. In 1950 cable television was tried for the first time in Finland, in the 1952 Olympics people could watch TV sending from the stadium through coaxial cable to Stockmann department store window.

Helsinki paved tens of kilometers of roads, and a myriad of houses were painted. The city's first traffic lights were installed at the intersection of Aleksanterinkatu and Mikonkatu in October 1951. The Palace Hotel and Vaakuna Hotel among others, were completed for the needs of the guests. However, due to the relatively low number of hotels in the city, tent villages were built for tourists in Lauttasaari and Seurasaari, among others. However, the preparations for accommodation turned out to be considerably oversized; at its best, the occupancy rate of the 6,000-seat tent village in Lauttasaari had an occupancy of only 8 per cent. With the support of the Olympia 1952 committee, Finland's first mini golf courses were completed to entertain guests.

=== Anthem ===
The International Olympic Committee had declared in 1950 that it did not have an official Olympic anthem, but that the organizers could decide their own anthems. An anthem competition was held in Finland. In the spring of 1951, a poetry competition was announced, which was surprisingly won by an unknown teacher candidate, Niilo Partanen. Second and third came the well-known poets Toivo Lyy and Heikki Asunta. These winning poems were allowed to be used in the composition competition. The selection of the 51 compositions by a jury chaired by Jouko Tolonen was also a surprise. When the winner was announced on 17 March 1952, an unknown teacher Jaakko Linjama was revealed behind the nickname, who had used Lyy's lyrics in his Olympic Hymn.

The nicknames of the other contestants were not opened. This caused a stir, and Arijoutsi, among others, doubted that the victory of the unknown would go to the honor of well-known composers. There were well-known members in the competition. The voters had identified the composing style of Uuno Klami and Aarre Merikanto, among others. The only Finnish composer who congratulated Linjamaa was Jean Sibelius, who did not take part in the anthem.

== Torch relay ==
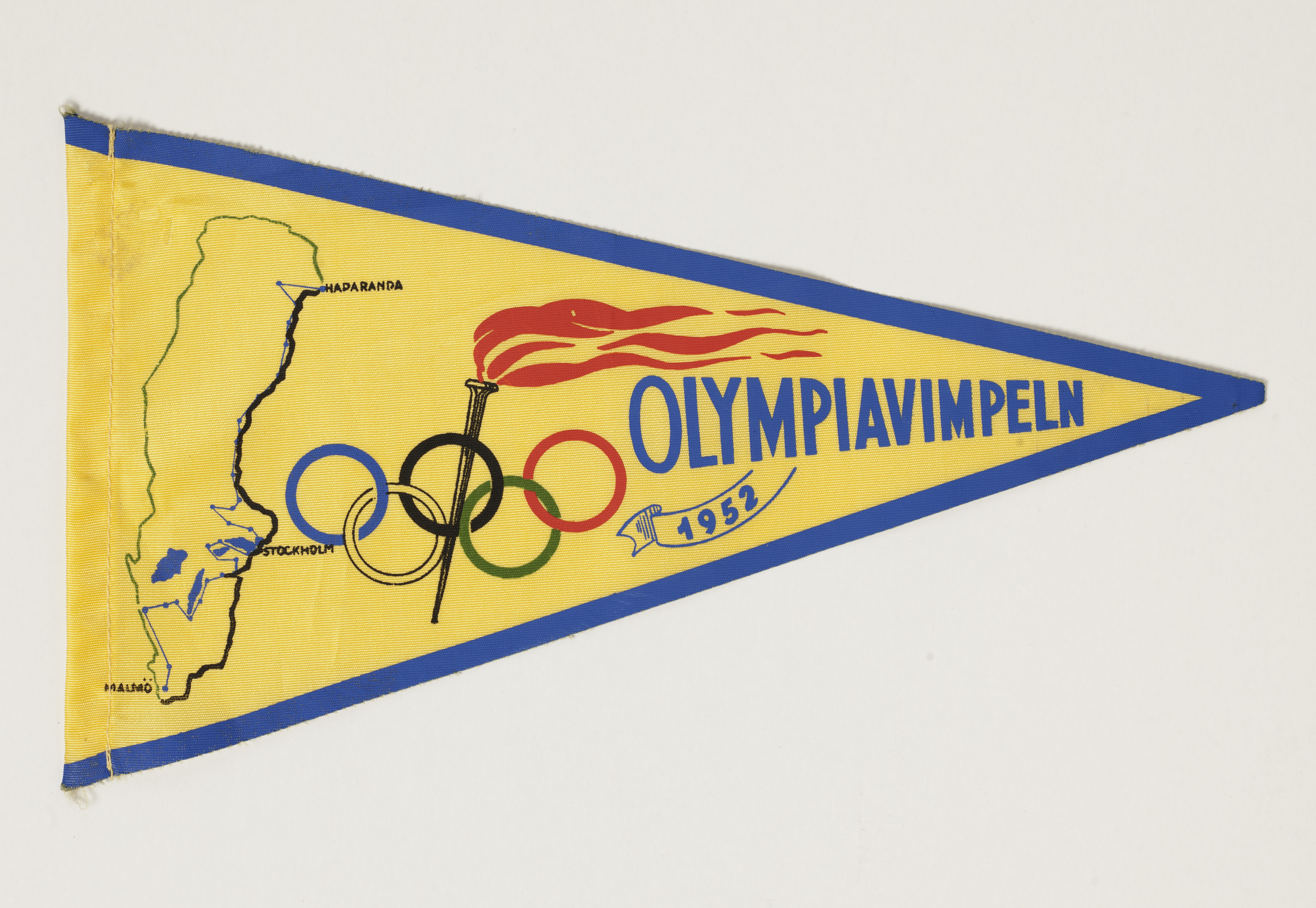
Olympic torch banner, showing the torch's journey through Sweden

The Olympic torch was transported by land from Olympia to Athens from where fire's journey continued in a miner's lamp donated by the Saar Olympic Committee on a SAS plane to Aalborg, Denmark. The glass cover surrounding the lamp was designed by the artist Sakari Tohka. The Olympic torch itself was designed by the artist Aukusti Tuhka.

From Denmark, the torchlight continued by running, cycling, riding, rowing and paddling to Copenhagen, from where the fire was transported by ferry to Sweden to Malmö. The journey of the torch across Sweden was carried to Haparanda by 700 messengers, from where it continued to the Finnish side in Tornio. On the Finnish-Swedish border bridge, the torch was received by Ville Pörhölä, who brought it to Tornio sports ground. The Olympic torch from Tornio, Greece, was connected to Pallastunturi on 6 July 1952 where it ignited the "midnight sun fire". In reality, the Pallastunturi fire was lit with liquefied petroleum gas, because the night in July was cloudy at that time and it was not possible to use the sun as a lighter. From Tornio, the torch traveled through Finland to Helsinki. It was transported by more than 1,200 people.

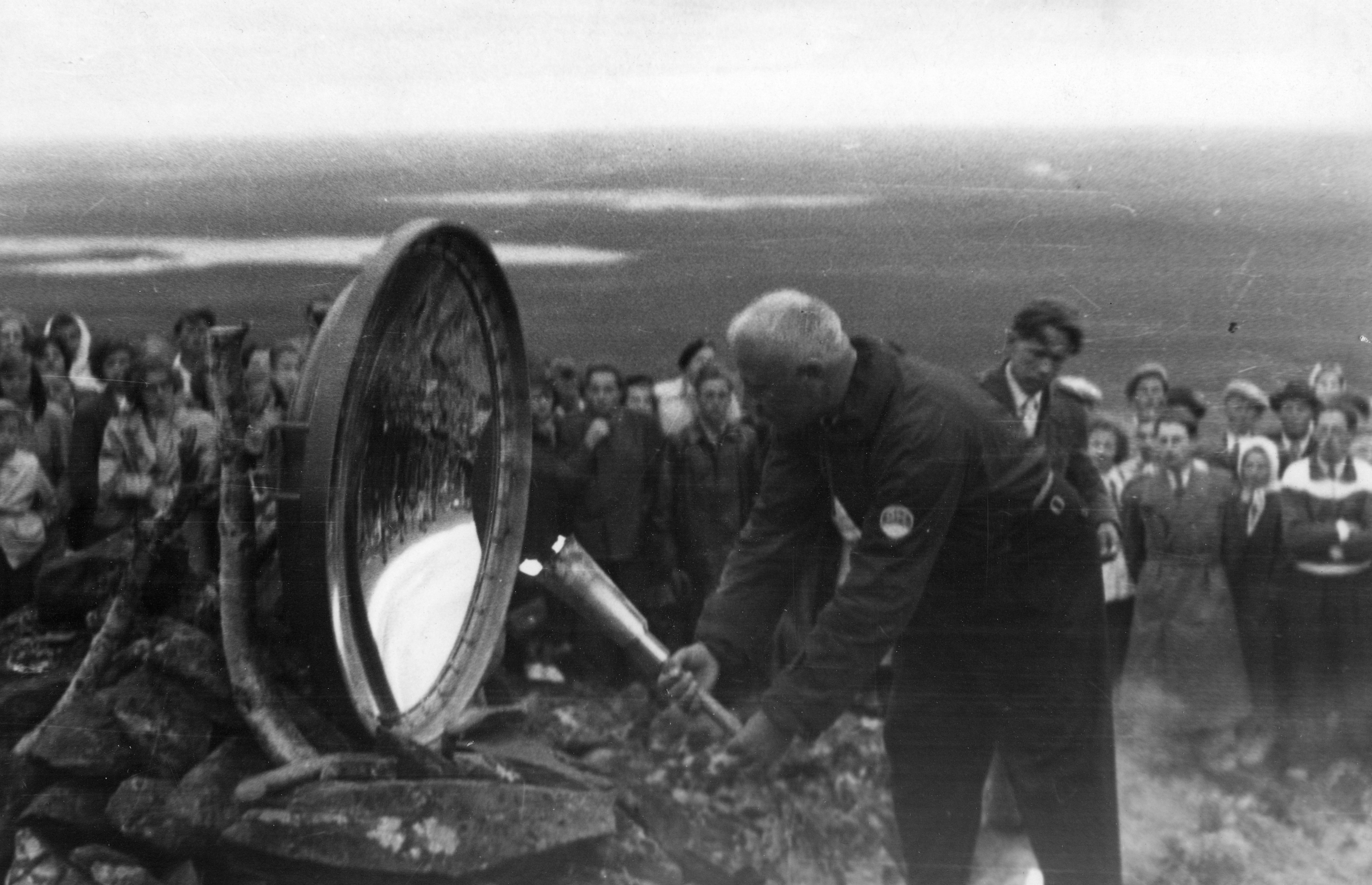
Forest Counselor Jarl Sundqvist tries to light an Olympic torch with a mirror from the midnight sun on Pallastunturi on 6 July 1952.

Initially, the aim was to transport fire to Helsinki via the Soviet Union, but the matter was not settled through diplomacy by the deadline. The journey covered a total of 7,870 kilometres on the journey that began on 25 June and ended on 19 July 1952. The actual Olympic flame was lit for the Olympic Stadium.

Olympic torch relay:

- Greece: Olympia – Corinth – Athens
- Denmark: Aalborg – Århus – Vejle – Odense – Sorø – Copenhagen
- Sweden: Malmö – Helsingborg – Laholm – Gothenburg – Jönköping – Norrköping – Örebro – Stockholm – Uppsala – Falun – Gävle – Hudiksvall – Sundsvall – Umeå – Skellefteå – Boden – Haparanda
- Finland: (midnight sun fire): Pallastunturi – Rovaniemi – Tornio – Oulu – Kokkola – Jyväskylä – Tampere – Helsinki

== Opening ceremony ==
Helsinki Olympic Stadium

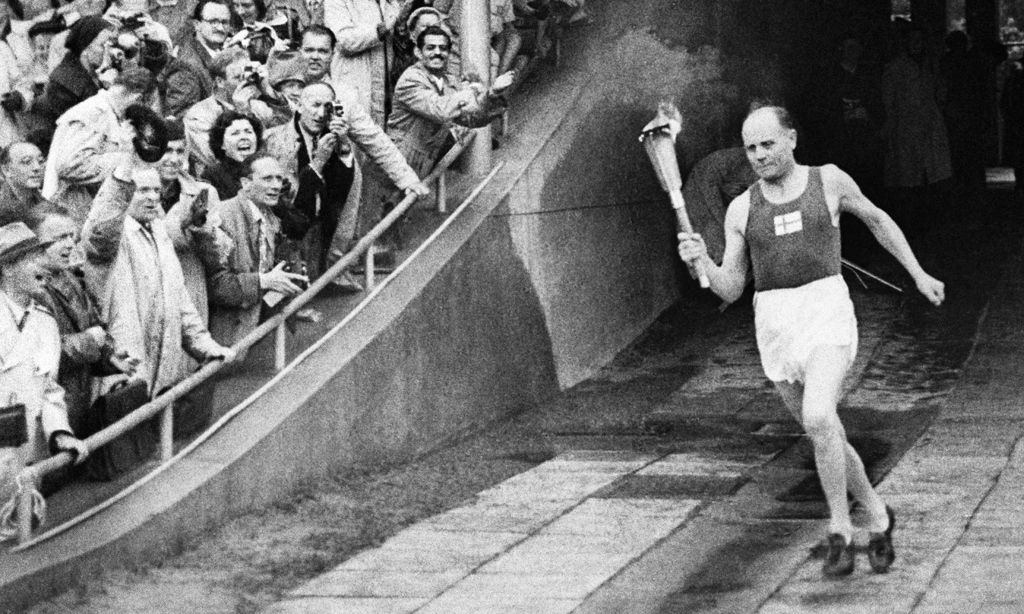
Paavo Nurmi enters the Olympic Stadium

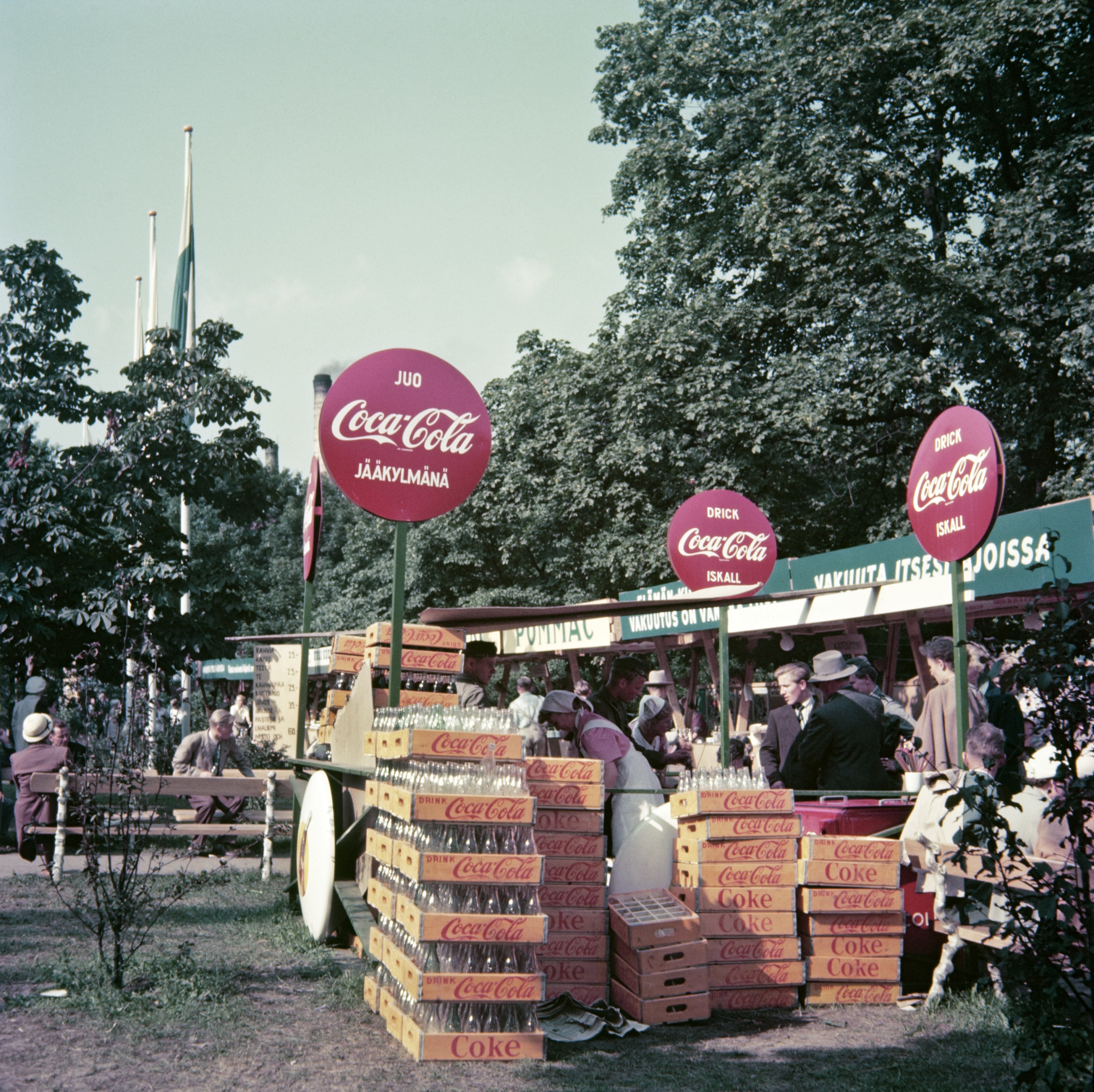
The selling point of the official competition drink of the Olympic Games

The opening ceremony of the Helsinki Olympics was held on 19 July. Although the weather was rainy and chilly and the Olympic Stadium had no roof but on top of the main auditorium, the stadium was full with 70,435 spectators. The inaugural march had a record 5,469 people from 67 countries. After the march, the countries organized themselves into the central lawn, and the chairman of the organizing committee, Erik von Frenckell, spoke in Finnish, Swedish, French and English.

President of the Republic J. K. Paasikivi gave the opening speech, which was the shortest in Olympic history and contained a mistake: it was not the "Fifteenth Olympic Games", but the XV Olympic Games and the 12th World Olympics, due to the 1916, 1940 and 1944 races had been canceled. The speech was followed by the raising of the Olympic flag and the Olympic fanfare composed by Aarre Merikanto. The President's speech was as follows:

It gives me great pleasure to address a message of greeting to the young people of the world as they prepare for the fifteenth Olympic Games which are, once again, to be celebrated in a spirit worthy of the ideals of Baron de Coubertin.

This happy cooperation between young people of all countries will serve the great call of concord and peace among the nations of the world.

I am particularly pleased to be sending you this advance greeting because, as a young man, I was myself an enthusiastic gymnast and athlete. And I have retained throughout my life a deep interest in athletics and sports of all kinds.

I am convinced that the Finnish people, loving sport as they do, will spare no effort to make the 1952 Olympic Games a complete success.

The Olympic flame was lit by running heroes Paavo Nurmi (to the stadium) and Hannes Kolehmainen (to the stadium tower). When Paavo Nurmi was announced to arrive at the stadium, athletes from the participating countries deviated from the formation to see the legend better. Only the lines of the Soviet Union and Finland remained in the line.

After the Olympic flame was lit, the Archbishop Ilmari Salomies was due to say a prayer, but German Barbara Rotbraut-Pleyer, nicknamed "White Angel of the Games", had jumped from the auditorium onto the track and ran straight to the speaker's seat. Organizers quickly removed Pleyer, who had time to say just a few words into the microphone. Pleyer's purpose was to proclaim a message of peace. Heikki Savolainen, a gymnast who was competing in his fifth consecutive Olympic games, swore the Olympic oath on behalf of the athletes.

== Highlights ==
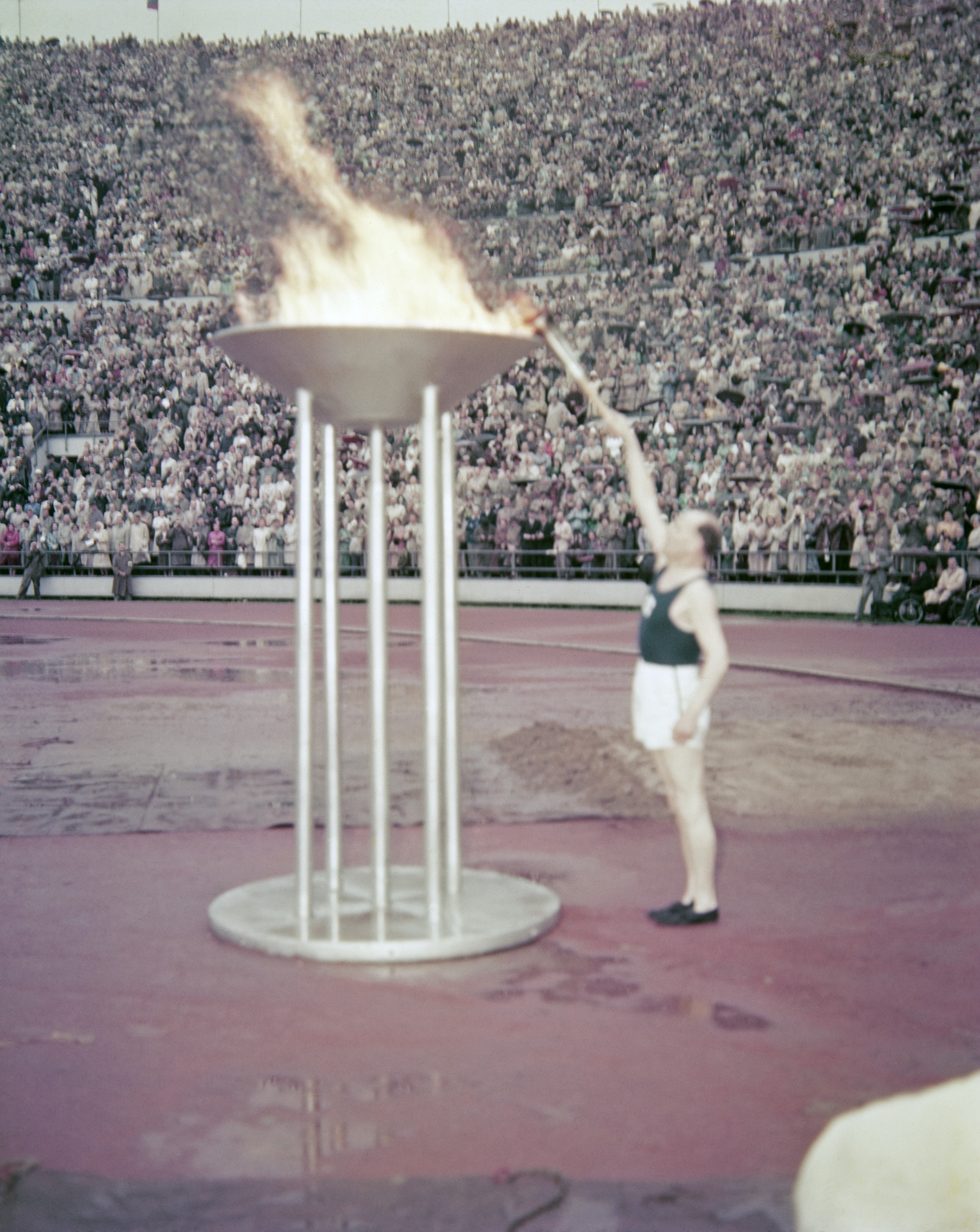
Paavo Nurmi lighting the Olympic flame.

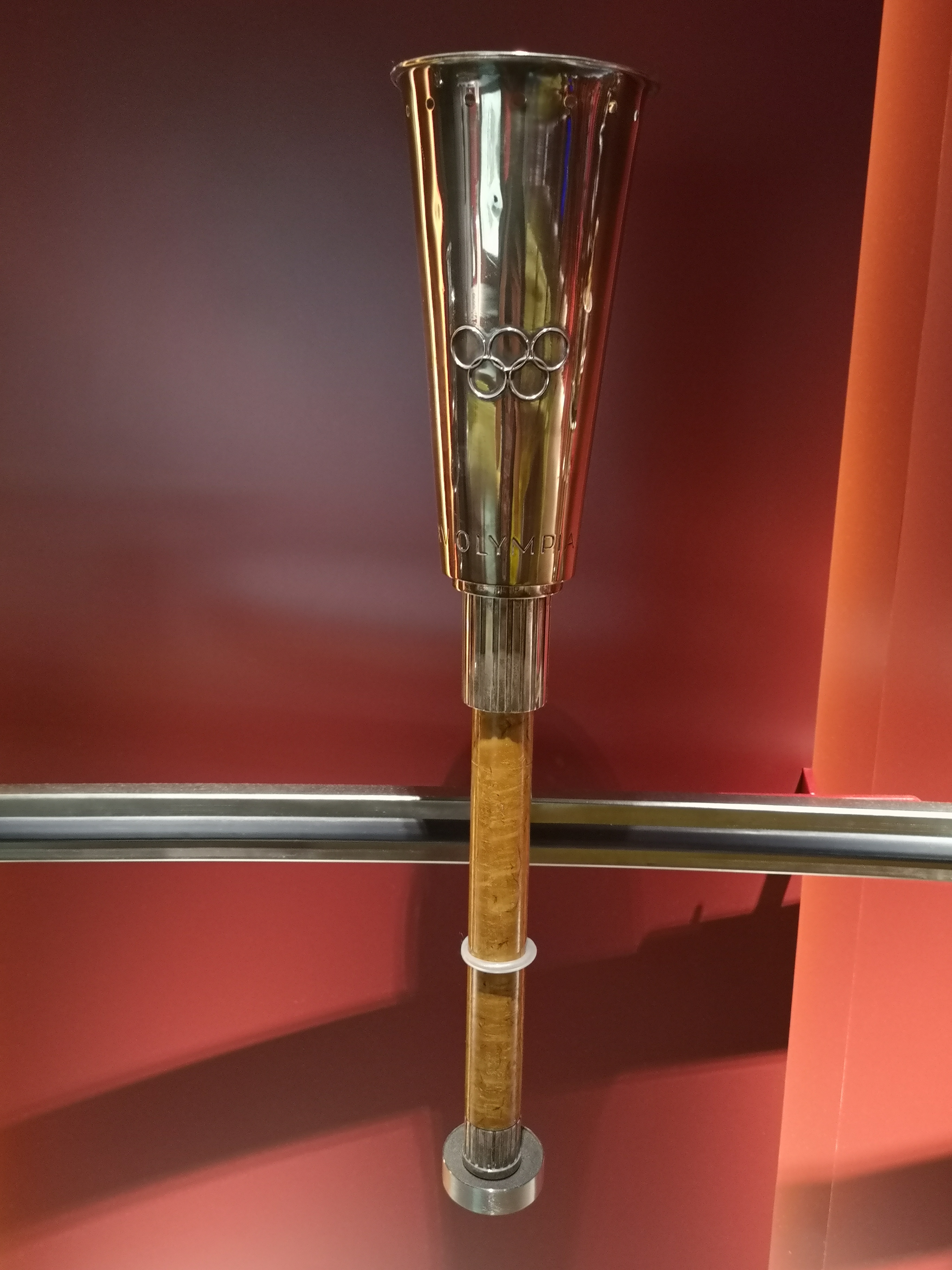
1952 Summer Olympics torch at the Olympic Museum in Lausanne

Closing ceremony

- These were the final Olympic Games organised under the IOC presidency of Sigfrid Edström.
- Israel made its Olympic debut. The Jewish state had been unable to participate in the 1948 Games because of its 1947–1949 Palestine war. A previous Palestine Mandate team had boycotted the 1936 Games in protest of the Nazi regime.
- Indonesia made its Olympic debut with three athletes.
- The newly established People's Republic of China (PRC) participated in the Olympics for the first time, although only one swimmer (Wu Chuanyu) of its 40-member delegation arrived in time to take part in the official competition. The PRC would not return to the Summer Olympics until Los Angeles 1984.
- The Republic of China (Taiwan) withdrew from the Games on July 20, in protest of the IOC decision to allow athletes from the People's Republic of China to compete.
- The Soviet Union participated for the first time. Soviet Olympic team was notorious for skirting the edge of amateur rules. All Soviet athletes held some nominal jobs, but were in fact state-sponsored and trained full-time. According to many experts, that gave the Soviet Union a huge advantage over the United States and other Western countries, whose athletes were students or real amateurs. Indeed, the Soviet Union monopolized the top place in the medal standings after 1968, and, until its collapse, placed second only once, in the 1984 Winter games, after another Eastern bloc nation, the GDR. Amateur rules were relaxed only in the late 1980s and were almost completely abolished in the 1990s, after the fall of the USSR.
- The Soviets turned the athletic competition into a metaphor for political propaganda: "Every record won by our sportsmen, every victory in international contests, graphically demonstrates to the whole world the advantages and strength of the Soviet system."(Sovetsky Sport) Additionally, the Soviet state media falsely claimed victory at these Games, despite the Soviet Union finishing second to the United States both in terms of gold and total medals.
- The Olympic Flame was lit by two Finnish heroes, runners Paavo Nurmi and Hannes Kolehmainen. Nurmi first lit the cauldron inside the stadium, and later the flame was relayed to the stadium tower where Kolehmainen lit it. Only the flame in the tower was burning throughout the Olympics. (See: 1952 Summer Olympics torch relay.)
- Germany and Japan were invited after being barred in 1948. Following the post-war occupation and partition, three German states had been established. Teams from the Federal Republic of Germany and the Saarland (which joined the FRG after 1955) participated; the German Democratic Republic (East Germany) was absent. Though they won 24 medals, the fifth-highest total at the Games, German competitors failed to win a gold medal for the only time.
- Eva Perón, the celebrated First Lady of Argentina, died of cancer in July 1952 while the Olympics were taking place, so a memorial was held at the Games for the Argentine team.

== Sports events ==
There were 4,925 athletes from 69 countries, with the Soviet Union making its Olympic debut and Germany participating for the first time since World War II. A total of 149 events were held in 17 different sports.

The most-medalling athletes of the Games were Viktor Chukarin of the Soviet Union, who won four gymnastics Olympic gold medals, and Czechoslovakia's Emil Zátopek, who won three track golds. The United States won the most gold and total medals, with 40 and 76. The host country, Finland, had 6 gold, 3 silver and 13 bronze medals.

=== Shooting ===
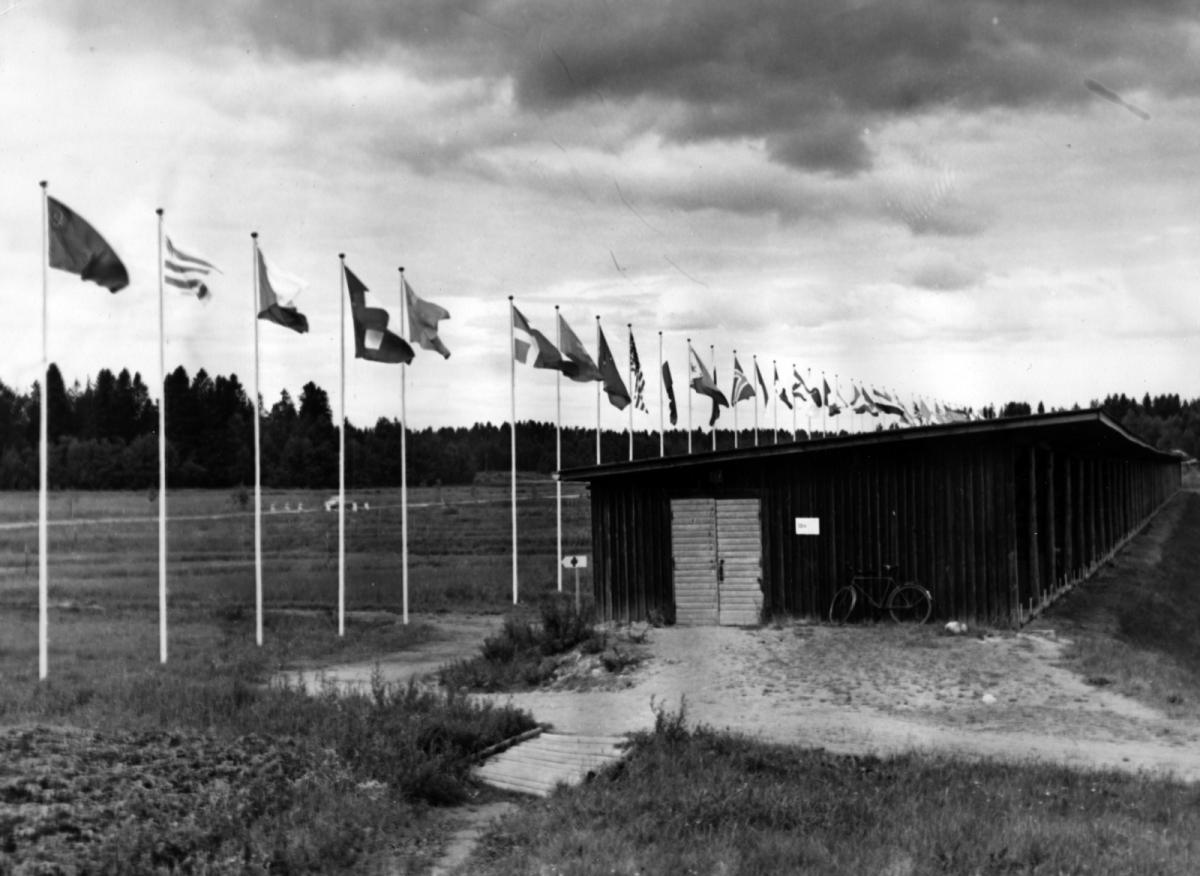
Malmi Shooting Range

Shooting was competed in seven events, six of which (rifle sports) were conducted at the Malmi Shooting Range in moderately difficult wind conditions. Tough results were still fired in Helsinki, as the top four deer shooting broke world records. World records for knee position were also broken in free and small rifles. Shotgun shooting took place at the Huopalahti shooting range.

Ten countries took medals from the shooting. Norway was the only country to win two gold medals, with the Soviet Union winning the most medals. Boris Andreyev was the only Soviet shooter to win two multiple medals. A Finnish winner was already celebrated in a miniature rifle when Vilho Ylönen had time to play on the radio Björneborgarnas marsch. However, in an hour-long countdown, the Norwegian Erling Asbjørn Kongshaug was declared the winner of the competition.

=== Football ===
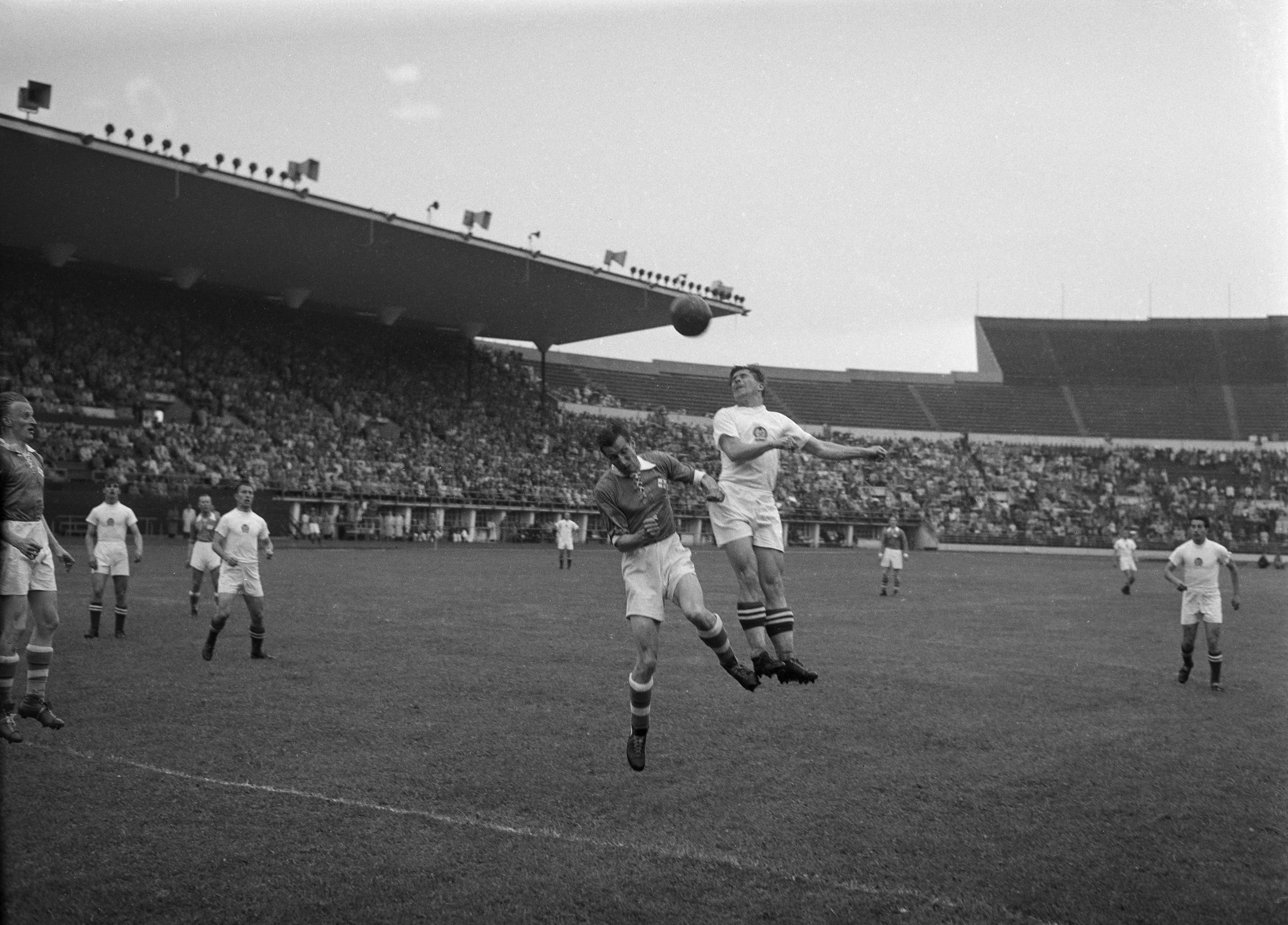
Football match between Hungary and Finland, Veikko Asikainen and Ferenc Puskas are in the forefront

The football tournament started even before the official opening, as the one-piece qualifiers took place on 15–16 July in Kotka, Lahti, Tampere, Turku and Helsinki. There were 27 countries registered for the tournament, but Saarland and Mexico dropped out before the Games.

Hungary Golden Team won the gold when it knocked down the Yugoslavia in the final with a score of 2–0. Sweden won a bronze medal. In the final, the Olympic Stadium had 58 553 paid spectators, the largest number of spectators in Finland watching a football match.

The first meeting between the Soviet Union and Yugoslavia in football is still amongst the most famous matches. On the political level, the Soviet leader Joseph Stalin and the Yugoslav leader Josip Tito split in 1948, which resulted in Yugoslavia being excluded from the Communist Information Bureau. The origin of the conflict was Tito's refusal to submit to Stalin's interpretations and visions of politics and in process becoming a Soviet satellite state. Before the match, both Tito and Stalin sent telegrams to their national teams, which showed just how important it was for the two head of states. Yugoslavia led 5–1, but a Soviet comeback in the last 15 minutes resulted in a 5–5 draw. The match was replayed, Yugoslavia winning 3–1. The defeat to the archrivals hit Soviet football hard, and after just three games played in the season, CSKA Moscow, who had made up most of the USSR squad, was forced to withdraw from the league by Joseph Stalin and later disbanded. Furthermore, Boris Arkadiev, who coached both USSR and CDKA, was stripped of his Merited Master of Sports of the USSR title.

=== Basketball ===
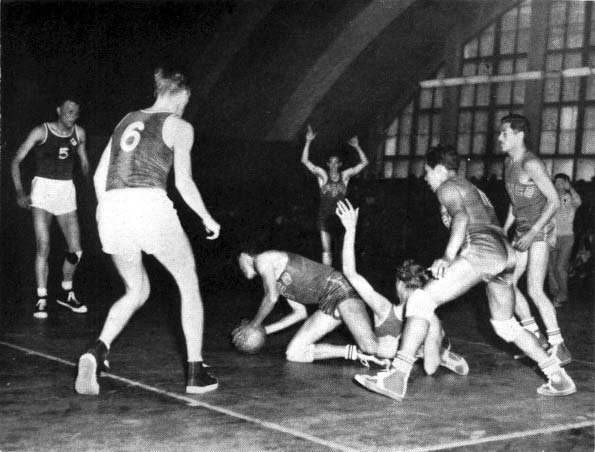
Finland and Mexico in the preliminary stage

23 teams entered basketball, ten of which made it directly to the actual tournament. The remaining 13 countries took the final six places in the Olympic tournament before the official opening of the Olympic Games.

In basketball, the gold medal was won by the United States, who defeated Soviet Union in the final 36–25. The final match was relatively slow-paced, as the Soviet Union tried to keep up with the United States by freezing the game. The United States had already clearly beat the Soviet Union 86–58 earlier in the tournament. The bronze was won by Uruguay, who also organized a mass battle after being dissatisfied with the referee's work.

=== Field hockey ===
Field hockey was included in the Helsinki Olympic Games in the range of sports on the condition that a maximum of 12 teams register for the Games. In the end, 16 teams applied for the competition, from which the International Field Hockey Federation selected 12 countries to participate in the competition venue. Eventually, four countries dropped out of the Games, so the remaining 12 teams that had applied for the competition were able to take part in the Olympic tournament.

The tournament started with two rounds before the Games opened, and the final match was held on 24 July. India and Netherlands met in the Velodrome final, with India winning its fifth consecutive gold under captaincy of Kunwar Digvijay Singh with a score of 6–1.

=== Canoeing ===
Canoeing competitions were held Taivallahti 27–28 July. There were a total of 159 participants in eight men's and women's only races, coming from 21 countries.

Canoeing was a celebration in Finland, as four of the nine sports went to the host country. In addition, the Finns took one silver and a bronze. The double gold medalists were Kurt Wires and Yrjö Hietanen who won the kayak duo's 1,000 and 10,000 meters. In the only women's sport, the 500-meter kayak unit, gold was taken by Sylvi Saimo, who was the first Finnish female gold medalist in the summer competitions. The second most successful country in kayaking was Sweden, which won one gold and three silver.

=== Fencing ===
Helsinki Olympics fencing competitions were held on the Espoo side of the Westend Tennis Hall. The men competed with Épée, sabre and foil in both personal competition and team competition. The women had only a personal competition for foil in the program. There were 250 men and 37 women from 32 countries.

Italy, Hungary and France were, as usual, the best fencing countries and took all the gold medals. A total of six countries reached medals. The Mangiarot brothers Edoardo and Dario took a double victory over the film. Hungarian swordsmen won a triple victory over the preserve.

=== Modern Pentathlon ===
The Modern pentathlon Olympic competitions was held at Ahvenisto Hämeenlinna. A total of 51 competitors from 19 countries entered the sport. For the first time in Olympic history, the sport also included a team competition.

Sweden, Hungary and Finland shared the medals. Sweden's Lars Hall won the individual competition, and Hungary was the best in the team competition. Before Hall, all Olympic winners of the sport have been officers. However, Hall was a carpenter by profession.

=== Boxing ===
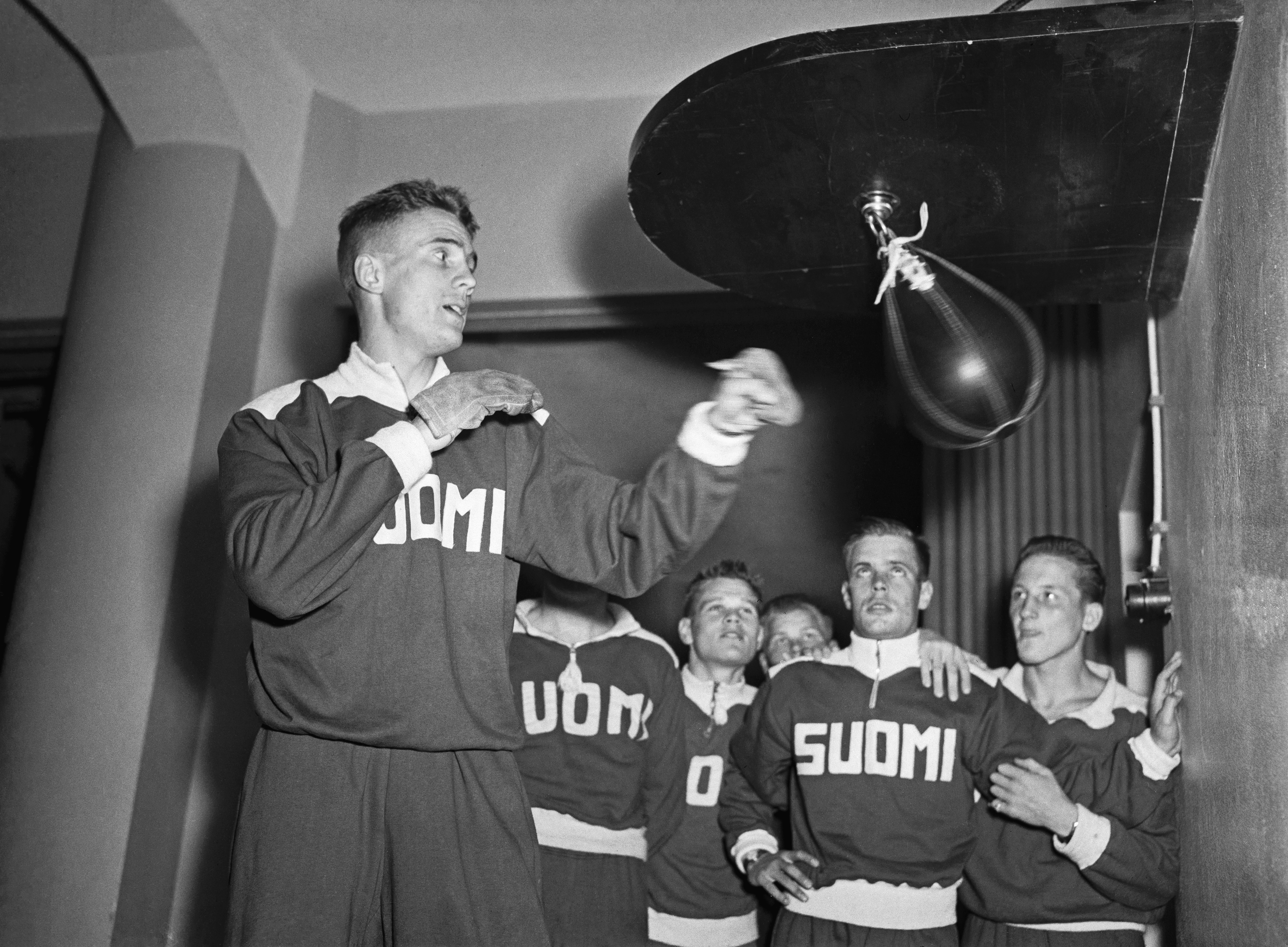
The Finnish boxers exercise. Pentti Niinivuori and Erkki Mallenius amongst others are watching while Börje Grönroos is boxing

Töölö Sports Hall held Olympic boxing between 28 July to 2 August in ten weight classes. There were a total of 240 participants. A total of 17 countries won medals. The most successful boxing country was the United States, which won five gold. The Soviet Union won the most medals, but its boxers did not win a single championship. Finnish boxers reached five medals. In the middle series, the American Floyd Patterson knocked out Romanian Vasile Tiță in a record-breaking 42 seconds. The American Norvel Lee, who won the heavyweight series, was awarded as the most technical boxer in the Games. In the heavyweight series Ed Sanders got gold when the Swedish Ingemar Johansson was rejected for his passivity. Johansson did not receive his silver medal until 1982.

=== Wrestling ===
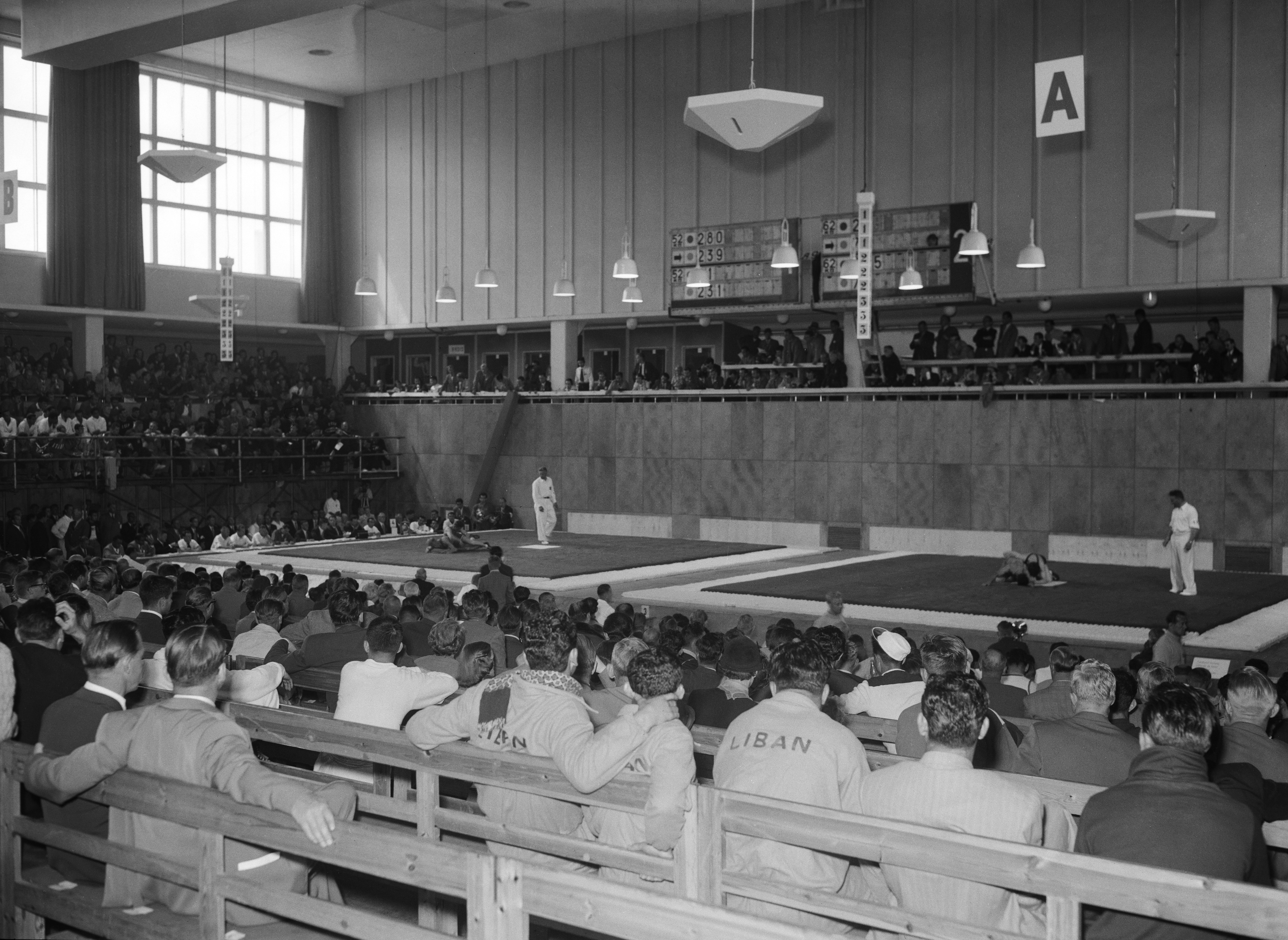
Wrestling in Helsinki

Wrestling was held in Helsinki in eight weight classes in both Greco-Roman wrestling and freestyle wrestling. All finals were held in the larger Exhibition Hall I, but freestyle wrestling events were held in the smaller Exhibition Hall II. Free button competitions were held on 20–23 July, and Greco-Roman wrestling matches took place on 24–27 July.

The most successful wrestling country was the Soviet Union, whose athletes won six gold and a total of ten medals in the sport. Sweden dominated free wrestling and received the second highest number of medals in wrestling overall. The overwhelming athlete in wrestling was the Soviet Johannes Kotkas, who competed in the heavy series of Greco-Roman wrestling. He managed to beat all his opponents in less than five minutes.

=== Weightlifting ===
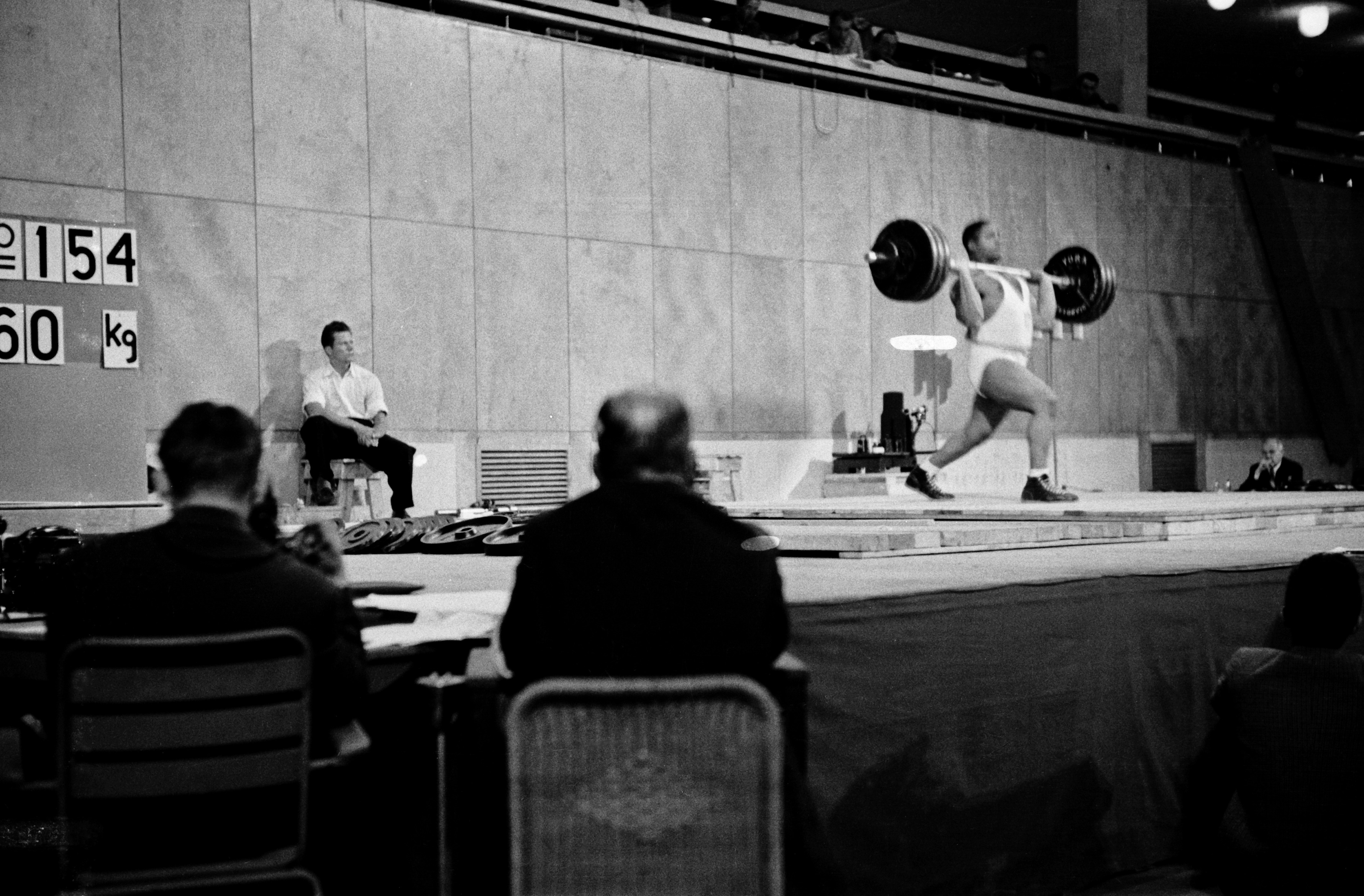
Weightlifting light heavyweight (90kg) competition in the Töölön kisahalli

The Olympic weightlifting competition was held in seven weight classes with 141 competitors. Initially, there were to be only six weight classes, but a light heavyweight series was also added to the program, as a result of which the weight limit for the heavyweight series increased from 82.5 kilograms to 90 kilograms. The addition of the new weight class took place so late that there was no time to change the race program. Weightlifting was carried out according to plan at the Exhibition Hall on 25–27 July.

All seven gold medals were awarded to athletes from the United States and the Soviet Union. The Soviets won a total of seven medals, but the Americans took four championships, while the Soviets only took three. A total of five world records were set in weightlifting. In the heavyweight series John Davis continued his superiority, Davis had not lost a single event since 1938 and continued with his victory in Helsinki as well.

=== Sailing ===
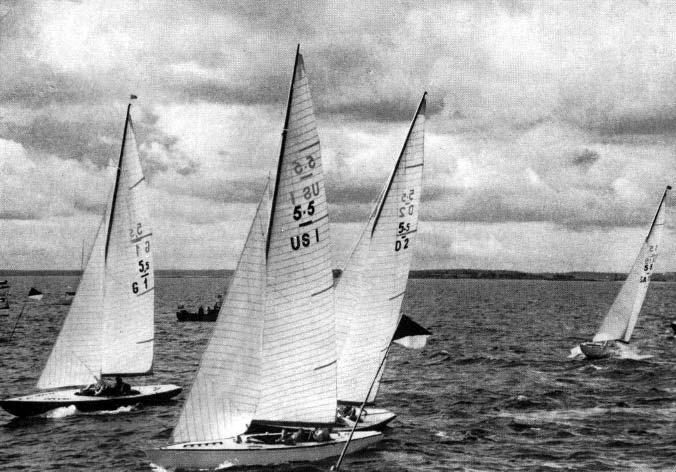
5.5m class competition. The second boat left is the championship winning Complex II.

The competition took place in the waters of Helsinki from 20 to 28 May in five different categories. Larger boats sailed in front of Harmaja lighthouse island, and the Finn race was held near Liuskasaari. A total of 93 crews from 29 countries took part in the competition.

The United States, Norway and Sweden took three medals. The United States was the only country to reach two gold medals in sailing. In the Finn that developed from the Firefly class, the Danish Paul Elvstrøm won the overwhelming championship. The gold medal was the second in Elvstrøm's career. He later became the first athlete to win the same sport four times in a row (individual disciplines).

=== Cycling ===
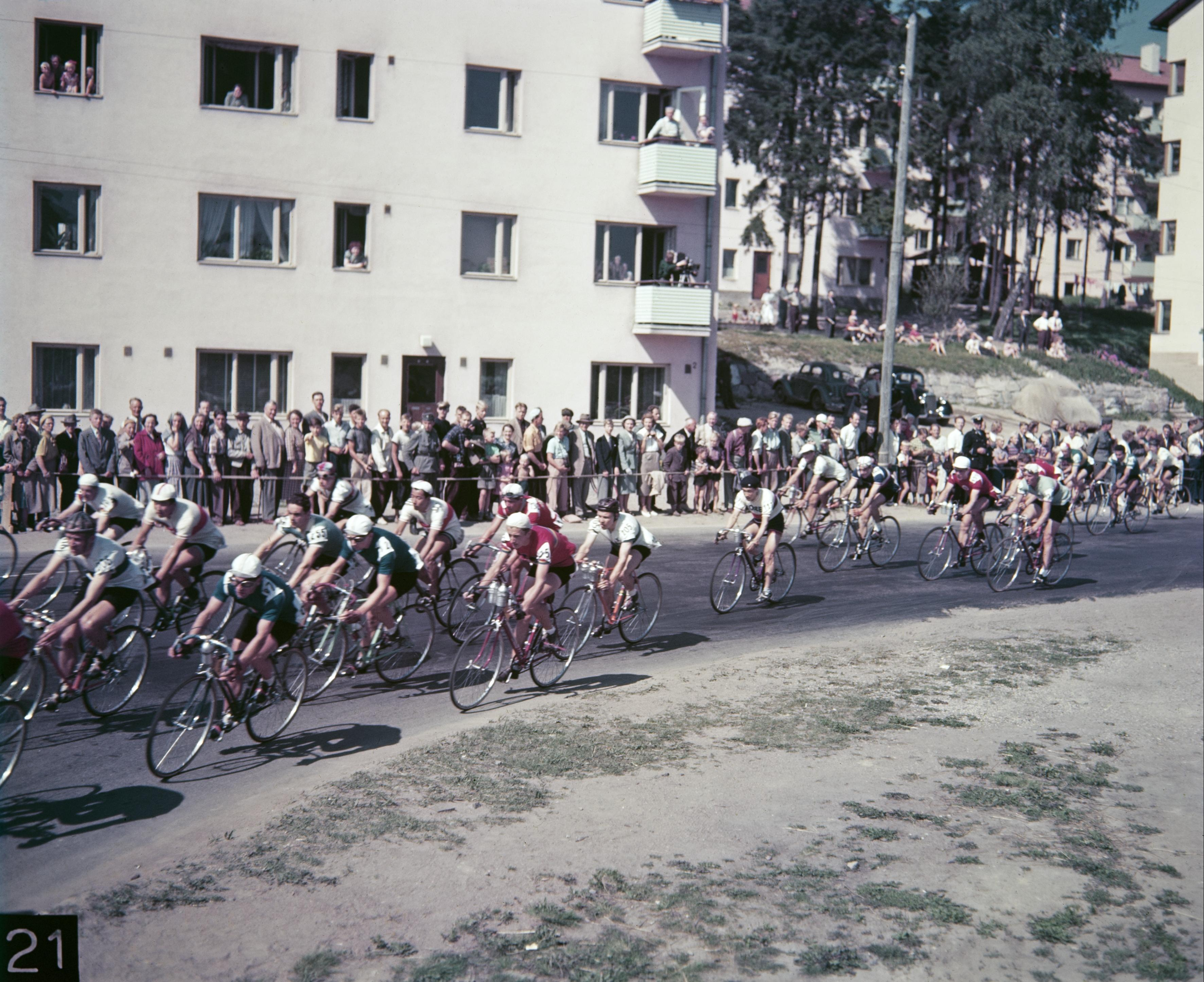
Racers turn from Käpyläntie to Koskelantie during the road cycling race.

In cycling, medals were awarded in six sports, four for track cycling and two for road racing. In total, 214 competitors from 36 countries took part in the cycling. Track cycling competitions were held from 29 to 31 July and road driving on 2 August.

A total of seven countries collected medals and gold medals went to Italy, Australia and Belgium. Italy was the most successful country with five medals. Two gold medals went to Australian Russell Mockridge, who won the championship in the kilometer time trial and with his partner in tandem racing, and the Belgian André Noyelle, who won the 190 kilometer road race personal competition and team competition.

=== Equestrian ===
Equestrian events were competed in dressage, Eventing and show jumping in person and in team competition in a total of six sports. Eight countries won medals in horseback riding, and Sweden was by far the most successful country. The Swedes won both races in both dressage and field riding.

For the events in first time non-military officers including women were allowed to take part in dressage events in Helsinki. In a show jumping, Danish Lis Hartel, paralyzed from her knees down, was the first woman to win a riding medal after finishing second in the Olympics.

=== Rowing ===
Rowers competed in seven sports from 20 to 23 July. The competition was held in Meilahti, as Taivallahti, where the canoeing competitions took place, was too open to the sea breeze. There were a total of 409 entrants from 33 countries.

Representatives from fourteen countries won medals, and only American rowers won two gold medals. The youngest Olympic winner of the Games was seen in Rowing. In the coxswain duo, the French winning team included 14 years old Bernard Malivoire.

=== Diving ===
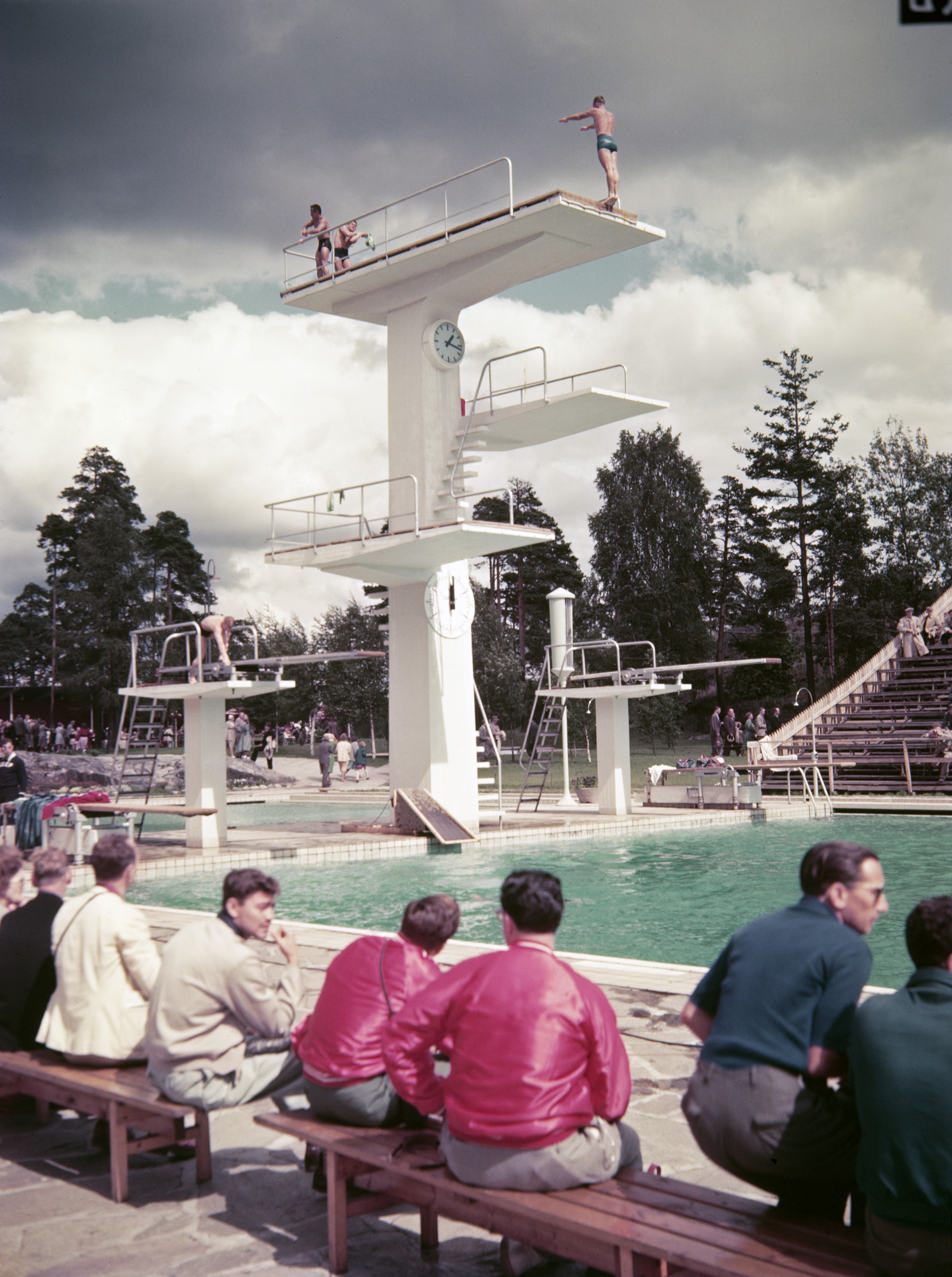
Diving competitions at Helsinki Swimming Stadium

Diving competed in a total of four men's and women's events. The United States led the events, as nine of the 12 medals in the distribution went to the country. In addition to the United States, only France, Mexico and Germany won medals in the sport. Patricia McCormick won Olympic gold in the women's events from both the three-meter springboard and the ten-meter floor jump.

=== Swimming ===
At the Helsinki Swimming Stadium men competed in six sports and women in five sports. High-level competitions were held from July 25 to 2 August. Summer Olympics in London had resulted in significant progress in the sport, and every Olympic record was broken in each event.

The Americans dominated men's events and the Hungarians dominated women. Both countries won four gold medals. Ford Konno was the most successful swimmer with two gold medals and one silver. In the women's events Katalin Szőke won two gold medals and Éva Novák two silver in addition to the gold medal. The only world record in the Games was set by the Hungarian women's 4 × 100 meter freestyle message team. The Helsinki Olympics, was the last instance where competitors could participate in Breaststroke in the butterfly stroke. In the men's events, no athlete swimming in the breaststroke style made it to the finals. In women, Novák won silver.

=== Water polo ===
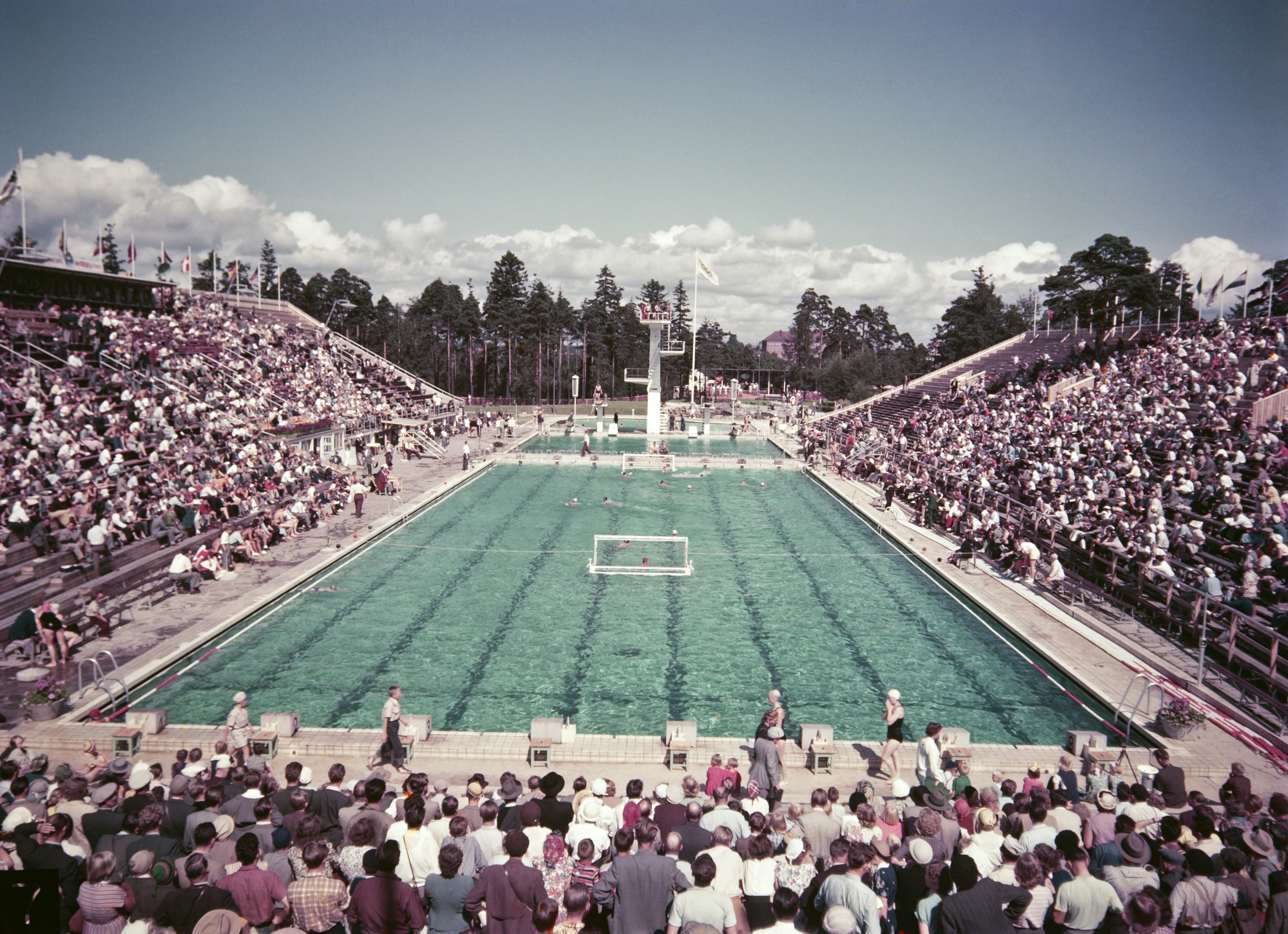
Water polo match at Helsinki Swimming Stadium

A total of 21 countries took part in the water polo tournament. The initial series of the Games was to be played in the offshore pools, but due to the coolness of the water, the International Swimming Federation ordered all the matches to be played at the Swimming Stadium. Because of this, some of the matches in the first series had to be played as early as six in the morning.

The water polo championship was decided in the final block, where the four teams faced each other once. Hungary and Yugoslavia ended in a draw after winning two other matches and playing 2–2 each other. Hungary won gold with a better goal difference.

=== Gymnastics ===
The 1952 Olympic gymnastics was dominated by the Soviet Union, which had already been an established gymnastics power by 1952. The USSR's athletes won nine gold medals and took a total of 22 medals. Finland, Germany and Switzerland, who previously dominated the gymnastics at the Olympics, were content with more modest success. A total of fifteen medals were awarded, eight in men's events and seven in women's events.

The most personal medals in gymnastics were taken by Viktor Chukarin in the men's events and Maria Gorokhovskaya in the women's events. Chukarin won four gold and two silver. Gorokhovskaya won medals in every women's sport. Her seven-medal catch (two gold and five silver) was a record for one women's Olympics.

Although the Official Olympic Report for the 1952 Helsinki Olympics does not specifically state that this was the first time that medals were awarded to women for individual performances, it does state "Individual competitions in women's gymnastics were included in the Olympic Programme for the first time." World Gymnastics, the official governing body for the sport, stated about those games "1952 marked the first year an individual women's competition was held in addition to a team competition". What is currently listed here on Wikipedia as well as what is written about the 1952 Olympics in an article on one gymnastics blog ("It was the first time women would be granted individual medals") strongly suggest that no individual Olympic medals were awarded to individual woman gymnasts prior to 1952, and that these games were the first where they were awarded.

=== Athletics ===
Emil Zátopek

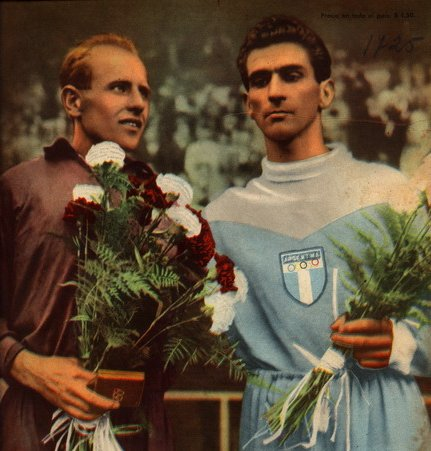
Emil Zátopek and Reinaldo Gorno after the marathon.

Athletics was competed in 33 sports, 24 for men and 9 for women. By far the most successful state was the United States, which won 31 medals, nine of which were gold. The Soviet Union reached 17 medals, but won only two championships, and the eight-medal country Germany was left without first places. The second medalist was Czechoslovakia, with four of the five medals being the brightest.

Emil Zátopek won the 5,000 and 10,000 meters, as well as the marathon, which he had never run before, all in new Olympic record times. On the women's side, the Australian Marjorie Jackson won the 100 and 200 meter runs. World records were set in seven events. In the triple jump Adhemar Ferreira da Silva broke the old world record four times. In the decathlon, Bob Mathias made a new ME and took the victory with a total score of 7,887 points, more than 900 points to the next. Josy Barthel of Luxembourg pulled a major surprise by winning the 1500 m.

=== Demonstration sports ===
According to the Olympic rules, the organizer of the Games was allowed to choose between two types of demonstration sports, one from abroad and one from Finland. In connection with the Helsinki Games, a handball and pesäpallo (Finnish baseball) match was held. In the handball match of the Games, Sweden and Denmark faced at the Olympic Stadium. The level of playing outside was modest due to heavy rain. Sweden won by a goal from 19 to 11.

The pesäpallo match was also played at the Olympic Stadium. The Finnish Baseball Federation and Finnish Workers' Sports Federation teams competed in the event. The Baseball Federation won the match 8–4. During the breaks in both shows, the audience was entertained by the performances of Finnish male and female gymnasts.

Events of the 1952 Summer Olympics
- Aquatics
  - Diving (4)
  - Swimming (11)
  - Water polo (1)
- Athletics (33)
- Basketball (1)
- Boxing (10)
- Canoeing (9)
- Cycling
  - Road (2)
  - Track (4)
- Equestrian
  - Dressage (2)
  - Eventing (2)
  - Show jumping (2)
- Fencing (7)
- Field hockey (1)
- Football (1)
- Gymnastics (15)
- Modern pentathlon (2)
- Rowing (7)
- Sailing (5)
- Shooting (7)
- Weightlifting (7)
- Wrestling
  - Freestyle (8)
  - Greco-Roman (8)
- Handball (Demonstration)
- Pesäpallo (Demonstration)

== Venues ==
With an annual average temperature of 5.9 °C (42.6 °F), Helsinki is one of the coldest cities to have hosted the Summer Olympics.

Most of the competition venues were located in Helsinki Metropolitan Area. Modern pentathlon and some field hockey games were held in Hämeenlinna and some football games by Tampere, Lahti, Kotka and Turku.

The main arena was the Olympic Stadium, which hosted the opening and closing ceremonies, athletics competitions, football semi-finals and finals, as well as the show jumping competition "Prix des Nations" were held. The stadium was built for the 1940 Olympics and opened as early as 1938, but had suffered under the bombing of World War II. It had to undergo expansion and refurbishment work. The concrete auditorium section was expanded and a new temporary wooden auditorium was built on the south and north curves and on the east side, which increased the Stadium's audience capacity to about 70,000.

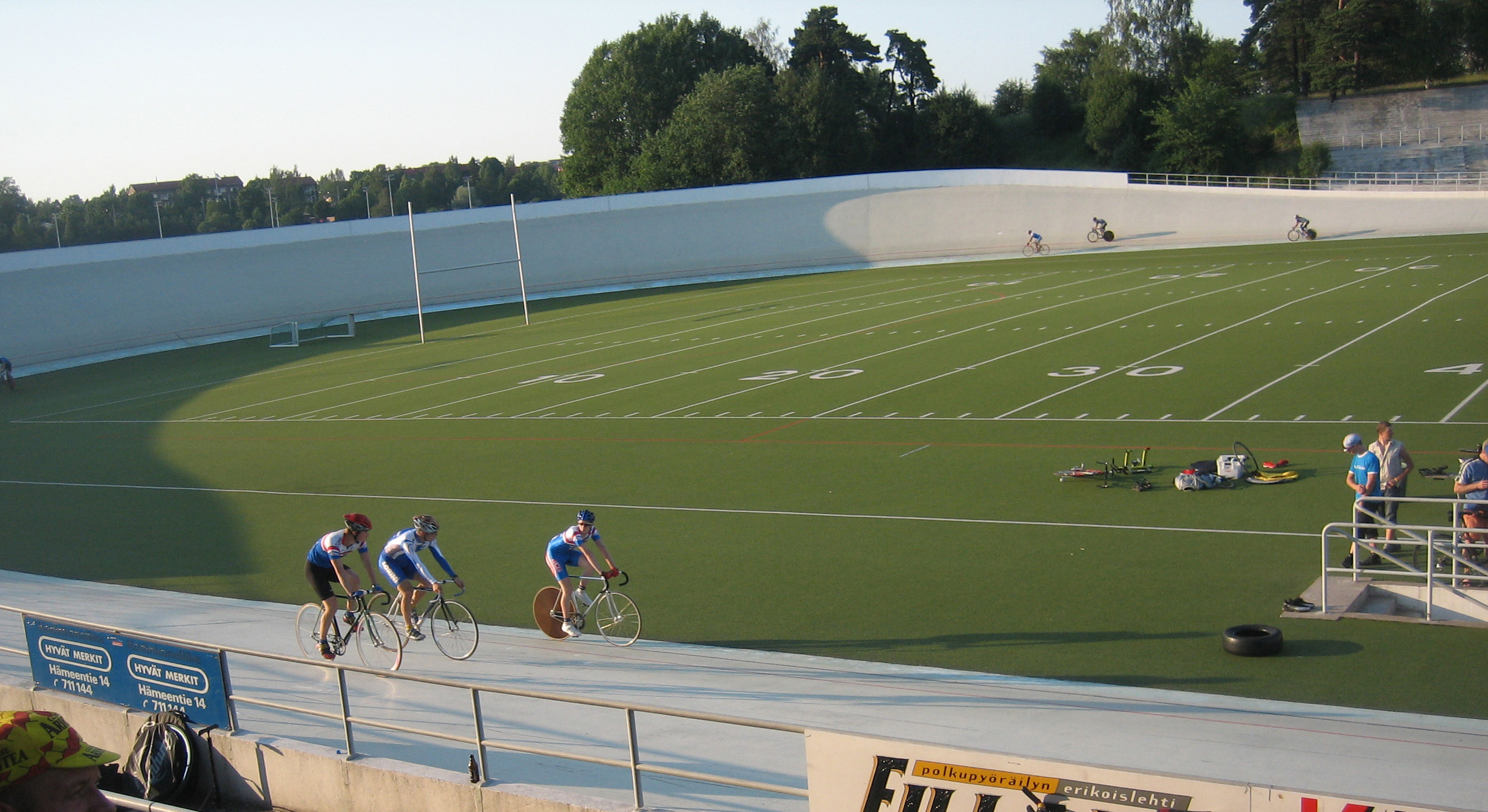
The Helsinki Velodrome was used to cycle the Olympic starts. Pictured are cyclists from the 2006 Bicycle Race.

The swimming competitions were held at Helsinki Swimming Stadium, located just a few hundred meters east of the Olympic Stadium and with three pools: a racing, diving and children's pool. The swimming stadium could accommodate about 9,500 spectators, while the wooden eastern and standing stands for the Games could accommodate a total of about 6,000 people. The Fair Hall near the stadiums (now Töölö Sports Hall) many of the indoor events were held in two separate halls. In the bigger hall, men competed in gymnastics, wrestling and boxing. The smaller hall hosts the women's gymnastics, freestyle wrestling, weightlifting and basketball finals. Basketball first round matches were played at Tennis Palace and fencing competitions were held at the Westend tennis center in Espoo.

The shooting events took place at the Malmi shooting range 11 kilometers from the center of Helsinki, with the exception of clay pigeon shooting. Clay pigeon shooting was performed on the Finnish Hunters' Association track Huopalahti.Ruskeasuo competed in dressage as well as in Tali and Laakso in field riding.

The Töölö Rowing Stadium was built for rowing and canoeing events one kilometer from Taivallahti. However, the place was not accepted as a place for rowing competitions, as it was open to the sea breeze. The rowing took place in Meilahti about three kilometers from the Stadium. The place was considerably more sheltered than Taivallahti. Harmaja, a lighthouse island a couple of kilometers off the coast of Helsinki, was the starting and finishing area for larger sailing classes. Finn was the starting and finish point of the race Liuskasaari close to the coast.

The Marathon running route was north of the Stadium to Käpylä, Pakinkylä, Tuomarinkylä, Vantaa, Tikkurila and Korso. In Tuusula, Mätäkivenmäki there was a turning point from which the runners set off on their way back to the Stadium. The 50-kilometer walk was organized along the same route. A memorial stone was later erected at the turning point along Old Tuusulantie.

A swimming stadium was built in Hämeenlinna for Ahvenisto for the pentathlon. The other four pentathlon events were also held in the vicinity of Ahvenisto.

Venues of the 1952 Summer Olympics
- Hämeenlinna – Modern pentathlon
- Harmaja – Sailing
- Helsinki Football Grounds – Football
- Huopalahti – Shooting (shotgun)
- Käpylä – Cycling (road)
- Kotka – Football
- Laakso – Equestrian (eventing – riding)
- Lahti – Football
- Liuskasaari – Sailing
- Malmi Rifle Range – Shooting (pistol/ rifle)
- Maunula – Cycling (road)
- Meilahti – Rowing
- Messuhalli – Basketball (final), boxing, gymnastics, weightlifting, wrestling
- Olympic Stadium – Athletics, Equestrian (jumping), Football (final)
- Pakila – Cycling (road)
- Ruskeasuo Equestrian Hall – Equestrian (dressage, eventing)
- Swimming Stadium – Diving, Swimming, Water polo
- Taivallahti – Canoeing
- Tali Race Track – Equestrian (eventing steeplechase)
- Tampere – Football
- Tennis Palace – Basketball
- Turku – Football
- Velodrome – Cycling (track), Field hockey
- Westend Tennis Hall – Fencing

== Participating National Olympic Committees ==
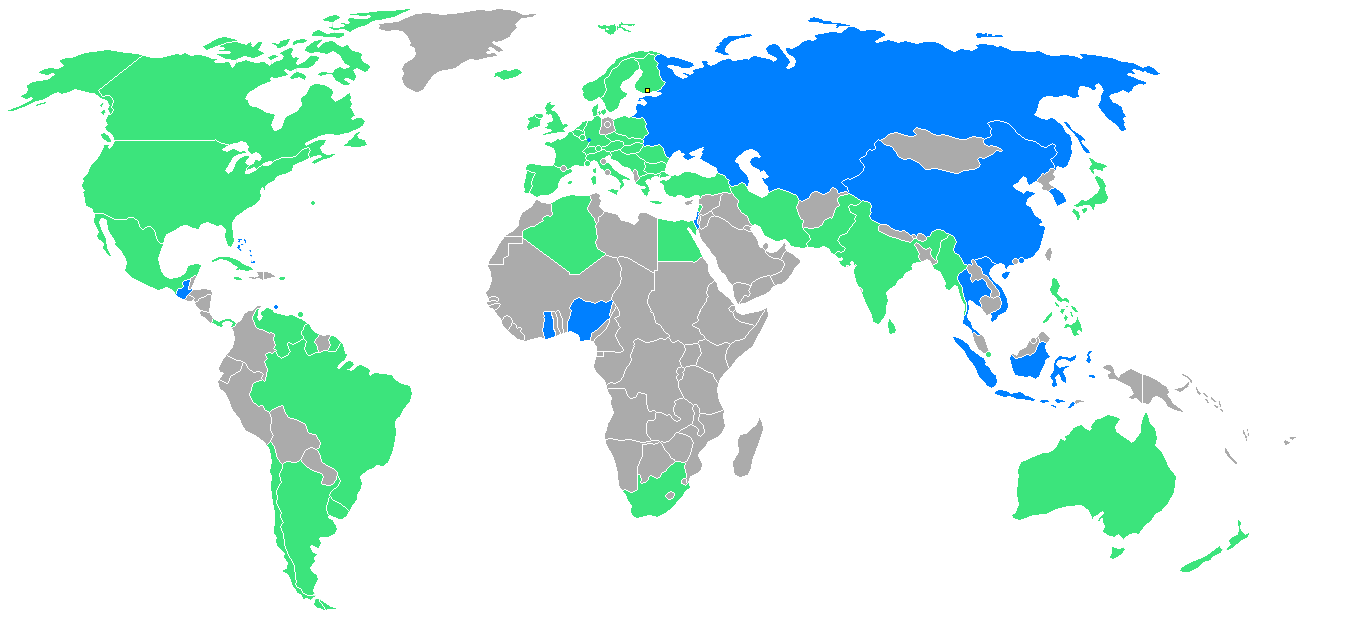
Participating nations. Pictured in blue are nations participating for the first time. Yellow dot: Helsinki

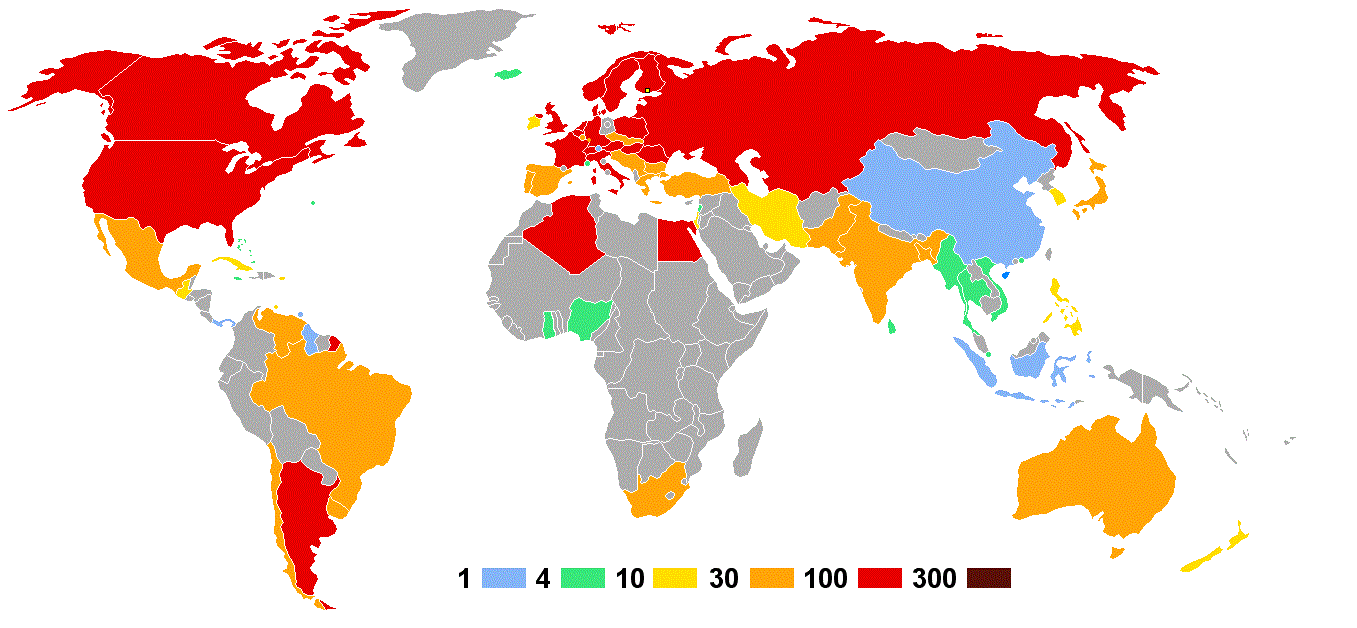
Number of athletes per country

A total of 69 nations participated in these Games, up from 59 in the 1948 Games. Thirteen nations made their first Olympic appearance in 1952: The Bahamas, the People's Republic of China, Gold Coast (now Ghana), Guatemala, Hong Kong, Indonesia, Israel, Netherlands Antilles, Nigeria, the Soviet Union (USSR), Thailand, and Vietnam.

Japan and Germany were both reinstated and permitted to send athletes after being banned for 1948 for their instigation of World War II. Due to the division of Germany, German athletes from Saar entered a separate team for the only time. Only West Germany would provide athletes for the actual German team, since East Germany refused to participate in a joint German team.

Romania returned to the games in this edition.

Nations that participated in the previous games in London 1948 but were absent in Helsinki 1952 included Afghanistan, Colombia, Iraq, Malta, Peru and Syria.

Puerto Rico is an unincorporated territory and commonwealth of the United States. Bahamas, Bermuda, Gold Coast (modern-day Ghana), Hong Kong, Jamaica, Nigeria, Singapore, Trinidad and Tobago, and British Guyana was all part of the British Empire. Netherlands Antilles was a constituent country of the Kingdom of Netherlands.

The Soviet Union sent the largest delegation.

Participating National Olympic Committees
- Argentina (123)
- Australia (81)
- Austria (112)
- Bahamas (7)
- Belgium (135)
- Bermuda (6)
- Brazil (97)
- Bulgaria (63)
- Burma (5)
- Canada (107)
- Ceylon (5)
- Chile (59)
- China (1)
- Cuba (29)
- Czechoslovakia (99)
- Denmark (129)
- Egypt (106)
- Finland (258) (host)
- France (245)
- Germany (205)
- Ghana (7)
- Great Britain (257)
- Greece (48)
- Guatemala (21)
- Guyana (1)
- Hong Kong (4)
- Hungary (189)
- Iceland (9)
- India (64)
- Indonesia (3)
- Iran (22)
- Ireland (19)
- Israel (25)
- Italy (231)
- Jamaica (8)
- Japan (69)
- Lebanon (9)
- Liechtenstein (2)
- Luxembourg (44)
- Mexico (64)
- Monaco (8)
- Netherlands (104)
- Netherlands Antilles (11)
- New Zealand (14)
- Nigeria (9)
- Norway (102)
- Pakistan (38)
- Panama (1)
- Philippines (25)
- Poland (125)
- Portugal (71)
- Puerto Rico (21)
- Romania (114)
- Saar (36)
- Singapore (5)
- South Africa (64)
- South Korea (19)
- Soviet Union (295)
- Spain (27)
- Sweden (206)
- Switzerland (157)
- Thailand (8)
- Trinidad and Tobago (2)
- Turkey (51)
- United States (286)
- Uruguay (32)
- Venezuela (38)
- Vietnam (8)
- Yugoslavia (87)

=== Number of athletes by National Olympic Committees ===
IOC Letter Code	Country	Athletes
ARG	Argentina	123
AUS	Australia	81
AUT	Austria	112
BAH	Bahamas	7
BEL	Belgium	135
BER	Bermuda	6
BRA	Brazil	97
BUL	Bulgaria	63
BIR	Burma	5
CAN	Canada	107
CEY	Ceylon	5
CHI	Chile	59
PRC	China	1
CUB	Cuba	29
TCH	Czechoslovakia	99
DEN	Denmark	129
EGY	Egypt	106
FIN	Finland	258
FRA	France	245
GER	Germany	205
GHA	Ghana	7
GBR	Great Britain	257
GRE	Greece	48
GUA	Guatemala	21
GUY	Guyana	1
HKG	Hong Kong	4
HUN	Hungary	189
ISL	Iceland	9
IND	India	64
INA	Indonesia	3
IRN	Iran	22
IRL	Ireland	19
ISR	Israel	25
ITA	Italy	231
JAM	Jamaica	8
JPN	Japan	69
LIB	Lebanon	9
LIE	Liechtenstein	2
LUX	Luxembourg	44
MEX	Mexico	64
MON	Monaco	8
NED	Netherlands	104
AHO	Netherlands Antilles	11
NZL	New Zealand	14
NGR	Nigeria	9
NOR	Norway	102
PAK	Pakistan	38
PAN	Panama	1
PHI	Philippines	25
POL	Poland	125
POR	Portugal	71
PUR	Puerto Rico	21
ROU	Romania	114
SAA	Saar	36
SIN	Singapore	5
ZAF	South Africa	64
KOR	South Korea	19
URS	Soviet Union	295
ESP	Spain	27
SWE	Sweden	206
SUI	Switzerland	157
THA	Thailand	11
TRI	Trinidad and Tobago	2
TUR	Turkey	51
USA	United States	286
URU	Uruguay	32
VEN	Venezuela	38
VNM	Vietnam	8
YUG	Yugoslavia	87
Total		4,932

== Medal count ==
These are the top ten nations that won medals at the 1952 Games.

Rank	Nation	Gold	Silver	Bronze	Total
1	United States	40	19	17	76
2	Soviet Union	22	30	19	71
3	Hungary	16	10	16	42
4	Sweden	12	13	10	35
5	Italy	8	9	4	21
6	Czechoslovakia	7	3	3	13
7	France	6	6	6	18
8	Finland*	6	3	13	22
9	Australia	6	2	3	11
10	Norway	3	2	0	5
Totals (10 entries)		126	97	91	314

== 50th anniversary coin ==
The 50th anniversary of the Helsinki Olympic Games was the main motif for one of the first Finnish euro silver commemorative coins, the €10 silver coin minted in 2002. The reverse depicts part of the Helsinki Olympic Stadium, as well as a section of the 1952 500 markka coin. The obverse has lettering SUOMI FINLAND 10 EURO, a flame, and Finland is the only country highlighted on Earth.

== Admission tickets ==
In total 2,394,099 admission tickets were printed for the Helsinki games. About two million of them were made Bank of Finland banknote printing works. To prevent counterfeiting, tickets were printed on watermark banknote paper. Printing began in July 1951 and lasted four months.

In early 1952, the race organizers opened their own ticket offices for sales at home and abroad. They were sold abroad in 52 countries. Half of the more than two million admission tickets were put up for sale abroad. However, only about 250,000 tickets were sold. However, foreign tourists also bought a lot of tickets from Finland. A total of 1,376,512 tickets were sold for various competition events. There were four different price categories. Prices varied between 300 and 2,100 FIM, which in current currency corresponds to about 9–65 euros. Ticket revenue totaled approximately FIM 965 million, or EUR 29.7 million.

Entrance tickets were printed in ten different colors, depending on the venue and the auditorium. Except for the color, the flags were all similar in appearance. The texts in Finnish, Swedish, English and French were printed on them, and the sport was also indicated by a symbol in the upper left corner. A spectator map was printed on the back of the entrance tickets. Tickets sold to Finland only marked their Price Category, foreign tickets also marked the price US Dollars.

In addition to tickets made by the organizers, the City of Hämeenlinna printed its own entry tickets for modern pentathlon competitions held locally. They were simpler in design than other tickets.

== Impact and legacy ==
The Olympics influenced the Finns, the City of Helsinki and the image of foreigners. The Olympics can even be considered a symbolic decision for the post-war years in Finland. Reconstruction of the land was practically completed in 1952, although at the beginning of the decade many had lived in temporary housing. The last war reparations was paid in September 1952, and regulatory policy was abolished at the same time.

On the closing day of the Games, 3 August 1952, President J.K. Paasikivi wrote in his diary: "The Olympics were a great success. Foreigners, including the magazines, have praised the good organization. This is a good thing and advertising for us."

Helsinki cityscape was clearly a new impetus for the Olympics. The development of Helsinki had already begun in the late 1930s, when Parliament House, Lasipalatsi and Pääposti were built. Olympic dreams motivate many construction projects. Helsinki's entertainment and nightlife was modest compared to previous race hosts. Many temporary restaurants and entertainment venues were set up in the city for the Games. The city had been planning a fair for decades, but even for this project, the Olympic host gave the final impetus. After the competition was confirmed, the city of Helsinki started looking for a place for an amusement park in Alppila. The Linnanmäki Amusement Park was opened on 27 May 1950 on a plot leased in December 1949. The Olympics also developed Helsinki's infrastructure with the construction of a new airport, Olympic Pier, new asphalt and the city's first traffic lights. The Olympic spirit was also visible outside the capital region. In 1952, Finland's first rest stop for motorists was opened in Lahnajärvi, along the former Highway 1 (current road 110).

The impact of the Olympics on Finns is difficult to define. It was certainly good for Finns' self-confidence to create a successful major event together and at the same time get a new kind of contact with the interaction between peoples. For the first time, many Finns were in contact with non-Caucasian foreigners at the Games. At the same time, the Olympics united Finns in their disputes. For example, Finnish Workers' Sports Federation and Finnish Sports Federation strong disputes between were on a break during the Olympics, even though they continued even after the Games.

With internationalization, new products also arrived in Finland. The best known of these is Coca-Cola (Coca-Cola arrived in Finland as early as the 1930s through Stockmann). In addition, chewing gum was imported for the first time, and Alko launched new drinks, including Gin Long Drink.

Finland's relations with United Kingdom clearly warmed up thanks to the Olympics. This was particularly influenced by the fact that Prince Philip, who came to visit the Games, received a warm welcome in Finland. After the Second World War, Britain had been rude to Finland, but the Olympics showed that Finland belonged to the Western world.

=== "The Last Real Olympics" ===
In Finland, the Helsinki Olympics are sometimes called the last real Olympics, when trying to emphasize the nature of the Games as the last Games of the true Olympic spirit, a sporting and non-commercial event. For example, a book about competitions written by Antero Raevuori is named after this saying. However, the phrase was invented in Finland and is not used elsewhere in the world. It was developed in the 1970s and 1980s, after widespread doping cases, the 1972 Munich massacre, and the 1976, 1980 and 1984 Olympics boycotts.

In a way, the Helsinki Olympics were a return to smaller competitions due to resources, as Finland is the smallest country to host the Summer Olympics. However the 1956 Summer Olympics involved fewer participating athletes than in Helsinki, and in practice it was not until the 1970s that the Games clearly began to expand. The Helsinki Olympics were still relatively non-commercial, although the Polish press, for example, barked at the Helsinki Olympics as "competitions for disgusting traders". The Helsinki Games were also not much smaller in terms of marketing than the following Games, and marketing was well known in the Olympic world with Kodak supporting the Games as far back as the 1896 Summer Olympics.

== Gallery ==
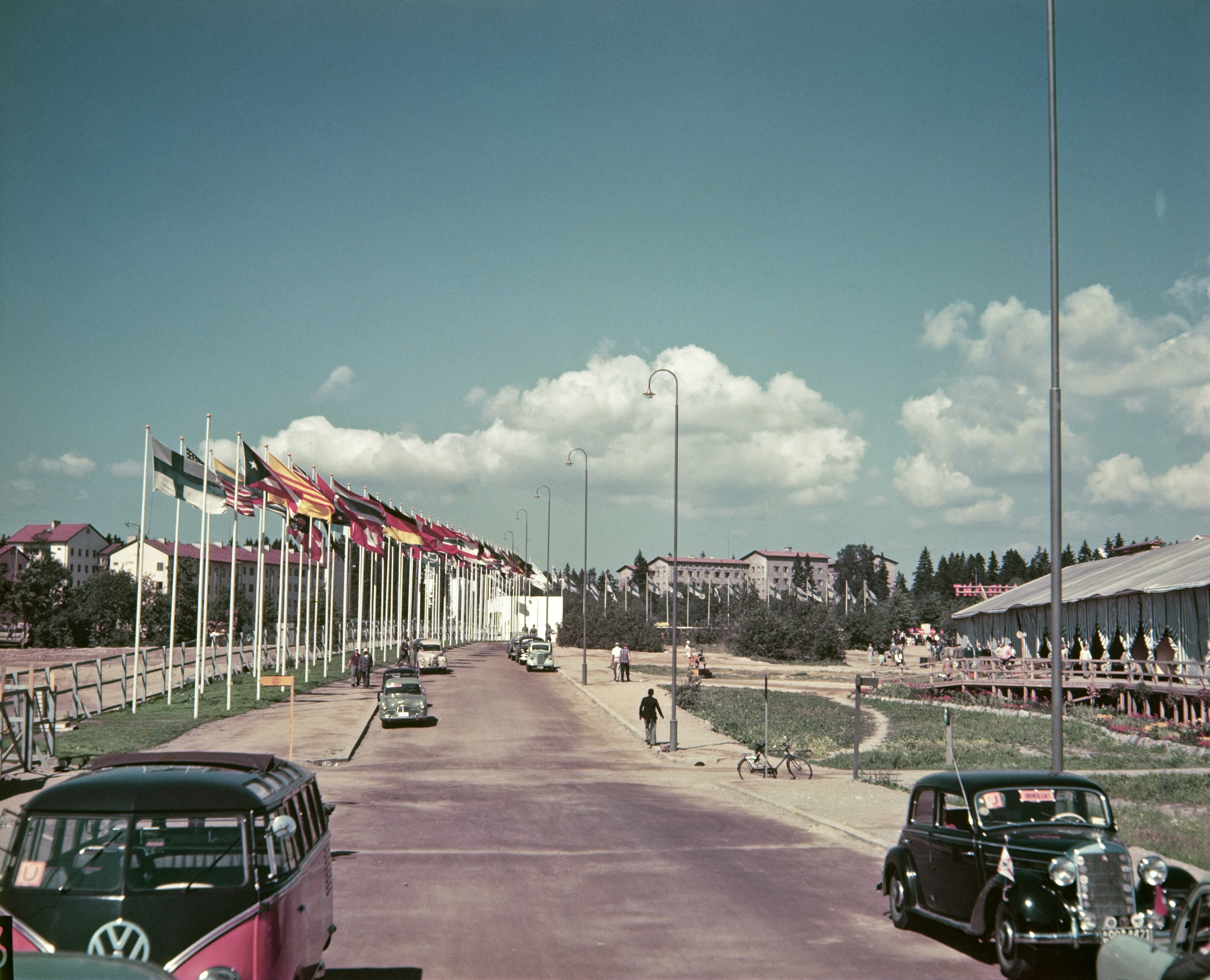
Flags

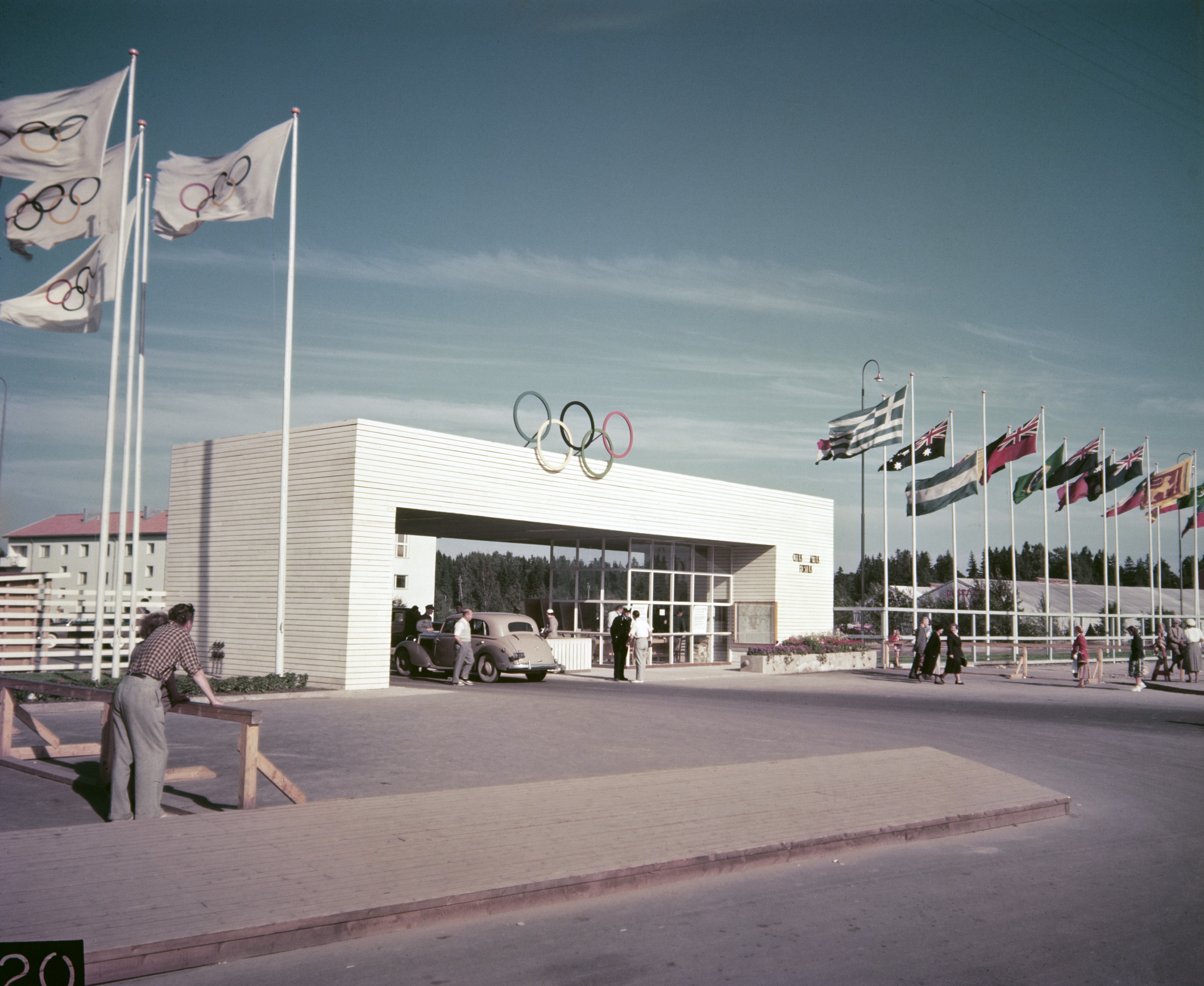
Entrance to the Olympic village

Road cycling

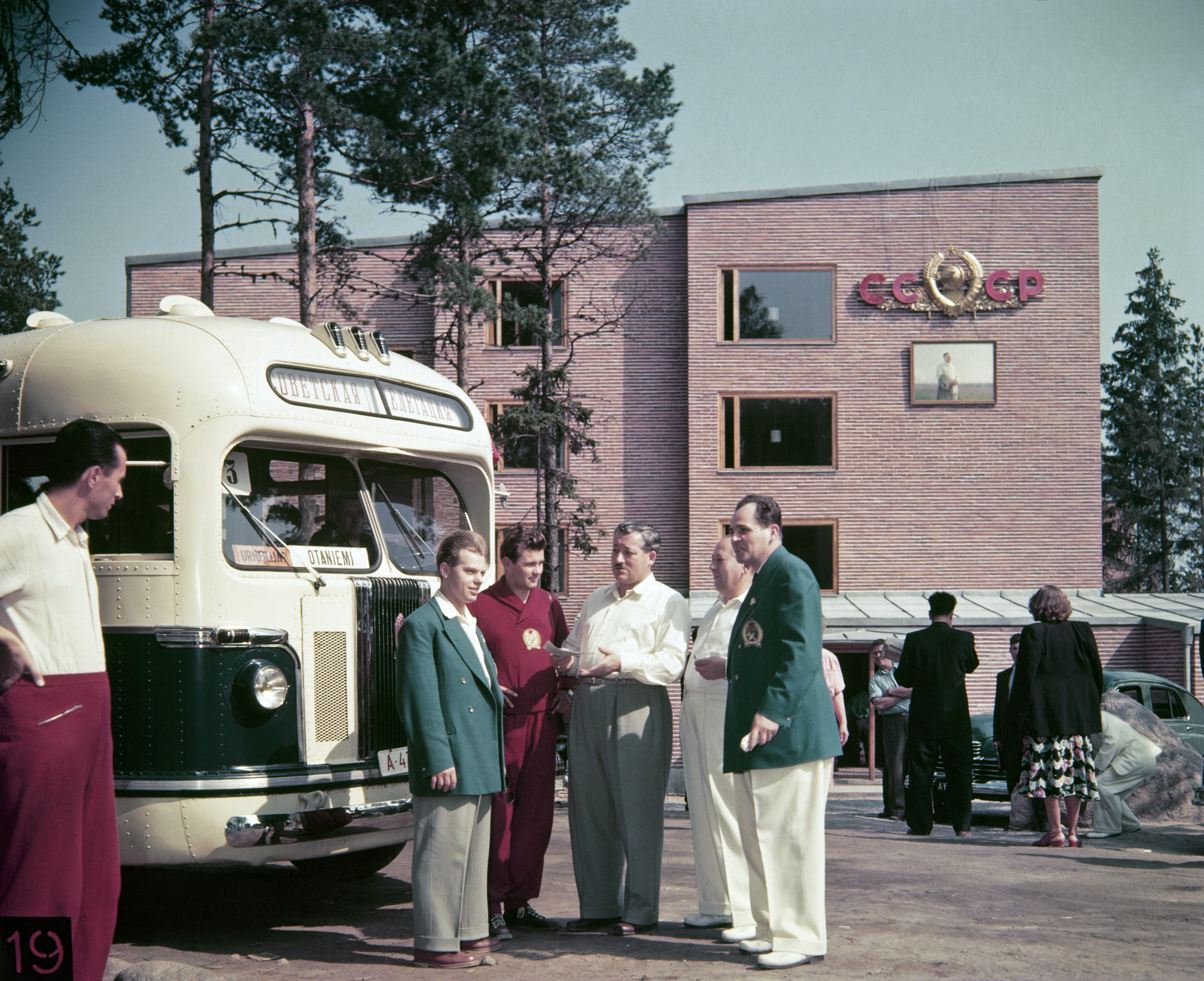
Soviet camp with insignia and a picture of Stalin

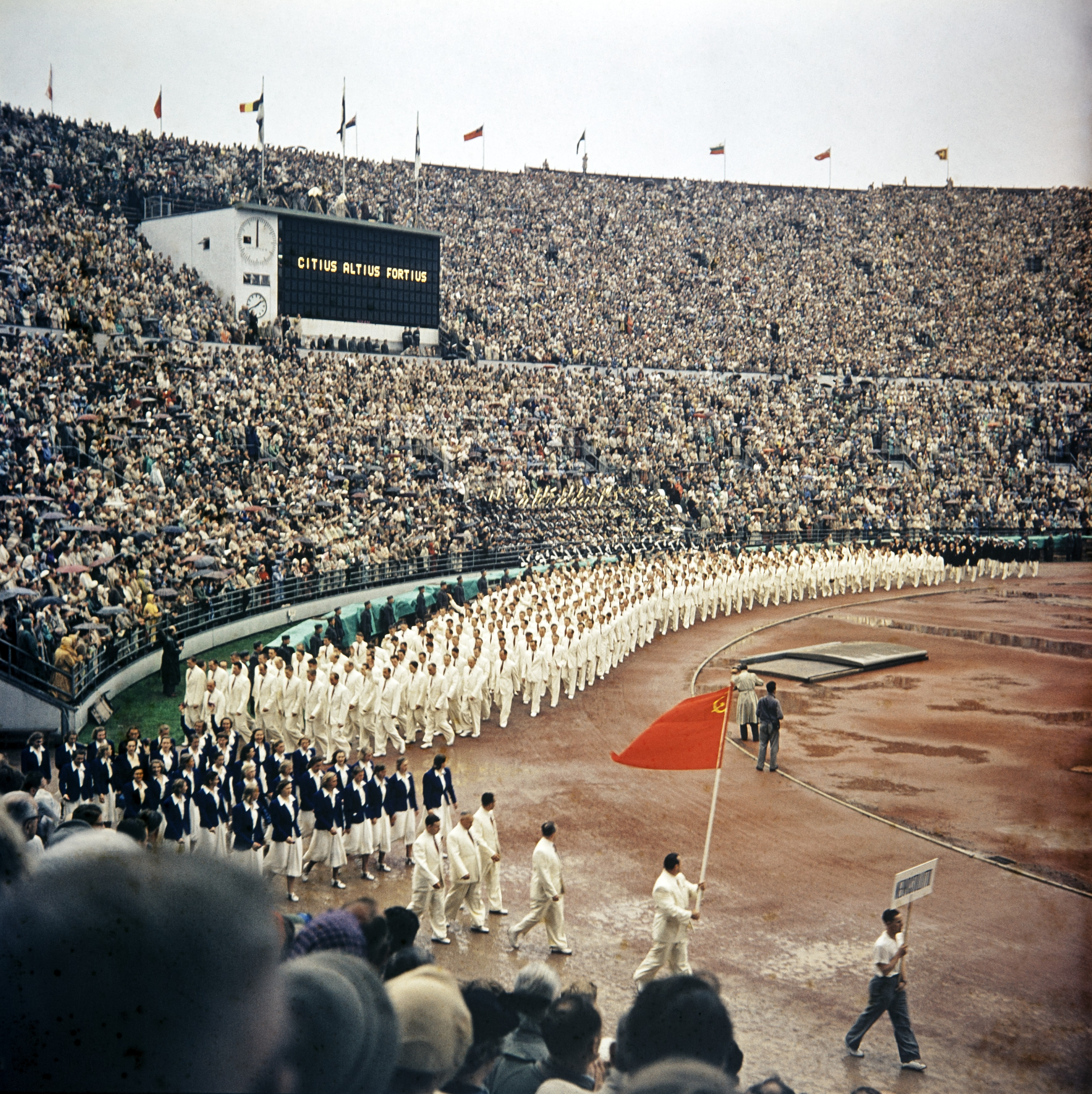
Soviet team entrance

Helsinki Olympic Stadium

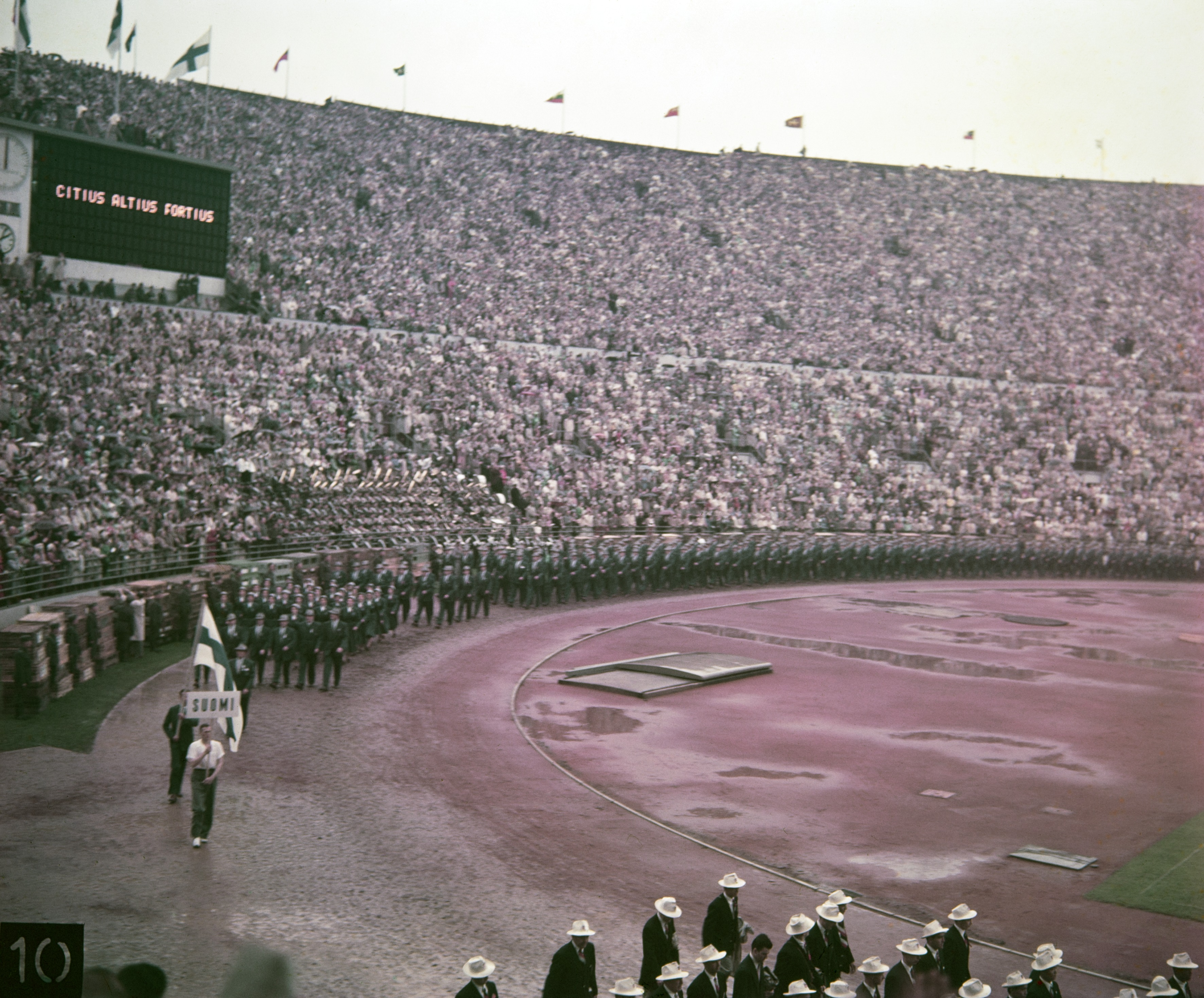
Finnish team entrance

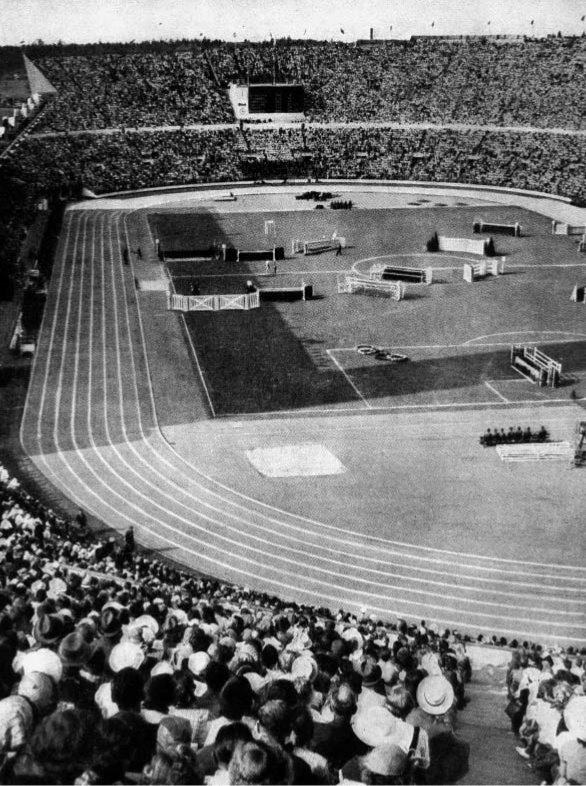
Just before the 2nd round of Prix des Nations

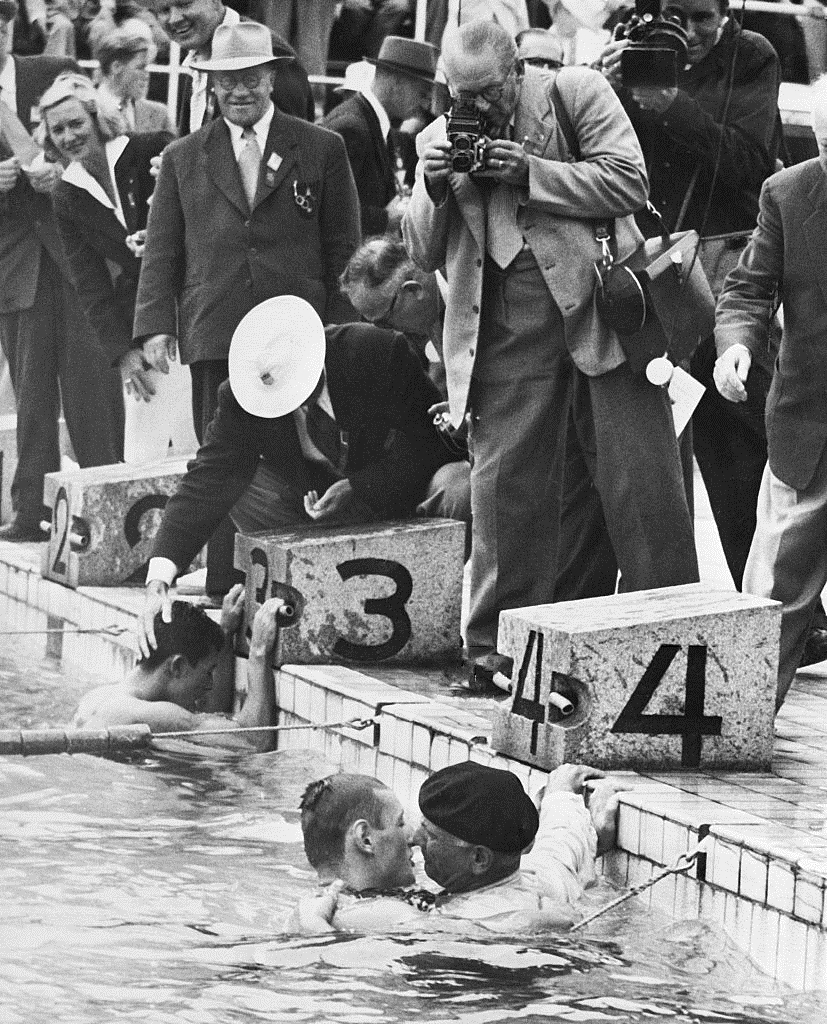
After Jean Boiteux won the 400 m freestyle race his father jumped into the pool to congratulate him

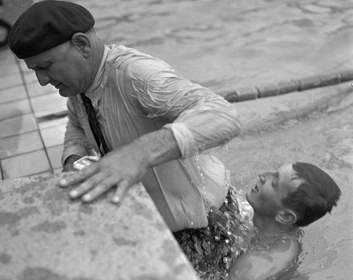
Boiteux helps his father climb out

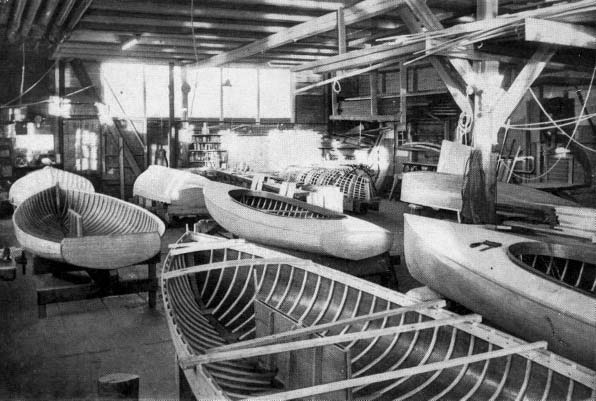
Building the Finn-class Olympic dinghies at Børresen Bådebyggeri, Denmark

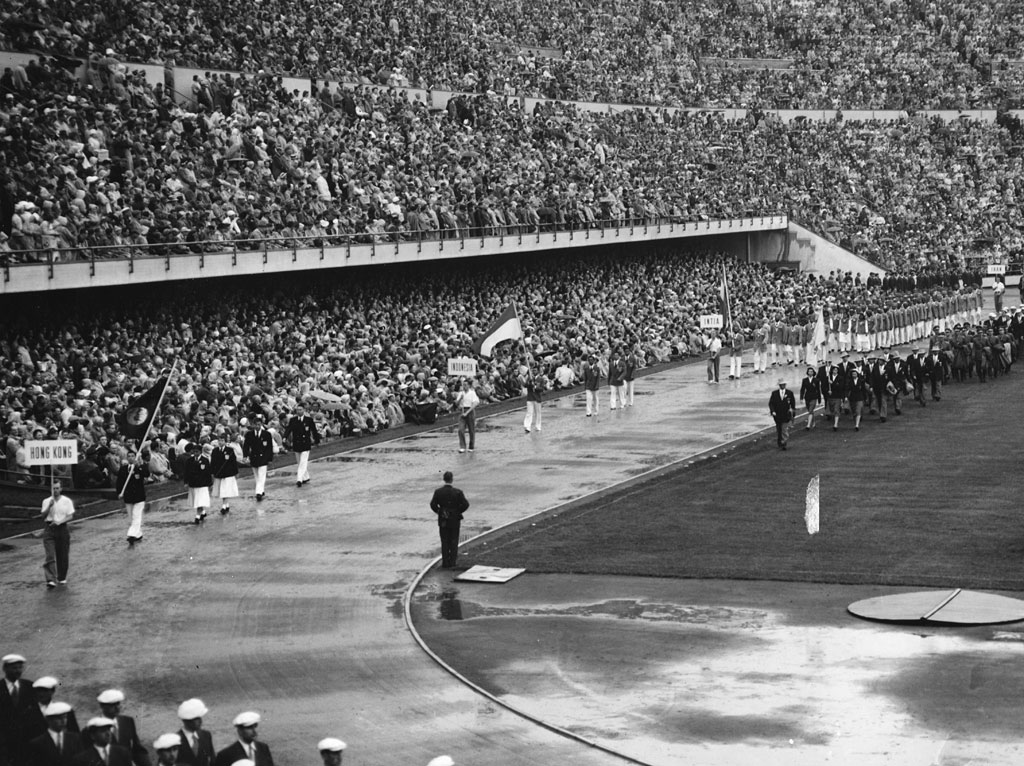
Nations enter

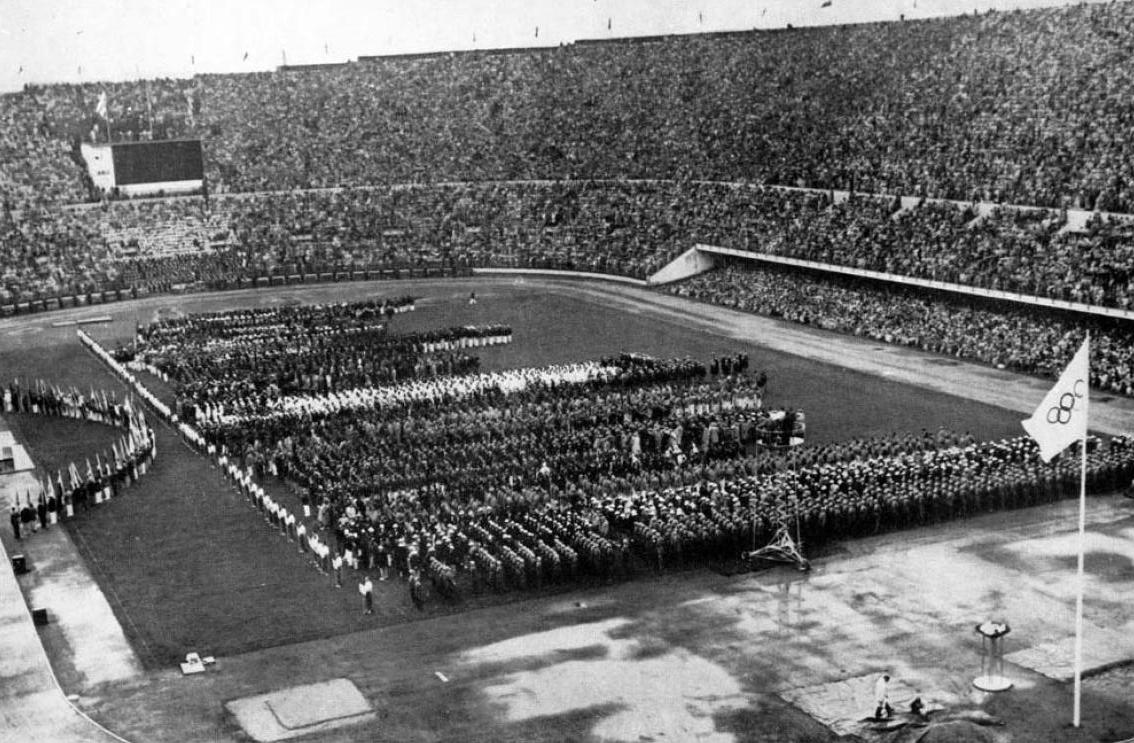
Nations at the 1952 Olympics

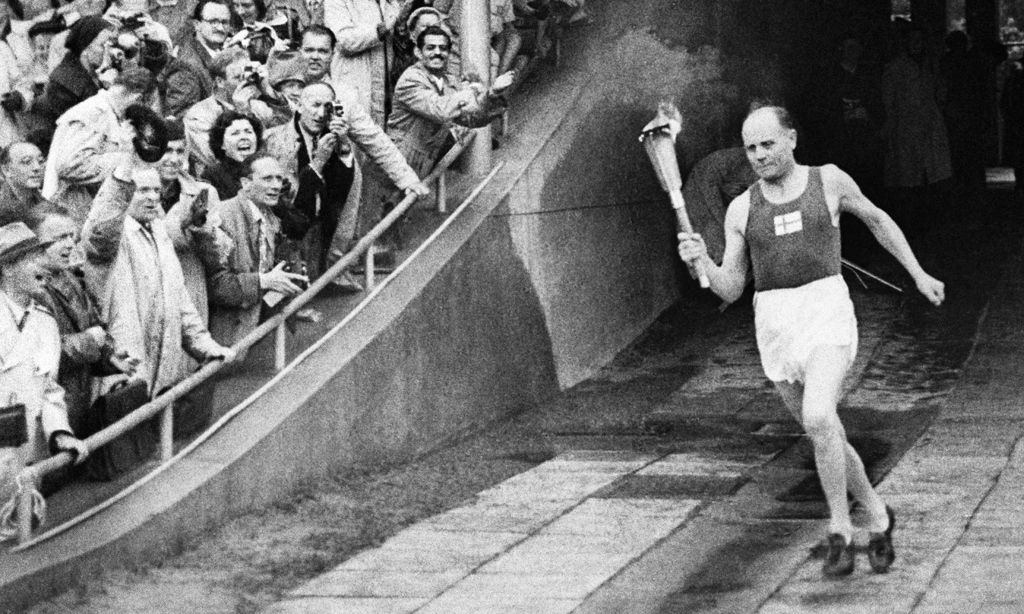
Paavo Nurmi enters the Helsinki Olympic Stadium carrying the torch during the opening ceremonies. He became the first well-known athlete to light the Olympic Flame.

== See also ==
- 1952 Winter Olympics
- List of IOC country codes
- 1952 Summer Olympics torch relay

Summer Olympics
Preceded by London	XV Olympiad; Helsinki; 1952	Succeeded by Melbourne/Stockholm
