= Zhang Banglun =

Chinese footballer (1919–2001)

Personal information
- Date of birth: 15 July 1919
- Place of birth: Songjiang District, Shanghai, Republic of China
- Date of death: 5 December 2001 (aged 82)
- Place of death: United States

International career
Years	Team	Apps	(Gls)
- China

Zhang Banglun (15 July 1919 – 5 December 2001) was a Chinese footballer. He competed in the men's tournament at the 1948 Summer Olympics.
