= Wu Chuanyu =

Chinese swimmer (1928–1954)

Personal information
- Native name: 吴传玉
- National team: Republic of China (1948); Indonesia (1951); China (1952–1954)
- Born: Wu Chuanyu; 21 August 1928 Salatiga, Central Java, Dutch East Indies
- Died: 28 October 1954 (aged 26) Mount Sivukha, Krasnoyarsk Krai, Russian SFSR, USSR

Sport
- Sport: Swimming
- Strokes: backstroke, freestyle

Wu Chuanyu (simplified Chinese: 吴传玉; traditional Chinese: 吳傳玉; pinyin: Wú Chuányù) (21 August 1928 – 28 October 1954) was an Indonesian-born Chinese swimmer who competed in the Summer Olympic Games in 1948 and 1952. In his second Games, he became the first competitor for the People's Republic of China in Olympic history.

== Biography ==
Wu was born in Salatiga, Central Java, Dutch East Indies (now Indonesia) on August 21, 1928, the son of immigrants from Fujian, a coastal province of southeastern China. He swam from an early age, playing as a child on the riverside of Surakarta. In 1941, at the age of 13, he performed beyond all expectations at an important swimming competition in Indonesia, setting a new Indonesian record for the 200 metre butterfly and beating the Dutch champion.

Wu was one of the 26 competitors—and the lone swimmer—representing the Republic of China at the 1948 Summer Olympics in London. Wu swam in the heats of the men's 100 metre freestyle, finishing fifth in his heat with the 32nd fastest time overall (1:03.5).

In the fall of 1951, at the age of 23, Wu represented Indonesia at the 3rd World Festival of Youth and Students in East Berlin, winning a silver medal in the 100 metre backstroke, with a time of 1:12.8.

At the 1952 Summer Olympics in Helsinki, Wu was part of the 40-member delegation from the People's Republic of China. The government decided to send the Olympic team only one day prior to the opening ceremonies, and the basketball and football teams arrived too late to compete, making Wu the only competitor for China at those Games. Wu swam in the heats of the men's 100 metre backstroke on July 30, and finished fifth in his heat with the 28th fastest time overall (1:12.3).

In August 1953, Wu competed at the 4th World Festival of Youth and Students in Bucharest, Romania. He won the 100 metre backstroke with a time of 1:06.4. His victory was so unexpected that the swimming organizers did not have a recording of the Chinese national anthem and had to borrow one from the athletics organizers. This medal ceremony was the first time that the flag of the People's Republic of China was raised at an international sporting event.

In 1954, Wu and the entire Chinese swimming team was sent to Budapest, Hungary to receive training. While in Budapest, Wu attended the 12th World Student Games.

== Death ==
Wu returned to China, where he attended the first National People's Congress. After the conclusion of the Congress, Wu died in an airplane crash on 28 October 1954 midnight in Krasnoyarsk Krai, Soviet Union, at the age of 26 while traveling to Budapest to resume his training. The flight was from Beijing to Moscow with multiple stops in between with different flight numbers. The plane flew into the side of Mount Sivukha. On board were nine foreign passengers (the other eight were 4 Poles and 4 Cypriots). For years after his death, his skills were extolled by Chinese Communist Party chairman Mao Zedong.
