= Rowing at the 1952 Summer Olympics =

Rowing at the Games of the XV Olympiad
- Dates: 20–23 July 1952
- Competitors: 404 from 33 nations

Rowing at the 1952 Summer Olympics featured seven events, for men only. The competitions were held from 20 to 23 July.

== Medal summary ==
Games	Gold	Silver	Bronze
single sculls	Yuriy Tyukalov; Soviet Union	Mervyn Wood; Australia	Teodor Kocerka; Poland
double sculls	Tranquilo Cappozzo and Eduardo Guerrero; Argentina	Heorhiy Zhylin and Ihor Yemchuk; Soviet Union	Miguel Seijas and Juan Rodríguez; Uruguay
coxless pairs	Charlie Logg and Tom Price; United States	Michel Knuysen and Bob Baetens; Belgium	Kurt Schmid and Hans Kalt; Switzerland
Coxed pair	France; Raymond Salles; Gaston Mercier; Bernard Malivoire	Germany; Heinz Manchen; Helmut Heinhold; Helmut Noll	Denmark; Svend Ove Pedersen; Poul Svendsen; Jørgen Frantzen
coxless fours	Yugoslavia; Duje Bonačić; Velimir Valenta; Mate Trojanović; Petar Šegvić	France; Pierre Blondiaux; Jean-Jacques Guissart; Marc Bouissou; Roger Gautier	Finland; Veikko Lommi; Kauko Wahlsten; Oiva Lommi; Lauri Nevalainen
Coxed four	Czechoslovakia; Karel Mejta; Jiří Havlis; Jan Jindra; Stanislav Lusk; Miroslav Koranda	Switzerland; Rico Bianchi; Karl Weidmann; Heini Scheller; Émile Ess; Walter Leiser	United States; Carl Lovsted; Al Ulbrickson; Richard Wahlstrom; Matt Leanderson; Al Rossi
eights	United States; Frank Shakespeare; William Fields; James Dunbar; Richard Murphy; Robert Detweiler; Henry Proctor; Wayne Frye; Edward Stevens; Charles Manring	Soviet Union; Yevgeny Brago; Vladimir Rodimushkin; Aleksey Komarov; Igor Borisov; Slava Amiragov; Leonid Gissen; Yevgeny Samsonov; Vladimir Kryukov; Igor Polyakov	Australia; Bob Tinning; Ernest Chapman; Nimrod Greenwood; David Anderson; Geoff Williamson; Mervyn Finlay; Edward Pain; Phil Cayzer; Tom Chessell

== Participating nations ==
A total of 404 rowers from 33 nations competed at the Helsinki Games:

- Argentina (9)
- Australia (14)
- Austria (4)
- Belgium (12)
- Brazil (3)
- Canada (15)
- Chile (1)
- Czechoslovakia (8)
- Denmark (25)
- Egypt (8)
- Finland (26)
- France (17)
- Great Britain (23)
- Germany (21)
- Greece (3)
- Hungary (15)
- Italy (26)
- Japan (5)
- Netherlands (12)
- Norway (9)
- New Zealand (5)
- Poland (10)
- Portugal (9)
- Romania (9)
- Saar (7)
- South Africa (5)
- Soviet Union (26)
- Spain (6)
- Sweden (16)
- Switzerland (13)
- United States (26)
- Uruguay (3)
- Yugoslavia (13)

== Medal table ==
Rank	Nation	Gold	Silver	Bronze	Total
1	United States	2	0	1	3
2	Soviet Union	1	2	0	3
3	France	1	1	0	2
4	Argentina	1	0	0	1
4	Czechoslovakia	1	0	0	1
4	Yugoslavia	1	0	0	1
7	Australia	0	1	1	2
7	Switzerland	0	1	1	2
9	Belgium	0	1	0	1
9	Germany	0	1	0	1
11	Denmark	0	0	1	1
11	Finland	0	0	1	1
11	Poland	0	0	1	1
11	Uruguay	0	0	1	1
Totals (14 entries)		7	7	7	21
