= Argentina at the 1952 Summer Olympics =

- IOC code: ARG
- NOC: Argentine Olympic Committee

in Helsinki
- Competitors: 123 (115 men and 8 women) in 15 sports
- Flag bearer: Delfo Cabrera
- Officials: 58
- Medals Ranked 19th: Gold 1 Silver 2 Bronze 2 Total 5

Summer Olympics appearances (overview)
- 1900; 1904; 1908; 1912; 1920; 1924; 1928; 1932; 1936; 1948; 1952; 1956; 1960; 1964; 1968; 1972; 1976; 1980; 1984; 1988; 1992; 1996; 2000; 2004; 2008; 2012; 2016; 2020; 2024

Argentina at the 1952 Summer Olympics in Helsinki, Finland was the nation's ninth appearance out of twelve editions of the Summer Olympic Games. Argentina sent to the 1952 Summer Olympics its sixth national team, under the auspices of the Argentine Olympic Committee (Comité Olímpico Argentino), 123 athletes (115 men and the 8 woman), who competed in 77 events in 15 sports They brought home five medals: 1 gold, 2 silver and 2 bronze. The flag bearer was Delfo Cabrera, the gold medalist in the immediately previous Summer Olympic Games marathon.

== Medalists ==
| Medal | Name | Sport | Event |
|---|---|---|---|
| Gold | Tranquilo Cappozzo; Eduardo Guerrero | Rowing | Men's double sculls |
| Silver | Reinaldo Gorno | Athletics | Men's Marathon |
| Silver | Antonio Pacenza | Boxing | Men's Light Heavyweight |
| Bronze | Eladio Herrera | Boxing | Men's Light Middleweight |
| Bronze | Humberto Selvetti | Weightlifting | Men's Heavyweight |

== Athletics ==
Key

- Note–Ranks given for track events are within the athlete's heat only
- Q = Qualified for the next round

Men
Track & road events

| Athlete | Event | Heat | | Quarterfinal | | Semifinal | | Final | |
| Athlete | Event | Result | Rank | Result | Rank | Result | Rank | Result | Rank |
|---|---|---|---|---|---|---|---|---|---|
| Romeo Galán | 100 m | 11.11 | 2 Q | 11.08 | 5 | Did not advance | | | |
| Mariano Acosta | 100 m | 11.58 | 6 | Did not advance | | | | | |
| Enrique Beckles | 100 m | DQ | | Did not advance | | | | | |
| Gerardo Bönnhoff | 200 m | 21.72 | 1 Q | 21.67 | 1 Q | 21.75 | 3 Q | 21.59 | 6 |
| Enrique Beckles | 200 m | 22.73 | 3 | Did not advance | | | | | |
| Romeo Galán | 200 m | DNS | | Did not advance | | | | | |
| Delfo Cabrera | 10,000 m | —N/a | | | | | | DNS | |
| Corsino Fernández | 10,000 m | —N/a | | | | | | DNS | |
| Reinaldo Gorno | 10,000 m | —N/a | | | | | | DNS | |
| Estanislao Kocourek | 110 m hurdles | 15.0 | 3 | —N/a | | Did not advance | | | |
| Mariano Acosta; Enrique Beckles; Gerardo Bönnhoff; Romeo Galán | 4 × 100 m relay | 41.5 | 3 Q | —N/a | | 41.4 | 4 | Did not advance | |
| Reinaldo Gorno | Marathon | —N/a | | | | | | 2:25:35.0 | 2nd place, silver medalist(s) |
| Delfo Cabrera | Marathon | —N/a | | | | | | 2:26:42.4 | 6 |
| Corsino Fernández | Marathon | —N/a | | | | | | DNF | |
| Guillermo Weller | 50 km walk | —N/a | | | | | | DNF | |

Field events

| Athlete | Event | Qualification | | Final | |
| Athlete | Event | Result | Rank | Result | Rank |
|---|---|---|---|---|---|
| Ricardo Héber | Javelin throw | 64.82 | 12 | 62.82 | 15 |

Women
Track & road events

| Athlete | Event | Heat | | Quarterfinal | | Semifinal | | Final | |
| Athlete | Event | Result | Rank | Result | Rank | Result | Rank | Result | Rank |
|---|---|---|---|---|---|---|---|---|---|
| Lilian Heinz | 100 m | 12.7 | 3 | Did not advance | | | | | |
| Lilián Buglia | 100 m | 12.3 | 3 | Did not advance | | | | | |
| Ana María Fontán | 100 m | 12.9 | 5 | Did not advance | | | | | |
| Gladys Erbetta | 200 m | 25.6 | 4 | —N/a | | Did not advance | | | |
| Lilian Heinz | 200 m | 25.8 | 4 | —N/a | | Did not advance | | | |
| Lilián Buglia | 200 m | DNS | | —N/a | | Did not advance | | | |
| Lilian Buglia; Gladys Erbetta; Ana María Fontán; Lilian Heinz | 4 × 100 m relay | 47.9 | 3 | —N/a | | | | Did not advance | |

Field events

| Athlete | Event | Qualification | | Final | |
| Athlete | Event | Result | Rank | Result | Rank |
|---|---|---|---|---|---|
| Gladys Erbetta | Long jump | 5.51 | 12 | 5.47 | 18 |
| Lilián Buglia | Long jump | 5.25 | 27 | Did not advance | |
| Ingeborg Pfüller | Shot put | 11.85 | 15 | Did not advance | |
| Ingeborg Mello | Shot put | 10.82 | 19 | Did not advance | |
| Ingeborg Mello | Discus throw | 40.91 | 5 | 39.04 | 12 |
| Ingeborg Pfüller | Discus throw | 36.61 | 16 | 41.73 | 7 |

== Basketball ==
Men's Team Competition

- Main Round (Group C)
  - Defeated Philippines (85-59)
  - Defeated Canada (82-81)
  - Defeated Brazil (72-56)
- Final Round (Group A)
  - Defeated Bulgaria (100-56)
  - Defeated France (61-52)
  - Lost to Uruguay (65-66)
- Semifinals
  - Lost to United States (76-85)
- Bronze Medal Match
  - Lost to Uruguay (59-68) → Fourth place
- Team Roster
  - Leopoldo Contarbio
  - Oscar Furlong
  - Juan Gazsó
  - Ricardo González
  - Rafael Lledó
  - Alberto López
  - Rubén Menini
  - Omar Monza
  - Rubén Pagliari
  - Raúl Pérez Varela
  - Ignacio Poletti
  - Juan Uder
  - Hugo del Vecchio
  - Roberto Viau

== Cycling ==
Track Competition

Men's 1.000m Time Trial

- Clodomiro Cortoni
  - Final — 1:13.2 (→ 4th place)

Men's 1.000m Sprint Scratch Race

- Antonio Giménez — 7th place

== Fencing ==
Men's foil

- Fulvio Galimi
- Félix Galimi
- José Rodríguez

Men's team foil

- Fulvio Galimi, José Rodríguez, Eduardo Sastre, Félix Galimi, Santiago Massini

Men's épée

- Vito Simonetti
- Santiago Massini
- Enrique Rettberg

Men's sabre

- Daniel Sande
- José D'Andrea
- Edgardo Pomini

Men's team sabre

- Félix Galimi, José D'Andrea, Edgardo Pomini, Daniel Sande, Fulvio Galimi

Women's foil

- Elsa Irigoyen

== Modern pentathlon ==
Three male pentathletes represented Argentina in 1952.

Individual

- Luis Ribera
- Carlos Velázquez
- Jorge Cáceres

Team

- Luis Ribera
- Carlos Velázquez
- Jorge Cáceres

== Rowing ==
Argentina had nine male rowers participate in three out of seven rowing events in 1952.

Men's double sculls

- Tranquilo Cappozzo
- Eduardo Guerrero

Men's coxless pair

- Alberto Madero
- Óscar Almirón

Men's coxed four

- Juan Ecker
- Roberto Suárez
- Alfredo Czerner
- Jorge Schneider
- Jorge Arripe (cox)

== Sailing ==
Open

| Athlete | Event | Race | | | | | | | | | | | | | | Final rank | |
| Athlete | Event | 1 | | 2 | | 3 | | 4 | | 5 | | 6 | | 7 | | Final rank | |
| Athlete | Event | Score | Rank | Score | Rank | Score | Rank | Score | Rank | Score | Rank | Score | Rank | Score | Rank | Score | Rank |
|---|---|---|---|---|---|---|---|---|---|---|---|---|---|---|---|---|---|
| Carlos Miguel Benn Pott | Finn | 22 | 206 | 25 | 150 | DNF | 0 | 24 | 168 | 24 | 168 | 22 | 206 | 22 | 206 | 1104 | 25 |
| Jorge Emilio Brauer; Alfredo Vallebona | Star | 10 | 423 | 19 | 144 | DNF | 0 | 13 | 309 | 11 | 382 | 11 | 382 | 17 | 193 | 1833 | 16 |
| Roberto Sieburger; Jorge del Río Sálas; H. Campi | Dragon | 7 | 486 | 2 | 1030 | 2 | 1030 | 4 | 729 | 2 | 1030 | 2 | 1030 | 7 | 486 | 5335 | 4 |
| Rodolfo Albino Vollenweider; Tomas Galfrascoli; Ludovico Enrique Kempter | 5.5 Metre | 3 | 828 | 9 | 351 | 4 | 703 | 7 | 460 | 2 | 1004 | 7 | 460 | 6 | 527 | 3982 | 5 |
| Rufino Rodríguez de la Torre; Enrique Sieburger, Sr. Werner von Foerster; Horacio Monti; Hércules Morini | 6 Metre | 6 | 364 | 2 | 841 | 4 | 540 | 6 | 364 | 5 | 443 | 2 | 841 | 8 | 239 | 3393 | 5 |

== Shooting ==
Seven shooters represented Argentina in 1952.

25 m pistol

- Carlos Enrique Díaz Sáenz Valiente
- Oscar Cervo

50 m pistol

- Carlos Choque

300 m rifle, three positions

- Pablo Cagnasso
- David Schiaffino

Trap

- Juan de Giacomo
- Fulvio Rocchi

== Swimming ==
Men

Ranks given are within the heat.

| Athlete | Event | Heat | | Semifinal | | Final | |
| Athlete | Event | Time | Rank | Time | Rank | Time | Rank |
|---|---|---|---|---|---|---|---|
| Marcelo Trabucco | 100 m freestyle | 1:01.5 | 4 | Did not advance | | | |
| Federico Zwanck | 100 m freestyle | 1:01.2 | =4 | Did not advance | | | |
| Carlos Alberto Bonacich | 400 m freestyle | 5:06.3 | 4 | Did not advance | | | |
| Alfredo Yantorno | 400 m freestyle | 4:54.5 | 4 Q | | | Did not advance | |
| Federico Zwanck | 400 m freestyle | 4:56.4 | 5 | Did not advance | | | |
| Pedro Galvão | 100 m backstroke | 1:08.1 | 1 Q | | | 1:07.7 | 5 |
| Orlando Cossani | 200 m breaststroke | 2:39.6 | 2 Q | 2:43.1 | 7 | Did not advance | |
| Federico Zwanck; Marcelo Trabucco; Pedro Galvão; Alfredo Yantorno | 4 × 200 m freestyle relay | 8:59.3 | 3 Q | —N/a | | 8:56.9 | 8 |

Women

Ranks given are within the heat.

| Athlete | Event | Heat | | Semifinal | | Final | |
| Athlete | Event | Time | Rank | Time | Rank | Time | Rank |
|---|---|---|---|---|---|---|---|
| Ana María Schultz | 100 m freestyle | 1:10.6 | 3 | Did not advance | | | |
| Ana María Schultz | 400 m freestyle | 5:26.1 | 1 Q | 5:22.0 | 3 Q | 5:24.0 | 7 |
