= Czechoslovakia at the 1952 Summer Olympics =

- IOC code: TCH
- NOC: Czechoslovak Olympic Committee

in Helsinki
- Competitors: 99 (86 men, 13 women) in 11 sports
- Flag bearer: Vít Matlocha
- Medals Ranked 6th: Gold 7 Silver 3 Bronze 3 Total 13

Summer Olympics appearances (overview)
- 1920; 1924; 1928; 1932; 1936; 1948; 1952; 1956; 1960; 1964; 1968; 1972; 1976; 1980; 1984; 1988; 1992

Other related appearances
- Bohemia (1900–1912); Czech Republic (1994–pres.); Slovakia (1994–pres.)

Czechoslovakia competed at the 1952 Summer Olympics in Helsinki, Finland. 99 competitors, 86 men and 13 women, took part in 70 events in 11 sports.

== Medalists ==
Medal	Name	Sport	Event
Gold	Emil Zátopek	Athletics	Men's 5000 metres
Gold	Emil Zátopek	Athletics	Men's 10000 metres
Gold	Emil Zátopek	Athletics	Men's Marathon
Gold	Dana Zátopková	Athletics	Women's javelin throw
Gold	Ján Zachara	Boxing	Men's featherweight
Gold	Josef Holeček	Canoeing	Men's C-1 1000 m
Gold	Karel Mejta; Jiří Havlis; Jan Jindra; Stanislav Lusk; Miroslav Koranda	Rowing	Men's coxed four
Silver	Josef Doležal	Athletics	Men's 50 km walk
Silver	Jan Brzák-Felix; Bohumil Kudrna	Canoeing	Men's C-2 1000 m
Silver	Josef Růžička	Wrestling	Men's Greco-Roman heavyweight
Bronze	Alfréd Jindra	Canoeing	Men's C-1 10000 m
Bronze	Hana Bobková; Alena Chadimová; Jana Rabasová; Alena Reichová; Matylda Matoušková-Šínová; Božena Srncová; Věra Vančurová; Eva Věchtová	Gymnastics	Women's team all-around
Bronze	Mikuláš Athanasov	Wrestling	Men's Greco-Roman lightweight

== Basketball ==
Men's Team Competition

- Main Round (Group A)
  - Lost to Uruguay (51-53)
  - Lost to United States (47-72)
  - Defeated Hungary (63-39) → did not advance, 12th place
- Team Roster
  - Miroslav Baumruk
  - Zdeněk Bobrovský
  - Josef Ezr
  - Jiří Matoušek
  - Miroslav Škeřík
  - Mcheq Kodl
  - Jan Kozák
  - Evžen Horňák
  - Zdeněk Rylich
  - Lubomir Kolár
  - Ivan Mrázek
  - Jaroslav Šíp

== Cycling ==
Road Competition

Men's Individual Road Race (190.4 km)

- Jan Veselý — did not finish (→ no ranking)
- Karel Nesl — did not finish (→ no ranking)
- Milan Perič — did not finish (→ no ranking)
- Stanislav Svoboda — did not finish (→ no ranking)

Track Competition

Men's 1.000m Time Trial

- Ladislav Fouček
  - Final — 1:15.2 (→ 12th place)

Men's 1.000m Sprint Scratch Race

- Zdenek Košta — 18th place

== Rowing ==
Czechoslovakia had eight male rowers participate in three out of seven rowing events in 1952.

Men's single sculls

- František Reich

Men's double sculls

- Antonín Malinkovič
- Jiří Vykoukal

Men's coxed four

- Karel Mejta
- Jiří Havlis
- Jan Jindra
- Stanislav Lusk
- Miroslav Koranda (cox)

== Shooting ==
Six shooters represented Czechoslovakia in 1952.

25 m pistol

- Ladislav Ondřej
- Zlatko Poláček

50 m pistol

- František Maxa
- Miroslav Proft

Trap

- František Čapek
- Igor Treybal

== Swimming ==
Men

Ranks given are within the heat.

Athlete	Event	Heat		Semifinal		Final	
Athlete	Event	Time	Rank	Time	Rank	Time	Rank
Ladislav Bačík	100 m backstroke	1:10.2	4	Did not advance			
Ľudovít Komadel	200 m breaststroke	2:38.9	1 Q	2:38.8	2 Q	2:40.1	8
Vlastimil Linhart	200 m breaststroke	2:48.0	6	Did not advance			
Vladimír Skovajsa	200 m breaststroke	2:53.3	7	Did not advance			
