= Rowing at the 1952 Summer Olympics – Men's coxed four =

Men's coxed four at the Games of the XV Olympiad
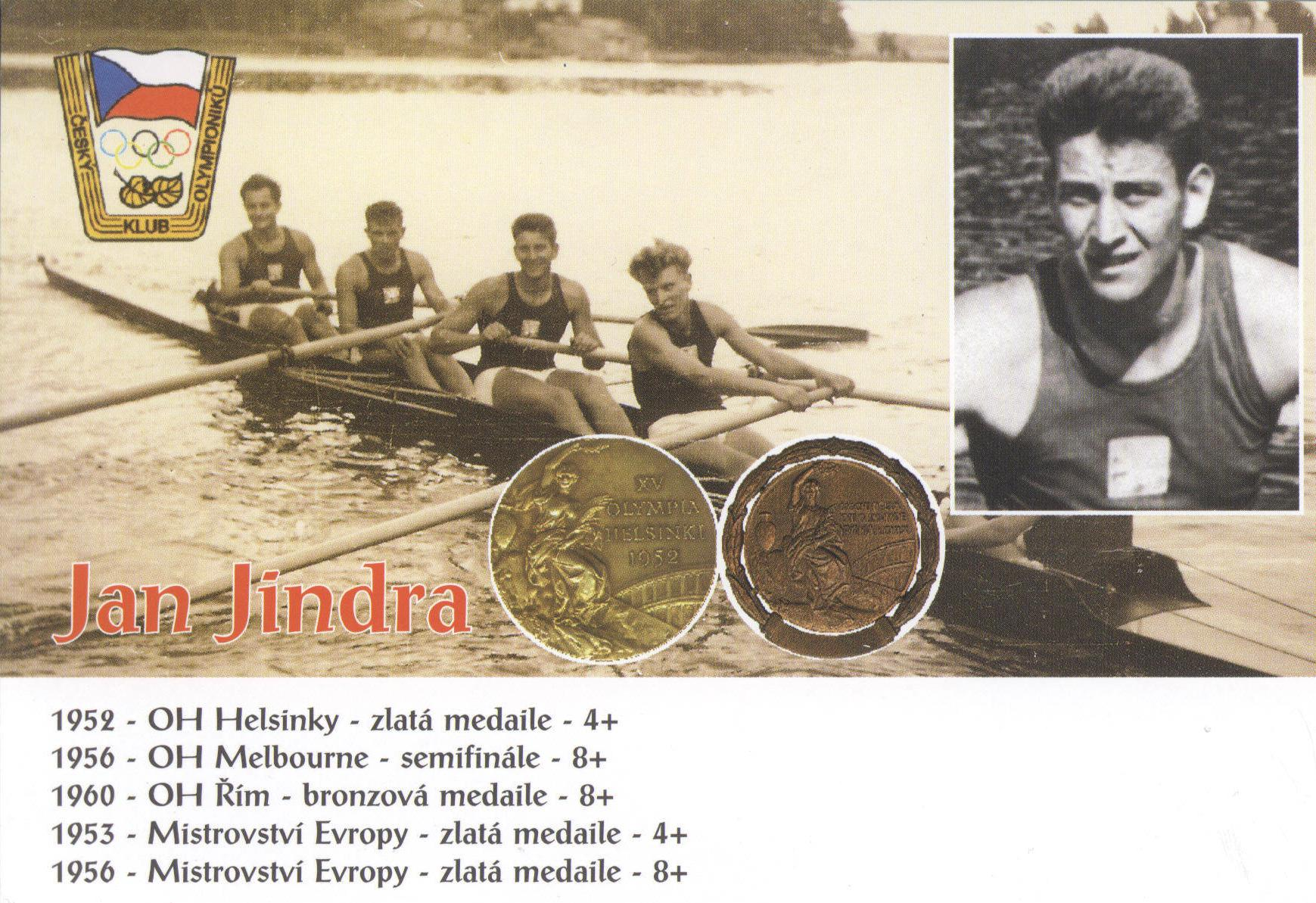
- Commemorative postcard featuring Jan Jindra
- Venue: Mei Bay, Helsinki
- Dates: 20–23 July 1952
- Competitors: 85 from 17 nations
- Winning time: 7:33.4

Medalists
1st place, gold medalist(s)		Czechoslovakia: Karel Mejta Sr; Jiří Havlis; Jan Jindra; Stanislav Lusk; Miroslav Koranda (cox)
2nd place, silver medalist(s)		Switzerland: Rico Bianchi; Karl Weidmann; Heini Scheller; Émile Ess; Walter Leiser (cox)
3rd place, bronze medalist(s)		United States: Carl Lovsted; Al Ulbrickson; Richard Wahlstrom; Matt Leanderson; Al Rossi (cox)

The men's coxed four competition at the 1952 Summer Olympics took place at Mei Bay, Helsinki, Finland. It was held from 20 to 23 July and was won by the team from Czechoslovakia. There were 17 boats (85 competitors) from 17 nations, with each nation limited to a single boat in the event. The gold medal was Czechoslovakia's first medal in the men's coxed four. Switzerland earned its third consecutive silver medal, and sixth medal in seven Games dating back to 1920 (the only Games in that time where the Swiss team did not win a medal was 1932, when no Swiss boat competed). The reigning champion United States took bronze.

== Background ==
This was the ninth appearance of the event. Rowing had been on the programme in 1896 but was cancelled due to bad weather. The coxed four was one of the four initial events introduced in 1900. It was not held in 1904 or 1908, but was held at every Games from 1912 to 1992 when it (along with the men's coxed pair) was replaced with the men's lightweight double sculls and men's lightweight coxless four.

The Italian team was regarded as the slight favourite for the event; they had won gold at the European Rowing Championships in 1949, silver in 1950, and gold again in 1951, with the team having changed between competitions. Of the New Zealand team that had won the 1950 British Empire Games, three rowers were in the 1952 Olympic event: Ted Johnson, John O'Brien, and Colin Johnstone. The Danish team was made up of the 1950 European Rowing Championships winners: Niels Kristensen, Ove Nielsen, Peter Hansen, Bent Blach Petersen, and Eivin Kristensen. The New Zealand and Italian team met in the repechage and New Zealand was eliminated. The Czechoslovak team dominated the competition and won every round. In the final, they defeated the Swizz quad, while the team from the USA—the winners of the 1948 Olympic competition—won bronze.

Egypt and the Soviet Union each made their debut in the event. France and the United States both made their seventh appearance, tied for most among nations to that point.

== Competition format ==
The coxed four event featured five-person boats, with four rowers and a coxswain. It was a sweep rowing event, with the rowers each having one oar (and thus each rowing on one side). The competition used the 2000 metres distance that became standard at the 1912 Olympics and which has been used ever since except at the 1948 Games.

Based on a previous decision, each boat raced a minimum of two races before it could be eliminated.

The competition featured five rounds (three main rounds and two repechages).

- Quarterfinals: 4 heats, 4 or 5 boats each, top 2 in each heat (8 total) advanced to the semifinals while others (9 boats) went to the first repechage.
- First repechage: 3 heats, 3 boats each, top 1 in each heat (3 total) advanced to the second repechage (not the semifinals) while all others (6 boats) were eliminated.
- Semifinals: 2 heats, 4 boats each, top 1 in each heat (2 total) advanced to the final while all others (6 boats) went to the second repechage.
- Second repechage: 3 heats, 3 boats each, to 1 in each heat (3 total) advanced to the final while all others (6 boats) were eliminated.
- Final: 1 heat, 5 boats, determining medals and 4th and 5th places.

== Schedule ==
All times are Eastern European Summer Time (UTC+3)

Date	Time	Round
Monday, 21 July 1952	9:00; 9:00; 16:00	Quarterfinals; First repechage Semifinals
Tuesday, 22 July 1952	9:00	Second repechage
Wednesday, 23 July 1952	16:00	Final

== Results ==
=== Quarterfinals ===
Four heats were rowed on 20 July. Three of the heats had four teams and one had five teams, with the first two teams to qualify for the semifinals, and the remaining teams progressing to the round one repechage.

==== Quarterfinal 1 ====
Rank	Rowers	Coxswain	Nation	Time	Notes
1	André Goursolle; Robert Texier; Guy Nosbaum; Claude Martin	Didier Moureau	France	7:18.4	Q
2	Kirill Putyrsky; Yevgeny Tretnikov; Georgy Gushchenko; Boris Fyodorov	Boris Brechko	Soviet Union	7:19.9	Q
3	Albino Trevisan; Amadeo Scarpi; Abbondio Smerghetto; Tarquinio Angiolin	Domenico Cambieri	Italy	7:20.5	R
4	Salvador Costa; Miguel Palau; Francisco Gironella; Pedro Massana	Luis Omedes	Spain	7:25.5	R
—	Kurt Grönholm; Paul Stråhlman; Birger Karlsson; Karl-Erik Johansson	Antero Tukiainen	Finland	DNF	R

==== Quarterfinal 2 ====
Rank	Rowers	Coxswain	Nation	Time	Notes
1	Carl Lovsted; Al Ulbrickson; Richard Wahlstrom; Matt Leanderson	Al Rossi	United States	7:17.9	Q
2	John MacMillan; Graham Fisk; Laurence Guest; Peter de Giles	Paul Massey	Great Britain	7:18.3	Q
3	Niels Kristensen; Ove Nielsen; Peter Hansen; Bent Blach Petersen	Eivin Kristensen	Denmark	7:33.9	R
4	Ibrahim El-Attar; Mohamed El-Sahrawi; Mamdooh El-Attar; Mohamed El-Sayed	Albert Selim El-Mankabadi	Egypt	7:52.8	R

==== Quarterfinal 3 ====
Rank	Rowers	Coxswain	Nation	Time	Notes
1	Karel Mejta Sr; Jiří Havlis; Jan Jindra; Stanislav Lusk	Miroslav Koranda	Czechoslovakia	7:16.6	Q
2	Bjørn Christoffersen; Arnfinn Larsen; Wilhelm Hayden; Thor Nilsen	Leif Andersen	Norway	7:21.6	Q
3	Ton Fontani; Han Heijenbrock; Jan Willem Pennink; Jaap Beije	Hans Caro	Netherlands	7:24.9	R
4	Kosuke Matsuo; Ryuji Goto; Kazuo Kanda; Toshiya Takeuchi	Tamatsu Kogure	Japan	7:29.8	R

==== Quarterfinal 4 ====
Rank	Rowers	Coxswain	Nation	Time	Notes
1	Rico Bianchi; Karl Weidmann; Heini Scheller; Émile Ess	Walter Leiser	Switzerland	7:20.7	Q
2	Juan Ecker; Roberto Suárez; Alfredo Czerner; Jorge Schneider	Jorge Arripe	Argentina	7:24.4	Q
3	Günter Twiesselmann; Klaus Schulze; Heinz Beyer; Gerd Vogeley	Hans Joachim Wiemken	Germany	7:24.8	R
4	Ted Johnson; John O'Brien; Kerry Ashby; Bill Tinnock	Colin Johnstone	New Zealand	7:25.2	R

=== First repechage ===
Three heats were rowed in the round one repechage on 21 July, with the first team to qualify for the semi-final repechage.

==== First repechage heat 1 ====
Rank	Rowers	Coxswain	Nation	Time	Notes
1	Albino Trevisan; Amadeo Scarpi; Abbondio Smerghetto; Tarquinio Angiolin	Domenico Cambieri	Italy	7:06.0	Q
2	Ted Johnson; John O'Brien; Kerry Ashby; Bill Tinnock	Colin Johnstone	New Zealand	7:07.3	
3	Kosuke Matsuo; Ryuji Goto; Kazuo Kanda; Toshiya Takeuchi	Tamatsu Kogure	Japan	7:13.9	

==== First repechage heat 2 ====
Rank	Rowers	Coxswain	Nation	Time	Notes
1	Niels Kristensen; Ove Nielsen; Peter Hansen; Bent Blach Petersen	Eivin Kristensen	Denmark	7:03.4	Q
2	Günter Twiesselmann; Klaus Schulze; Heinz Beyer; Gerd Vogeley	Hans Joachim Wiemken	Germany	7:04.6	
3	Salvador Costa; Miguel Palau; Francisco Gironella; Pedro Massana	Luis Omedes	Spain	7:06.9	

==== First repechage heat 3 ====
Rank	Rowers	Coxswain	Nation	Time	Notes
1	Kurt Grönholm; Paul Stråhlman; Birger Karlsson; Karl-Erik Johansson	Antero Tukiainen	Finland	7:00.7	Q
2	Ton Fontani; Han Heijenbrock; Jan Willem Pennink; Jaap Beije	Hans Caro	Netherlands	7:04.2	
3	Ibrahim El-Attar; Mohamed El-Sahrawi; Mamdooh El-Attar; Mohamed El-Sayed	Albert Selim El-Mankabadi	Egypt	7:21.0	

=== Semifinals ===
Two heats were rowed in the semifinals on 21 July, with the first team to qualify for the final, and all other teams to progress to the semifinal repechage.

==== Semifinal 1 ====
Rank	Rowers	Coxswain	Nation	Time	Notes
1	Carl Lovsted; Al Ulbrickson; Richard Wahlstrom; Matt Leanderson	Al Rossi	United States	7:07.6	Q
2	André Goursolle; Robert Texier; Guy Nosbaum; Claude Martin	Didier Moureau	France	7:11.2	R
3	Bjørn Christoffersen; Arnfinn Larsen; Wilhelm Hayden; Thor Nilsen	Leif Andersen	Norway	7:12.6	R
4	Juan Ecker; Roberto Suárez; Alfredo Czerner; Jorge Schneider	Jorge Arripe	Argentina	7:14.6	R

==== Semifinal 2 ====
Rank	Rowers	Coxswain	Nation	Time	Notes
1	Karel Mejta Sr; Jiří Havlis; Jan Jindra; Stanislav Lusk	Miroslav Koranda	Czechoslovakia	6:58.5	Q
2	Rico Bianchi; Karl Weidmann; Heini Scheller; Émile Ess	Walter Leiser	Switzerland	6:59.2	R
3	John MacMillan; Graham Fisk; Laurence Guest; Peter de Giles	Paul Massey	Great Britain	7:04.1	R
4	Kirill Putyrsky; Yevgeny Tretnikov; Georgy Gushchenko; Boris Fyodorov	Boris Brechko	Soviet Union	7:11.6	R

=== Second repechage ===
Three heats were rowed in the semifinals repechage on 22 July, with the winning teams progressing to the final.

==== Second repechage heat 1 ====
Rank	Rowers	Coxswain	Nation	Time	Notes
1	Kurt Grönholm; Paul Stråhlman; Birger Karlsson; Karl-Erik Johansson	Antero Tukiainen	Finland	7:03.5	Q
2	Kirill Putyrsky; Yevgeny Tretnikov; Georgy Gushchenko; Boris Fyodorov	Boris Brechko	Soviet Union	7:05.1	
3	André Goursolle; Robert Texier; Guy Nosbaum; Claude Martin	Didier Moureau	France	7:09.4	

==== Second repechage heat 2 ====
Rank	Rowers	Coxswain	Nation	Time	Notes
1	Rico Bianchi; Karl Weidmann; Heini Scheller; Émile Ess	Walter Leiser	Switzerland	7:02.3	Q
2	Albino Trevisan; Amadeo Scarpi; Abbondio Smerghetto; Tarquinio Angiolin	Domenico Cambieri	Italy	7:06.0	
3	Juan Ecker; Roberto Suárez; Alfredo Czerner; Jorge Schneider	Jorge Arripe	Argentina	7:14.8	

==== Second repechage heat 3 ====
Rank	Rowers	Coxswain	Nation	Time	Notes
1	John MacMillan; Graham Fisk; Laurence Guest; Peter de Giles	Paul Massey	Great Britain	7:02.3	Q
2	Bjørn Christoffersen; Arnfinn Larsen; Wilhelm Hayden; Thor Nilsen	Leif Andersen	Norway	7:06.6	
3	Niels Kristensen; Ove Nielsen; Peter Hansen; Bent Blach Petersen	Eivin Kristensen	Denmark	7:08.6	

=== Final ===
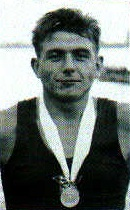
Jiri Havlis of the Czech team with his gold medal

Five teams reached the final, which was decided in one race held on 23 July. While conditions had been favourable on the first three days of racing, the day the finals were held saw wind at considerable force. This wind died down later, but the coxed four was the first race of the day and the results were affected by the strong wind.

Rank	Rowers	Coxswain	Nation	Time
1st place, gold medalist(s)	Karel Mejta Sr; Jiří Havlis; Jan Jindra; Stanislav Lusk	Miroslav Koranda	Czechoslovakia	7:33.4
2nd place, silver medalist(s)	Rico Bianchi; Karl Weidmann; Heini Scheller; Émile Ess	Walter Leiser	Switzerland	7:36.5
3rd place, bronze medalist(s)	Carl Lovsted; Al Ulbrickson; Richard Wahlstrom; Matt Leanderson	Al Rossi	United States	7:37.0
4	John MacMillan; Graham Fisk; Laurence Guest; Peter de Giles	Paul Massey	Great Britain	7:41.2
5	Kurt Grönholm; Paul Stråhlman; Birger Karlsson; Karl-Erik Johansson	Antero Tukiainen	Finland	7:43.8
