= Spain at the 1952 Summer Olympics =

- IOC code: ESP
- NOC: Spanish Olympic Committee

in Helsinki
- Competitors: 27 men in 7 sports
- Flag bearer: Luis Omedes
- Medals Ranked 34th: Gold 0 Silver 1 Bronze 0 Total 1

Summer Olympics appearances (overview)
- 1900; 1904–1912; 1920; 1924; 1928; 1932; 1936; 1948; 1952; 1956; 1960; 1964; 1968; 1972; 1976; 1980; 1984; 1988; 1992; 1996; 2000; 2004; 2008; 2012; 2016; 2020; 2024; 2028

Spain competed at the 1952 Summer Olympics in Helsinki, Finland. 27 competitors, all men, took part in 21 events in 7 sports.

== Medalists ==
=== Silver ===
- Ángel Léon – Shooting, Men's Free Pistol

== Equestrian ==
Individual eventing

- Joaquín Nogueras
- Beltrán Alfonso Osorio, 18th Duke of Alburquerque
- Fernando López

Team eventing

- Joaquín Nogueras
- Beltrán Alfonso Osorio, 18th Duke of Alburquerque
- Fernando López

Individual jumping

- Jaime García
- Manuel Ordovás
- Marcelino Gavilán

Team jumping

- Jaime García
- Manuel Ordovás
- Marcelino Gavilán

== Gymnastics ==
Men's artistic individual all-around

- Joaquín Blume

Men's floor

- Joaquín Blume

Men's horizontal bar

- Joaquín Blume

Men's parallel bars

- Joaquín Blume

Men's pommel horse

- Joaquín Blume

Men's rings

- Joaquín Blume

Men's vault

- Joaquín Blume

== Rowing ==
Spain had six male rowers participate in two out of seven rowing events in 1952.

Men's single sculls

- Juan Omedes

Men's coxed four

- Salvador Costa
- Miguel Palau
- Francisco Gironella
- Pedro Massana
- Luis Omedes (cox)

== Sailing ==
Finn

- Ramón Balcells Rodón

== Shooting ==
Four shooteres represented Spain in 1952.

Men

Athlete	Event	Final	
Athlete	Event	Points	Rank
Emilio Álava	25 m rapid fire pistol	568	13
Rafael de Juan	Trap	173	27
Ángel León	50 m pistol	550	2nd place, silver medalist(s)
Antonio Vega	Trap	164	33

== Swimming ==
Men

Ranks given are within the heat.

Athlete	Event	Heat		Semifinal		Final	
Athlete	Event	Time	Rank	Time	Rank	Time	Rank
Ricardo Conde	100 m freestyle	1:02.6	6	Did not advance			
Roberto Queralt	100 m freestyle	1:01.6	4	Did not advance			
Enrique Granados	400 m freestyle	4:53.7	4 Q			Did not advance	
Enrique Granados	1500 m freestyle	19:45.9	4	—N/a		Did not advance	

== Water polo ==
Men's team

- Leandro Ribera Abad
- Ricardo Conde
- Josep Bazán
- Roberto Queralt
- Antonio Subirana
- Agustín Mestres
- Juan Abellán
- Francisco Castillo
