= Japan at the 1952 Summer Olympics =

- IOC code: JPN
- NOC: Japanese Olympic Committee

in Helsinki
- Competitors: 69 in 11 sports
- Flag bearer: Bunkichi Sawada
- Medals Ranked 17th: Gold 1 Silver 6 Bronze 2 Total 9

Summer Olympics appearances (overview)
- 1912; 1920; 1924; 1928; 1932; 1936; 1948; 1952; 1956; 1960; 1964; 1968; 1972; 1976; 1980; 1984; 1988; 1992; 1996; 2000; 2004; 2008; 2012; 2016; 2020; 2024

Japan competed at the 1952 Summer Olympics in Helsinki, Finland. Japan returned to the Olympic Games after not being invited to the 1948 Summer Olympics because of the nations's role in World War II. 69 competitors, 58 men and 11 women, took part in 60 events in 13 sports.

== Medalists ==
Medal	Name	Sport	Event	Date
Gold	Shohachi Ishii	Wrestling	Men's freestyle bantamweight	July 23
Silver	Tadao Uesako	Gymnastics	Men's floor	July 21
Silver	Masao Takemoto	Gymnastics	Men's vault	July 21
Silver	Yushu Kitano	Wrestling	Men's freestyle flyweight	July 23
Silver	Hiroshi Suzuki	Swimming	Men's 100 m freestyle	July 27
Silver	Toru Goto; Yoshihiro Hamaguchi; Hiroshi Suzuki; Teijiro Tanikawa	Swimming	Men's 4 × 200 m freestyle relay	July 29
Silver	Shiro Hashizume	Swimming	Men's 1500 m freestyle	August 2
Bronze	Takashi Ono	Gymnastics	Men's vault	July 21
Bronze	Tadao Uesako	Gymnastics	Men's vault	July 21

Medals by sport
Sport	1st place, gold medalist(s)	2nd place, silver medalist(s)	3rd place, bronze medalist(s)	Total
Wrestling	1	1	0	2
Swimming	0	3	0	3
Gymnastics	0	2	2	4
Total	1	6	2	9

== Cycling ==
Road Competition

Men's Individual Road Race (190.4 km)

- Kihei Tomioka — did not finish (→ no ranking)
- Masazumi Tajima — did not finish (→ no ranking)
- Tadashi Kato — did not finish (→ no ranking)
- Tamotsu Chikanari — did not finish (→ no ranking)

Track Competition

Men's 1.000m Time Trial

- Tadashi Kato

- Final — 1:23.2 (→ 26th place)

Men's 1.000m Sprint Scratch Race

- Kihei Tomioka — 23rd place

== Diving ==
Men

Athlete	Event	Preliminary		Final	
Athlete	Event	Points	Rank	Points	Rank
Katsuichi Mori	3 m springboard	65.23	15	Did not advance	
Katsuichi Mori	10 m platform	58.65	29	Did not advance	

Women

Athlete	Event	Preliminary		Final	
Athlete	Event	Points	Rank	Points	Rank
Masami Miyamoto	3 m springboard	46.88	15	Did not advance	
Masami Miyamoto	10 m platform	36.24	11	Did not advance	

== Fencing ==
One fencer, Shinichi Maki, represented Japan in 1952.

Men's foil

- Shinichi Maki

Men's épée

- Shinichi Maki

Men's sabre

- Shinichi Maki

== Rowing ==
Japan had five male rowers participate in one out of seven rowing events in 1952.

Men's coxed four

- Kosuke Matsuo
- Ryuji Goto
- Kazuo Kanda
- Toshiya Takeuchi
- Tamatsu Kogure (cox)

== Shooting ==
One shooter represented Japan in 1952.

Men

Athlete	Event	Final	
Athlete	Event	Score	Rank
Yukio Inokuma	Men's 50 metre rifle prone	396	17

== Swimming ==
Men

Ranks given are within the heat.

Athlete	Event	Heat		Semifinal		Swim-off		Final	
Athlete	Event	Time	Rank	Time	Rank	Time	Rank	Time	Rank
Toru Goto	100 m freestyle	58.3	1 Q	58.3	3 QSO	58.5	1 Q	58.5	4
Yoshihiro Hamaguchi	100 m freestyle	58.0	1 Q	58.3	=3 QSO	59.1	3	Did not advance	
Hiroshi Suzuki	100 m freestyle	58.0	2 Q	58.0	2 Q	—N/a		57.4	2nd place, silver medalist(s)
Hironoshin Furuhashi	400 m freestyle	4:43.3	1 Q	4:44.2	3 Q	—N/a		4:42.1	8
Yasuo Tanaka	400 m freestyle	4:44.3	2 Q	4:44.9	2	—N/a		Did not advance	
Yoshio Tanaka	400 m freestyle	4:54.0	3 Q	4:48.0	7	—N/a		Did not advance	
Yukiyoshi Aoki	1500 m freestyle	19:27.0	3	—N/a				Did not advance	
Shiro Hashizume	1500 m freestyle	18:34.0 OR	1 Q	—N/a				18:41.4	2nd place, silver medalist(s)
Yasuo Kitamura	1500 m freestyle	19:10.3	3 Q	—N/a				19:00.4	6
Norihiko Kurahashi	100 m backstroke	1:10.7	4	Did not advance		—N/a		Did not advance	
Yasumasu Nishino	100 m backstroke	1:10.1	2	Did not advance		—N/a		Did not advance	
Nobuyasu Hirayama	200 m breaststroke	2:41.5	3 Q	2:39.1	3 Q	—N/a		2:37.4	4
Takayoshi Kajikawa	200 m breaststroke	2:39.6	3 Q	2:37.3	2 Q	—N/a		2:38.6	5
Jiro Nagasawa	200 m breaststroke	2:40.4	2 Q	2:39.0	4 Q	—N/a		2:39.1	6
Hiroshi Suzuki; Yoshihiro Hamaguchi; Toru Goto; Teijiro Tanikawa	4 × 200 m freestyle	8:42.1	1 Q	—N/a				8:33.5	2nd place, silver medalist(s)

Women

Ranks given are within the heat.

Athlete	Event	Heat		Semifinal		Final	
Athlete	Event	Time	Rank	Time	Rank	Time	Rank
Shizue Miyabe	100 m freestyle	1:16.6	7	Did not advance			
Fumiko Sakaguchi	100 m freestyle	1:14.6	5	Did not advance			
Sadako Yamashita	100 m freestyle	1:13.2	6	Did not advance			
Misako Tamura	400 m freestyle	5:59.0	7	Did not advance			
Sadako Yamashita	400 m freestyle	5:48.4	7	Did not advance			
Masayo Aoki	200 m breaststroke	3:05.6	5	Did not advance			
Kazuko Sakamoto	200 m breaststroke	3:02.7	3 Q	3:04.2	7	Did not advance	
Yasuko Oishi; Fumiko Sakaguchi; Misako Tamura; Sadako Yamashita	4 × 100 m freestyle	4:54.0 NR	6	—N/a		Did not advance	

== See also ==
- Japan at the 1951 Asian Games
