= Netherlands at the 1952 Summer Olympics =

- Flag of the Netherlands
- IOC code: NED
- NOC: Dutch Olympic Committee

in Helsinki
- Flag bearer: Simon de Wit
- Medals Ranked 29th: Gold 0 Silver 5 Bronze 0 Total 5

Summer Olympics appearances (overview)
- 1900; 1904; 1908; 1912; 1920; 1924; 1928; 1932; 1936; 1948; 1952; 1956; 1960; 1964; 1968; 1972; 1976; 1980; 1984; 1988; 1992; 1996; 2000; 2004; 2008; 2012; 2016; 2020; 2024; 2028

Other related appearances
- 1906 Intercalated Games

Athletes from the Netherlands competed at the 1952 Summer Olympics in Helsinki, Finland.

== Medalists ==
=== Silver ===
- Bertha Brouwer — Athletics, Women's 200 metres
- Jules Ancion, André Boerstra, Harry Derckx, Han Drijver, Dick Esser, Roepie Kruize, Dick Loggere, Lau Mulder, Eddy Tiel, Wim van Heel, and Henk Wery — Field Hockey, Men's Team Competition
- Hannie Termeulen — Swimming, Women's 100m Freestyle
- Geertje Wielema — Swimming, Women's 100m Backstroke
- Irma Heijting-Schuhmacher, Hannie Termeulen, Marie-Louise Linssen-Vaessen and Koosje van Voorn — Swimming, Women's 4 × 100 m Freestyle Relay

== Results by event ==
=== Boxing ===
Men's Flyweight (–51 kg)

- Hein van der Zee
  1. First Round — Lost to Anatoli Bulakov (Soviet Union) on points (0-3)

Men's Light Welterweight (–63,5 kg)

- Piet van Klaveren
  1. First Round — Defeated Roy Keenan (Canada) on points (2-1)
  2. Second Round — Lost to Terence Milligan (Ireland) on points (0-3)

Men's Welterweight (–67 kg)

- Moos Linneman
  1. First Round — Defeated Peter Müller (Germany) by walk-over in third round
  2. Second Round — Defeated George Issabeg (Iran) on points (2-1)
  3. Quarterfinals — Lost to Günther Heidemann (Germany) on points (0-3)

Men's Middleweight (–75 kg)

- Leen Jansen
  1. First Round — Bye
  2. Second Round — Defeated Robert Malouf (Canada) on technical knock-out in first round
  3. Quarterfinals — Lost to Floyd Patterson (United States) on knock-out in first round

Men's Light Heavyweight (–81 kg)

- Toon Pastor
  1. First Round — Defeated István Fazekas (Hungary) on points (3-0)
  2. Second Round — Lost to Karl Kistner (Germany) on points (1-2)

=== Cycling ===
==== Road Competition ====
Men's Individual Road Race (190.4 km)

- Arend van 't Hoft — 5:11:19.0 (→ 10th place)
- Jan Plantaz — 5:16:19.1 (→ 22nd place)
- Adrie Voorting — 5:24:44.6 (→ 49th place)
- Jules Maenen — did not finish (→ no ranking)

==== Track Competition ====
Men's 1.000m Time Trial

- Johan Hijzelendoorn

- Final — 1:14.5 (→ 8th place)

Men's 1.000m Sprint Scratch Race

- Johan Hijzelendoorn — 9th place

Men's 4.000m Team Pursuit

- Adrie Voorting, Daan de Groot, Jan Plantaz, and Jules Maenen

- Eliminated in quarterfinals (→ 7th place)

=== Diving ===
Women

Athlete	Event	Preliminary		Final	
Athlete	Event	Points	Rank	Points	Rank
Els van den Horn	3 m springboard	49.44	12	Did not advance	
Lenie Lanting-Keller	3 m springboard	47.33	14	Did not advance	

=== Rowing ===
Netherlands had 12 male rowers participate in four out of seven rowing events in 1952.

Men's single sculls

- Rob van Mesdag

Men's coxless pair

- Ben Binnendijk
- Carl Kuntze

Men's coxless four

- Frits de Voogt
- Ruud Sesink Clee
- Jan op den Velde
- Kees van Vugt

Men's coxed four

- Ton Fontani
- Han Heijenbrock
- Jan Willem Pennink
- Jaap Beije
- Hans Caro (cox)

=== Swimming ===
Men

Ranks given are within the heat.

Athlete	Event	Heat		Semifinal		Final	
Athlete	Event	Time	Rank	Time	Rank	Time	Rank
Joris Tjebbes	100 m freestyle	59.1	2 Q	59.8	5	Did not advance	
Joris Tjebbes	400 m freestyle	4:54.4	3 Q	5:01.9	8	Did not advance	
Jitse van der Veen	100 m backstroke	1:09.1	4 Q	1:10.5	8	Did not advance	
Daan Buijze	200 m breaststroke	2:41.9	2 Q	2:42.6	6	Did not advance	

Women

Ranks given are within the heat.

Athlete	Event	Heat		Semifinal		Final	
Athlete	Event	Time	Rank	Time	Rank	Time	Rank
Irma Heijting-Schuhmacher	100 m freestyle	1:06.7	1 Q	1:06.7	2 Q	1:07.3	6
Hannie Termeulen	100 m freestyle	1:07.3	1 Q	1:07.1	3 Q	1:07.0	2nd place, silver medalist(s)
Koosje van Voorn	100 m freestyle	1:07.4	2 Q	1:08.1	5	Did not advance	
Irma Heijting-Schuhmacher	400 m freestyle	5:45.2	6	Did not advance			
Hannie Termeulen	400 m freestyle	5:45.5	5	Did not advance			
Geertje Wielema	400 m freestyle	6:02.6	6	Did not advance			
Ria van der Horst	100 m backstroke	1:17.0	1 Q	—N/a		DSQ	
Joke de Korte	100 m backstroke	1:15.8	2 Q	—N/a		1:15.8	4
Geertje Wielema	100 m backstroke	1:13.8	1 Q	—N/a		1:14.5	2nd place, silver medalist(s)
Lies Bonnier	200 m breaststroke	3:00.6	1 Q	3:00.3	5	Did not advance	
Rika Bruins	200 m breaststroke	3:04.7	3 Q	3:02.4	6	Did not advance	
Nel Garritsen	200 m breaststroke	2:59.4	2 Q	2:59.5	3 Q	3:02.1	8
Marie-Louise Linssen-Vaessen; Koosje van Voorn; Hannie Termeulen; Irma Heijting-Schuhmacher	4 × 100 m freestyle	4:30.6	2 Q	—N/a		4:29.0	2nd place, silver medalist(s)

=== Water Polo ===
==== Men's team competition ====
- Qualifying Round

- Defeated Soviet Union (3:2)

- Preliminary Round (Group C)

- Defeated Argentina (9:3)
- Defeated Sweden (7:1)
- Defeated Yugoslavia (3:2)

- Last match was replayed after a protest by the Yugoslavs against one of the referees; The Netherlands lost the replay (1:2) on August 1, 1952.

- Semi Final (Group F)

- Tied with Hungary (4:4)
- Defeated Soviet Union (4:2)

- Classification Matches

- Defeated Belgium (5:3)
- Defeated Spain (7:1) → Fifth place

- Team Roster

- Gerrit Bijlsma
- Cor Braasem
- Joop Cabout
- Ruud van Feggelen
- Max van Gelder
- Nijs Korevaar
- Frits Smol
