= Norway at the 1952 Summer Olympics =

- IOC code: NOR
- NOC: Norwegian Sports Federation

in Helsinki, Finland 19 July – 3 August
- Competitors: 102 (96 men, 6 women) in 14 sports
- Flag bearer: Martin Stokken (athletics)
- Medals Ranked 10th: Gold 3 Silver 2 Bronze 0 Total 5

Summer Olympics appearances (overview)
- 1900; ~~1904~~; 1908; 1912; 1920; 1924; 1928; 1932; 1936; 1948; 1952; 1956; 1960; 1964; 1968; 1972; 1976; 1980; 1984; 1988; 1992; 1996; 2000; 2004; 2008; 2012; 2016; 2020; 2024; 2028

Other related appearances
- 1906 Intercalated Games

Norway competed at the 1952 Summer Olympics in Helsinki, Finland. 102 competitors, 96 men and 6 women, took part in 72 events in 14 sports. Earlier in the year, Norway had hosted the 1952 Winter Olympics in Oslo.

== Cycling ==
Road Competition

Men's Individual Road Race (190.4 km)

- Odd Berg – 5:17:30.2 (→ 24th place)
- Erling Kristiansen – 5:11:16.5 (→ 25th place)
- Lorang Christiansen – 5:20:01.3 (→ 28th place)

== Fencing ==
Five fencers, all male, represented Norway in 1952.

Men's foil

- Leif Klette

Men's épée

- Johan von Koss
- Egill Knutzen
- Alfred Eriksen

Men's team épée

- Egill Knutzen, Alfred Eriksen, Johan von Koss, Sverre Gillebo

Men's sabre

- Alfred Eriksen

== Rowing ==
Norway had nine male rowers participate in two out of seven rowing events in 1952.

Men's coxless four

- Sverre Kråkenes
- Kristoffer Lepsøe
- Thorstein Kråkenes
- Harald Kråkenes

Men's coxed four

- Bjørn Christoffersen
- Arnfinn Larsen
- Wilhelm Hayden
- Thor Nilsen
- Leif Andersen (cox)

== Shooting ==
Nine shooters represented Norway in 1952. Erling Kongshaug won gold in the 50 m rifle, three positions and John H. Larsen, Sr. won gold in the 100m running deer.

25 m pistol

- Gunnar Svendsen
- Oddvar Wenner Nilssen

50 m pistol

- Gunnar Svendsen
- Rolf Klementsen

300 m rifle, three positions

- Erling Kongshaug
- Mauritz Amundsen

50 m rifle, three positions

- Erling Kongshaug
- Mauritz Amundsen

50 m rifle, prone

- Erling Kongshaug
- Mauritz Amundsen

100m running deer

- John H. Larsen, Sr.
- Rolf Bergersen

Trap

- Hans Aasnæs
- Svein Helling

== Swimming ==
Men

Ranks given are within the heat.

Athlete	Event	Heat		Semifinal		Final	
Athlete	Event	Time	Rank	Time	Rank	Time	Rank
Per Olsen	100 m freestyle	1:02.1	5	Did not advance			
Per Olsen	400 m freestyle	5:08.6	5	Did not advance			
Roar Woldum	400 m freestyle	5:14.4	4	Did not advance			
Roar Woldum	1500 m freestyle	21:19.5	7	—N/a		Did not advance	
Tom Pettersen	100 m backstroke	1:15.4	7	Did not advance			
