= 1952 Summer Olympics Parade of Nations =

During the Parade of Nations section of the 1952 Summer Olympics opening ceremony, athletes from each country participating in the Olympics paraded into the arena. The Parade of Nations was organized according to the Finnish name of the country. Greece led the parade followed by the Netherlands Antilles. Other countries marched by following the Finnish alphabet, except the host country, Finland, which marched last. The athletes from British Guiana and the People's Republic of China were absent from the Parade of Nations, meaning only 67 nations participated in the parade. British Guiana should’ve marched between Brazil and Bulgaria, while the People’s Republic of China should’ve marched between Canada and Korea.

== List ==
Order	Nation	Finnish	Flag bearer	Sport
1	Greece	Kreikka	Nikolaos Syllas	Athletics
2	Netherlands Antilles	Alank Antillit	Ergilio Hato	Football
3	Argentina	Argentina	Delfo Cabrera	Athletics
4	Australia	Australia	Mervyn Wood	Rowing
5	Bahamas	Bahama	Durward Knowles	Sailing
6	Belgium	Belgia	Charles Debeur	Official
7	Bermuda	Bermuda	Chummy Hayward	Official
8	Brazil	Brasilia	Mário Jorge	Basketball
9	Bulgaria	Bulgaria	Boris Nikolov	Boxing
10	Burma	Burma		
11	Ceylon	Ceylon		
12	Chile	Chile	Adriana Millard	Athletics
13	Egypt	Egypti	Ahmed Fouad Nessim	Water polo
14	Spain	Espanja	Luis Omedes	Rowing
15	South Africa	Etelä-Afrikka	Schalk Booysen	Athletics
16	Philippines	Filippiinit	Ramon Campos Jr.	Basketball
17	Guatemala	Guatemala	Doroteo Flores	Athletics
18	Netherlands	Hollanti	Simon de Wit	Official
19	Hong Kong	Hongkong		Team official
20	Indonesia	Indonesia	Habib Suharko	Swimming
21	India	Intia	Balbir Singh Sr.	Field hockey
22	Iran	Iran	Mahmoud Namjoo	Weightlifting
23	Ireland	Irlanti	Paddy Carroll	Official
24	Iceland	Islanti	Friðrik Guðmundsson	Athletics
25	Great Britain	Iso-Britannia	Harold Whitlock	Athletics
26	Israel	Israel	Abraham Shneior	Basketball
27	Italy	Italia	Miranda Cicognani	Gymnastics
28	Austria	Itävalta	Willi Welt	Gymnastics
29	Jamaica	Jamaika	Arthur Wint	Athletics
30	Japan	Japani	Bunkichi Sawada	Athletics
31	Yugoslavia	Jugoslavia	Oto Rebula	Athletics
32	Canada	Kanada	William Parnell	Athletics
33	Korea	Korea	Han Soo-ann	Boxing
34	Gold Coast	Kultarannikko		
35	Cuba	Kuuba	Federico López	Basketball
36	Lebanon	Libanon		
37	Liechtenstein	Liechtenstein		
38	Luxembourg	Luxemburg	Camille Wagner	Football
39	Mexico	Meksiko	Joaquín Capilla	Diving
40	Monaco	Monaco		
41	Soviet Union	Neuvostoliitto	Yakov Kutsenko	Weightlifting
42	Nigeria	Nigeria	Josiah Majekodunmi	Athletics
43	Norway	Norja	Martin Stokken	Athletics
44	Pakistan	Pakistan	Niaz Khan	Field hockey
45	Panama	Panama	Carlos Chávez	Weightlifting
46	Puerto Rico	Porto Rico	Jaime Annexy	Athletics
47	Portugal	Portugali		
48	Poland	Puola	Teodor Kocerka	Rowing
49	France	Ranska	Ignace Heinrich	Athletics
50	Romania	Romania	Dumitru Paraschivescu	Athletics
51	Sweden	Ruotsi	Bo Eriksson	Fencing
52	Saar	Saar	Toni Breder	Athletics
53	Germany	Saksa	Friedel Schirmer	Athletics
54	Singapore	Singapore	Thong Saw Pak	Weightlifting
55	Switzerland	Sveitsi	Walter Lehmann	Athletics
56	Denmark	Tanska	Erik Swane Lund	Fencing
57	Thailand	Thaimaa		
58	Trinidad	Trinidad	Rodney Wilkes	Weightlifting
59	Czechoslovakia	Tšekkoslovakia	Vít Matlocha	Gymnastics
60	Turkey	Turkki	Bayram Şit	Wrestling
61	Hungary	Unkari	Imre Németh	Athletics
62	Uruguay	Uruguay	Estrella Puente	Athletics
63	New Zealand	Uusi-Seelanti	Harold Cleghorn	Weightlifting
64	Venezuela	Venezuela	Asnoldo Devonish	Athletics
65	Vietnam	Vietnam		
66	United States of America	Yhdysvallat	Norman Armitage	Fencing
67	Finland	Suomi	Väinö Suvivuo	Athletics
