= Kogure =

Kogure is a Japanese surname. Notable people with the surname include:

- Daiki Kogure (小暮 大器; born 1994), Japanese footballer
- Ema Kogure (born 1976), Japanese voice actress
- Fumiya Kogure (born 1989), Japanese football player
- Kenichiro Kogure (born 1979), Japanese futsal player
- Michiyo Kogure (1918–1990), Japanese film actress
- Shigeo Kogure (1935–2009), Japanese Olympic weightlifter
- Takashi Kogure (born 1980), Japanese racing driver
- Tamatsu Kogure (born 1930), Japanese Olympic rower
- Demon Kogure, Japanese singer

== See also ==
- 7430 Kogure, a minor planet
