= Juan Ecker =

Argentine rower

Personal information
- Born: 11 October 1930; Mar del Plata, Argentina
- Died: 10 December 2005 (aged 75); Mar del Plata, Argentina

Sport
- Sport: Rowing

Juan Ecker (11 October 1930 – 10 December 2005) was an Argentine rower. He competed in the men's coxed four event at the 1952 Summer Olympics.

== Career ==
Juan Ecker won first place in the quad at the 1955 Pan American Games with Jorge Schneider and Alfredo Czerner and second place in the octagon at the 1955 Pan American Games.
