= Grönholm =

Grönholm is a surname. Notable people with the surname include:

- Greta Grönholm, Finnish sprint canoer
- Kurt Grönholm, Finnish Olympic rower
- Maj-Len Grönholm, Finnish politician
- Marcus Grönholm, Finnish rally driver
- Niclas Grönholm, Finnish rally driver
- Ossi-Petteri Grönholm, Finnish ice hockey defenceman
- Peter Grönholm, Finnish Olympic fencer
- Sari Grönholm, Finnish Olympic snowboarder
- Ulf Grönholm, Finnish rally driver

== See also ==
- The Method (2005 film), also known as El Método Grönholm (The Grönholm Method)
