= Tukiainen =

Tukiainen is a Finnish surname.

== Geographical distribution ==
As of 2014, 96.1% of all known bearers of the surname Tukiainen were residents of Finland (frequency 1:2,855), 1.2% of Sweden (1:410,282) and 1.1% of Estonia (1:57,464).

In Finland, the frequency of the surname was higher than national average (1:2,855) in the following regions:

1. North Karelia (1:454)
2. Northern Savonia (1:797)
3. Southern Savonia (1:1,255)
4. South Karelia (1:2,103)

== People ==
- Eino Tukiainen (1915–1975), Finnish gymnast
- Antero Tukiainen (1916–1996), Finnish rower
- Aimo Tukiainen (1917–1996), Finnish sculptor
- Olli Tukiainen (born 1977), Finnish musician
- Katja Tukiainen (born 1969), Finnish visual artist and painter
- Johanna Tukiainen (born 1978), Finnish television personality and singer
