= Birger Karlsson =

Finnish rower

Personal information
- Nationality: Finnish
- Born: 12 September 1926; Porvoon maalaiskunta, Finland
- Died: 24 June 2012 (aged 85)

Sport
- Sport: Rowing

Birger Gabriel Karlsson (12 September 1926 – 24 June 2012) was a Finnish rower. He competed in the men's coxed four event at the 1952 Summer Olympics.
