= Karl-Erik Johansson =

Finnish rower

Personal information
- Nationality: Finnish
- Born: 10 February 1924; Porvoon maalaiskunta, Finland
- Died: 26 August 1987 (aged 63)

Sport
- Sport: Rowing

Karl-Erik Johansson (10 February 1924 – 26 August 1987) was a Finnish rower. He competed in the men's coxed four event at the 1952 Summer Olympics.
