= Paul Stråhlman =

Finnish rower

Personal information
- Nationality: Finnish
- Born: 23 December 1928; Porvoon maalaiskunta, Finland
- Died: 25 June 1990 (aged 61); Helsinki, Finland

Sport
- Sport: Rowing

Paul Stråhlman (23 December 1928 – 25 June 1990) was a Finnish rower. He competed in the men's coxed four event at the 1952 Summer Olympics.
