= Gerd Vogeley =

German rower 1925–2000

Personal information
- Full name: Gerhard Friedrich Hans Vogeley
- Nationality: German
- Born: 19 August 1925 Hanover, Germany
- Died: 28 September 2000 (aged 75) Pforzheim, Germany

Sport
- Sport: Rowing

Gerd Vogeley (19 August 1925 – 28 September 2000) was a German rower. He competed in the men's coxed four event at the 1952 Summer Olympics.
