= Al Ulbrickson Sr. =

American rower and coach

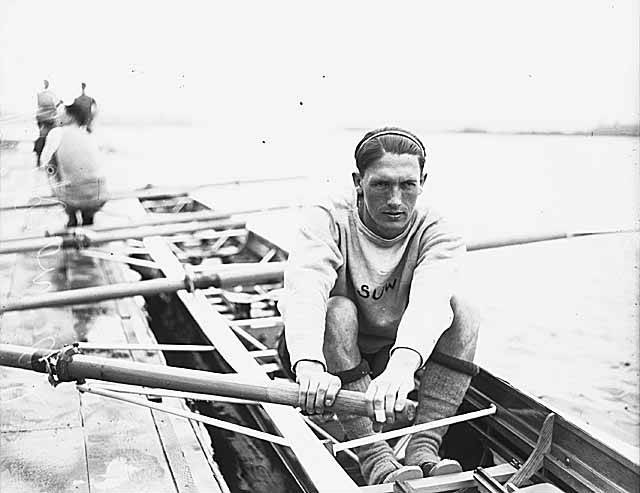

Personal information
- Born: February 11, 1903 Seattle, Washington, U.S.
- Died: November 7, 1980 (aged 77) Seattle, Washington, U.S.
- Education: University of Washington

Sport
- Sport: Rowing

Alvin M. Ulbrickson (February 11, 1903 – November 7, 1980), also known as Al Ulbrickson Sr., was an American rower and coach.

After rowing as a student at the University of Washington (UW), Ulbrickson went on to coach the crew there from 1927 until retiring in 1959. His UW crews won six Intercollegiate Rowing Association championships; four of those times they won varsity, junior varsity and freshman titles in the same year. He also coached gold medal-winning U.S. rowing teams in the 1936 (Berlin) and 1948 (London) Olympics, also taking a bronze in 1952 (Helsinki). He was one of five coaches who were charter members of UW Athletic Hall of Fame when it was established in 1979. He was the father of Alvin Edmund Ulbrickson, who himself rowed in the 1952 Summer Olympics.

Ulbrickson was portrayed by actor Joel Edgerton in the 2023 film The Boys in the Boat.
