= Graham Fisk =

British rower

Personal information
- Nationality: British
- Born: 5 February 1928; Sydney, Australia
- Died: 7 June 2008 (aged 80); Sydney, Australia

Sport
- Sport: Rowing

Graham Fisk (5 February 1928 – 7 June 2008) was a British rower. He competed in the men's coxed four event at the 1952 Summer Olympics.
