= Laurence Guest =

British rower

Lawrence Guest
Personal information
- Born: 3 January 1936 Hampstead, England
- Died: 14 January 2016 (aged 80) Chichester, England

Sport
- Sport: Rowing

Lawrence Guest (3 January 1936 – 14 January 2016) was a British rower. He competed in the men's coxed four event at the 1952 Summer Olympics. He then trained as an accountant, and became finance director of Mirror Group Newspapers in 1977, and later reported to its owner, Robert Maxwell, after he bought the company in 1984.

He was an accomplished sailor, and was popular and well-liked. In 1969, he was awarded a commendation and certificate of bravery when he rescued two boys from a house which was on fire.
