= Amadeo Scarpi =

Italian rower

Personal information
- Born: 15 September 1917
- Died: 2011 (aged 93–94)

Sport
- Sport: Rowing
Medal record
Men's rowing
Representing Italy
European Rowing Championships
Silver medal – second place	1950 Milan	Coxed four

Amadeo Scarpi (15 September 1917 – 2011) was an Italian rower. He competed at the 1952 Summer Olympics in Helsinki with the men's coxed four where they were eliminated in the semi-final repêchage.
