= André Goursolle =

French rower

Personal information
- Full name: Yves André Goursolle
- Nationality: French
- Born: 6 August 1931; Saint-Denis-de-Pile, France
- Died: 18 May 2014 (aged 82); Libourne, France

Sport
- Sport: Rowing

Yves André Goursolle (6 August 1931 – 18 May 2014) was a French rower. He competed in the men's coxed four event at the 1952 Summer Olympics.
