= Günter Twiesselmann =

German rower (1925–2025)

Personal information
- Born: 15 August 1925 Hanover, Province of Hanover, Prussia, Germany
- Died: 24 September 2025 (aged 100)

Sport
- Country: Germany
- Sport: Rowing
- Event: 1952 Summer Olympics

Günter Twiesselmann (15 August 1925 – 24 September 2025) was a German rower. He competed in the men's coxed four event at the 1952 Summer Olympics.

Twiesselmann died on 24 September 2025, a few weeks after his 100th birthday.
