= Richard Wahlstrom =

American rower (1931–2003)

Olympic medal record

Men's rowing
| Bronze medal – third place | 1952 Helsinki | Coxed four |

Richard Wayne Wahlstrom (November 8, 1931 – December 18, 2003) was an American rower who competed in the 1952 Summer Olympics.

He was born in Seattle and died in Snohomish county, Washington. He attended Edmonds High School.

In 1952 he was a crew member of the American boat which won the bronze medal in the coxed fours event. Matt Leanderson from the same crew was also from Edmonds High School.
