= Albino Trevisan =

Italian rower (1931–2020)

Personal information
- Born: 3 March 1931 Venezia
- Died: 3 April 2020 (aged 89) Sommariva del Bosco

Sport
- Sport: Rowing
Medal record
Men's rowing
Representing Italy
European Rowing Championships
Silver medal – second place	1950 Milan	Coxed four

Albino Trevisan (3 March 1931 – 3 April 2020) was an Italian rower. He competed at the 1952 Summer Olympics in Helsinki with the men's coxed four where they were eliminated in the semi-final repêchage.
