= Paul Massey (rower) =

British rower

Olympic medal record

Men's rowing
Silver medal – second place	1948 London	Eight

Paul Mackintosh Orgill Massey (12 March 1929 – 21 October 2009) was a British rower who competed in the 1948 Summer Olympics and in the 1952 Summer Olympics.

In 1948 Massey was a crew member of the British boat which won the silver medal in the eights. Four years later he finished fourth with the British boat in the coxed fours competition. In 1949 and 1950, he was a member of the victorious Cambridge crew in the Boat Race.

A mountain, Massey Heights, is named after him in Antarctica, and he was Master of the Worshipful Company of Grocers.

== See also ==
- List of Cambridge University Boat Race crews
