= Bent Blach Petersen =

Danish rower

Personal information
- Born: 28 September 1924 Aarhus, Denmark
- Died: 1 January 1984 (aged 59) Langenæs, Denmark

Sport
- Sport: Rowing

Achievements and titles
- Olympic finals: 1952 Summer Olympics
Medal record
Men's rowing
Representing Denmark
European Rowing Championships
Bronze medal – third place	1949 Amsterdam	Coxed four
Gold medal – first place	1950 Milan	Coxed four

Bent Blach Petersen (28 September 1924 – 1 January 1984) was a Danish rower. He competed at the 1952 Summer Olympics in Helsinki with the men's coxed four where they were eliminated in the semi-final repêchage.
