= 1952 Summer Olympics medal table =

1952 Summer Olympics medals
- Location: Helsinki, Finland

Highlights
- Most gold medals: United States (40)
- Most total medals: United States (76)
- Medalling NOCs: 43

World map showing the medal achievements of each country during the 1952 Summer Olympics Legend: represents countries that won at least one gold medal. represents countries that won at least one silver medal but no gold medals. represents countries that won at least one bronze medal (no gold or silver). represents participating countries that did not win medals. represents entities that did not participate at the 1952 Summer Olympics.

The 1952 Summer Olympics, officially known as the Games of the XV Olympiad and commonly known as Helsinki 1952, were an international multi-sport event held from 19 July to 3 August 1952 in Helsinki, Finland. A total of 4,955 athletes representing 69 National Olympic Committees (NOCs) participated, which included 12 teams making their Olympic debut at the Summer Games: The Bahamas, Guatemala, Hong Kong, Indonesia, Israel, Netherlands Antilles, Nigeria, People's Republic of China, Saar, the Soviet Union, Thailand, and Vietnam. The games featured 149 events across 17 sports in 23 disciplines, including the Olympic debut of women's individual gymnastics events and the transition of equestrian sports becoming mixed. In addition, pesäpallo, a Finnish baseball variant, was played as a non-medal demonstration event.

China competed under the name of the People's Republic of China (PRC) for the first time, although they only arrived in time to participate in one event. From 1924 to 1948, athletes from mainland China competed as the delegation of the Republic of China (ROC). As a result of the Chinese Civil War, a number of government and NOC representatives had fled to Taiwan and claimed to be the proper representative party of China. The International Olympic Committee (IOC) granted the ROC designation to the group in Taiwan and allowed both the PRC and ROC to compete with the name "China", although the latter withdrew in protest.

Athletes representing 43 NOCs received at least one medal, with 27 NOCs winning at least one gold medal. The United States won the most gold medals, with 40, and the most overall medals, with 78. Bulgaria, Lebanon, the Soviet Union, and Venezuela won their first medals. Luxembourg, Romania, and the Soviet Union also won their first gold medals. Among individual participants, Soviet gymnast Viktor Chukarin won the most gold medals, with four, while fellow Soviet gymnast Maria Gorokhovskaya won the most overall medals, with seven (two gold and five silver).

== Medal table ==
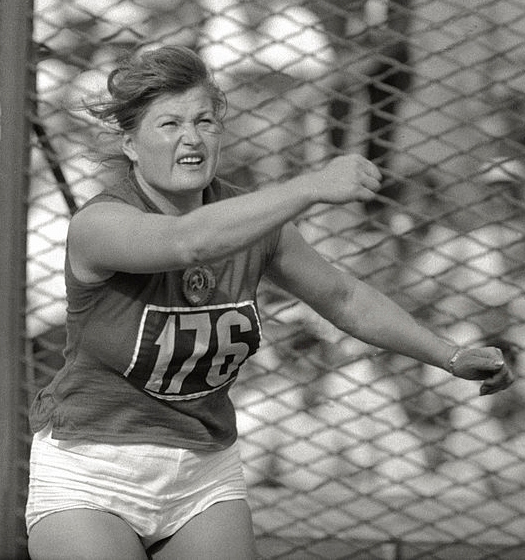
Nina Ponomaryova, pictured here at the 1960 Summer Olympics, was the first athlete representing the Soviet Union to win a gold medal, doing so in the women's discus throw event.

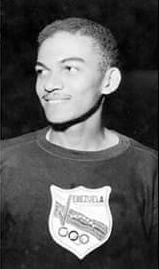
Asnoldo Devonish won Venezuela's first Olympic medal of any kind, winning bronze in the men's triple jump.

The medal table is based on information provided by the IOC and is consistent with IOC conventional sorting in its published medal tables. The table uses the Olympic medal table sorting method. By default, the table is ordered by the number of gold medals the athletes from a nation have won, where a nation is an entity represented by a NOC. The number of silver medals is taken into consideration next and then the number of bronze medals. If teams are still tied, equal ranking is given and they are listed alphabetically by their IOC country code.

In the men's floor, men's horizontal bar, and men's pommel horse events there were two-way ties for second, which resulted in two silver medals and no bronze medals being awarded in each event. In the men's rings and men's vault events there were two-way ties for third, which resulted in an additional bronze medal being awarded in each event.

Events in boxing result in a bronze medal being awarded to each of the two competitors who lose their semi-final matches, as opposed to them fighting in a third place tie breaker.

* Host nation (Finland)

1952 Summer Olympics medal table
Rank	NOC	Gold	Silver	Bronze	Total
1	United States	40	19	17	76
2	Soviet Union	22	30	19	71
3	Hungary	16	10	16	42
4	Sweden	12	13	10	35
5	Italy	8	9	4	21
6	Czechoslovakia	7	3	3	13
7	France	6	6	6	18
8	Finland*	6	3	13	22
9	Australia	6	2	3	11
10	Norway	3	2	0	5
11	Switzerland	2	6	6	14
12	South Africa	2	4	4	10
13	Jamaica	2	3	0	5
14	Belgium	2	2	0	4
15	Denmark	2	1	3	6
16	Turkey	2	0	1	3
17	Japan	1	6	2	9
18	Great Britain	1	2	8	11
19	Argentina	1	2	2	5
20	Poland	1	2	1	4
21	Canada	1	2	0	3
21	Yugoslavia	1	2	0	3
23	Romania	1	1	2	4
24	Brazil	1	0	2	3
24	New Zealand	1	0	2	3
26	India	1	0	1	2
27	Luxembourg	1	0	0	1
28	Germany	0	7	17	24
29	Netherlands	0	5	0	5
30	Iran	0	3	4	7
31	Chile	0	2	0	2
32	Austria	0	1	1	2
32	Lebanon	0	1	1	2
34	Ireland	0	1	0	1
34	Mexico	0	1	0	1
34	Spain	0	1	0	1
37	South Korea	0	0	2	2
37	Trinidad and Tobago	0	0	2	2
37	Uruguay	0	0	2	2
40	Bulgaria	0	0	1	1
40	Egypt	0	0	1	1
40	Portugal	0	0	1	1
40	Venezuela	0	0	1	1
Totals (43 entries)		149	152	158	459

== See also ==
- All-time Olympic Games medal table
- List of 1952 Summer Olympics medal winners
- 1952 Winter Olympics medal table
