= Kurt Grönholm =

Finnish rower

Personal information
- Nationality: Finnish
- Born: 16 December 1926; Porvoon maalaiskunta, Finland
- Died: 1 May 2017 (aged 90)

Sport
- Sport: Rowing

Kurt Rolf Grönholm (16 December 1926 – 1 May 2017) was a Finnish rower. He competed in the men's coxed four event at the 1952 Summer Olympics.
