= Ibrahim El-Attar =

Egyptian rower (1928–2026)

Personal information
- Nationality: Egyptian
- Born: 22 February 1928
- Died: 29 July 2026 (aged 98) Cairo, Egypt

Sport
- Sport: Rowing

Ibrahim Wagih El-Attar (22 February 1928 – 29 July 2026) was an Egyptian rower. He competed in the men's coxed four event at the 1952 Summer Olympics. El-Attar died in Cairo on 29 July 2026, at the age of 98.
