= Hans Joachim Wiemken =

German rower 1926–1970

Personal information
- Full name: Hans-Joachim August Willi Louis Wiemken
- Nationality: German
- Born: 22 May 1926 Hanover, Germany
- Died: 9 April 1970 (aged 43) Hanover, West Germany

Sport
- Sport: Rowing

Hans Joachim Wiemken (22 May 1926 – 9 April 1970) was a German rower. He competed in the men's coxed four event at the 1952 Summer Olympics.
