= Abbondio Smerghetto =

Italian rower (1931–2018)

Personal information
- Nationality: Italian
- Born: 10 March 1931; Venice, Italy
- Died: 17 October 2018 (aged 87); Venice, Italy

Sport
- Sport: Rowing

Abbondio Smerghetto (10 March 1931 – 17 October 2018) was an Italian rower. He competed in the men's coxed four event at the 1952 Summer Olympics.
