= Heinz Beyer =

German rower

Personal information
- Nationality: German
- Born: 28 July 1910; Stettin, German Empire
- Died: 26 April 1975 (aged 64); Hanover, West Germany

Sport
- Sport: Rowing

Heinz Beyer (28 July 1910 – 26 April 1975) was a German rower. He competed in the men's coxed four event at the 1952 Summer Olympics.
