= Eivin Kristensen =

Danish rower (1926–2005)

Personal information
- Born: 6 February 1926 Aarhus, Denmark
- Died: 14 June 2005 (aged 79)

Sport
- Sport: Rowing
Medal record
Men's rowing
Representing Denmark
European Rowing Championships
Silver medal – second place	1949 Amsterdam	Coxless four
Silver medal – second place	1951 Mâcon	Coxless four

Eivin Kristensen (6 February 1926 – 14 June 2005) was a Danish rower. He competed at the 1952 Summer Olympics in Helsinki with the men's coxed four where they were eliminated in the semi-final repêchage.
