= Peter de Giles =

British rower

Personal information
- Nationality: British (English)
- Born: 8 April 1927
- Died: 10 April 2015 (aged 88)

Sport
- Sport: Rowing
- Club: Leander Club; Thames Rowing Club
Medal record
Rowing
Representing England
British Empire Games
Bronze medal – third place	1950 Auckland	Eights

Peter Anthony de Giles (8 April 1927 – 10 April 2015) was a British rower who competed at the 1952 Summer Olympics.

== Rowing career ==
De Giles was educated at Wellington School in Somerset and studied at Queens' College, Cambridge.

He represented the English team at the 1950 British Empire Games in Auckland, New Zealand, where he won the bronze medal in the eights event.

At the 1952 Olympic Games, he competed in the men's coxed four event.

== Personal life ==
During the Games in 1950 he lived at Roslyn, Galton Park Road, Redhill, Surrey and was a farm student by trade.
