= Boris Brechko =

Soviet rower

Personal information
- Born: 7 December 1910
- Died: 8 July 1987 (aged 76)

Sport
- Sport: Rowing
Medal record
Men's rowing
Representing the Soviet Union
European Rowing Championships
Silver medal – second place	1953 Copenhagen	Coxed four

Boris Silovich Brechko (Russian: Борис Силович Бречко; 7 December 1910 – 8 July 1987) was a Russian rower who represented the Soviet Union. He competed at the 1952 Summer Olympics in Helsinki with the men's coxed four where they were eliminated in the semi-final repechage.
