= Klaus Schulze (rower) =

German rower

Personal information
- Nationality: German
- Born: 3 January 1928; Halle, Germany
- Died: 16 April 2013 (aged 85)

Sport
- Sport: Rowing

Klaus Schulze (3 January 1928 – 16 April 2013) was a German rower. He competed in the men's coxed four event at the 1952 Summer Olympics.
