= Robert Texier =

French rower

Personal information
- Full name: Guy Robert Daniel Texier
- Nationality: French
- Born: 19 February 1930; Libourne, France
- Died: 18 January 2017 (aged 86); Libourne, France

Sport
- Sport: Rowing

Guy Robert Daniel Texier (19 February 1930 – 18 January 2017) was a French rower. He competed in the men's coxed four event at the 1952 Summer Olympics.
