= Yevgeny Tretnikov =

Personal information
- Born: 23 February 1919
- Died: 1992 (aged 72–73)

Sport
- Sport: Rowing

Yevgeny Tretnikov (Russian: Евгений Третников; 23 February 1919 – 1992) was a Russian rower who represented the Soviet Union. He competed at the 1952 Summer Olympics in Helsinki with the men's coxed four where they were eliminated in the semi-final repêchage.
