= Tarquinio Angiolin =

Italian rower

Personal information
- Nationality: Italian
- Born: 12 April 1928; Venice, Italy
- Died: 28 November 2012 (aged 84); Venice, Italy

Sport
- Sport: Rowing

Tarquinio Angiolin (12 April 1928 – 28 November 2012) was an Italian rower. He competed in the men's coxed four event at the 1952 Summer Olympics.
