= Karel Mejta Jr. =

Czech rower

Medal record

Representing Czechoslovakia

Men's rowing

World Championships
Bronze medal – third place	1977 Amsterdam	Coxed pair

Karel Mejta (born 2 July 1951 in Třeboň) was a Czech rower who competed for Czechoslovakia at world championships and in the 1976 and 1980 Summer Olympics. His father was Karel Mejta Sr.
