= Mamdooh El-Attar =

Egyptian rower

Personal information
- Nationality: Egyptian
- Born: 14 July 1926
- Died: 3 February 2005 (aged 78)

Sport
- Sport: Rowing

Mamdooh El-Attar (14 July 1926 – 3 February 2005) was an Egyptian rower. He competed in the men's coxed four event at the 1952 Summer Olympics.
