= Kirill Putyrsky =

Soviet rower (1928–2021)

Personal information
- Born: 1 October 1928 Leningrad, Russian SFSR, Soviet Union
- Died: 8 July 2021 (aged 92)

Sport
- Sport: Rowing
Medal record
Men's rowing
Representing the Soviet Union
European Rowing Championships
Silver medal – second place	1953 Copenhagen	Coxed four

Kirill Borisovich Putyrsky (Russian: Кирилл Борисович Путырский; 1 October 1928 – 8 July 2021) was a Russian rower who represented the Soviet Union. He competed at the 1952 Summer Olympics in Helsinki with the men's coxed four where they were eliminated in the semi-final repêchage. Putyrsky died on 8 July 2021, at the age of 92.
