= Didier Moureau =

French rower (1930–2023)

Didier Moreau
Personal information
- Full name: Didier Georges Moreau
- Nationality: French
- Born: 25 May 1930; Pontgouin, France
- Died: 9 December 2023 (aged 93); Bry-sur-Marne, France

Sport
- Sport: Rowing

Didier Georges Moreau (25 May 1930 – 9 December 2023) was a French rower. He competed in the men's coxed four event at the 1952 Summer Olympics. Moreau died in Bry-sur-Marne on 9 December 2023, at the age of 93.
