= Massey Heights =

The Massey Heights (63°58′S 57°58′W) are prominent, flat-topped rock heights, with steeply cliffed sides, 6 nautical miles (11 km) southwest of Andreassen Point on James Ross Island, Antarctica. They were surveyed by the Falkland Islands Dependencies Survey (FIDS) in 1945 and 1955, and are named for Paul Massey, FIDS medical officer at Hope Bay in 1955.
