= František Čapek (sport shooter) =

Czech sport shooter

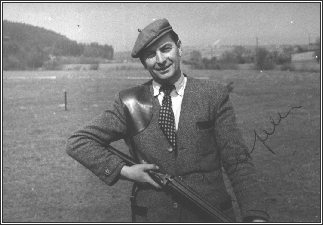

Personal information
- Born: 12 November 1914 Jasenná, Bohemia, Austria-Hungary
- Died: 17 June 1988 (aged 73) Hradec Králové, Czechoslovakia

Sport
- Sport: Sport shooting

František Čapek (12 November 1914 – 17 June 1988) was a Czech sport shooter. He competed at the 1952 Summer Olympics and 1956 Summer Olympics.
