= Antero Tukiainen =

Finnish rower

Personal information
- Nationality: Finnish
- Born: 26 February 1916; Porvoo, Finland
- Died: 14 May 1996 (aged 80); Porvoo, Finland

Sport
- Sport: Rowing

Antero Tukiainen (26 February 1916 – 14 May 1996) was a Finnish rower. He competed in the men's coxed four event at the 1952 Summer Olympics.
