= Leif Andersen (rower) =

Norwegian rower

Personal information
- Born: 26 February 1936; Bærum, Norway
- Died: 21 November 2014 (aged 78); Oslo

Sport
- Country: Norway
- Sport: Rowing
- Club: Bærum RK

Leif Andersen (26 February 1936 – 21 November 2014) was a Norwegian competition rower. He competed in the 1952 Summer Olympics.
