= John O'Brien (rower) =

New Zealand representative rower

Personal information
- Born: 1 June 1927 Whanganui, New Zealand
- Died: 25 February 1995 (aged 67)

Sport
- Country: New Zealand
- Sport: Rowing
Medal record
Men's rowing
Representing New Zealand
British Empire Games
Gold medal – first place	1950 Auckland	Coxed Four

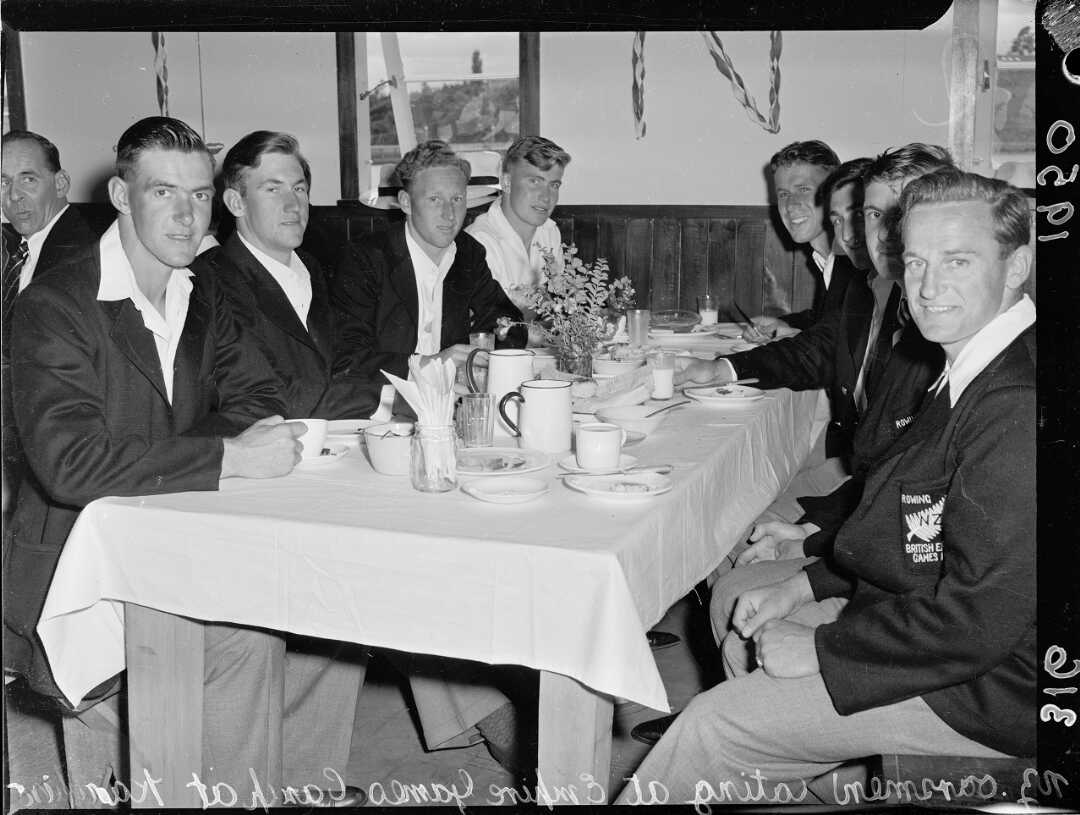
New Zealand oarsmen sitting down to a meal at the 1950 British Empire Games rowing camp at Lake Karapiro. From right: E Smith, B Culpan, J W James, W Tinnick, D Simonson, E Johnson, W Carroll, and J O'Brien. Photograph taken circa 31 January 1950 by an Evening Post photographer.

John O'Brien (1 June 1927 – 25 February 1995) was a New Zealand representative rower.

At the 1950 British Empire Games he won the gold medal as part of the men's coxed four. At the 1952 Summer Olympics he competed as part of the coxed four again, but the crew did not make the final.
