= Heini Scheller =

Swiss rower

Personal information
- Born: 3 August 1929
- Died: 1 September 1957 (aged 28) San Carlos, California, United States

Sport
- Sport: Rowing
Medal record
Men's rowing
Representing Switzerland
Olympic Games
Silver medal – second place	1952 Helsinki	Coxed four
European Rowing Championships
Bronze medal – third place	1953 Copenhagen	Coxed four
Bronze medal – third place	1954 Bosbaan	Coxless four

Heinrich Scheller (3 August 1929 – 1 September 1957) was a Swiss rower who competed in the 1952 Summer Olympics. In 1952 he was a crew member of the Swiss boat that won the silver medal in the coxed four event. Scheller died in a plane crash in 1957.
