= Thor Nilsen =

Norwegian rower (1931–2023)

Thor Sverre Nilsen
Personal information
- Born: 5 October 1931; Bærum, Norway
- Died: 5 October 2023 (aged 92)

Sport
- Country: Norway
- Sport: Rowing
- Club: Bærum RK

Thor Sverre Nilsen (5 October 1931 – 5 October 2023) was a Norwegian competition rower, coach, and sports administrator.

== Biography ==
Nilsen was born in Bærum on 5 October 1931. He competed in the 1952 Summer Olympics.

He took up coaching, and served as president for the Swedish Rowing Federation from 1994 to 1997. He was assigned as development director for the World Rowing Federation.

Nilsen died on 5 October 2023, at the age of 92.
