= Hans Caro =

Dutch rower

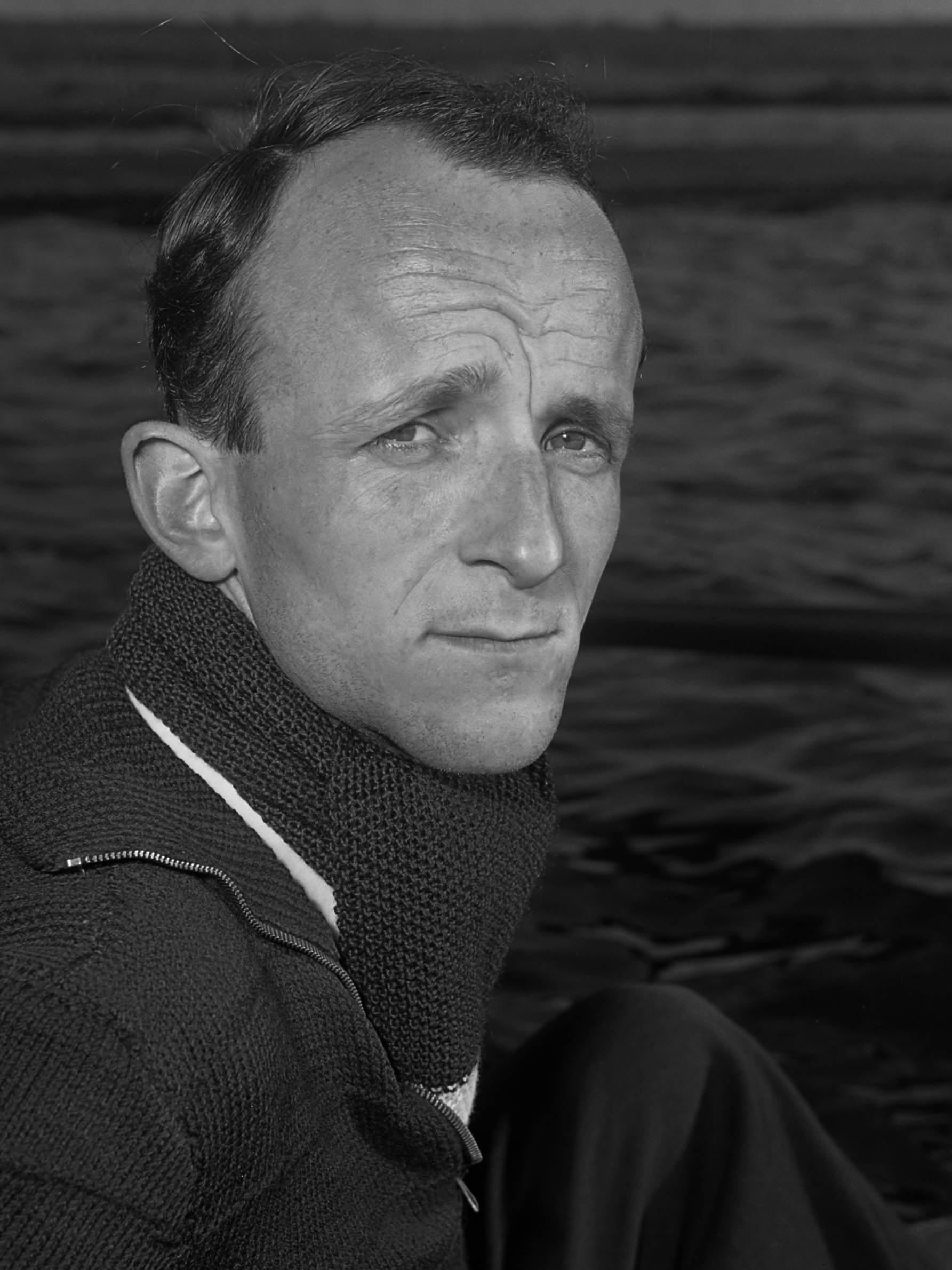
- Hans Caro in 1952

Personal information
- Nationality: Dutch
- Born: 11 August 1928; Wervershoof, Netherlands
- Died: 28 July 1972 (aged 43); Amstelveen, Netherlands

Sport
- Sport: Rowing

Hans Caro (11 August 1928 – 28 July 1972) was a Dutch rower. He competed in the men's coxed four event at the 1952 Summer Olympics.
