= Kazuo Kanda =

Japanese rower (born 1930)

Personal information
- Nationality: Japanese
- Born: 29 March 1930

Sport
- Sport: Rowing

Kazuo Kanda (born 29 March 1930) is a Japanese former rower. He competed in the men's coxed four event at the 1952 Summer Olympics.
