= Rubén Pagliari =

Argentine basketball player

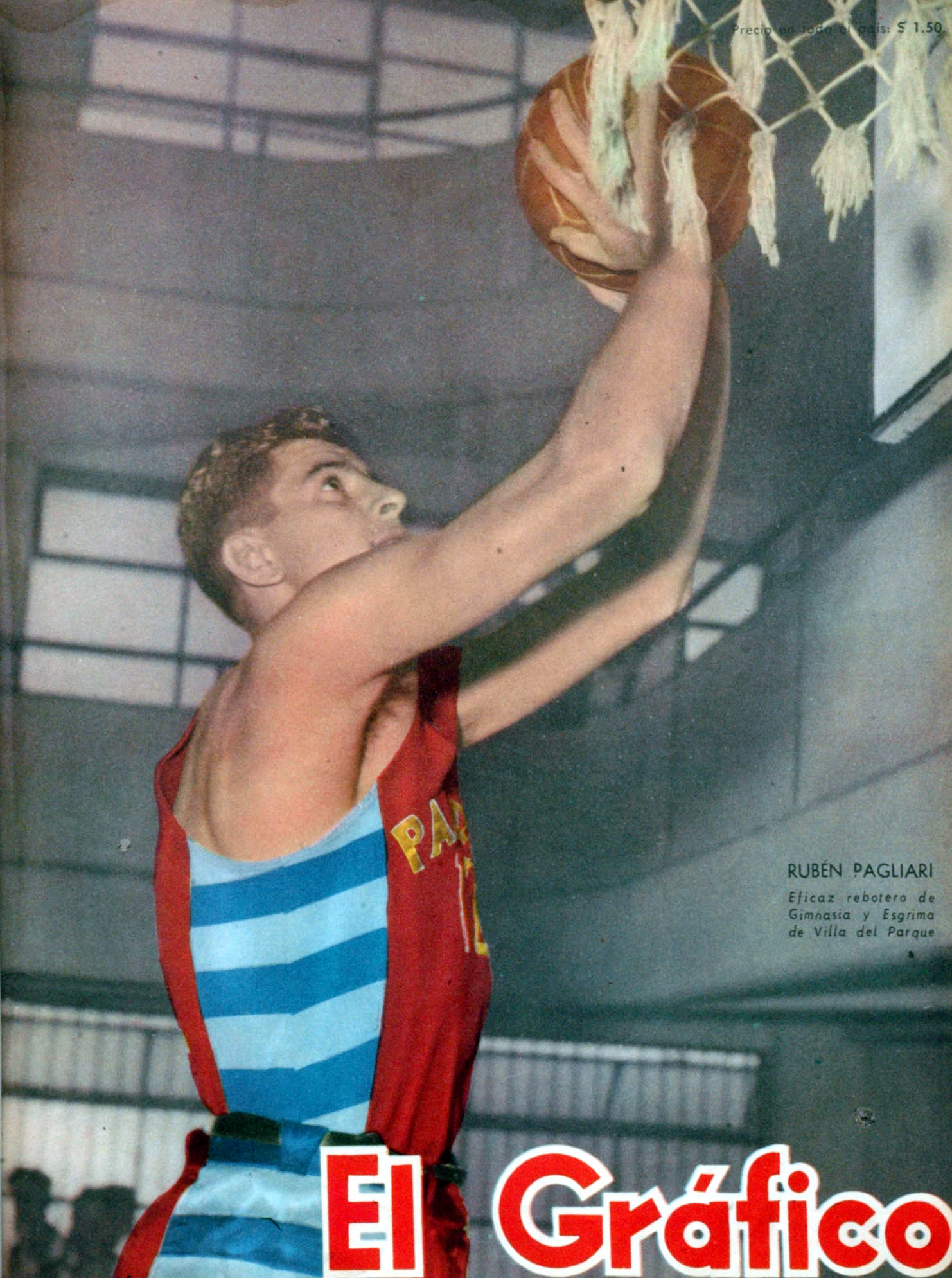
- Pagliari in El Gráfico, 1953

Personal information
- Born: 20 September 1927
- Died: 28 November 1987 (aged 60)
Medals
Men's basketball
Representing Argentina
Pan American Games
Silver medal – second place	1955 Mexico City	Team

Rubén Orlando Pagliari (20 September 1927 – 28 November 1987) was an Argentine basketball player who competed in the 1952 Summer Olympics.
