= Juan Abellán =

Spanish water polo player (born 1933)

Personal information
- Full name: Juan Luis Abellán Palahí
- Nationality: Spanish
- Born: 19 June 1933 (age 93) Barcelona, Spain

Sport
- Sport: Water polo
Medal record
Representing Spain
Mediterranean Games
Gold medal – first place	1951 Alexandria	Men's tournament

Juan Abellán (born 19 June 1933) is a Spanish water polo player. He competed in the 1952 Summer Olympics.

Abellán was part of the Spanish team who won gold in the first Mediterranean Games in 1951. As of 2018, he was the last surviving member of the team.
