= Roberto Suárez (rower) =

Argentine rower (born 1924)

Personal information
- Nationality: Argentine
- Born: 17 February 1924

Sport
- Sport: Rowing

Roberto Suárez (born 17 February 1924) was an Argentine rower. He competed in the men's coxed four event at the 1952 Summer Olympics.
