= Han Heijenbrock =

Dutch rower

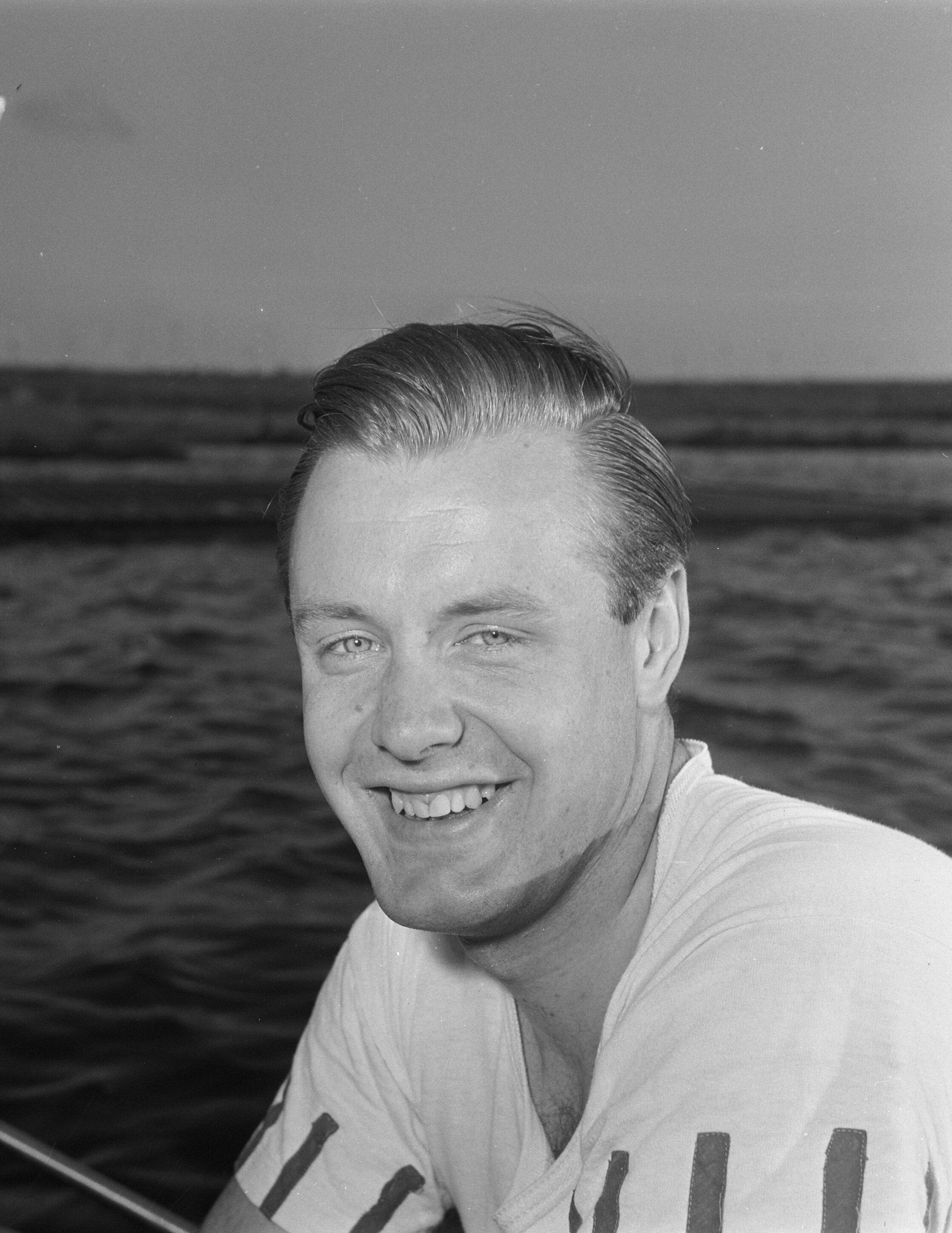
- Han Heijenbrock in 1952

Personal information
- Full name: Wilhelm Johann Heijenbrock
- Nationality: Dutch
- Born: 27 October 1929; Amsterdam, Netherlands
- Died: 26 July 2015 (aged 85); Purmerend, Netherlands

Sport
- Sport: Rowing

Han Heijenbrock (27 October 1929 – 26 July 2015) was a Dutch rower. He competed in the men's coxed four event at the 1952 Summer Olympics.
