= Al Rossi =

American rower (born 1931)

Personal information
- Full name: Albert Rossi
- Born: June 20, 1931 (age 95) Bessemer, Michigan, U.S.
Medal record
Men's rowing
Representing United States
Olympic Games
Bronze medal – third place	1952 Helsinki	Coxed four

Albert Rossi (born June 20, 1931) is an American rower who competed in the 1952 Summer Olympics. He was born in Bessemer, Michigan. In 1952 he was the coxswain of the American boat which won the bronze medal in the coxed fours event.
