= Ton Fontani =

Dutch rower

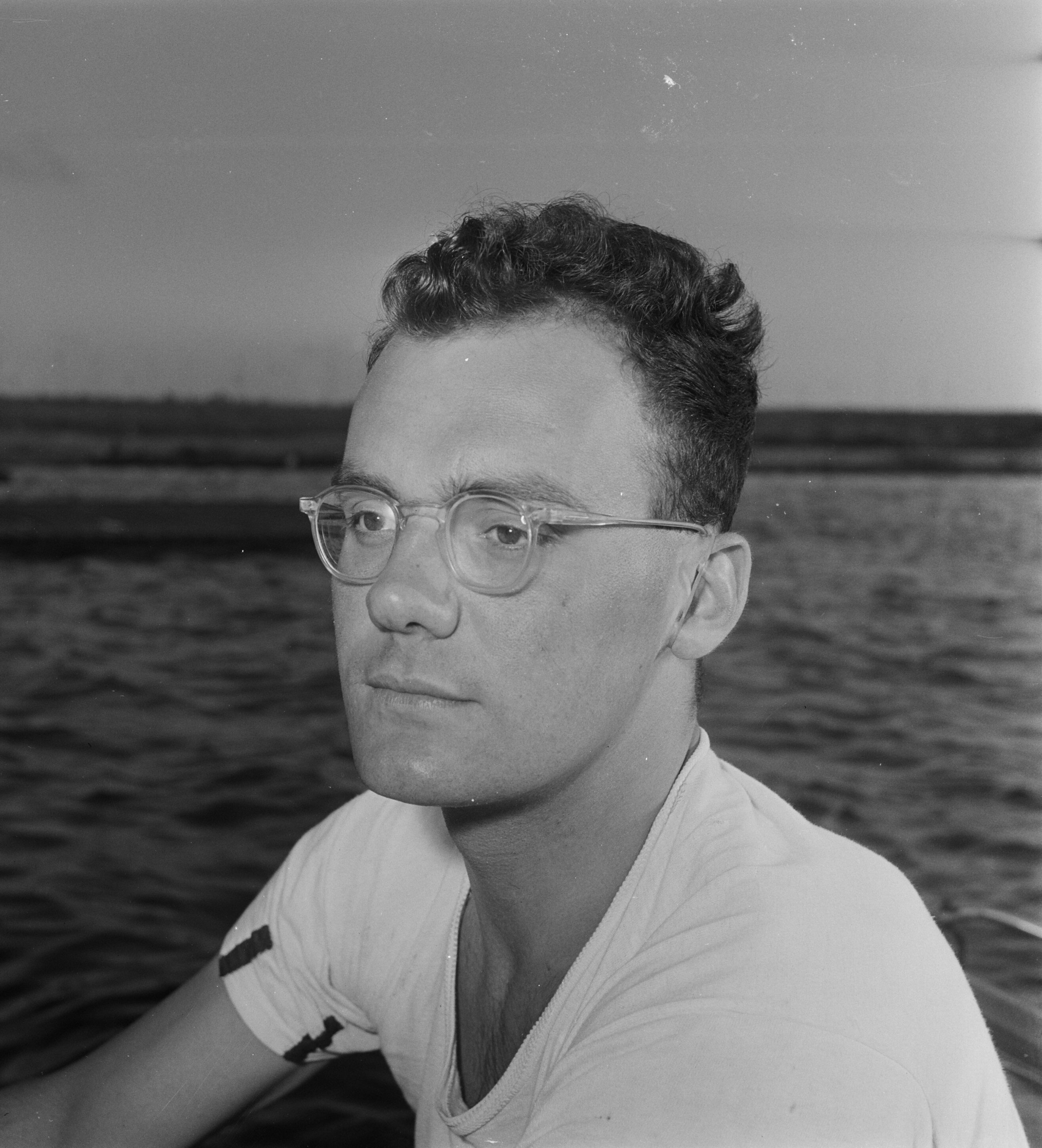
- Fontani in 1952

Personal information
- Nationality: Dutch
- Born: 15 October 1930; Amsterdam, Netherlands
- Died: 22 June 2005 (aged 74); Haarlem, Netherlands

Sport
- Sport: Rowing

Ton Fontani (15 October 1930 – 22 June 2005) was a Dutch rower. He competed in the men's coxed four event at the 1952 Summer Olympics.
