= Jorge Arripe =

Argentine rower

Personal information
- Nationality: Argentine
- Born: 21 January 1936 (age 89)

Sport
- Sport: Rowing

Jorge Arripe (born 21 January 1936) is an Argentine rower. He competed in the men's coxed four event at the 1952 Summer Olympics.
