= Shinichi Maki =

Japanese fencer 1917–1977

Personal information
- Born: 26 March 1917
- Died: 1977

Sport
- Sport: Fencing

Shinichi Maki (牧 真一, Maki Shin'ichi) (26 March 1917 – 1977) was a Japanese fencer. He competed in the individual foil, épée and sabre events at the 1952 Summer Olympics.
