= Arnfinn Larsen =

Norwegian rower (1930–2023)

Personal information
- Born: 13 July 1930 Bærum, Norway
- Died: 2 September 2023 (aged 93) Bærum, Norway

Sport
- Country: Norway
- Sport: Rowing
- Club: Bærum RK

Arnfinn Larsen (13 July 1930 – 2 September 2023) was a Norwegian competition rower. He competed in the 1952 Summer Olympics. Larsen died in Bærum on 2 September 2023, at the age of 93.
