= Carl Lovsted =

American rower (1930–2013)

Olympic medal record

Men's rowing
| Bronze medal – third place | 1952 Helsinki | Coxed four |

Carl Martin Lovsted, Jr. (April 4, 1930 – November 8, 2013) was an American rower. In 1952 he competed in the Summer Olympics as a crew member of the American boat which won the bronze medal in the coxed four event. He was born in Manila, Philippines and died in Bellevue, Washington.
