= Kosuke Matsuo =

Japanese rower (born 1930)

Personal information
- Nationality: Japanese
- Born: 4 October 1930

Sport
- Sport: Rowing

Kosuke Matsuo (born 4 October 1930) is a Japanese rower. He competed in the men's coxed four event at the 1952 Summer Olympics.
