= Francisco Gironella =

Spanish rower

Personal information
- Nationality: Spanish
- Born: 30 September 1930; Puerto de la Selva, Gerona, Spain

Sport
- Sport: Rowing

Francisco Gironella (born 30 September 1930) is a Spanish rower. He competed in the men's coxed four event at the 1952 Summer Olympics.
