= Guillermo Weller =

Argentine racewalker

Personal information
- Nationality: Argentine
- Born: 4 May 1913
- Died: 4 June 1999 (aged 86)

Sport
- Sport: Athletics
- Event: Racewalking

Guillermo Weller (4 May 1913 – 4 June 1999) was an Argentine racewalker. He competed in the men's 50 kilometres walk at the 1952 Summer Olympics and the 1960 Summer Olympics.

His personal best was 4 hours 26 minutes and 8 seconds at the 1960 Summer Olympics, though he was disqualified.
