= Ignacio Poletti =

Argentine basketball player (1930–2023)

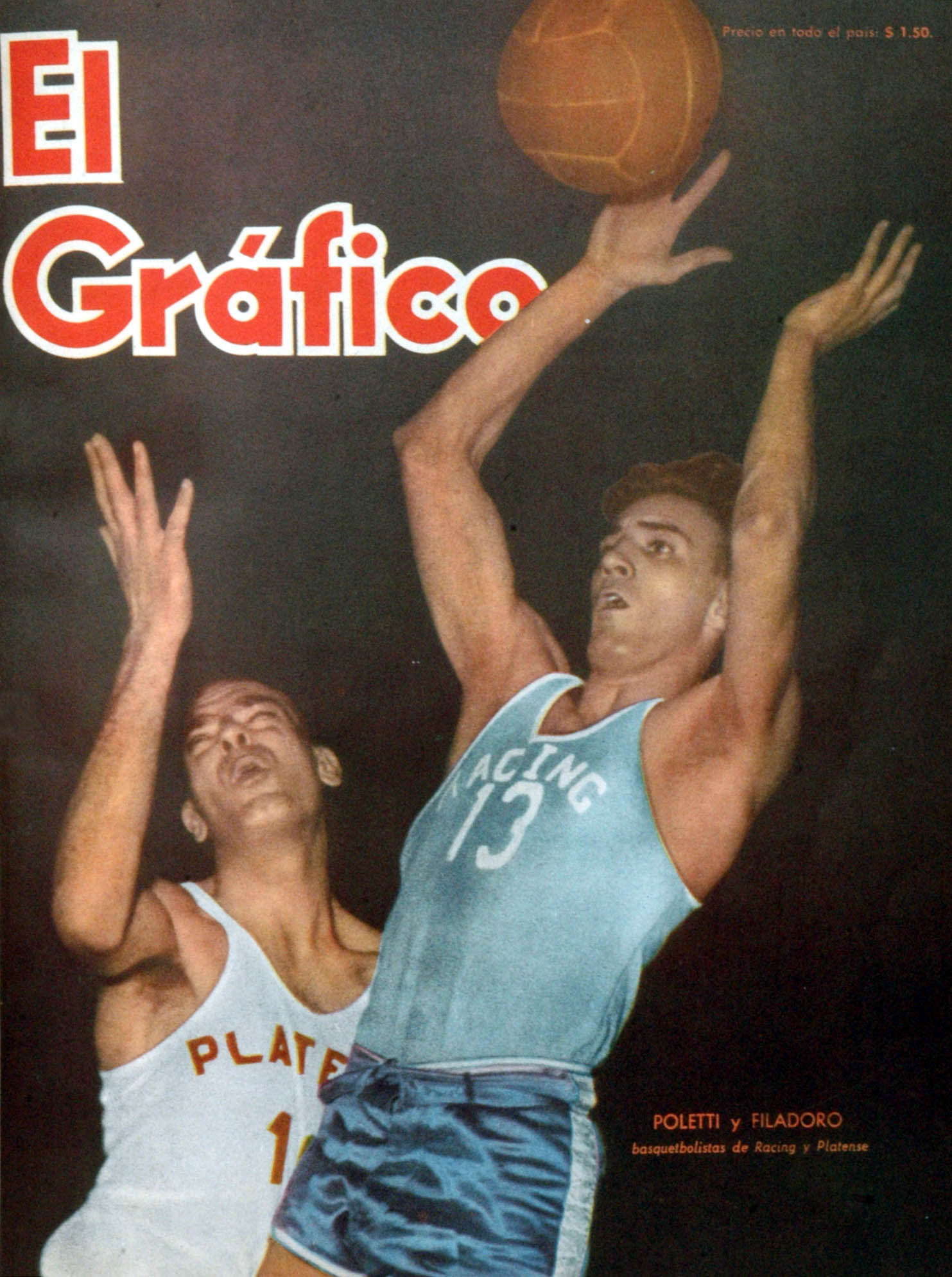
Poletti (left) on the cover of a February 1954 issue of El Gráfico

Ignacio Poletti (28 April 1930 – 13 November 2023) was an Argentine basketball player who competed in the 1952 Summer Olympics. He was born in Santa Fe. Poletti died on 13 November 2023, at the age of 93.
