= František Maxa =

Czech sport shooter (1923–2021)

Personal information
- Born: 13 February 1923 Horoměřice, Czechoslovakia
- Died: 16 September 2021 (aged 98)

Sport
- Sport: Sports shooting

František Maxa (13 February 1923 – 16 September 2021) was a Czech sport shooter who competed in the 1952 Summer Olympics and in the 1956 Summer Olympics. He died in September 2021, at the age of 98.
