= Jaap Beije =

Dutch rower

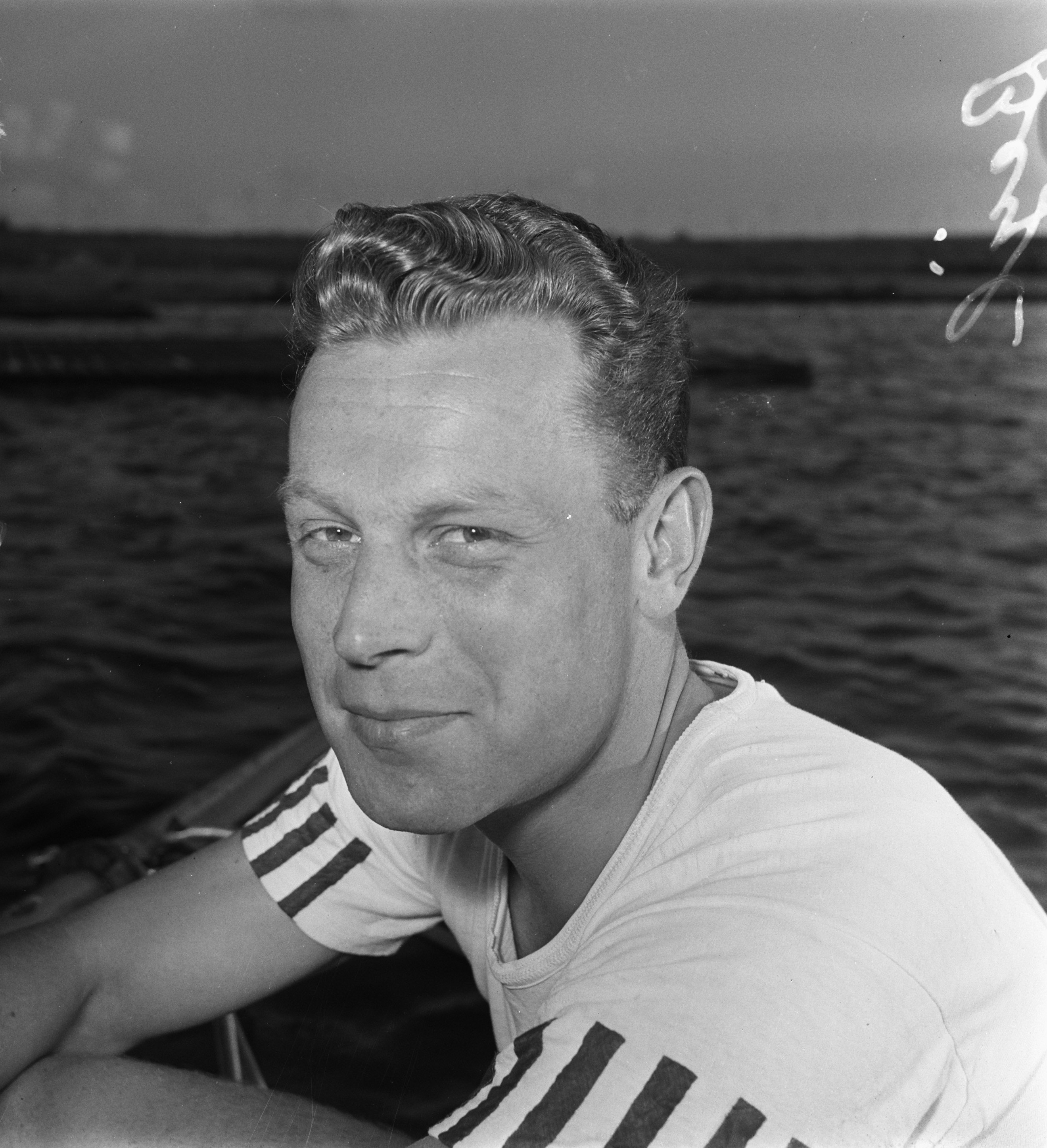
- Beije in 1952

Personal information
- Nationality: Dutch
- Born: 6 April 1927; Bodegraven, Netherlands
- Died: 7 August 2013 (aged 86)

Sport
- Sport: Rowing

Jaap Beije (6 April 1927 – 7 August 2013) was a Dutch rower. He competed in the men's coxed four event at the 1952 Summer Olympics.
