= Wilhelm Hayden =

Norwegian rower

Personal information
- Born: 11 May 1926 Gjøvik, Norway
- Died: 16 November 1997 (aged 71) Bærum

Sport
- Country: Norway
- Sport: Rowing
- Club: Bærum RK

Wilhelm Hayden (11 May 1926 – 16 November 1997) was a Norwegian competition rower. He competed in the 1952 Summer Olympics.
