= Walter Leiser =

Swiss rower (1931–2023)

Personal information
- Born: 4 May 1931
- Died: 9 December 2023 (aged 92)

Sport
- Sport: Rowing
Medal record
Men's rowing
Representing Switzerland
Olympic Games
| Silver medal – second place | 1952 Helsinki | Coxed four |
European Rowing Championships
| Bronze medal – third place | 1953 Copenhagen | Coxed four |

Walter Leiser (4 May 1931 – 9 December 2023) was a Swiss rower who competed in the 1952 Summer Olympics. In 1952 he was the coxswain of the Swiss boat which won the silver medal in the coxed four event. Leiser died on 9 December 2023, at the age of 92.
