= Rico Bianchi =

Swiss rower (1930–2025)

Personal information
- Born: Enrico Bianchi; 13 May 1930 Chur, Switzerland
- Died: 26 March 2025 (aged 94)
Medal record
Men's rowing
Representing Switzerland
Olympic Games
Silver medal – second place	1952 Helsinki	Coxed four
European Rowing Championships
Bronze medal – third place	1953 Copenhagen	Coxed four
Bronze medal – third place	1954 Bosbaan	Coxless four

Enrico Bianchi (13 May 1930 - 26 March 2025) was a Swiss rower who competed in the 1952 Summer Olympics and in the 1960 Summer Olympics. He was born in Chur. In 1952 he was a crew member of the Swiss boat which won the silver medal in the coxed four event. Eight years later he was part of the Swiss boat which was eliminated in the repêchage of the eight competition.
