= Émile Ess =

Swiss rower

Personal information
- Born: 9 January 1932 Ruswil, Switzerland
- Died: 30 November 1990 (aged 58)
Medal record
Men's rowing
Representing Switzerland
Olympic Games
Silver medal – second place	1952 Helsinki	Coxed four
European Rowing Championships
Bronze medal – third place	1953 Copenhagen	Coxed four
Bronze medal – third place	1954 Bosbaan	Coxless four
Gold medal – first place	1959 Mâcon	Coxless four

Émile Ess (9 January 1932 – 30 November 1990) was a Swiss rower who competed in the 1952 Summer Olympics and in the 1960 Summer Olympics.

He was born in Ruswil. In 1952, he was a crew member of the Swiss boat which won the silver medal in the coxed four event.

Eight years later, he was part of the Swiss boat which was eliminated in the repechage of the eight competition.
