= Karl Weidmann =

Swiss rower

Personal information
- Born: 4 July 1931 (age 94)

Sport
- Sport: Rowing
Medal record
Men's rowing
Representing Switzerland
Olympic Games
Silver medal – second place	1952 Helsinki	Coxed four
European Rowing Championships
Bronze medal – third place	1953 Copenhagen	Coxed four
Bronze medal – third place	1954 Bosbaan	Coxless four

Karl Weidmann (born 4 July 1931) is a Swiss rower who competed in the 1952 Summer Olympics.

In 1952 he was a crew member of the Swiss boat that won the silver medal in the coxed four event.
