= Al Ulbrickson =

American rower

Medal record

Men's rowing

Representing the United States

Olympic Games
Bronze medal – third place	1952 Helsinki	Coxed four

Alvin Edmund Ulbrickson Jr. (October 10, 1930 – July 6, 2012) was an American rower who competed in the 1952 Summer Olympics.

Ulbrickson was born in Seattle, and was the son of the famed University of Washington rowing coach of the same name, Al Ulbrickson Sr.

In 1952 he was a crew member of the American boat which won the bronze medal in the coxed fours event.

After two years in the Army, Ulbrickson returned to the University of Washington and served as the assistant dean of men. He later served as vice president of student affairs.

Ulbrickson died in 2012 from lung cancer.
