= Igor Treybal =

Czech sport shooter

Personal information
- Born: 27 March 1930

Sport
- Sport: Sport shooting

Igor Treybal (born 27 March 1930) is a Czech former sport shooter. He competed for Czechoslovakia at the 1952 Summer Olympics and 1956 Summer Olympics.
