= Salvador Costa =

Spanish rower

Salvador Costa Fontclara
Personal information
- Born: 17 March 1931 El Port de la Selva, Spain

Sport
- Sport: Rowing
Medal record
Men's rowing
Representing Spain
European Rowing Championships
Bronze medal – third place	1951 Mâcon	Coxed four

Salvador Costa Fontclara (born 17 March 1931) is a Spanish rower. He competed at the 1952 Summer Olympics in Helsinki with the men's coxed four where they were eliminated in the round one repêchage.
