= Jan Willem Pennink =

Dutch rower

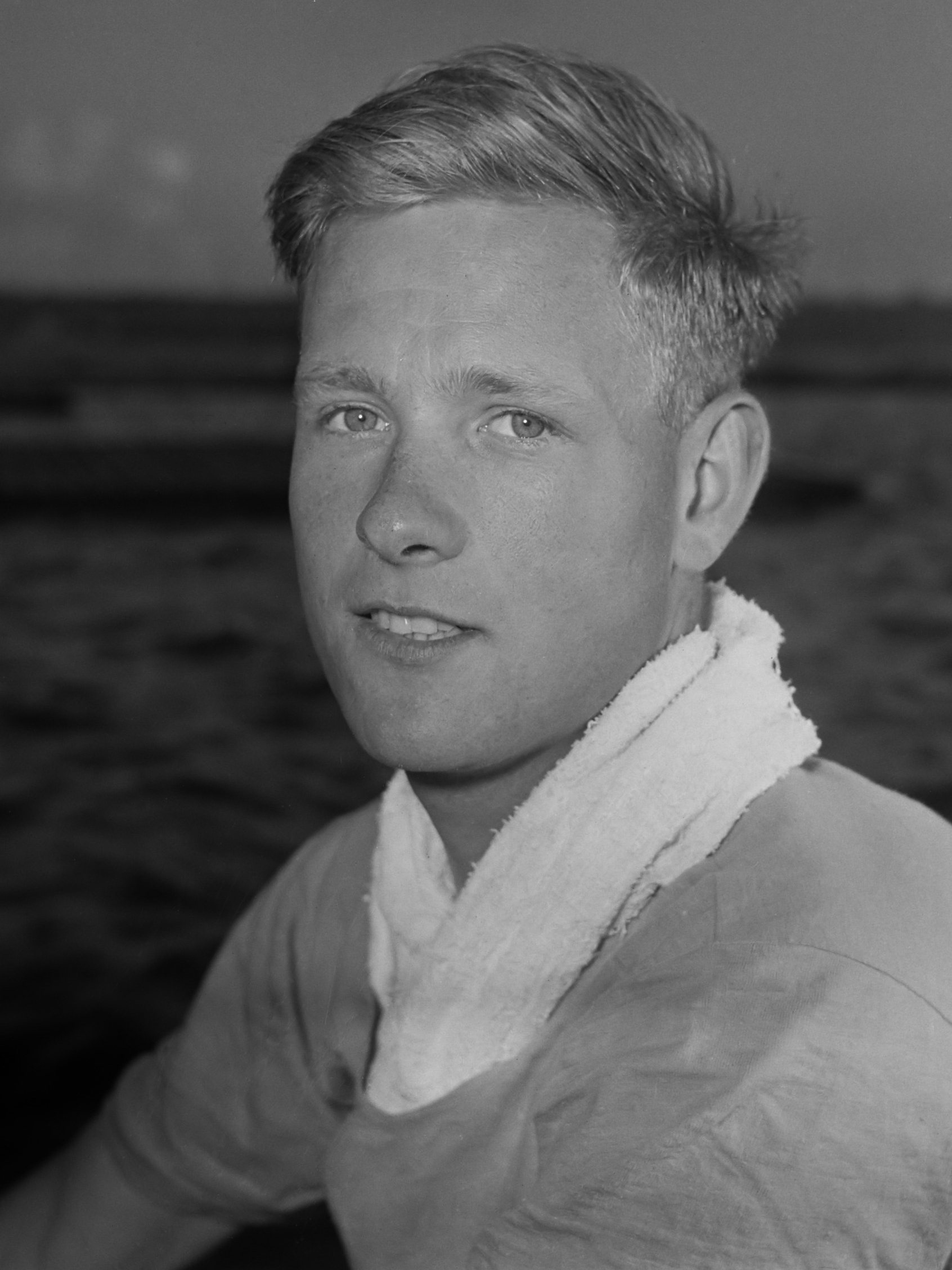
- Jan Willem Pennink in 1952

Personal information
- Nationality: Dutch
- Born: 31 March 1929 (age 97) Jakarta, Dutch East Indies

Sport
- Sport: Rowing

Jan Willem Pennink (born 31 March 1929) is a Dutch rower. He competed in the men's coxed four event at the 1952 Summer Olympics.
