= Ryuji Goto =

Japanese rower (born 1931)

Personal information
- Nationality: Japanese
- Born: 10 September 1931

Sport
- Sport: Rowing

Ryuji Goto (born 10 September 1931) is a Japanese rower. He competed in the men's coxed four event at the 1952 Summer Olympics.
