= Miguel Palau (rower) =

Spanish rower (1928–2010)

Personal information
- Born: 24 August 1928 El Port de la Selva, Spain
- Died: 2010 Vilajuïga, Spain

Sport
- Sport: Rowing
Medal record
Men's rowing
Representing Spain
European Rowing Championships
Bronze medal – third place	1951 Mâcon	Coxed four

Miguel Palau Vila (24 August 1928 – 2010) was a Spanish rower. He competed at the 1952 Summer Olympics in Helsinki with the men's coxed four where they were eliminated in the round one repêchage.
