= Marcelo Trabucco =

Argentine swimmer

Personal information
- Born: 11 April 1934 Buenos Aires, Argentina
- Died: 21 September 2006 (aged 72)

Sport
- Sport: Swimming

Marcelo Trabucco (11 April 1934 – 21 September 2006) was an Argentine freestyle swimmer. He competed in two events at the 1952 Summer Olympics.
