= Luis Omedes (sportsman, born 1938) =

Spanish sportsman (1938–2022)

Personal information
- Full name: Lluís Omedes i Calonja
- Nationality: Spanish
- Born: 12 January 1938; Alza, Gipuzkoa, Spain
- Died: 18 July 2022 (aged 84)

Sport
- Sport: Rowing, luge

Luis Omedes (12 January 1938 – 18 July 2022) was a Spanish sportsman. He competed in the men's coxed four event in the rowing at the 1952 Summer Olympics. He also competed in the men's singles in the luge at the 1968 Winter Olympics.

== See also ==
- List of athletes who competed in both the Summer and Winter Olympic games
