= Pedro Massana =

Spanish rower

Personal information
- Born: 19 December 1923 Barcelona
- Died: 28 July 1991 (aged 67)

Sport
- Sport: Rowing
Medal record
Men's rowing
Representing Spain
European Rowing Championships
Bronze medal – third place	1951 Mâcon	Coxed four

Pedro Massana Calvet (19 December 1923 – 28 July 1991) was a Spanish rower who competed in the 1952 Summer Olympics. He was born in Barcelona.
