= Karel Mejta Sr. =

Czech rower

Karel Mejta
Personal information
- Born: 18 June 1928 Třeboň, Czechoslovakia
- Died: 6 November 2015 (aged 87) České Budějovice, Czech Republic
- Relatives: Karel Mejta Jr. (son)

Sport
- Sport: Rowing
Medal record
Men's rowing
Representing Czechoslovakia
Olympic Games
| Gold medal – first place | 1952 Helsinki | Coxed four |
European Championships
| Gold medal – first place | 1953 Copenhagen | Coxed four |
| Bronze medal – third place | 1954 Amsterdam | Coxed four |

Karel Mejta (18 June 1928 – 6 November 2015) was a Czech rower who competed for Czechoslovakia in the 1952 Summer Olympics.

He was born in Třeboň. In 1952 he was a crew member of the Czechoslovak boat which won the gold medal in the coxed fours event. His son is Karel Mejta Jr.
