= Tamatsu Kogure =

Japanese rower (born 1930)

Personal information
- Nationality: Japanese
- Born: 7 October 1930

Sport
- Sport: Rowing

Tamatsu Kogure (born 7 October 1930) is a Japanese rower. He competed in the men's coxed four event at the 1952 Summer Olympics.
