= Matt Leanderson =

American rower (1931–2006)

Olympic medal record

Men's rowing
Bronze medal – third place	1952 Helsinki	Coxed four

Matthew Fillip "Fil" Leanderson (March 11, 1931 – November 2, 2006) was an American rower who competed in the 1952 Summer Olympics.

He was born in Seattle, Washington and grew up in Alderwood Manor, and graduated from Edmonds High School.

In 1952, he was the stroke of the American boat in the Olympic Four with coxwain event. Because their coach was absent at the Olympics, Leanderson directed his team which won the bronze medal with a 7:37.0 finish, just 0.5 seconds behind the silver-medal-winning Swiss team.

He went on to coach at the Massachusetts Institute of Technology and later left MIT to coach the freshman crew team at the University of Washington, where he took over as head coach from 1959 to 1967. He also coached rowing at Western Washington University from 1977 to 1993. Leanderson was inducted into the Western Washington University Hall of Fame in 1998 and the University of Washington Hall of Fame in 2002.

He died in Kirkland, Washington. He is interred at Evergreen Washelli Memorial Park.
