= Jorge Schneider =

Argentine rower (1933–2003)

Personal information
- Born: 16 October 1933; Mar del Plata, Argentina
- Died: 10 October 2003 (aged 69); California, United States

Sport
- Sport: Rowing

Jorge Schneider (16 October 1933 – 10 October 2003) was an Argentine rower. He competed in the men's coxed four event at the 1952 Summer Olympics.
