= Alfredo Czerner =

Argentine rower (1934–2025)

Personal information
- Born: 16 July 1934 Funes, Santa Fe, Argentina
- Died: 26 September 2025 (aged 91) Los Angeles, California, U.S.

Sport
- Sport: Rowing

Alfredo Pablo Czerner Arnhold (16 July 1934 – 26 September 2025) was an Argentine rower. He competed in the men's coxed four event at the 1952 Summer Olympics.

Czerner died on 26 September 2025 in Los Angeles, California, at the age of 91.
