= Jiří Havlis =

Czech rower

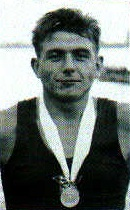
- Havlis during his active years

Personal information
- Born: 16 November 1932 Majdalena, Czechoslovakia
- Died: 31 January 2010 (aged 77)

Sport
- Sport: Rowing
Medal record
Men's rowing
Representing Czechoslovakia
Olympic Games
Gold medal – first place	1952 Helsinki	Coxed four
European Championships
Gold medal – first place	1953 Copenhagen	Coxed four
Bronze medal – third place	1954 Amsterdam	Coxed four

Jiří Havlis (16 November 1932 – 31 January 2010) was a Czech rower who competed for Czechoslovakia in the 1952 Summer Olympics.

He was born in Majdalena, Jindřichův Hradec District. In 1952 he was a crew member of the Czechoslovak boat which won the gold medal in the coxed four event.
