= Miroslav Koranda =

Personal information
- Born: 6 November 1934 Prague, Czechoslovakia
- Died: 6 October 2008 (aged 73)

Sport
- Sport: Rowing
Medal record
Men's rowing
Representing Czechoslovakia
Olympic Games
Gold medal – first place	1952 Helsinki	Coxed four
European Championships
Gold medal – first place	1953 Copenhagen	Coxed four
Gold medal – first place	1956 Bled	Eight
Bronze medal – third place	1957 Duisburg	Eight

Miroslav Koranda (6 November 1934 – 6 October 2008) was a Czech coxswain who competed for Czechoslovakia in the 1952 and 1956 Summer Olympics.

He was born in Prague. In 1952 he coxed the Czechoslovak boat that won the gold medal in the coxed four event. Four years later he coxed the Czechoslovak boat that was eliminated in the semi-final of the eight competition.
