= Stanislav Lusk =

Czechoslovak rower (1931–1987)

Personal information
- Born: 12 November 1931 Třeboň, Czechoslovakia
- Died: 6 May 1987 (aged 55) Prague, Czechoslovakia

Sport
- Sport: Rowing
Medal record
Men's rowing
Representing Czechoslovakia
Olympic Games
Gold medal – first place	1952 Helsinki	Coxed four
Bronze medal – third place	1960 Rome	Eight
European Championships
Gold medal – first place	1953 Copenhagen	Coxed four
Bronze medal – third place	1954 Amsterdam	Coxed four
Gold medal – first place	1956 Bled	Eight
Bronze medal – third place	1957 Duisburg	Eight
Silver medal – second place	1959 Mâcon	Eight

Stanislav Lusk (12 November 1931 – 6 May 1987) was a Czech rower who competed for Czechoslovakia in the 1952 Summer Olympics, in the 1956 Summer Olympics, and in the 1960 Summer Olympics.

He was born in Třeboň and died in Prague.

In 1952 he was a crew member of the Czechoslovak boat which won the gold medal in the coxed fours event.

Four years later he was part of the Czechoslovak boat which was eliminated in the semi-final of the eight competition.

At the 1960 Games he won the bronze medal with the Czechoslovak boat in the eights event.
