= Bjørn Christoffersen =

Norwegian rower

Bjørn Christoffersen (3 November 1926 – 23 October 2013) was a Norwegian rower who competed in the 1952 Summer Olympics.
