= Porvoon maalaiskunta =

Porvoon maalaiskunta Porvoon maalaiskunta – Borgå landskommun
- Former municipality
- Coat of arms

- Country: Finland
- Region: Eastern Uusimaa
- Charter: 1866
- Consolidated: 1997
- Time zone: UTC+2 (EET)
  - Summer (DST): UTC+3 (EEST)

Porvoon maalaiskunta (Swedish: Borgå landskommun) is a former municipality of Finland. It was established in 1866 and it was located in Eastern Uusimaa around the city of Porvoo. The municipality was consolidated with Porvoo in 1997.

Neighbour municipalities were Askola, Myrskylä, Pernå (Finnish: Pernaja), Pornainen and Sipoo.

== Notable people ==
- Lauri Lehtinen, long distance runner
- Jussi Saramo
