= Bærum RK =

Rowing club in Bærum, Norway

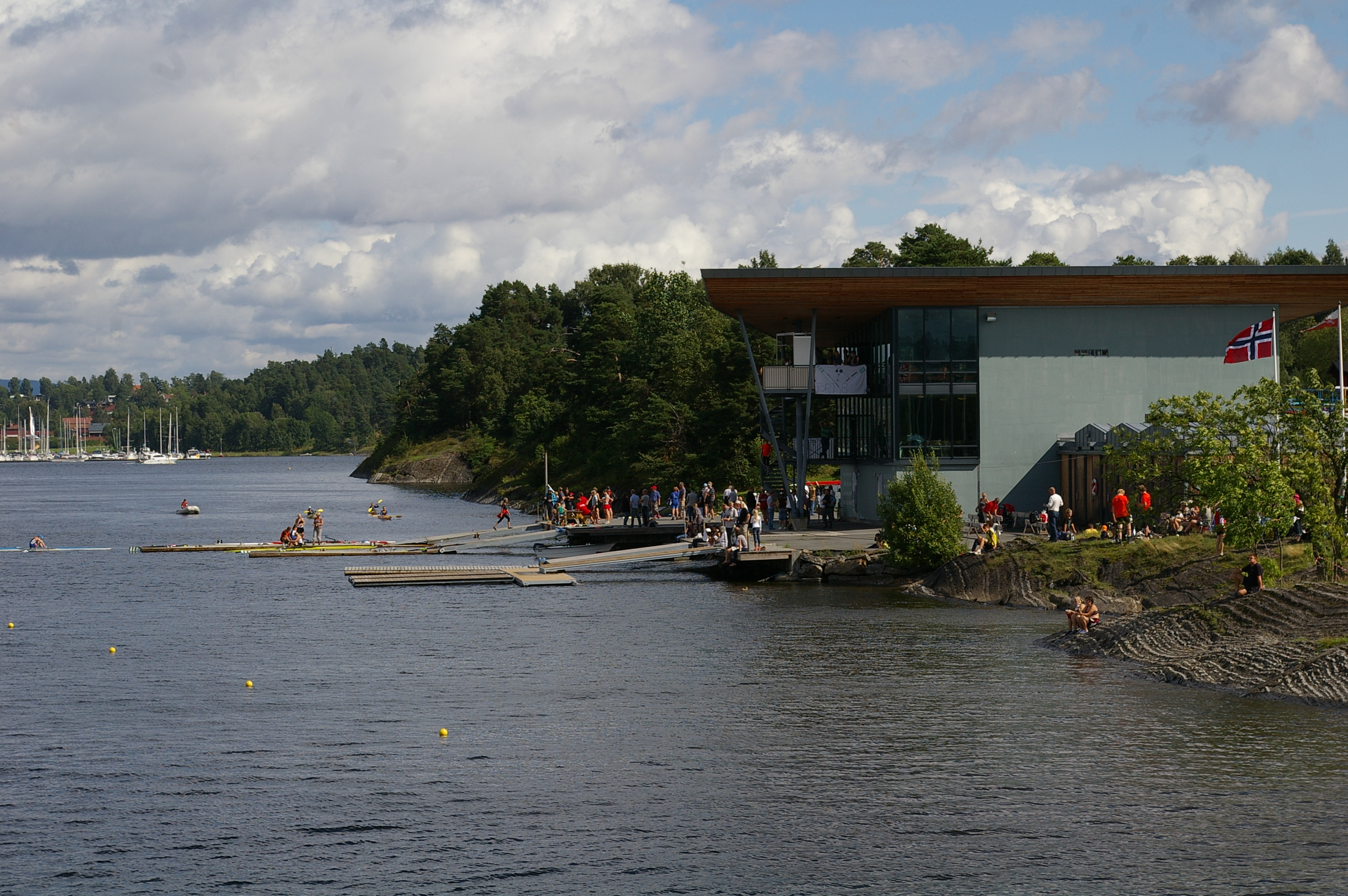
Boathouse

Bærum Roklubb is a sports club from Bærum, Norway.

Established in 1917, its only sport is sport rowing. It is based at Kalvøya outside Sandvika, and has shared the current locality with the canoeing club Bærum KK since 1972. Bærum RK originally had its own house at Kalvøya, but this was moved to Kadettangen in 1925, and sold in 1936 due to financial problems. Between 1936 and 1972 the rowing club used a house constructed on the tiny islet Danmark. In 1972 the new clubhouse on Kalvøya was finished and both Bærum rowing club and Bærum KK moved into the new clubhouse. The house was burned to the ground during a fire in 1996, but a new club house was opened in May 2000.

Well-known members include Ole Nafstad, Svein Nielsen and Vetle Vinje.

It was founded by physician Peter Torgersen, who was a leading proponent of "useful sports", the notion that sports practice should come in useful on other fields in life. For Bærum RK, this meant that the rowers used regular rowing boats. Torgersen wanted men to be able to escape in lifeboats, should they be on board a "torpedoed Norwegian ship". The Norwegian Rowing Association was strictly against this.

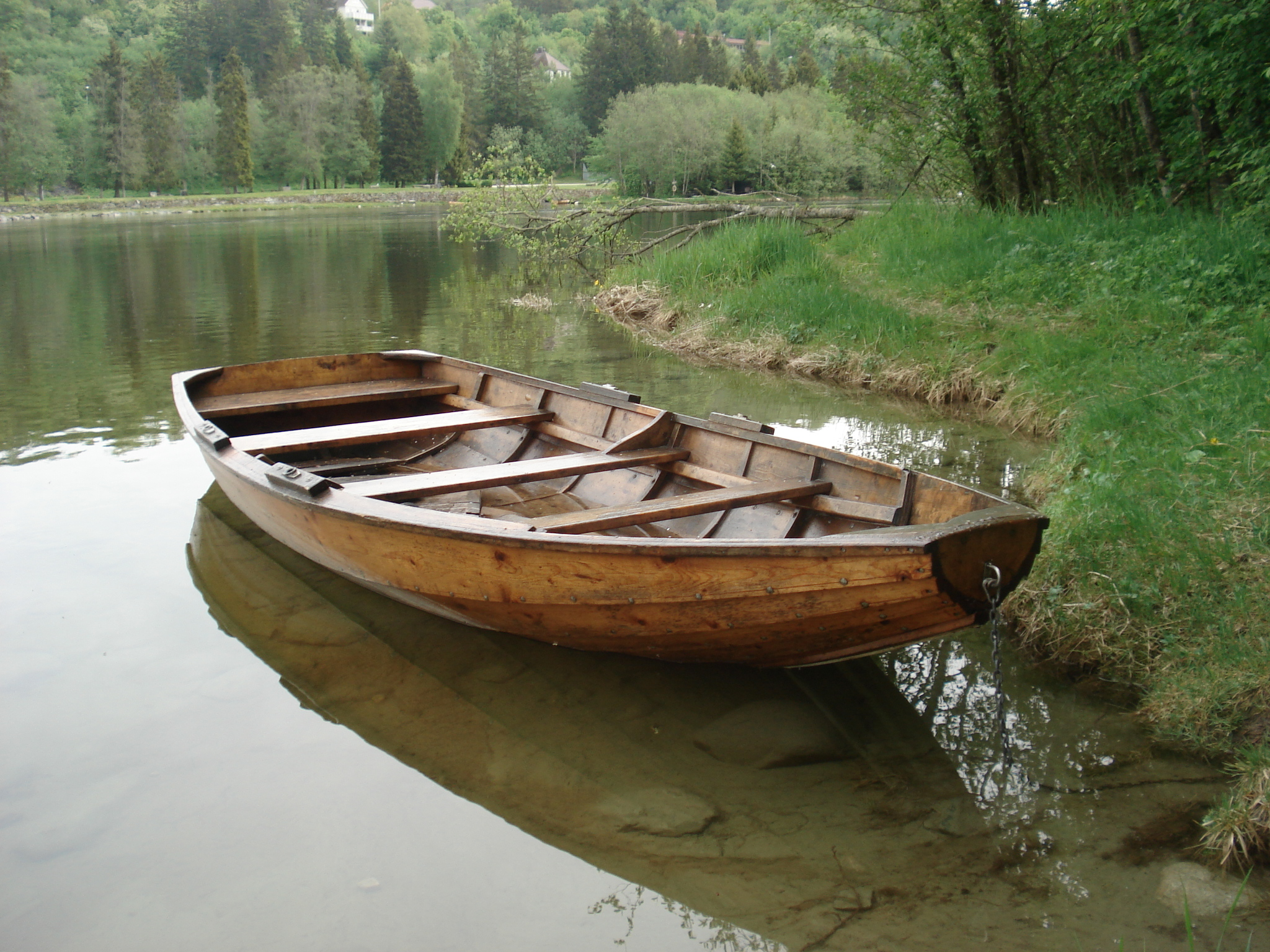
A regular Norwegian rowing boat.
