= Iceland at the 1948 Summer Olympics =

- IOC code: ISL
- NOC: Olympic Committee of Iceland

in London
- Competitors: 20 in 3 sports
- Flag bearer: Hermann Stefánsson
- Medals: Gold 0 Silver 0 Bronze 0 Total 0

Summer Olympics appearances (overview)
- 1908; 1912; 1920–1932; 1936; 1948; 1952; 1956; 1960; 1964; 1968; 1972; 1976; 1980; 1984; 1988; 1992; 1996; 2000; 2004; 2008; 2012; 2016; 2020; 2024; 2028

Iceland competed at the 1948 Summer Olympics in London, England. The country was represented by 1 man in Art competitions, 11 men in athletics and 5 men and 3 women in swimming.

== Results by event ==
=== Art competitions ===
- Ásgeir Bjarnþórsson (Mixed painting)

=== Athletics ===
Key

- Note – Ranks given for track events are within the athlete's heat only
- Q = Qualified for the next round
- q = Qualified for the next round as a fastest loser or, in field events, by position without achieving the qualifying target
- NR = National record
- N/A = Round not applicable for the event
- Bye = Athlete not required to compete in round

Men
Track & road events

Athlete	Event	Heat		Quarterfinals		Semifinal		Final	
Athlete	Event	Result	Rank	Result	Rank	Result	Rank	Result	Rank
Finnbjörn Þorvaldsson	100 m			did not advance					
Haukur Clausen	100 m	11.0	2		6	did not advance			
Haukur Clausen	200 m	22.2	3	did not advance					
Örn Clausen	100 m		4	did not advance					
Reynir Sigurðsson	400 m	51.4	3	did not advance					
Óskar Jónsson	800 m	1:55.4	4	—N/a		did not advance			
Óskar Jónsson	1500 m	4:03.2	6	—N/a				did not advance	
Ásmundur Bjarnason; Haukur Clausen; Trausti Eyjólfsson; Finnbjörn Þorvaldsson	4 × 100 m relay	42.9	4	—N/a				did not advance	

Field events

Athlete	Event	Qualification		Final	
Athlete	Event	Distance	Position	Distance	Position
Finnbjörn Þorvaldsson	long jump	6.860	14	did not advance	
Torfi Bryngeirsson	pole vault	3.80	14	did not advance	
Sigfús Sigurðsson	shot put	14.540	11	13.66	13
Vilhjálmur Vilmundarson	shot put	13.990	17	did not advance	
Jóel Sigurðsson	javelin throw	55.69	17	did not advance	

Combined events – Decathlon

Athlete	Event	100 m	LJ	SP	HJ	400 m	110H	DT	PV	JT	1500 m	Final	Rank
Örn Clausen	Result	11.1	6.545	12.87	1.8	54.7	16.0	36.34	3.2	44.16	5:07.0	6444	12
Örn Clausen	Points	814	686	703	786	639	776	606	575	484	375	6444	12

=== Swimming ===
Men

Athlete	Event	Heat		Semifinal		Final	
Athlete	Event	Time	Rank	Time	Rank	Time	Rank
Ari Guðmundsson	100 m freestyle	1:01.6	22	did not advance			
Ari Guðmundsson	400 m freestyle	5:16.2	29	did not advance			
Guðmundur Ingólfsson	100 m backstroke	1:19.4		did not advance			
Sigurður Jónsson	200 m breaststroke	2:50.6	14	2:52.4	14	did not advance	
Sigurður Th. Jónsson	200 m breaststroke	2:56.4	20	did not advance			
Atli Steinarsson	200 m breaststroke	3:02.3	29	did not advance			

Women

Athlete	Event	Heat		Semifinal		Final	
Athlete	Event	Time	Rank	Time	Rank	Time	Rank
Kolbrún Ólafsdóttir	100 m backstroke	1:25.6	21	did not advance			
Anna Ólafsdóttir	200 m breaststroke	3:19.9		did not advance			
Þórdís Árnadóttir	200 m breaststroke	3:26.1		did not advance			
