= Swimming at the 1948 Summer Olympics – Men's 200 metre breaststroke =

Men's 200 metre backstroke at the Games of the XIV Olympiad
- Venue: Wembley Arena
- Dates: 5 August 1948 (heats); 6 August 1948 (semifinals); 7 August 1948 (final)
- Competitors: 32 from 20 nations
- Winning time: 2:39.3 OR

Medalists
1st place, gold medalist(s)		Joe Verdeur	United States
2nd place, silver medalist(s)		Keith Carter	United States
3rd place, bronze medalist(s)		Bob Sohl	United States

The men's 200 metre breaststroke event at the 1948 Olympic Games took place between 5 and 7 August at the Empire Pool. This swimming event used the breaststroke. Because an Olympic-size swimming pool is 50 metres long, this race consisted of four lengths of the pool.

John Davies' time was recorded by the timekeepers to be 0.2s faster than the bronze medallist Bob Sohl of the United States. However, the judges believed that Sohl had touched first and awarded him the bronze.

== Results ==
=== Heats ===
Rank	Athlete	Country	Time	Notes
1	Joe Verdeur	United States	2:40.0	
2	Bob Sohl	United States	2:44.9	
3	Ahmed Kandil	Egypt	2:45.5	
4	Keith Carter	United States	2:46.3	
5	Tone Cerer	Yugoslavia	2:46.3	
6	Willy Otto Jordan	Brazil	2:46.4	
7	Sándor Németh	Hungary	2:48.2	
8	John Davies	Australia	2:48.3	
9	Bob Bonte	Netherlands	2:48.7	
10	Roy Romain	Great Britain	2:49.4	
11	Maurice Lusien	France	2:49.5	
12	Artem Nakache	France	2:50.4	
13	Walter Pavlicek	Austria	2:50.6	
14	Sigurður Jónsson	Iceland	2:50.6	
15	Apolonio Castillo	Mexico	2:50.7	
16	René Amabuyok	Philippines	2:52.6	
17	Jiří Linhart	Czechoslovakia	2:53.8	
18	Jacinto Cayco	Philippines	2:54.0	
19	Carlos Espejo	Argentina	2:55.0	
20	Sigurður Th. Jónsson	Iceland	2:56.4	
21	Hans Widmer	Switzerland	2:56.7	
22	Goldup Davies	Great Britain	2:56.6	
23	Walter Kunz	Switzerland	2:57.6	
24	Nicolas Wildhaber	Switzerland	2:59.2	
25	John Service	Great Britain	3:00.4	
26	César Benetti	Argentina	3:00.6	
27	Peter Salmon	Canada	3:01.5	
28	Kevin Hallett	Australia	3:02.0	
29	Atli Steinarsson	Iceland	3:02.3	
30	Des Cohen	South Africa	3:03.3	
31	Prafulla Mullick	India	3:14.9	
32	Iftikhar Ahmed Shah	Pakistan	3:28.1	

=== Semifinals ===
Rank	Athlete	Country	Time	Notes
1	Joe Verdeur	United States	2:40.7	Q
2	Keith Carter	United States	2:43.0	Q
3	Ahmed Kandil	Egypt	2:43.7	Q
4	Willy Otto Jordan	Brazil	2:43.9	Q
5	Bob Sohl	United States	2:44.4	Q
6	John Davies	Australia	2:44.8	q
7	Bob Bonte	Netherlands	2:47.0	Q
8	Tone Cerer	Yugoslavia	2:47.3	q
9	Sándor Németh	Hungary	2:48.1	
10	Roy Romain	Great Britain	2:49.6	
11	Walter Pavlicek	Austria	2:50.1	
12	Maurice Lusien	France	2:51.4	
13	René Amabuyok	Philippines	2:51.8	
14	Sigurður Jónsson	Iceland	2:52.4	
15	Apolonio Castillo	Mexico	2:53.5	
16	Artem Nakache	France	2:59.1	

=== Final ===
Rank	Athlete	Country	Time	Notes
1	Joe Verdeur	United States	2:39.3	OR
2	Keith Carter	United States	2:40.2	
3	Bob Sohl	United States	2:43.9	
4	John Davies	Australia	2:43.7	
5	Antun Cerer	Yugoslavia	2:46.1	
6	Willy Otto Jordan	Brazil	2:46.4	
7	Ahmed Kandil	Egypt	2:47.5	
8	Bob Bonte	Netherlands	2:47.6	

Key: OR = Olympic record
