= Pavlíček =

Pavlíček (feminine Pavlíčková) is a Czech surname, a diminutive of the name Pavel. Notable people with the surname include:

- Michaela Pavlíčková (born 1977), Czech basketball player
- Michal Pavlíček (born 1956), Czech guitarist, composer, singer and lyricist
- Petrus Pavlicek (1902–1982), Austrian priest
- Richard Pavlicek (born 1945), American bridge player, teacher and writer
- Walter Pavlicek (1926–2004), Austrian swimmer
