= Keith Carter (swimmer) =

American swimmer (1924–2013)

Personal information
- Full name: Keith Eyre Carter
- National team: United States
- Born: August 30, 1924 Akron, Ohio, U.S.
- Died: May 3, 2013 (aged 88) Asheville, North Carolina, U.S.
- Height: 6 ft 2 in (1.88 m)
- Weight: 195 lb (88 kg)

Sport
- Sport: Swimming
- Strokes: Breaststroke, freestyle
- College team: Purdue University
Medal record
Men's swimming
Representing the United States
Olympic Games
Silver medal – second place	1948 London	200 m breaststroke
Amateur Athletic Union
Gold medal – first place	1949 Indoor Championships	220 yd breaststroke.
NCAA
Gold medal – first place	1949 Championships	200 m Breaststroke.
Silver medal – second place	1949 Championships	150 yd Individual Medley.
Big Ten
Gold medal – first place	1949 Championships	200 m Breaststroke
Gold medal – first place	1949 Championships	150 m Individual Medley
Gold medal – first place	1948 Championships	200 m Breaststroke
Gold medal – first place	1948 Championships	50 m Freestyle

Keith Eyre Carter (August 30, 1924 – May 3, 2013) was an American competition swimmer, a six time All American, an Olympic silver medalist and world record holder in the 200 yard breaststroke (long course).

Carter was an unusually gifted swimmer in both free style and breaststroke events. At the 1948 Olympic trials, he was second behind Wally Ris in the 100 m freestyle, and second behind Joe Verdeur in the 200 m breaststroke. Carter tried out for the 4 X 200 m freestyle relay and was one of several swimmers who had already qualified in other events who slowed down in their heats or swam fast in the prelims and scratched themselves for the final to allow more swimmers to qualify for the US Olympic Team.

At the 1948 Summer Olympics in London, Carter received a silver medal in the 200 m breaststroke in a three-man American sweep of the event behind Joe Verdeur the gold medalist and ahead of Robert Sohl the bronze medalist. In the men's 100 m freestyle, Carter finished fourth in the event final behind his teammates Wally Ris the gold medalist and Alan Ford the silver medalist, thus narrowly missing another American sweep of this event as well.

In 1949, Carter was the NCAA champion in the 200-yard breaststroke, National AAU Indoor 220 yd breaststroke champion and both times over his rival Joe Verdeur. He did not compete in the 1949 National AAU Outdoor championships.

No other swimmer in the pre bifurcation era of the breaststroke and butterfly events prior to 1953, was able to compete in both freestyle and butterfly (breaststroke/butterfly) events and obtain as high a ranking internationally (2nd in breaststroke/4th in the 100 freestyle in the Olympics) in both events as is common today with the butterfly swimmers now using the dolphin kick.

Carter attended Purdue University, where he majored in electrical engineering, and swam for the Purdue Boilermakers. Before enrolling at Purdue, Carter served in the United States Army Air Forces for three years as a bombardier during World War II.

Carter was also a Masters swimmer, breaking the world record in the 100 short course meters fly in the 65-69 age group in 1990 with a 1:24.43.

Carter died May 3, 2013; he was 88 years old.

Records
Preceded by Joe Verdeur	Men's 200-yard breaststroke world record-holder (long course); 1949 – February 21, 1952	Succeeded by Bowen Stassforth

Records
Preceded by James Counsilman	Men's 300-yard breaststroke American record-holder (long course); May 10, 1948 – June 20, 1952	Succeeded by Bowen Stassforth

== See also ==
- List of Olympic medalists in swimming (men)
- List of Purdue University people
