= Swimming at the 1952 Summer Olympics – Men's 200 metre breaststroke =

Men's 200 metre breaststroke at the Games of the XV Olympiad
- Venue: Helsinki Swimming Stadium
- Date: 31 July 1952 (heats & semifinals); 2 August 1952 (final)
- Competitors: 40 from 27 nations
- Winning time: 2:34.4 OR

Medalists
1st place, gold medalist(s)		John Davies	Australia
2nd place, silver medalist(s)		Bowen Stassforth	United States
3rd place, bronze medalist(s)		Herbert Klein	Germany

The men's 200 metre breaststroke event at the 1952 Olympic Games took place between 31 July and 2 August at the Swimming Stadium. This swimming event used the breaststroke. Because an Olympic size swimming pool is 50 metres long, this race consisted of four lengths of the pool.

== Results ==
=== Heats ===
16 fastest swimmer advanced to semifinals.

Heat 1

Rank	Athlete	Country	Time	Note
1	Monte Nitzkowski	United States	2:40.6	
2	Pierre Joly dit Dumesnil	France	2:43.4	
3	Marek Petrusewicz	Poland	2:44.0	
4	Juha Tikka	Finland	2:46.3	
5	Brian Barnes	Great Britain	2:48.6	
6	René Kohn	Luxembourg	2:59.3	

Heat 2

Rank	Athlete	Country	Time	Note
1	John Davies	Australia	2:39.7	
2	Jiro Nagasawa	Japan	2:40.4	
3	Nikola Trojanović	Yugoslavia	2:42.4	
4	Bengt Rask	Sweden	2:45.3	
5	Ludovicus Schoenmaekers	Belgium	2:46.5	
6	Yury Kurchashov	Soviet Union	2:47.3	
7	Alfons Oehy	Switzerland	2:54.8	
8	Muhammad Bashir	Pakistan	3:01.3	

Heat 3

Rank	Athlete	Country	Time	Note
1	Ľudovít Komadel	Czechoslovakia	2:38.9	
2	Orlando Cossani	Argentina	2:39.6	
3	Takayoshi Kajikawa	Japan	2:39.6	
4	Walter Ocampo	Mexico	2:44.8	
5	Octavio Mobiglia	Brazil	2:46.1	
6	Giorgio Grilz	Italy	–	disqualified

Heat 4

Rank	Athlete	Country	Time	Note
1	Bowen Stassforth	United States	2:39.3	
2	David Hawkins	Australia	2:41.2	
3	George Portelance	Canada	2:42.5	
4	Pyotr Skripchenkov	Soviet Union	2:47.3	
5	Blago Barbieri	Yugoslavia	2:47.3	
6	Knud Gleie	Denmark	2:51.4	
7	Vladimír Skovajsa	Czechoslovakia	2:53.3	

Heat 5

Rank	Athlete	Country	Time	Note
1	Jerry Holan	United States	2:36.8	
2	Maurice Lusien	France	2:40.9	
3	Nobuyasu Hirayama	Japan	2:41.5	
4	Adhemar Grijó Filho	Brazil	2:47.6	
5	Habib Suharko	Indonesia	2:51.3	

Heat 6

Rank	Athlete	Country	Time	Note
1	Herbert Klein	Germany	2:37.0	
2	Daan Buijze	Netherlands	2:41.9	
3	Vladimir Borisenko	Soviet Union	2:43.2	
4	Aulis Kähkönen	Finland	2:43.8	
5	Manuel Sanguily	Cuba	2:44.5	
6	Vlastimil Linhart	Czechoslovakia	2:48.0	
7	Awad Moukhtar Halloudah	Egypt	2:50.5	
8	Eduardo Barbeiro	Portugal	3:04.6	

=== Semifinals ===
Eight fastest swimmers advanced to final.

Semifinal 1

Rank	Athlete	Country	Time	Note
1	John Davies	Australia	2:36.8	
2	Ľudovít Komadeľ	Czechoslovakia	2:38.8	
3	Nobuyasu Hirayama	Japan	2:39.1	
4	Gerald Holan	United States	2:39.2	
5	Monte Nitzkowski	United States	2:41.4	
6	Daan Buijze	Netherlands	2:42.6	
7	Orlando Cossani	Argentina	2:43.1	
8	George Portelance	Canada	2:43.8	

Semifinal 2

Rank	Athlete	Country	Time	Note
1	Herbert Klein	Germany	2:37.0	
2	Takayoshi Kajikawa	Japan	2:37.3	
3	Bowen Stassforth	United States	2:38.7	
4	Jiro Nagasawa	Japan	2:39.0	
5	Maurice Lusien	France	2:39.1	
6	David Hawkins	Australia	2:39.8	
7	Nikola Trojanović	Yugoslavia	2:41.8	
8	Vladimir Borisenko	Soviet Union	2:46.2	

=== Final ===
Rank	Athlete	Country	Time	Notes
1	John Davies	Australia	2:34.4	OR
2	Bowen Stassforth	United States	2:34.7	
3	Herbert Klein	Germany	2:35.9	
4	Nobuyasu Hirayama	Japan	2:37.4	
5	Takayoshi Kajikawa	Japan	2:38.6	
6	Jiro Nagasawa	Japan	2:39.1	
7	Maurice Lusien	France	2:39.8	
8	Ľudovít Komadeľ	Czechoslovakia	2:40.1	

Key: OR = Olympic record
