= Sigurður =

Sigurður (Icelandic pronunciation: [ˈsɪːɣˌʏrðʏr̥]) or Sigurdur is an Icelandic masculine given name. Notable people with the name include:

- Sigurður Bergmann (born 1961), Icelandic judoka
- Sigurður Bjarnason (handballer) (born 1970), Icelandic handball player
- Sigurður Bjarnason (politician) (1915–2012), Icelandic politician and diplomat
- Sigurður Bragason (born 1954), Icelandic baritone
- Sigurður Breiðfjörð (1798–1846), Icelandic poet
- Sigurður Eggerz (1875–1945), Icelandic politician
- Sigurður Einarsson (handballer) (born 1943), Icelandic handball player
- Sigurður Einarsson (javelin thrower) (born 1962), Icelandic javelin thrower
- Sigurður Einarsson (economist) (born 1960), Icelandic banker
- Sigurður Ragnar Eyjólfsson (born 1973), Icelandic footballer and manager
- Sigurður Grétarsson (born 1962), Icelandic footballer
- Sigurður Guðjónsson (born 1975), Icelandic contemporary artist
- Sigurður Guðmundsson (born 1942), Icelandic artist
- Sigurður Gunnarsson (born 1959), Icelandic handball player
- Sigurdur Helgason (airline executive) (1921–2009), Icelandic airline executive
- Sigurður Helgason (mathematician) (1927–2023), Icelandic mathematician
- Sigurður Helgason (basketball) (born 1940), Icelandic basketball player and coach
- Sigurður Ingimundarson (born 1966), Icelandic basketball coach and player
- Sigurður Ingi Jóhannsson (born 1962), Prime Minister of Iceland from 2016 to 2017
- Sigurður Jónsson (footballer) (born 1966), Icelandic footballer and coach
- Sigurður Jónsson (swimmer) (1922–2019), Icelandic swimmer
- Sigurður Jónsson (alpine skier) (1959–1996), Icelandic alpine skier
- Sigurður Páll Jónsson (born 1958), Icelandic politician
- Sigurður Th. Jónsson (1924–2003), Icelandic swimmer
- Sigurður Kárason (born 2009), Icelandic footballer
- Sigurður Kári Kristjánsson (born 1973), Icelandic politician
- Sigurður Egill Lárusson (born 1992), Icelandic footballer
- Sigurður Gylfi Magnússon (born 1957), Icelandic historian specialising in microhistory
- Sigurður Nordal (1886–1974), Icelandic academic
- Sigurður Ólafsson (footballer) (1916–2009), Icelandic footballer
- Sigurður Ólafsson (swimmer) (born 1954), Icelandic swimmer
- Sigurður Helgi Pálmason, Icelandic politician
- Sigurður Pálsson (1948–2017), Icelandic writer
- Sigurður Sigurðsson (1914–1982), Icelandic athlete
- Sigurður Sigurjónsson (born 1955), Icelandic actor, comedian and screenwriter
- Sigurður Sveinsson (born 1959), Icelandic handball player
- Sigurdur Thordarson (born 1992), Icelandic hacker, informant and criminal
- Sigurður S. Thoroddsen (1902–1983), Icelandic politician
- Sigurður Þórarinsson (1912–1983), Icelandic geologist, volcanologist and glaciologist
- Sigurður Þorsteinsson (born 1988), Icelandic basketball player
- Sigurður Þorvaldsson (born 1980), Icelandic basketball player
