= Skovajsa =

Skovajsa is a Slovak surname. Notable people with the surname include:

- Lukáš Skovajsa (born 1994), Slovak footballer
- Vladimír Skovajsa (1929–2002), Slovak swimmer
