= Robert Brawner =

American swimmer (1929–2022)

Personal information
- Full name: Robert Lowry Brawner
- Nickname: "Ace"
- National team: United States
- Born: November 22, 1929 San Francisco, California, U.S.
- Died: August 30, 2022 (aged 92)
- Height: 6 ft 4 in (1.93 m)
- Weight: 165 lb (75 kg)

Sport
- Sport: Swimming
- Strokes: Breaststroke
- College team: Princeton University
Medal record
Representing the United States
US vs. Japan Dual Meets
Gold medal – first place	1950 Osaka	200 yd breaststroke
Gold medal – first place	1950 Osaka	100 yd breaststroke
Silver medal – second place	1950 Tokyo	100 yd breaststroke

Robert Lowry Brawner (November 22, 1929 – August 30, 2022) was an American swimmer for Princeton University who held a world record in the 200-yard (short course) breaststroke and held four American records.

== Biography ==
Brawner was born on November 22, 1929. A four-time All-American in swimming at Princeton University, he was the Eastern Intercollegiate League Champion for three years 1950-1952 in the 200 yd/220 yd breaststroke. Brawner was also the double NCAA champion in the 100 yd and 200 yd/220 yd breaststroke for 1950 and 1951.

In his first American record came in 1949 with the 200 yard breaststroke (20 yard) with a time of 2:16.7. His world record came in 1950 at the Eastern Intercollegiate Championships in the 200 yd breaststroke (short course) beating the former record holder Joe Verdeur in 2:14.2.

At the National AAU Indoor Championships in 1950, Brawner won the 220 yd breaststroke (short course) and set the American record in 2:29.3 beating the former record holder Joe Verdeur who was second in 2:29.4. This race was dual timed for both the 200 meter and 220 yard distances (short course). During the race, Verdeur broke the world record for 200 meters with a time of 2:28.3. Although this was the fastest 220 yard breaststroke (short course) in history, it stood only as the American record since FINA only recognized the 200 yard and 200 meter distances for world record purposes.

Brawner set another American record in the summer of 1950 in the 220 yd breaststroke (long course) at the National AAU Outdoor Championships when Brawner won in a time of 2:41 flat beating Bowen Stassforth who was second in 2:41.3. He was selected in 1950 as part of the American national swim team in several dual meets held in Japan. This was the first time the American swim team had defeated Japan on Japanese soil. At the second dual meet held in Osaka, Brawner won the 100 yd breaststroke and 200 yd breaststroke.

At the 1951 National AAU Outdoor Championships in the 100 m breaststroke (long course), Brawner was second to John Davies, but set the American record in the 100 m breaststroke (long course) in the preliminaries with a time of 1:08.3 At the 1952 US Olympic Trials, Brawner was seventh in the 200 m Breaststroke with a time of 2:44.9. Brawner died on August 30, 2022, at the age of 92.

== Record notes ==
The world record for the 200 meter breaststroke prior the bifurcation of the butterfly breaststroke into separate strokes in 1953 could be accomplished in either short or long course pools. FINA recognized only one world record for the 200 meter breaststroke. Brawner held the following records in his career:

- 200 yd breaststroke American Record (20 yard course), March 18, 1950 – June 20, 1952
- World record 200 yd breaststroke (short course), March 17, 1950 – March 29, 1952
- 220 yd breaststroke American record progression (long course), July 22, 1950 – August 27, 1952
- 220 yd breaststroke American record (short course), March 31, 1950 – April 4, 1952

== National competitions ==
- Amateur Athletic Union Outdoor Championships
  - (gold) 220 yd breaststroke (1950)
  - (silver) 100 m breaststroke (1951)
  - (silver) 100 m breaststroke (1949)
  - (bronze) 200 m breaststroke (1951)
- AAU Indoor Championships
  - (gold) 220 yd breaststroke (1950)
  - (silver) 220 yd breaststroke (1951)
  - (silver) 100 yd breaststroke (1951)
  - (bronze) 200 m breaststroke (1949)
- NCAA Championships
  - (gold) 220 yd breaststroke (1951)
  - (gold) 100 yd breaststroke (1951)
  - (gold) 200 yd breaststroke (1950)
  - (gold) 100 yd breaststroke (1950)
  - (silver) 100 yd breaststroke (1952)
  - (bronze) 200 yd breaststroke (1952)
- Eastern Intercollegiate League Championships
  - (gold) 200 yd breaststroke (1952)
  - (gold) 100 yd breaststroke (1952)
  - (gold) 220 yd breaststroke (1951)
  - (gold) 200 yd breaststroke (1950)
  - (gold) 100 yd breaststroke (1950)

Records
Preceded by Joe Verdeur	Men's 200 yd breaststroke American Record(20 yard course); March 18, 1950-June 20, 1952	Succeeded by Bowen Stassforth
Preceded by Joe Verdeur	Men's 200 yd breaststroke World record-holder(short course); March 17, 1950-March 29, 1952	Succeeded by John Davies
Preceded by Bill Lucas	Men's 220 yd breaststroke American record-holder(long course); July 22, 1950-August 27, 1952	Succeeded by Jerry Holan
Preceded by Joe Verdeur	Men's 220 yd breaststroke American record-holder(short course); March 31, 1950-April 4, 1952	Succeeded by John Davies
