= Herbert Klein (swimmer) =

German swimmer

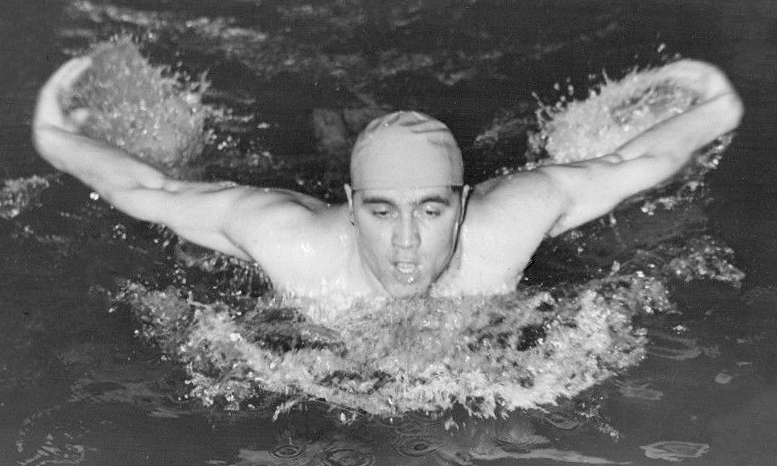
- Klein in 1951

Personal information
- Born: 25 March 1923 Breslau, Weimar Republic
- Died: 25 September 2001 (aged 78) Munich, Germany

Sport
- Sport: Swimming
- Events: Breaststroke, butterfly
- Club: Verein für volkstümliches Schwimmen, Munich
Medal record
Representing Germany
Olympic Games
Bronze medal – third place	1952 Helsinki	200 m breaststroke
European Championships
Gold medal – first place	1950 Vienna	200 m breaststroke

Herbert Klein (German pronunciation: [ˈhɛʁbɛʁt ˈklaɪ̯n]; 25 March 1923 – 25 September 2001) was a German swimmer. Competing in the 200 m breaststroke, he won the European title in 1950 and an Olympic bronze medal in 1952. During his career, he concurrently held two world records in the 200 m breaststroke in short course with a time of 2:27.3, long course with a time of 2:34.4, one world record in the 100 m breaststroke with a time of 1:05.5, and a world record in the 500 m breaststroke with a time of 7:07.3. In 1950, he was elected German Sportspersonality of the year.

FINA at the time recognized world records in the 200 m breaststroke that were set in either short course (25 meter) or long course (50 meter) pools. As a result, his world record (short course) with a time of 2:27.3 in the 200 m breaststroke set in 1951 was the only one widely known. His long course record set in 1950 with a time of 2:34.4, was preceded by Joe Verdeur in 1948 who swam with a time of 2:36.3 at the US Olympic Trials.

At the 1952 Olympics in Helsinki, Finland, he easily qualified for the final of the 200-meter breaststroke. This was the first Olympics since 1936 in Berlin that German and Japanese athletes could compete as the 1940 and 1944 Olympics were cancelled and Germany and Japan were banned from participating in 1948. In the Olympic final, Klein was third behind Australian John Davies the gold medalist and American Bowen Stassforth. His world record in the 200 m breaststroke (long course) of 2:34.4 was equaled by John Davies in the final. Davies, Stassforth, and Klein were the only three swimmers in history to better 2:35 in the 200 m breaststroke (long course) prior to the bifurcation of the stroke in 1953.

He also competed at the 1956 Summer Olympics in the 200 m breaststroke. This was the first Olympics after the breaststroke stroke was bifurcated in 1953 into two strokes-the contemporary underwater breaststroke with a frog kick and the butterfly stroke with the over the water arm motion using the dolphin kick. Unfortunately, he was disqualified after finishing first in the second heat for using an illegal scissors kick in the breaststroke.

During World War II Klein served as a combat swimmer in the German Kriegsmarine, he was captured near Rimini in September 1944 after an attack on Allied ships and became a prisoner of War. While a prisoner of war at POW Camp 115, Whitecross, St Columb Major in Cornwall England, he trained in a mud pool next to the camp. In 1947, after seeing posters plastered all around Cornwall regarding a swimming race, he petitioned his captors if he could enter the Cornwall Swimming Championships held in Fowey harbour. Initially, his British captors were skeptical of his abilities to even swim. After additional petitioning by his fellow prisoners, he was allowed to enter the race. He won by a substantial margin and was given a cardboard case as a prize. He was released a year later in 1948.

== Record Notes ==
The world record for the 200 meter breaststroke prior to the bifurcation of the butterfly breaststroke into separate strokes in 1953 could be accomplished in either short or long course pools. FINA recognized only one world record for the 200 meter breaststroke. The 1952 US Olympic Book lists the 200 meter breaststroke world record as belonging to Herbert Klein with a time of 2:27.3 who swam it in a short course pool. If records were measured as they are today in long and short course pools, John Davies tied Herbert Klein's long course world record of 2:34.4 set in 1950 at their 1952 Olympic final.

== See also ==
- List of select Jewish swimmers
- World record progression 200 metres breaststroke

Records
Preceded by Joe Verdeur	Men's 200 m breaststroke(Short Course); World record-holder June 9, 1951 – 1953	Succeeded by Stroke Discontinued
Preceded by Alfred Nakache	Men's 200-meter breaststroke world record-holder (long course); August 13, 1950 – 1953	Succeeded by Stroke Discontinued Shared with John Davies
