= Bowen Stassforth =

American swimmer (1926–2019)

Bowen Dow Stassforth
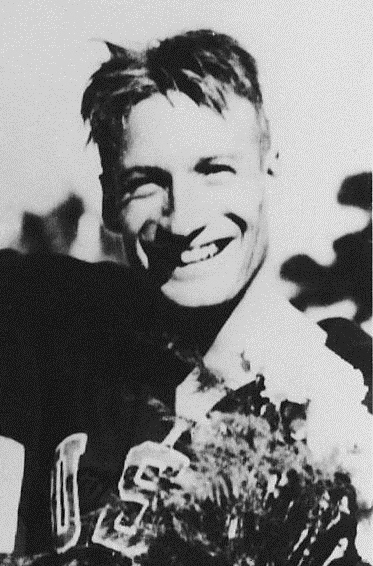
- Stassforth in Olympic warmup in 1952

Personal information
- Full name: Bowen Dow Stassforth
- National team: United States
- Born: August 7, 1926 Los Angeles, California, U.S.
- Died: November 22, 2019 (aged 93) Rancho Palos Verdes, California, U.S.
- Occupation: Insurance executive
- Height: 5 ft 10 in (1.78 m)
- Weight: 173 lb (78 kg)
- Spouse: Corinne Marjorie Batsche
- Children: 5

Sport
- Sport: Swimming
- Strokes: Breaststroke
- Club: Los Angeles Athletic Club; Hollywood Athletic Club
- College team: University of Iowa
- Coach: David Armbruster (U. Iowa); James Counsilman (U. Iowa)
Medal record
Representing the United States
Olympic Games
Silver medal – second place	1952 Helsinki	200 m breaststroke
Pan American Games
Gold medal – first place	1951 Buenos Aires	3×100 m medley
Bronze medal – third place	1951 Buenos Aires	200 m breaststroke
US vs. Japan Dual Meets
Gold medal – first place	1950 Osaka	100 m breaststroke
Gold medal – first place	1950 Osaka	300 y medley relay
Silver medal – second place	1950 Osaka	200 y breaststroke
Silver medal – second place	1950 Osaka	100 y breaststroke
Silver medal – second place	1950 Osaka	50 y breaststroke
Gold medal – first place	1950 Tokyo	100 m breaststroke.
Bronze medal – third place	1950 Tokyo	200 m breaststroke
Amateur Athletic Union
Gold medal – first place	1952 Outdoor Championships	220 yd breaststroke
Silver medal – second place	1952 Outdoor Championships	110 yd breaststroke
Bronze medal – third place	1952 Indoor Championships	220 yd breaststroke
Bronze medal – third place	1952 Indoor Championships	100 yd breaststroke
Silver medal – second place	1951 Outdoor Championships	200 m breaststroke
Silver medal – second place	1950 Outdoor Championships	220 yd breaststroke
Silver medal – second place	1950 Outdoor Championships	3×110 yd medley
Bronze medal – third place	1950 Indoor Championships	220 yd breaststroke
Bronze medal – third place	1950 Indoor Championships	3×110 yd medley
Bronze medal – third place	1949 Outdoor Championships	200 m breaststroke}
Gold medal – first place	1949 Outdoor Championships	3×100 m medley
Silver medal – second place	1949 Indoor Championships	3×100 yd medley
Bronze medal – third place	1946 Indoor Championships	3×100 m medley
Silver medal – second place	1945 Outdoor Championships	200 m breaststroke
NCAA
Bronze medal – third place	1952 Championships	100 yd breaststroke
Bronze medal – third place	1950 Championships	200 yd breaststroke
Bronze medal – third place	1950 Championships	100 yd breaststroke ({MedalSilver
Gold medal – first place	1949 Championships	3×100 m medley
Big Ten
Silver medal – second place	1952 Championships	200 yd Breaststroke
Bronze medal – third place	1952 Championships	100 yd Breaststroke
Silver medal – second place	1950 Championships	200 yd Breaststroke
Silver medal – second place	1950 Championships	100 yd Breaststroke
Silver medal – second place	1949 Championships	200 yd Breaststroke
Gold medal – first place	1949 Championships	3X100 yd Medley Relay

Bowen Dow Stassforth (August 7, 1926 – November 22, 2019) was an American competition swimmer who swam for the University of Iowa and won a silver medal in the 200 m breaststroke at the 1952 Olympics. He set two world records in the 200-yard (long course) breaststroke, and one world record in the 100 meter (long course) breaststroke. After retiring from his swimming career, he worked over fifty years in his family insurance business, and lived most of the remainder of his life in Rancho Palos Verdes, California.

== Early life ==
Stassforth was born in Los Angeles on August 7, 1926 to Adelaide Dow and Howard P. Stassforth. As a young child, he had an intense fear of water, as his early caretaker once put his head under water to familiarize him with the need to swim. After his parents discovered this, they began swimming lessons for Bowen with a number of instructors, none of whom could succeed in overcoming his fear of water. Finally, fundamental swim instruction and continuing lessons with Thelma Payne of the Los Angeles Athletic Club were able to help him overcome his fear of water. He trained and competed as a swimmer at Los Angeles High School (1942–44) and the Hollywood Athletic Club during which time he finished second at the 1943 California State Meet in the 200 yard breaststroke to his teammate Harry Messenheimer.

Bowen swam in the era when the accepted arm motion of the breaststroke was optional with either the contemporary breaststroke underwater arm recovery or the over the water arm motion for recovering the arms after catching the water. No butterfly stroke yet existed in competition. The leg movement for the breaststroke was and would remain the frog kick, also known as the whip kick. In 1953, the breaststroke was separated into two strokes, the breaststroke which used the frog kick, and the butterfly which used the dolphin kick. Stassforth's breastroke recovery placed his elbows out of the water and over his head, which has since been outlawed as part of the breaststroke. Since Stassforth used the breastroke recovery which placed his elbows out of the water, the breaststroke records he held were removed from the record books.

=== U.S. Navy ===
In August 1944, while still in high school, Bowen enlisted in the U.S. Navy. As his vision was poor, to aid him in gaining admission to the service, he memorized the eye chart for his initial physical. During basic training, his vision problems were discovered by his superiors, who learned of his former success as a club and high school swimmer. To restrict his range of service due to his vision and remove him from active duty, Stafforth was assigned to teach swimming and water survival skills to enlisted sailors on North Island in San Diego. He was honorably discharged in 1946.

=== National AAU competitions 1945-1949 ===
At his first AAU National Outdoor Championship meet in 1945, representing Fleet Air Wing 14, he placed second in the 200-meter breaststroke. The next year in 1946, he placed sixth in both the AAU National Indoor and Outdoor Championship 220y/200M breaststroke behind Joe Verdeur, Charles Keating and his future coach, James Counsilman. In 1949, Bowen moved up the standings finishing third in the AAU Outdoor Championships 200 m breaststroke behind Keith Carter and Joe Verdeur the previous years' Olympic silver and gold medalists.

== University of Iowa ==
He enrolled at the University of Iowa for the 1947–1948 school year and was coached by both David Armbruster and his assistant coach James "Doc" Counsilman, who would later coach at the University of Indiana and become a Hall of Fame recipient. Stafforth was not allowed to compete as a freshman, however, due to conference eligibility rules at that time. He swam for Iowa during 1949, 1950, and 1952. While enrolled at Iowa, he was awarded all-American honors in eight years and was a member of a 400 meter medley relay team that won a gold medal. In 1952, he received a most valuable award for athletes in Iowa by the American Athletic Union.

Having already enrolled at the University of Iowa, Stassforth participated in the U.S. Olympic Trials in July, 1948 placing seventh in the 200-meter breaststroke with a time of 2:47.7.

=== International competition ===
As a result of his success as a collegiate competitor at Iowa, Stassforth was invited to his first international competition as part of the U.S. National Swim Team in 1950, and participated in several meets held in Japan. This was the first time the American swim team had defeated Japan on Japanese soil. At the dual meet in Tokyo, Bowen set the world record in the 100 m breaststroke(long course) in 1:09.4 barely edging out his teammate Robert Brawner. Later that year, he was second in the National AAU Outdoor Championships in the 220 yard breaststroke to Robert Brawner.

In 1951, he won a bronze medal in the 200-meter breaststroke with a time of 2:47.6 and a gold in the medley relay at the 1951 Pan American Games in Buenos Aires. At the 1951 National AAU Outdoor Championships in the 200 m breaststroke, Bowen was second to John Davies but ahead of Robert Brawner, who placed third and Jerry Holan, who placed fourth.

== 1952 Olympic silver medal ==
While at U. of Iowa, after a fourth place finish behind John Davies, Jerry Holan, and Robert Brawner at the NCAA finals in 1952 in the 200 yard Breaststroke, his Big Ten rival and friend, John Davies informed Bowen he should making adjustments to his training regiment. After heeding Davies's advice, Stassforth qualified first overall at the 1952 US Olympic Trials beating trial competitors Brawner and Holan and breaking Joe Verdeur's American citizen record with a time of 2:36.0 in the 200 m breaststroke.

At the 1952 Summer Olympics in Helsinki, Finland, he qualified for the finals of the 200 m breaststroke. While on the starting blocks of the finals, the cold air caused his muscles to tense up. In order to counter act this, he purposely false started using the short time in the water to loosen back up. Back up on the blocks, he was careful not to false start again. When the race was over, he placed second for the silver, touched out by only 0.3 of a second to gold medalist and Big Ten rival and friend John Davies of the University of Michigan who represented Australia. His time of 2:34.7 set a new American record for the 200 m breaststroke (long course).Herbert Klein the world record holder in the 200 m breaststroke in both short and long courses was third. Davies, Stassforth, and Klein were the only three swimmers to better 2:35 in history in the 200 m breaststroke (long course) prior to the bifurcation of the stroke in 1953.

He finished his career as the National AAU Outdoor Champion and the American record holder in the 220-yard breaststroke with the same time of 2:34.7 that he swam in the Olympics. After the race, Bowen remarked, "Up till now I never felt that I had done my best. Now I'm satisfied. That was it."

=== American Records ===
In 1952, as shown in the table below, at the conclusion of Stassforth's career, he concurrently held 16 national breaststroke records in distances from 200 yards to 500 meters in 20 yard, short course and long course pools.

=== Post swimming life ===
Stassforth worked in his family's insurance business beginning in the 1950's where he served over fifty years. He married his wife Corinne Marjorie Batsche on the afternoon of November 24, 1954 at St. Thomas Aquinus Church in Cincinnati, Ohio. Marjorie was a graduate of the University of Cincinnati where she was a member of Theta Phi Alpha. The couple would have five children.

Stassforth died in Rancho Palos, Verdes, California at the age of 93 on November 22, 2019. His wife Marjorie had predeceased him in 2016. He had lived in Rancho Palos Verdes since 1957, not long after his retirement as a swimming competitor. Memorial services were held at Green Hills Memorial Park in Rancho Palos Verdes where he was buried.

== Honors ==
He was the 1952 Iowa AAU Athlete of the Year and Iowa AAU's nominee for the James E. Sullivan Award. Bowen was inducted into the University of Iowa Hall of Fame in 1996.

Charles Roeser, the chairman of the U.S. Olympic men's swimming committee in a letter to his coach David Armbruster, called Bowen “one of the most cooperative athletes I have ever known in thirty years of teaching and coaching.” He also called him “America's greatest breaststroke champion, but more than that, a real American and gentleman whose conduct is a worthy example for others to follow.” He died at his home in Rancho Palos Verdes, California, on November 22, 2019, at the age of 93.

== Records ==
Concurrent Breaststroke Records held in 1952
Date	Distance	Pool	Time	Location	Record/Prior Recordholder(Time)|
20 June 1952	200 yd (180 m)	20 yard	2:15.8	Iowa City, Iowa	American / Robert Brawner (2:16.6)
23 February 1952	200 yd (180 m)	long pool	2:19.7	Iowa City, Iowa	World / Keith Carter (2:24)
20 June 1952	200 m (660 ft)	20 yard	2:30.5	Iowa City, Iowa	American / Dave Seibold (2:38.5)
1 August 1952	200 m (660 ft)	50 meter	2:34.7	Helsinki, Finland	American / John Davies (2:35.8)
20 June 1952	220 yd (200 m)	20 yard	2:30.5	Iowa City, Iowa	American / Dave Seibold (2:38.5)
27 August 1952	220 yd (200 m)	55 yard	2:34.7	Newark, New Jersey	American / Jerry Holan (2:38)
20 June 1952	300 yd (270 m)	50 yard	3:39.9	Iowa City, Iowa	American / Keith Carter (3:50)
23 April 1950	400 yd (370 m)	20 yard	5:16.8	Cedar Rapids, Iowa	American / James Werson (5:30.7)
2 May 1950	400 yd (370 m)	25 yard	5:14.0	Iowa City, Iowa	American / John Higgans (5:15.7)
2 May 1950	400 yd (370 m)	long pool	5:13.8	Iowa City, Iowa	American /
23 April 1950	400 m (440 yd)	20 yard	5:33.8	Cedar Rapids, Iowa	American
11 June 1952	400 m (1,300 ft)	25 yard	5:13.5	Iowa City, Iowa	American / John Higgans (5:44.8)
29 February 1952	400 m (440 yd)	long pool	5:41.1	Iowa City, Iowa	American / Emmet Cashing (6:06.2)
23 April 1950	440 yd (400 m)	20 yard	5:46.8	Cedar Rapids, Iowa	American / James Werson (5:58.5)
26 April 1950	440 yd (400 m)	25 yard	5:15.7	Iowa City, Iowa	American / John Higgans (5:46.4)
11 June 1952	440 yd (400 m)	long pool	5:33.8	Iowa City, Iowa	American / Emmet Cashing (6:06.2)
4 June 1950	500 yd (460 m)	25 yard	6:40.4	Iowa City, Iowa	American / John Higgans (6:41.4)
9 June 1952	500 yd (460 m)	long pool	6:52.0	Iowa City, Iowa	American / J. Cashian (6:59)
4 June 1950	500 m (1,600 ft)	25 yard	7:16	Iowa City, Iowa	American /John Higgans (7:18.8)
9 June 1952	500 m (1,600 ft)	long pool	7:35.0	Iowa City, Iowa	American /J. Cashian (7:42.2)

== See also ==
- List of Olympic medalists in swimming (men)
- List of University of Iowa people
- Los Angeles High School Notable Alumni
- World record progression 200 metres breaststroke-See notes regarding records prior to 1953

== Notes ==
Stassforth's time of 2:34.7 in the 220 yard breaststroke (long course) at the 1952 AAU Outdoor Nationals correlates to a time of 2:33 in the 200 meter breaststroke (long course). This performance was the fastest all-time for the 220 yard breaststroke (long course) and would have been the fastest 200 meter breaststroke (long course) in history (pre-bifurcation of the breaststroke in 1953) as well if it had been dual timed. This is evidenced by the dual distance timed race in the 1950 National AAU Indoor Championships in the 220 yard breaststroke (short course) between Joe Verdeur and Robert Brawner. During the race, Verdeur broke the world record for 200 meters with a time of 2:28.3 (short course). However, Brawner won the race with a time of 2:29.3 for the full 220 yards beating Verdeur who was second in 2:29.4. On July 10, 1952, Stassforth's coach, David Armbruster, had predicted a time of 2:33 for him in the 200 meter breaststroke (long course): "In my opinion, Bowen is capable of about 2:33 and he certainly should be a strong contender for the Olympic title."
