= Walter Kunz =

Swiss swimmer

Personal information
- Full name: Walter Kunz

Sport
- Sport: Swimming

Walter Kunz is a Swiss former swimmer. He competed in the men's 200 metre breaststroke at the 1948 Summer Olympics.
