= John F. Walter =

American judge (born 1944)

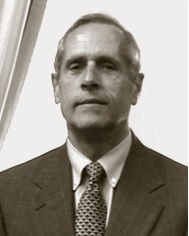
- circa 2002

Judge of the United States District Court for the Central District of California
- Incumbent
- Assumed office May 1, 2002
- Appointed by: George W. Bush
- Preceded by: John Davies

Personal details
- Born: November 3, 1944 (age 81) Buffalo, New York, U.S.
- Party: Republican
- Education: Loyola University of Los Angeles (BA, JD)

John F. Walter (born November 3, 1944) is a United States district judge of the United States District Court for the Central District of California.

== Education and career ==
Walter was born in Buffalo, New York. He received a Bachelor of Arts degree from Loyola University of Los Angeles in 1966 and a Juris Doctor from Loyola University of Los Angeles School of Law in 1969. He was in private practice in California from 1969 to 1970, and again from 1972 to 2002. He was an Assistant United States Attorney for the Central District of California from 1970 to 1972.

=== Federal judicial service ===
On January 23, 2002, Walter was nominated by President George W. Bush to a seat on the United States District Court for the Central District of California vacated by John Davies. Walter was confirmed by the United States Senate on April 25, 2002, and received his commission on May 1, 2002.

== Sources ==
Legal offices
| Preceded by John Davies | Judge of the United States District Court for the Central District of California; 2002–present | Incumbent |
