= Prafulla Mullick =

Indian swimmer

Personal information
- Born: 1919 Calcutta, Bengal Presidency, British India
- Died: 1974 (aged 54–55) Kolkata, West Bengal, India

Sport
- Sport: Swimming

Prafulla Mullick (1919–1974) was an Indian swimmer. He competed in the men's 200 metre breaststroke at the 1948 Summer Olympics.
