= Bob Bonte =

Dutch swimmer (1929–1988)

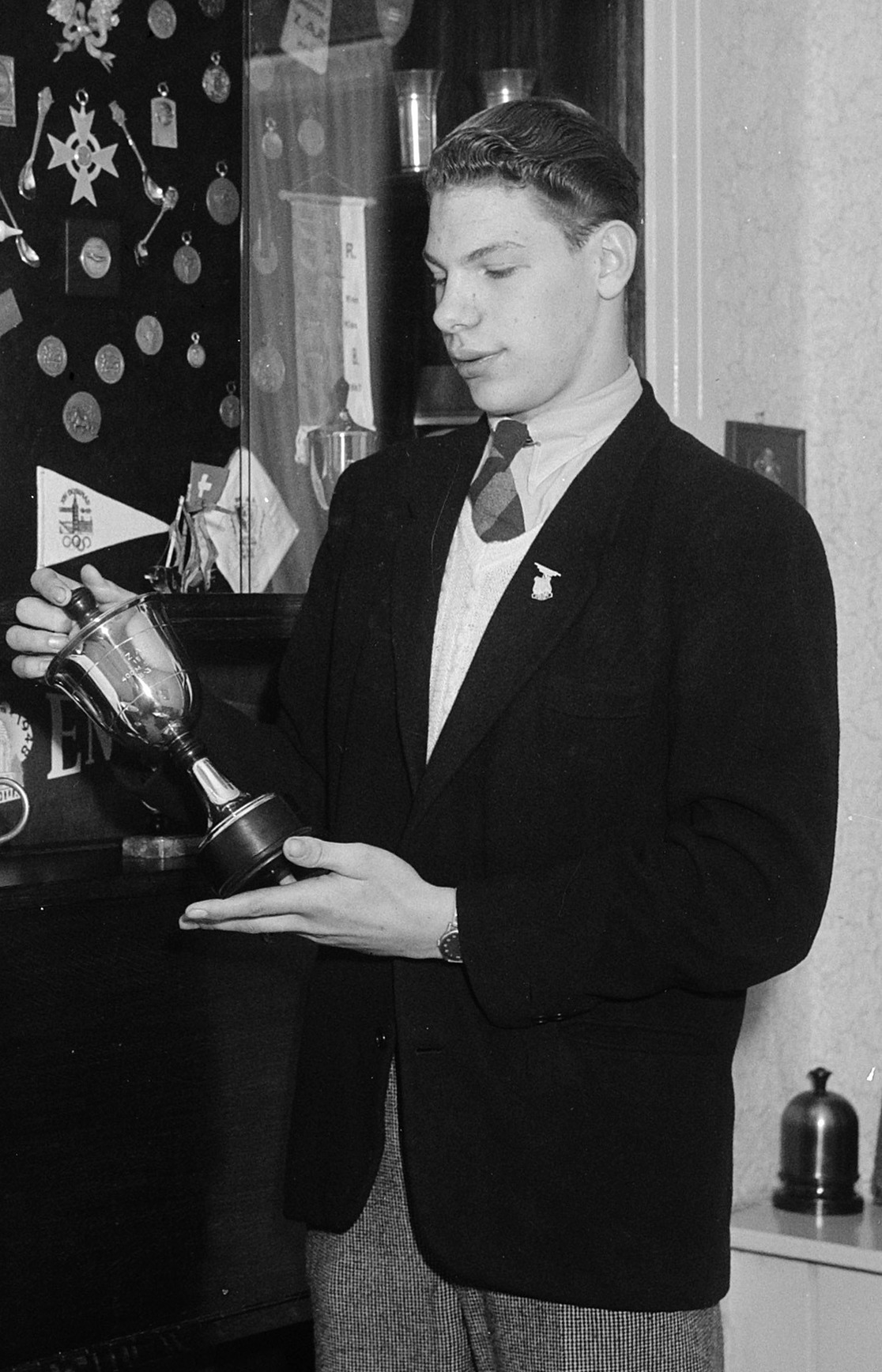
- Bonte at home in 1948

Personal information
- Born: 1 August 1929 Amsterdam, the Netherlands
- Died: 3 September 1988 (aged 59) Amstelveen, the Netherlands

Sport
- Sport: Swimming

Bob Herbert Bonte (1 August 1929 – 3 September 1988) was a Dutch breaststroke swimmer. He competed at the 1948 Olympics in the 200 m event and finished in eighth place. Later that year he set world records in the 400 m and 500 m distances, which became obsolete a few months later. Between 1947 and 1951 Bonte set four national records and won three national titles in the 200 m breaststroke. Bonte was a hairdresser, and ran his own hair salon.
