= Nobuyasu Hirayama =

Japanese swimmer

Personal information
- Born: 9 October 1933 (age 92)

Sport
- Sport: Swimming

Nobuyasu Hirayama (平山 綽保, Hirayama Nobuyasu; born 9 October 1933) is a Japanese former swimmer. He competed in the men's 200 metre breaststroke at the 1952 Summer Olympics.
