= Awad Moukhtar Halloudah =

Egyptian swimmer

Personal information
- Born: 20 February 1931 Cairo, Egypt
- Died: 6 January 2017 (aged 85) Cairo, Egypt

Sport
- Sport: Swimming

Awad Moukhtar Halloudah (20 February 1931 – 6 January 2017) was an Egyptian swimmer. He competed in the men's 200 metre breaststroke at the 1952 Summer Olympics.
