= Carlos Espejo =

Argentine swimmer

Personal information
- Full name: Carlos Felipe Espejo Pérez
- Nationality: Argentina
- Born: 23 August 1923 Córdoba, Argentina
- Died: 10 August 2014 (aged 90)

Sport
- Sport: Swimming
- Strokes: Breaststroke

Carlos Felipe Espejo Pérez (23 August 1923 – 10 August 2014) was an Argentine swimmer who competed at the 1948 Summer Olympics in the 200 m breaststroke.
