= Alfons Oehy =

Swiss swimmer

Personal information
- Nationality: Swiss
- Born: 2 July 1926
- Died: 19 February 1977 (aged 50)

Sport
- Sport: Swimming

Alfons Oehy (2 July 1926 – 19 February 1977) was a Swiss swimmer. He competed in the men's 200 metre breaststroke at the 1952 Summer Olympics.
