= Ludovicus Schoenmaekers =

Belgian swimmer

Personal information
- Born: 15 September 1931 (age 94) Turnhout, Belgium

Sport
- Sport: Swimming

Ludovicus Schoenmaekers (born 15 September 1931) is a Belgian former swimmer. He competed in the men's 200 metre breaststroke at the 1952 Summer Olympics.
