= Nikola Trojanović =

Yugoslav swimmer (1928–2019)

Personal information
- Born: 29 September 1928 Dubrovnik, Yugoslavia
- Died: 28 August 2019 (aged 90)

Sport
- Sport: Swimming

Nikola Trojanović (29 September 1928 – 28 August 2019) was a Yugoslav swimmer. He competed in the men's 200 metre breaststroke at the 1952 Summer Olympics.
