= Kevin Hallett =

Australian swimmer (1929–2021)

Personal information
- Nationality: Australian
- Born: 13 October 1929 Singleton, New South Wales, Australia
- Died: 11 October 2021 (aged 91) Scone, New South Wales, Australia

Sport
- Sport: Swimming

Kevin Hallett (13 October 1929 – 11 October 2021) was an Australian swimmer. He competed in the men's 200 metre breaststroke at the 1948 Summer Olympics.
