= Aulis Kähkönen =

Finnish swimmer

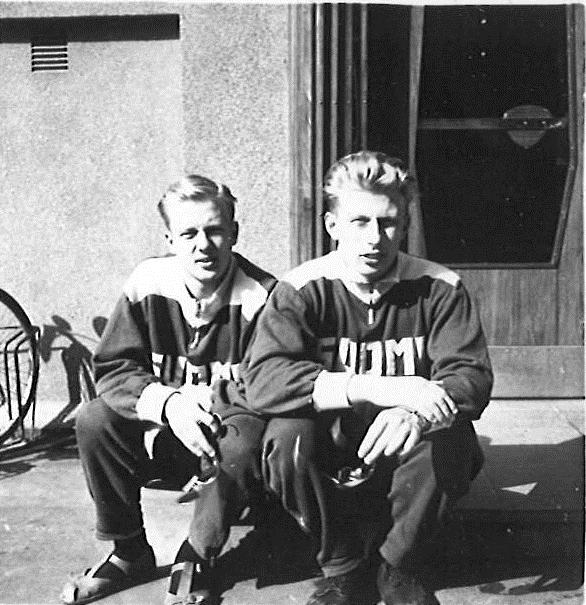
- Kähkönen (right) and Finnish swimmer Kai Hagelberg in 1954

Personal information
- Born: 10 December 1930 Vyborg, Finland
- Died: 20 June 2016 (aged 85) Lake Worth, Florida, United States

Sport
- Sport: Swimming

Aulis Kähkönen (10 December 1930 – 20 June 2016) was a Finnish swimmer. He competed in the men's 200 metre breaststroke at the 1952 Summer Olympics.

== Personal life ==
Kähkönen was of Dutch descent through his father Erkki Kähkönen.

In 1985, Kähkönen moved with his family to Tacoma, Washington, United States, where he worked as a carpenter. He died in Lake Worth, Florida.
