= César Benetti =

Argentine swimmer

Personal information
- Full name: César Benetti Aprosio
- Nationality: Argentina
- Born: March 7, 1924
- Died: June 16, 2014 (aged 90)

Sport
- Sport: Swimming
- Strokes: Breaststroke

César Benetti (March 7, 1924 – June 16, 2014) was an Argentine swimmer who competed at the 1948 Summer Olympics in the 200 m breaststroke.
