= Hans Widmer (swimmer) =

Swiss swimmer (1929–2022)

Personal information
- Full name: Hans Widmer
- Nationality: Swiss
- Born: 1929
- Died: 2002 (aged 72–73)

Sport
- Sport: Swimming

Hans Widmer (1929–2002) was a Swiss breaststroke swimmer. He competed in the men's 200 metre breaststroke at the 1948 Summer Olympics.
