= Daan Buijze =

Dutch swimmer (1928–2018)

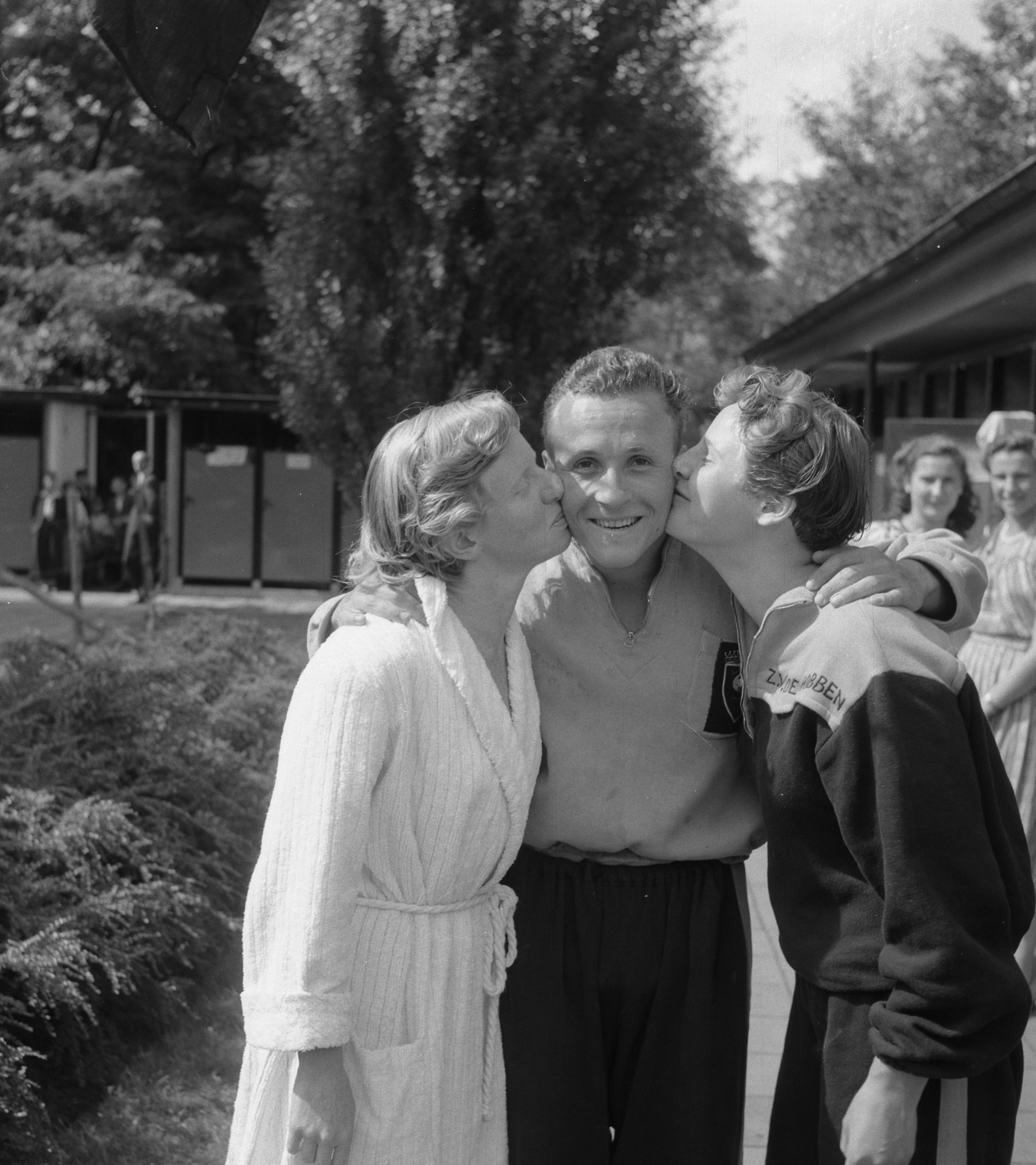

Personal information
- Full name: Daniël Buijze
- Born: 22 October 1928 Delft, Netherlands
- Died: 25 January 2018 (aged 89) De Bilt, Netherlands

Sport
- Sport: Swimming

Daniël Buijze (22 October 1928 – 25 January 2018) was a Dutch swimmer. He competed in the men's 200 metre breaststroke at the 1952 Summer Olympics. Buijze died in De Bilt on 25 January 2018, at the age of 89.
