= Des Cohen =

South African swimmer (1927–2012)

Personal information
- Full name: Desmond Vernon Cohen
- Born: 8 August 1927
- Died: 24 February 2012 (aged 84)

Sport
- Sport: Swimming

Desmond Vernon Cohen (8 August 1927 – 24 February 2012) was a South African swimmer. He competed in the men's 200 metre breaststroke at the 1948 Summer Olympics and the water polo tournament at the 1952 Summer Olympics.
