= Vlastimil Linhart =

Czech swimmer

Personal information
- Born: 13 November 1927

Sport
- Sport: Swimming

Vlastimil Linhart (born 13 November 1927) is a Czech former swimmer. He competed in the men's 200 metre breaststroke at the 1952 Summer Olympics.
