= Mikael Örn =

Swedish swimmer

Personal information
- Full name: Mikael Gustaf Örn
- Nationality: Swedish
- Born: 29 November 1961 (age 64) Gothenburg, Västra Götaland
- Height: 1.95 m (6 ft 5 in)

Sport
- Sport: Swimming
- Strokes: Freestyle
- Club: Kristianstads SLS
- College team: Arizona State University
- Coach: Ron Johnson
Medal record
Men's swimming
Representing Sweden
Olympic Games
Bronze medal – third place	1984 Los Angeles	4x100 m freestyle

Mikael Gustaf Örn (born 29 November 1961) is a Swedish freestyle and medley swimmer who competed for Arizona State University, and represented Sweden at the 1984 Summer Olympics, in Los Angeles, winning a bronze medal in the 4x100-meter freestyle relay.

== Arizona State ==
Orn attended and swam for Arizona State University under Hall of Fame Coach Ron Johnson, graduating in 1984 with a degree in Computer Engineering. At Arizona State, he was the 1984 Athlete of the Year, and was an NCAA Champion at 200-yards in 1983. A noteworthy student, he graduated with a 3.43 grade point average, and was an academic All American in two years. After graduating Arizona State, he was the recipient of an NCAA post-graduate scholarship.

== 1984 Olympic bronze ==
A native of the southwestern coastal city of Gothenburg, the nation's second-largest and the capital of Västra Götaland County, Mikael Örn, who is 195 cm tall [6 ft. 5 in.], competed in the medal-winning 4 × 100 m freestyle relay along with teammates Thomas Lejdström, Bengt Baron and Per Johansson. His best individual result at the 1984 Olympics was 16th place in men's 200 m individual medley.

== Clubs ==
- Kristianstads SLS
