= Jiří Linhart =

Czech swimmer (1924–2011)

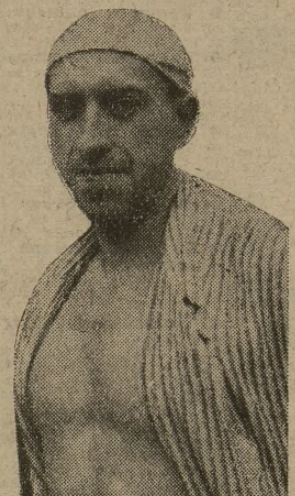

Personal information
- Full name: George Jiří Linhart
- Born: 13 April 1924 Prague, Czechia
- Died: 6 January 2011 (aged 86) Frascati, Italy

Sport
- Sport: Swimming

Jiří Linhart (13 April 1924 – 6 January 2011) was a nuclear fusion physicist and Czech Olympic swimmer. He competed in the men's 200 metre breaststroke at the 1948 Summer Olympics in London. He stayed on in London after which he took his PhD under the supervision of Denis Gabor. He was a pioneer of Nuclear Fusion, author of "Plasma Physics" (1960) - the first textbook on Plasma science, and many academic papers and early patents on nuclear reactors.

In 1956 he became group Head of Acceleration at CERN, and in 1960 he became the head of the EURATOM group in Frascati.

He was also a very keen chess player, playing in the Haifa Olympiad in 1976.
