= Ron Johnson (swim coach) =

American swimming coach ( )

Ronald Lee Johnson
- Johnson in late career

Biographical details
- Born: August 6, 1931; Hollywood, California, U.S.
- Died: August 7, 2009 (aged 78); Scottsdale, Arizona, U.S.
- Education: University of Iowa

Playing career
- 1949–1953: University of Iowa; Coach David Armbruster; Asst. Coach James Counsilman
- Positions: Breaststroke, Butterfly; Individual Medley

Coaching career (HC unless noted)
- 1967–1974: Mexican National Team
- 1976–1993: Arizona State University
- 1992–2002: Sun Devils Masters

Head coaching record
- Overall: 82–44 (ASU 1975–90)

Accomplishments and honors

Championships
- 1977–78 AIAW Championship (ASU Women)

Awards
- United States Masters Coach of the Year 1999; International Swimming Hall of Fame 2007; ASU Sun Devils Athletic Hall of Fame 2007; Masters Swimming Hall of Fame 2007; Coach of the Year 1978-9 (ASU Women)

Ronald Lee Johnson (August 6, 1931 – August 7, 2009) was an American competitive swimmer for the University of Iowa, and a swimming coach best known for coaching Arizona State University from 1976 to 1993. He was Head Coach of the Mexican National Team in the 1968 Mexico City and 1972 Munich Olympics.

Johnson was born August 6, 1931, in Hollywood, California to Roy and Alys Johnson. He attended and swam for St. Louis's Beaumont High School, where in December, 1948, he won the 100-yard backstroke, and the individual medley leading his team to win all nine events at the season's opening dual meet with Hadley High School. He was unbeaten in three years of High School competition, and earned seven American Athletic Union titles, while receiving All American team honors as a High School swimmer. During his High School years, he worked as a lifeguard at St. Louis's Fair Grounds Park, and on occasion gave swimming demonstrations and red cross swim training. Participating in marathon swimming events as well as meets, in July, 1949, he competed a 22-mile swim in the Mississippi River from Alton Dam to Eads Bridge in 5 Hours and 20 minutes. A powerful high school swimming program, Beaumont won the Missouri State Championship in both 1946 and 1949.

== University of Iowa ==
Johnson attended the University of Iowa from 1949 to 1953 where he swam for Hall of Fame Head Coach David Armbruster and Assistant Coach James "Doc" Counsilman. While swimming for Iowa in December, 1952, Johnson attempted to break the 100-yard breaststroke record using the new legal dolphin kick and swam a 58.6, finishing significantly under the former 1951 record of 1:00.5 by Yale's Stanton Smith. Around 1934, Iowa's Coach Armbruster was the first coach to experiment with the dolphin kick as part of the breaststroke, and added an over the water recovery for arms as part of the front pull.

From 1953 to 1956, Johnson served with the United States Navy.

In 1954, in October, he set the inaugural world record in the 100-yard butterfly with a time of 58 seconds. He swam on the U.S. Pan American Games team in 1955.

== Coaching ==
=== International coaching ===
He was Mexico's national team coach from 1967 to 1974, and coached the Mexican Olympic team at the 1968 Mexico City and 1972 Munich Olympics. At the 1992 Olympic games, he coached the Brazilian National team.

== Arizona State University ==
From 1976 to 1993 Johnson coached Arizona State University. His teams finished in the top-10 in six years, and in 1982 had one of their top finishes in sixth place. He had 24 finalists in Olympic competition, who captured a total of 14 Olympic medals. In his first 11 years with Arizona State, he led 20 of his swimmers to Western Athletic Conference and PAC-10 Conference championships in individual and team competition. In addition to his responsibilities as Men's Head Coach, he served as a coach with Mona Plummer for the women's team, leading the women to an Association for Intercollegiate Athletics for Women (AIAW) National Championship in both 1977 and 1978. From 1975 to 1990, Johnson's ASU swim team achieved a record of 82–44 in competition.

Swimmers coached by Johnson include 1980 and 1984 British bronze medal Olympian Andrew Astbury, Brazilian 1988 and 1992 Olympian Cristiano Michelena, marathon Hall of Fame swimmer Paul Asmuth, and 1984 ASU graduate and Swedish bronze medalist Mikael Orn. Johnson coached four-time ASU All American Brad Hering, who would later coach swimming at Arizona Christian University. English swimmer Andrew Jameson, another of Johnson's swimmers, was a 100 butterfly bronze medalist at the Olympics in 1988.

Johnson founded the Mesa Aquatics Club and the Sun Devils Masters Club in Tempe, which produced over seventy national master's champions. Beginning to compete in the United States Masters swimming program in 1973, Johnson held world records in each of the four competitive strokes.

He and his wife Pricilla had four children.

=== Publications ===
Johnson was the author of the book, Romancing the Water, and published articles in SWIM, Swimming World, and Swimming Technique Magazines.

At 71, Johnson retired from active coaching in 2002, leaving the Sun Devils Masters Club in Tempe, Arizona.

=== Honors ===
In 1999, Johnson was voted a United States Masters Coach of the Year, and became a member of the International Swimming Hall of Fame in 2007. He was admitted to the Arizona State University Sun Devils Athletic Hall of Fame in 2007, and with his world age group records, was admitted to the Masters Swimming Hall of Fame in the same year. In 2001, he was named as the Masters Swimmer of the Year. In 1978-9, he was named coach of the year with Mona Plummer by the National Women's Swimming Association. Johnson was the Coach of the Year for the Pac-10 in 1983.

Having survived several heart attacks during his career, he died Friday night, August 7, 2009, in Scottsdale, Arizona. On Saturday, August 15, a morning memorial service was held at the ASU Memorial Union's Ventana Room.
