= Blago Barbieri =

Yugoslav swimmer (1923–1987)

Personal information
- Born: 1 July 1923
- Died: 12 August 1987 (aged 64)

Sport
- Sport: Swimming

Blago Barbieri (1 July 1923 – 12 August 1987) was a Yugoslav swimmer. He competed in the men's 200 metre breaststroke at the 1952 Summer Olympics.
