= Vladimir Borisenko (swimmer) =

Soviet swimmer

Personal information
- Born: 1928
- Died: 1987 (aged 58–59)

Sport
- Sport: Swimming

Vladimir Borisenko (1928 – 1987) was a Soviet swimmer. He competed in the men's 200 metre breaststroke at the 1952 Summer Olympics.
