= David Armbruster (swim coach) =

American swimming coach

David A. Armbruster

Biographical details
- Born: August 18, 1890; Spencerville, Ohio
- Died: August 5, 1985 (aged 94); Aurora, Colorado
- Education: Iowa Wesleyan College; University of Iowa BA, MA

Coaching career (HC unless noted)
- 1917-1958: University of Iowa

Accomplishments and honors

Championships
- Big 10 Championship 1936 (University of Iowa)

Awards
- Helms Hall of Fame 1956; International Swimming Hall of Fame 1966; U. of Iowa Athletic Hall of Fame 1989

David Alvin Armbruster Sr. (August 18, 1890 – August 5, 1985) was an American swim coach who served as the first coach for the University of Iowa swim team from 1917-1958. In his long coaching career, he trained two swimmers who medaled in the Olympics, had fourteen of his swimmers capture NCAA titles, and led 75 of his swimmers to receive All American honors as collegians. He may be best known for helping to develop the "over the head" arm movement used in the modern butterfly, which he helped initially develop as a refinement to the breaststroke. Around 1934, Armbruster combined the over the head breaststroke recovery with the dolphin kick which later become the modern butterfly stroke. The butterfly stroke was not adopted as an official stroke separate from the breaststroke in swimming competitions until 1956. He is also known as one of several collegiate coaches who helped in the development and popularization of the flip turn, now used universally in training and competition.

Armbruster was born into a large family on August 18, 1890 in Spencerville, Ohio to German immigrants Franz F. and Augusta Armbruster. He studied three years at Iowa Wesleyan College in Mount Pleasant, and then completed his education at the University of Iowa in Iowa City where he received his Bachelors and Masters degrees.

In 1914, in preparation for career as a coach, he worked as the Physical Director for a local YMCA in Mount Pleasant, Iowa, and had worked earlier with local YMCAs. In 1916 he taught swimming and supervised canoeing on a Lake at a YMCA summer camp in Spirit Lake, Iowa.

In April, 1918, though he had already begun his coaching career at the University of Iowa, he served during the WWI era, and received training in aero mechanics, and engines at New York University.

== Coaching U. of Iowa ==
He served as an Associate physical education professor for the University of Iowa Hawkeyes in Iowa City and as their first Men's swimming and diving coach from 1916-1958, also teaching canoeing in his early years. Early in his coaching career, he married Edna M. Collins in Mount Pleasant, Iowa on December 25, 1917. His wife Edna was a graduate of Iowa Wesleyan where they likely met. Highly active in the swimming community, he served as the American College Swimming Association President in 1938. Promoting swimming at Iowa, he helped acquire a new Olympic pool at the University in 1927, which became only the second pool in the country of 50 meters. His Hawkeye swimming teams finished in the top ten in NCAA national team competition in eighteen years.

In 1934, Armbruster developed an over the head motion for the breaststroke recovery to improve stroke efficiency and reduce the drag caused by an underwater recovery. He taught the movement to his University of Iowa swimmers and popularized the motion as a more effective way to swim breaststroke. Working with swimmer Jack Sieg, he added the dolphin kick to the overhead arm entry, and helped create and popularize what became the modern butterfly stroke. In 2003, the older whip style kick originally used with breaststroke was outlawed for the newer butterfly stroke, which was almost universally using the dolphin kick by that year. University coaches and swimming officials resisted the full introduction of the butterfly into competition, and the new stroke did not become an official competition stroke in the U.S. and internationally until 1956. Armbruster also worked to improve the flip turn, and helped develop underwater windows for competition pools that could be used to observe and study the stroke technique of swimmers. The American International Swimming Hall of Fame cited Arbruster as one of the primary developers of the butterfly stroke.

=== Outstanding U. Iowa swimmers ===
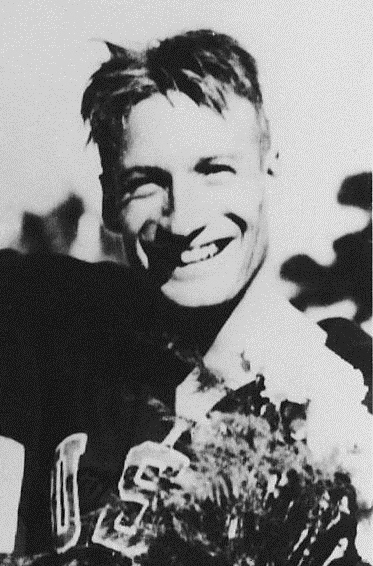
B. Stassforth

Outstanding swimmers Ellis coached at Iowa included medalists Bowen Stassforth and Wally Ris who captured gold and silver medals in the 1948 and 1952 Olympics. Stassforth swam for Iowa in 1949, 1950, and 1952, and won his medal in the 1952 Helsinki Olympics in the 200 meter breaststroke using the over the water hand entry. Wally Ris swam for Iowa in the 1940's and in the 1948 Olympics won a gold medal in the Men's 100 meter freestyle event with a time of 57.3, winning by only half a second over American Alan Ford. Ris also won a gold in the 4x200 meter freestyle relay with a combined team time of 8:46.0, with the favored American team beating the equally favored silver medal Hungarian team by only 2.4 seconds. A Hall of Fame recipient, Ris was considered Armbruster's top swimmer, and captured five consecutive championships in AAU competition in the mid to late 1940's.

Armbruster mentored several high achieving coaches. Hall of Fame and Olympic Coach James "Doc" Counsilman of Indiana University pursued physiology doctoral studies from Iowa under Armbruster, and served as Armbruster's assistant swim coach at the University from 1948-1951. Counsilman assistant coached at Iowa under Armbruster during the swimming tenure of Olympians Wally Ris and Bowen Stassforth and learned a great deal from Armbruster's coaching methods and likely his knowledge of the breast and butterfly strokes. Hall of Fame and Mexico Olympic Team coach Ron Johnson swam for Armbruster at the University of Iowa, and had a long career coaching swimming at Arizona State University from 1976-1993. Johnson led fourteen of his swimmers to earn Olympic medals. Armbruster coached Dr. John Boggert, who was an American Athletic Union Women's Swimming Chairperson. Earl Ellis was coached by Armbruster while Ellis swam for Iowa from 1954-1956. Ellis was an All American recipient as a two year swimmer at Iowa, and later served as a Hall of Fame Coach for the University of Washington from 1969-1998.

Armbruster was the author of the well-received publication Swimming and Diving. The earliest edition was in 1957, and numerous subsequent editions have had collaborative authors including L. F. Morehouse, Robert H. Allen, and Robert Sherwood Billingley.

Around thirteen years after his coaching retirement in 1958, Armbruster moved to Denver, Colorado from Iowa in 1971. He died Monday, August 5, 1985 at Cherry Hills Nursing Home in Aurora, Colorado, after suffering a long illness. He was predeceased by his wife Edna in 1980, and was survived by two sons and two daughters. He was buried at Memory Gardens Cemetery in Iowa City, Iowa, close to the University of Iowa Campus.

=== Honors ===
He was a 1956 inductee to the Helms Hall of Fame, and in 1966 became a member of the prestigious International Swimming Hall of Fame. He was admitted to the University of Iowa Athletic Hall of Fame in 1989.
