= Juha Tikka =

Finnish swimmer

Personal information
- Born: 30 December 1929 Helsinki, Finland
- Died: 13 December 2001 (aged 71) Helsinki, Finland

Sport
- Sport: Swimming

Juha Yrjö Julius Tikka (30 December 1929 – 13 December 2001) was a Finnish swimmer. He competed in the men's 200 metre breaststroke at the 1952 Summer Olympics. He also was the commander of the Finnish Navy from 1983 to 1990. His rank was Counter admiral.
