= Yury Kurchashov =

Soviet swimmer (born 1930)

Personal information
- Born: 1930

Sport
- Sport: Swimming

Yury Kurchashov (born 1930) is a Soviet former swimmer. He competed in the men's 200 metre breaststroke at the 1952 Summer Olympics.
