= Ľudovít Komadel =

Slovak swimmer (1927–2022)

Personal information
- Born: 1 November 1927 Piešťany, Czechoslovakia (now Slovakia)
- Died: 1 September 2022 (aged 94)

Sport
- Sport: Swimming

Ľudovít Komadel (1 November 1927 – 1 September 2022) was a Slovak swimmer. He competed in the men's 200 metre breaststroke at the 1952 Summer Olympics. At the 1968 Summer Olympics, he served as a physician for the Czechoslovak Olympic team.
