= Ahmed Kandil =

Egyptian swimmer (1923/1924–1950)

Personal information
- Full name: Ahmed Mohamed Hussain Kandil
- Born: 1923 or 1924 Tanta, Egypt
- Died: 9 May 1950 (aged 26) Port Said, Egypt

Sport
- Sport: Swimming

Ahmed Mohamed Hussain Kandil (Arabic: أحمد محمد حسين قنديل; 1923 or 1924 – 9 May 1950) was an Egyptian swimmer. He competed in the men's 200 metre breaststroke and men's 4 × 200 metre freestyle relay events at the 1948 Summer Olympics held in London, United Kingdom. He was killed in a plane crash on 11 May 1950 while serving with the Egyptian Air Force when his Spitfire collided in mid-air with another Spitfire over Port Said.
