= Takayoshi Kajikawa =

Japanese swimmer

Personal information
- Born: 10 March 1934 (age 92) Hiroshima, Japan

Sport
- Sport: Swimming

Takayoshi Kajikawa (梶川 孝義, Kajikawa Takayoshi; born 10 March 1934) is a Japanese former swimmer. He competed in the men's 200 metre breaststroke at the 1952 Summer Olympics.
