= Jerry Holan =

American swimmer (1931–2022)

Personal information
- Full name: Gerald Ray Holan
- Nickname: "Jerry"
- National team: United States
- Born: May 27, 1931 Westchester, Illinois, U.S.
- Died: July 23, 2022 (aged 91)

Sport
- Sport: Swimming
- Strokes: Breaststroke
- College team: Ohio State University
Medal record
Amateur Athletic Union
Gold medal – first place	1953 Indoor Championships	220 yd breaststroke
Gold medal – first place	1952 Outdoor Championships	110 yd breaststroke
Silver medal – second place	1952 Outdoor Championships	220 yd breaststroke
Bronze medal – third place	1951 Indoor Championships	220 yd Breaststroke
Bronze medal – third place	1951 Outdoor Championships	100 m Breaststroke
NCAA
Gold medal – first place	1953 Championships	200 yd breaststroke
Silver medal – second place	1952 Championships	200 yd breaststroke
Silver medal – second place	1951 Championships	220 yd breaststroke
Gold medal – first place	1953 Championships	3x100 yd Medley Relay
Gold medal – first place	1951 Championships	3x100 yd Medley Relay
Big Ten
Gold medal – first place	1953 Championships	200 yd Breaststroke
Gold medal – first place	1953 Championships	3X100 yd Medley Relay
Bronze medal – third place	1952 Championships	200 yd Breaststroke
Gold medal – first place	1952 Championships	3X100 yd Medley Relay
Gold medal – first place	1951 Championships	3X100 yd Medley Relay

Gerald Ray Holan (May 27, 1931 – July 23, 2022) was an American swimmer who represented the United States at the 1952 Summer Olympics in Helsinki, Finland.

== Biography ==
Holan was 1949 National High School Champion in the 100-yard breaststroke, swimming for Proviso Township High School in Maywood, Illinois, and won the National YMCA 200-yard breaststroke championship that year. He started college at Iowa State but dropped out within two weeks and later attended The Ohio State University. Holan was an All-American for the Buckeyes in 1951, 1952, and 1953, helping them win the Big 10 300 yard medley relay in all three years. In 1953 he won the Big 10 200 yd breaststroke and was NCAA Champion in the 200 yard butterfly, before that stroke used a dolphin kick. He also helped Ohio State win NCAA titles in the medley relay in 1951 and 1953.

He swam in the 1952 United States Olympic swim trials in the 200 meter breaststroke, finishing second behind Bowen Stassforth. At Helsinki, Holan set an Olympic record of 2:36.8 in his initial heat, beating Joe Verdeur's record of 2:39.3. He failed to qualify in the semifinals for the Olympic final, however, by 0.2 seconds. Subsequently, he finished first at the 1952 Outdoor AAU National Championships in the 110 yard breaststroke and second in the 220 yard breaststroke competing with Bowen Stassforth for the top spot in both events. Holan's second place clocking of 2:35 flat at the nationals (a distance 3 feet 9 inches longer than the Olympic final) in the 220 yd breaststroke (long course) would have put him in medal contention earlier in Helsinki.

After graduating from Ohio State with a business degree, Holan began work for Bell Telephone. He left for a tour of duty in the Korean War, as an artillery officer with the United States Army, but returned after the war to work for Bell for his entire business career. Holan was inducted into the Ohio State Hall of Fame.

== Notes ==
Holan's time of 2:35 flat in the 220 yard breaststroke (long course) at the 1952 AAU Outdoor Nationals correlates to a time of 2:34 or faster in the 200 meter breaststroke (long course). This performance was the second fastest (pre bifurcation of the breaststroke in 1953) all-time for the 220 yard breaststroke (long course) and would have been the second fastest 200 meter breaststroke (long course) in history as well if it had been dual timed. This is evidenced by the dual distance timed race in the 1950 National AAU Indoor Championships in the 220 yard breaststroke (short course) between Joe Verdeur and Robert Brawner. During the race, Verdeur broke the world record for 200 meters with a time of 2:28.3 (short course). However, Brawner won the race with a time of 2:29.3 for the full 220 yards beating Verdeur who was second in 2:29.4.

== See also ==
- List of Ohio State University people

Records
Preceded by Joe Verdeur	Men's 200 m breaststroke Olympic record-holder July 28, 1952 – August 1, 1952	Succeeded by John Davies
Records
Preceded by Robert Brawner	Men's 220 yard breaststroke American record-holder (long course); August 27, 1952	Succeeded by Bowen Stassforth
