= Petrus Pavlicek =

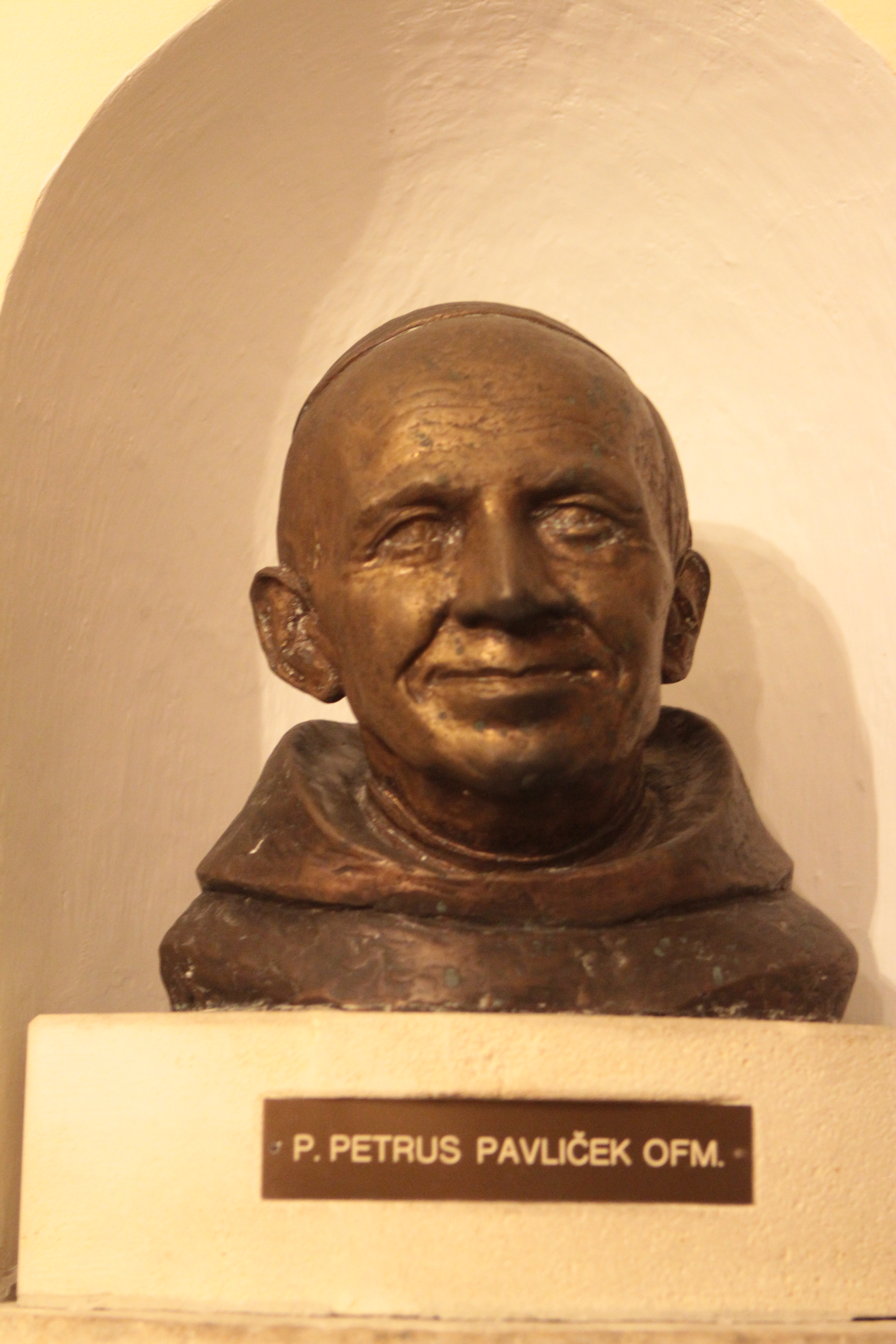
Bust of Petrus Pavlicek in the Franciscan Church, Vienna

Petrus Pavlicek (born Otto Pavlicek; January 6, 1902 – December 14, 1982) was a Franciscan (OFM) and founder of the Crusade of Reparation of the Holy Rosary for Peace in the World.

== Life ==
Pavlicek was born on January 6, 1902 in Innsbruck. He was born on the second son of the imperial and royal officer Augustin Pavlicek and Gabriele Alscher and baptized with the name Otto. His mother died when he was two years old. Then, his father and sons moved to Vienna, in 1915 to Olomouc. There, in 1920, Pavlicek passed the admittance exam to a higher education institution and then worked for the furniture factory Thonet.

He left the church in 1921, was from 1922 to 1924 in the military and worked after that in Prague for the company Brown, Boveri & Cie. Since there the work was not to his satisfaction, he studied from 1927 to 1930 in the academy of fine arts in Wrocław, lived after that as artist in Paris and London, where he, on December 10, 1932, got wed in a civil ceremony to the artist Kathleen Nell Brockhouse. The marriage lasted only a few months. Pavlicek moved to Cambridge, lived during 1933 in Brno and then in Prague.

After recovering from a severe illness, he joined again the Catholic Church on December 15, 1935, and he wanted to become a priest. In 1936, he visited Therese Neumann that strengthened him in his plan. He was neither in Innsbruck nor in Vienna accepted by the Franciscans because he was already 35 years old. Later, he joined in Prague und received the religious name Petrus. On August 29, 1938, he made his simple religious vows, three years later the solemn. On December 14, 1941, he was ordained a priest.

On May 13, 1942, he was arrested by the Gestapo for supposed military-forces draft evasion and was brought to a court martial. The process ended with an acquittal. On October 7, he had to march into the west front as a paramedic and became a prisoner of war in American captivity on August 15, 1944. He was taken to Cherbourg-Octeville, where he acted as a prisoner of war camp priest and learnt, for the first time, through a brochure, about the Marian apparitions in Fátima: Our Lady of Fátima.

On July 16, 1945, he was released from captivity, could not return to the monastery in Prague and went to Vienna. There he was appointed as missionary. On February 2, 1946, he went on pilgrimage to Mariazell in gratitude for the fortunate return home from World War II. Here, he heard an interior voice, which said: "Do, as I say, and there will be peace." These words reminded him of the message of Fatima and he founded, in February 1947, the Crusade of Reparation of the Holy Rosary for Peace in the World (RSK).

Since September 1948, every month in the Franciscan Church, Vienna, took place ceremonies for peace. From 1949, he published a periodical, which is named "Betendes Gottesvolk" today. From 1950 to 1955, in every September, he organized the yearly procession of the Name of Mary in the Vienna Ring Road.

He considered the signing of the Austrian State Treaty, in May 1955, as an achievement of his prayer movement. Father Petrus led the "Crusade of Reparation of the Holy Rosary" until his death. He died on December 14, 1982 in Vienna. He was buried in the Franciscan Church. His canonization process was started on October 13, 2000.

== Works ==
- Das Sühne-Opfer Jesu und Mariä für die Sünder der Welt. Rosenkranz-Sühnekreuzzug um den Frieden der Welt, Vienna 1961
- Regular articles in the magazine: Betendes Gottesvolk
