= John Davies (swimmer) =

Australian-American swimmer and judge (1929–2020)

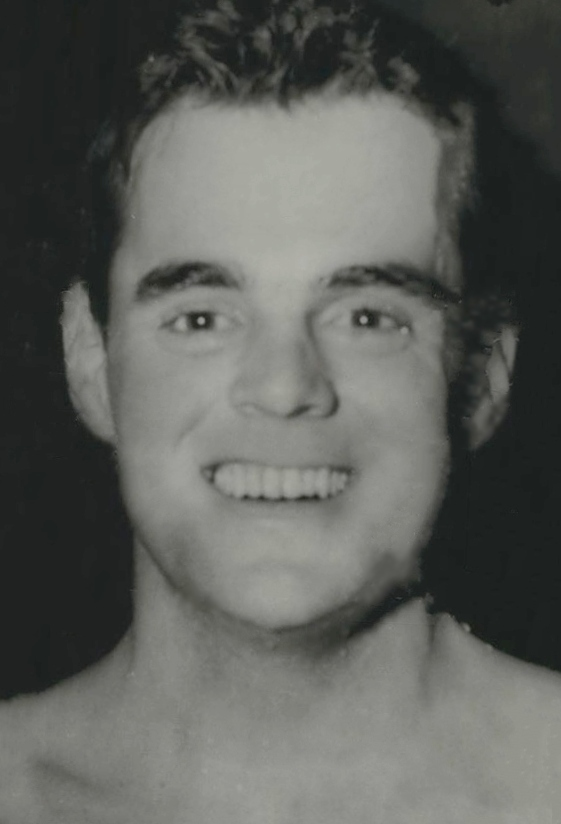
- Davies in 1951

Judge of the United States District Court for the Central District of California
- In office 9 June 1986 – 18 July 1998
- Appointed by: Ronald Reagan
- Preceded by: Cynthia Holcomb Hall
- Succeeded by: John F. Walter

Personal details
- Born: John Griffith Davies; 17 May 1929 Willoughby, New South Wales, Australia
- Died: 24 March 2020 (aged 90) Pasadena, California, US
- Citizenship: Australia; United States
- Spouse: Margery M. Follinger (m. 1952)
- Children: 2
- Education: University of Michigan (B.A.); University of California, Los Angeles (LL.B.)
- Occupation: Swimmer; lawyer; judge; Sports career
- National team: Australia
- Height: 6 ft 4 in (1.93 m)
- Weight: 193 lb (88 kg)
- Sport: Swimming
- Strokes: Breaststroke
- College team: University of Michigan
Medal record
Representing Australia
Olympic Games
Gold medal – first place	1952 Helsinki	200 m breaststroke
Amateur Athletic Union
Gold medal – first place	1952 Indoor Championships	220 yd breaststroke
Gold medal – first place	1951 Outdoor Championships	200 m breaststroke
Gold medal – first place	1951 Outdoor Championships	100 m breaststroke
Gold medal – first place	1951 Outdoor Championships	300 m Medley Relay
Gold medal – first place	1951 Indoor Championships	220 yd breaststroke
Silver medal – second place	1951 Indoor Championships	100 yd breaststroke
Silver medal – second place	1948 Outdoor Championships	200 m breaststroke
NCAA
Silver medal – second place	1948 Championships	200 yd breaststroke
Gold medal – first place	1952 Championships	200 yd breaststroke
Gold medal – first place	1952 Championships	100 yd breaststroke
Big Ten
Gold medal – first place	1952 Championships	200 yd breaststroke
Gold medal – first place	1951 Championships	200 yd breaststroke
Gold medal – first place	1952 Championships	100 yd breaststroke

John Griffith Davies (17 May 1929 – 24 March 2020) was an Australian-American swimmer and United States federal judge. As a breaststroke swimmer of the 1940s and 1950s, he won a gold medal in the 200-metre breaststroke at the 1952 Summer Olympics in Helsinki, set a world record in the 200 yard breaststroke (short course) and tied the world record in the 200 m breaststroke (long course). After retiring from competition swimming, he became a lawyer in California and, after becoming a naturalized American, was appointed a United States district judge of the United States District Court for the Central District of California by President Ronald Reagan in 1986, and presided over the federal trial of the Los Angeles Police Department officers charged with assaulting Rodney King.

== Swimming career ==
Davies entered and won both breaststroke events at the 1946 New South Wales Championships held at Manly. He began to train under Forbes Carlile in 1947 and won the 220yd breaststroke at the Australian Championships, as well as helping New South Wales to win the 3x110yd medley relay. He repeated these victories at the 1948 Australian Championships, earning selection to the 1948 Summer Olympics in London at the age of 19. In the lead up to the Games, he won two races in London. Davies came in second in his heat and fourth in his semifinal with an Australian record 2m 44.8s to qualify for the final of the 200m breaststroke. Davies set a new Australian record in the final, finishing 4th and recording a time of 2m 43.7s. His time was faster than the bronze medallist's but the judges ranked him as 4th.

After the Games, Davies enrolled at the University of Michigan in Ann Arbor, Michigan, where he trained under the guidance of Hall of Fame coach Matt Mann and became a two time All American. Without scholarship support being available for swimmers during that era, he pursued a political science degree, while supporting himself by washing dishes and working at the International Student Centre. Mann also altered Davies's style, changing from the even-paced racing of Carlile to an early-attack oriented style of swimming. Davies managed a second placing at the 200yd breaststroke at the NCAA Championships in 1948 but failed to place in 1949 and 1950. In 1951 he won the 200m breaststroke at the AAU National Outdoor Championships and in 1952 won the 200yd breaststroke short course at the NCAA Championships setting a new world record of 2:21.9 and the 200m Breaststroke AAU National Indoor Championship. The Australian Olympic Federation granted him an exemption from the Australian Championships and selected him for the 1952 Summer Olympics in Helsinki. He trained with fellow team member John Marshall at Yale University under coach Robert Kiphuth while the rest of the Australian team trained in Townsville.

Davies arrived in Helsinki as the favourite after setting the 200-yard breaststroke (short course) world record earlier in the year, but after a poor time trial a week before the Games, he was forced to restrict his training to under a kilometre per day and sleep for 20 hours daily. Davies was not the fastest qualifier in the heats but broke the Olympic record set by Jerry Holan in the prelims. Swimming in his even-paced style, Davies trailed by more than 2 seconds at the 100m mark, but overhauled his rivals, pipping the United States' Bowen Stassforth by 0.3s to reset his new Olympic record and tie the existing world record (long course) time of 2m 34.4s set by Herbert Klein of Germany who was third. Davies, Stassforth, and Klein were the only three swimmers to better 2:35 in history in the 200 m breaststroke (long course) prior to the bifurcation of the stroke in 1953.

== Legal career ==
Davies graduated from the UCLA School of Law in 1959. He became a U.S. citizen in 1960. He worked as a lawyer in Los Angeles.

=== Federal judicial service ===
On 22 April 1986, Davies was nominated by U.S. president Ronald Reagan to a seat on the United States District Court for the Central District of California vacated by Cynthia Holcomb Hall. Davies was confirmed by the United States Senate on 6 June 1986, and received his commission on 9 June 1986.

In January 1991, Davies found that the no obscenity clause in National Endowment for the Arts grants violated the Constitution's Free Speech Clause. In April 1996, Davies overturned the state conviction of Charles Keating for his involvement in the savings and loan scandal due to flawed jury instructions. In June 1998, Davies mediated the $400 million settlement which Merrill Lynch agreed to pay for its role in causing the Orange County, California bankruptcy.

In 1993, Davies presided over the federal trial of four Los Angeles Police Department officers for the beating of Rodney King, who were charged with federal civil rights violations and had previously been acquitted in state court. Two officers, Stacey Koon and Laurence Powell, were convicted. The United States Federal Sentencing Guidelines recommend the offenders serve up to ten years in prison. Instead, Davies sentenced the offenders to 30 months. Davies' sentencing was vacated by the United States Court of Appeals for the Ninth Circuit in August 1994 for violating the sentencing guidelines. In February 1996, that judgment was itself reversed by the Supreme Court of the United States, which found that Davies had not abused his discretion. He faced widespread public criticism for the lightness of the sentences he delivered to the former police officers. U.S. Representative Maxine Waters called the sentences a "kiss on the wrist". Joseph Duff of the ACLU called the sentencing "a travesty of Justice".

Davies retired from the bench on 18 July 1998.

== Personal life and death ==
Davies was born in Willoughby, New South Wales, on 17 May 1929. In 1952, he married Margery Willoughby, with whom he had two children.

Davies died from cancer in Pasadena, California, on 24 March 2020, at the age of 90. Retired U.S. District Court Judge Robert C. Bonner said of his former colleague: "He was one of the best federal judges ever to serve, and to my knowledge the only Olympic gold medalist to become a federal judge. In my view, he was the judge who saved L.A. with his superb handling of the federal civil rights trial of the police who beat Rodney King. We have lost a great judge and a good friend. He was also a masterful trial lawyer before his appointment to the bench."

== Honours ==
Davies was inducted into the International Swimming Hall of Fame in 1984, and the Sport Australia Hall of Fame in 1992. He received an Australian Sports Medal in 2000.

== Record notes ==
The world record for the 200-metre breaststroke prior to the bifurcation of the butterfly breaststroke into separate strokes in 1953 could be accomplished in either short or long course pools. FINA recognised only one world record for the 200-metre breaststroke. The 1952 US Olympic Book lists the 200-metre breaststroke world record as belonging to Herbert Klein with a time of 2:27.3 who swam it in a short course pool. If records were measured as they are today in long and short course pools, Davies tied Herbert Klein's long course world record of 2:34.4 for the 200-metre breaststroke set on 13 August 1950, in Göppingen, Germany at their 1952 Olympic final.

== See also ==
- List of members of the International Swimming Hall of Fame
- List of Olympic medalists in swimming (men)
- World record progression 200 metres breaststroke

== Sources ==
- Andrews, Malcolm (2000). Australia at the Olympic Games. Sydney, New South Wales: ABC Books. pp. 124–125. ISBN 0-7333-0884-8.
- Howell, Max (1986). Aussie Gold. Albion, Queensland: Brooks Waterloo. pp. 66–68. ISBN 0-86440-680-0.
- Wallechinsky, David and Jaime Loucky (2008). "Swimming (Men): 200-Meter Breaststroke". In The Complete Book of the Olympics – 2008 Edition. London: Aurum Press, Limited. p. 929.

Records
Preceded by Joe Verdeur	Men's 200-meter breaststroke world record-holder (long course); 1 August 1952 – 1953; With: Herbert Klein	Record keeping discontinued due to 1952 FINA rule forbidding breaststrokers from using butterfly style kick or hand recovery
Preceded by Robert Brawner	Men's 200-yard breaststroke world record-holder (short course); 29 March 1952 – 1953	Record keeping discontinued due to 1952 FINA rule forbidding breaststrokers from using butterfly style kick or hand recovery
Preceded by Jerry Holan	Men's 200 m breaststroke Olympic record-holder 1 August 1952 – 1953	Record keeping discontinued due to 1952 FINA rule forbidding breaststrokers from using butterfly style kick or hand recovery
Preceded by Robert Brawner	Men's 220 y breaststroke American (AAU) record-holder (short course); 4 April 1952 – 1953	Record keeping discontinued due to 1952 FINA rule forbidding breaststrokers from using butterfly style kick or hand recovery
Preceded by Joe Verdeur	Men's 200 m breaststroke American (AAU) record-holder (short course); 4 April 1952 – 1953	Record keeping discontinued due to 1952 FINA rule forbidding breaststrokers from using butterfly style kick or hand recovery
Preceded by Joe Verdeur	Men's 100 m breaststroke American (AAU) record-holder (short course); 4 April 1951 – 1953	Record keeping discontinued due to 1952 FINA rule forbidding breaststrokers from using butterfly style kick or hand recovery
Legal offices
Preceded by Cynthia Holcomb Hall	Judge of the United States District Court for the Central District of California; 1986–1998	Succeeded by John F. Walter
