= Sándor Németh =

Hungarian swimmer (1925–1993)

Personal information
- Born: 8 August 1925 Sümeg, Hungary
- Died: 7 December 1993 (aged 68) Budapest, Hungary

Sport
- Sport: Swimming
- Club: CS Magyar Testgyakorlók Köre
Medal record
Men's swimming
Representing Hungary
European Championships
Bronze medal – third place	1947 Monte Carlo	200 m breaststroke

Sándor Németh (8 August 1925 – 7 December 1993) was a Hungarian swimmer who won a bronze medal in the 200 m breaststroke at the 1947 European Aquatics Championships. He competed in the same event at the 1948 Summer Olympics, but did not reach the finals.
