= Jiro Nagasawa =

Japanese swimmer (1932–2010)

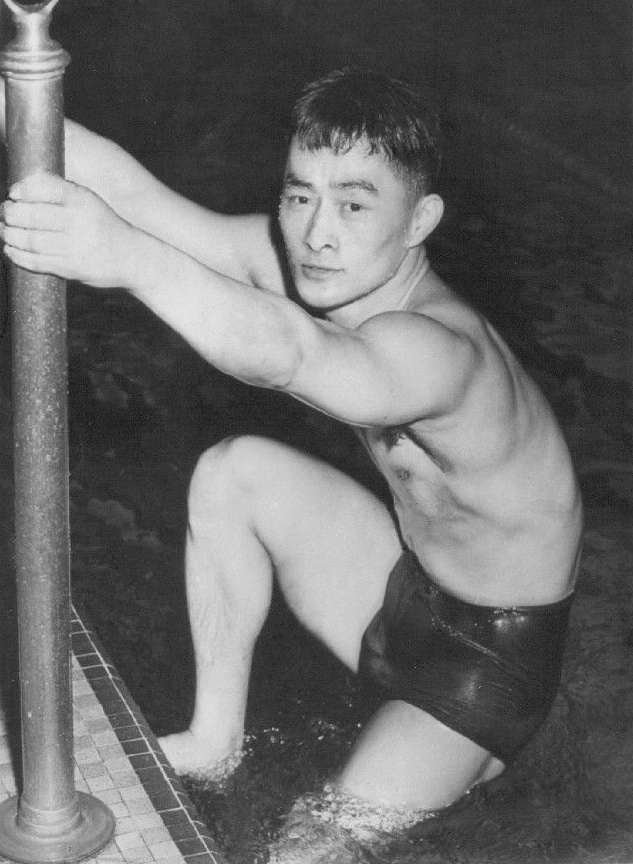
- Nagasawa in 1956

Personal information
- Nationality: Japan
- Born: February 2, 1932 Numazu, Japan
- Died: March 23, 2010 (aged 78)
- Height: 166 cm (5 ft 5 in)
- Weight: 60 kg (132 lb)

Sport
- Sport: Swimming
- Strokes: Butterfly, breaststroke

Jiro Nagasawa (長沢 二郎, Nagasawa Jirō; February 2, 1932 – March 23, 2010) was a Japanese swimmer. He is credited with the invention of the modern butterfly stroke. Although not the first to swim the butterfly-breaststroke, Nagasawa was the first to use a dolphin kick, where the legs stayed together and moved simultaneously up then down.

== Biography ==
Nagasawa started as a backstroke swimmer, aged 11, and after World War II changed first to long-distance freestyle and then to breaststroke. By the 1952 Summer Olympics he suffered from arthritis on both knees, and finished only sixth in the 200 m breaststroke. Because of his knee problems, he changed from the frog kick to the dolphin kick in 1954, and by 1956 set five world records in the 200 m and 220 yd butterfly. In 1956 he won the USA Swimming Prize and in 1954 the Japan Sport Award. He was inducted into the International Swimming Hall of Fame in 1993 and later in life became an Olympic National Coach.

Nagasawa died on March 23, 2010, from throat cancer at the age of 78.

== See also ==
- List of members of the International Swimming Hall of Fame
