= Joe Verdeur =

American swimmer (1926–1991)

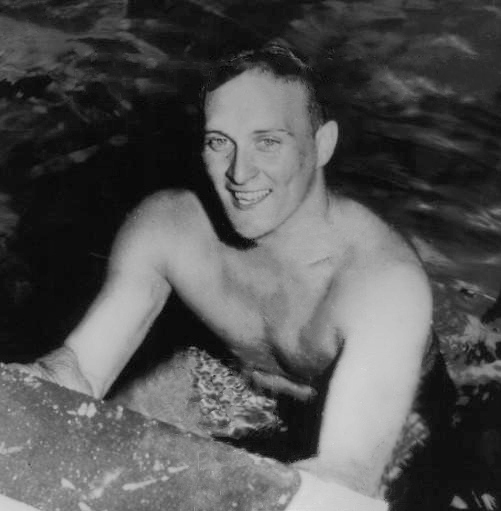
- Verdeur in 1949

Personal information
- Full name: Joseph Thomas Verdeur
- Nickname: "Joe"
- National team: United States
- Born: March 7, 1926 Philadelphia, Pennsylvania, U.S.
- Died: August 6, 1991 (aged 65) Bala Cynwyd, Pennsylvania, U.S.
- Height: 6 ft 0 in (1.83 m)

Sport
- Sport: Swimming
- Strokes: Breaststroke
- College team: La Salle University
Medal record
Representing the United States
Olympic Games
Gold medal – first place	1948 London	200 m breaststroke
Amateur Athletic Union
Gold medal – first place	1950 Indoor Championships	300 yd Medley
Silver medal – second place	1950 Indoor Championships	220 yd breaststroke
Gold medal – first place	1949 Outdoor Championships	300 m Medley
Gold medal – first place	1949 Outdoor Championships	200 m breaststroke
Silver medal – second place	1949 Indoor Championships	220 yd breaststroke
Gold medal – first place	1948 Outdoor Championships	200 m Individual Medley
Gold medal – first place	1948 Outdoor Championships	300 m Individual Medley
Gold medal – first place	1948 Indoor Championships	220 yd breaststroke
Gold medal – first place	1948 Indoor Championships	300 yd Individual Medley
Gold medal – first place	1947 Outdoor Championships	200 m breaststroke
Gold medal – first place	1947 Indoor Championships	220 yd breaststroke
Bronze medal – third place	1946 Outdoor Championships	300 yd Individual Medley
Gold medal – first place	1946 Indoor Championships	300 yd Individual Medley
Gold medal – first place	1946 Indoor Championships	220 yd breaststroke
Silver medal – second place	1945 Indoor Championships	220 yd breaststroke
Silver medal – second place	1945 Indoor Championships	300 yd Individual Medley.
Gold medal – first place	1944 Outdoor Championships	200 m Breaststroke.
Gold medal – first place	1944 Outdoor Championships	300 m Individual Medley.
Gold medal – first place	1944 Outdoor Championships	300 m Medley.
Gold medal – first place	1944 Indoor Championships	220 yd Breaststroke.
Silver medal – second place	1944 Indoor Championships	300 yd Individual Medley.
Gold medal – first place	1943 Outdoor Championships	220 yd Breaststroke.
Bronze medal – third place	1943 Outdoor Championships	330 yd Individual Medley.
Silver medal – second place	1942 Outdoor Championships	220 yd Breaststroke.
NCAA
Silver medal – second place	1950 Championships	200 yd breaststroke.
Silver medal – second place	1950 Championships	100 yd breaststroke.
Silver medal – second place	1949 Championships	200 m Breaststroke
Gold medal – first place	1948 Championships	200 yd Breaststroke
Eastern Intercollegiate League
Gold medal – first place	1950 Indoor Championships	300 yd Medley
Silver medal – second place	1950 Championships	200 yd breaststroke
Silver medal – second place	1950 Championships	100 yd breaststroke

Joseph Thomas Verdeur (March 7, 1926 – August 6, 1991) was an American competition swimmer, Olympic champion, and former world record-holder.

== Career ==
Verdeur was born in Philadelphia, Pennsylvania. He had a sister, Theresa, and a brother, Edward. His mother was Polish American, who was born in Poland as Sophie Machalowska. His father died when Joseph was six years old. Verdeur attended North Catholic High School in Philadelphia, and led the North Catholic Falcons swim team to three consecutive Catholic League championships and two city championships. He was also a two-time first-team All-Catholic swimmer.

While attending La Salle University, he set nineteen world and twenty-one American records swimming for the La Salle Explorers and was a four time All-American. His first world record came on April 5, 1946 breaking Alfred Nakache's 200 meter breaststroke record of 2:36.8 set in a long course pool. Verdeur set the record with a time of 2:35.6 in Bainbridge's 25 yard indoor pool at the National AAU Indoor Championships. FINA at the time recognized the world record in either short course (25 meter) or long course (50 meter) pools. Verdeur subsequently continued to reset this world record several times over in short course pools. His final world record came in the 1950 National AAU Indoor Championships in the 220 yard breaststroke (short course). This race was dual timed for both the 200 meter and 220 yard distances (short course). During the race, Verdeur broke the world record for 200 meters with a time of 2:28.3. However, Robert Brawner won the race with a time of 2:29.3 for the full 220 yards beating Verdeur who was second in 2:29.4. This record was superseded by Herbert Klein the next year in 1951.

As a member of the U.S. Olympic team at the 1948 Summer Olympics in London, Verdeur won a gold medal in the 200-meter breaststroke with a new Olympic record time of 2:39.3. This was the first Olympics since Berlin, Germany in 1936 and did not include athletes from Germany and Japan who were banned from participating. He may well have won more medals in the butterfly and individual medley if these had been included at the time as he was a multiple national champion and record-breaker in both events.

At the US Olympic trials of the 1948 4x200-meter freestyle relay, Verdeur was one of several swimmers who had already qualified in other events who slowed down in their heats or swam fast in the prelims and scratched themselves for the final to allow more swimmers to qualify for the US Olympic Team. Ultimately, coach Robert Kiphuth did hold a time trial shortly after the actual trials with eleven of the swimmers. This time trial had Jimmy McLane as first overall with a time of 2:11.0, Bill Smith and Wally Wolf in 2:11.2, and Wally Ris in 2:12.4. This quartet was used for the Olympic final. The next four-Eugene Rogers in 2:14.2, Edwin Gilbert in 2:15.4, Robert Gibe in 2:15.6, and William Dudley in 2:15.9, were used in the Olympic prelims. The next three swimmers-Joe Verdeur who came in 2:16.3, Alan Ford in 2;16.4 and George Hoogerhyde in 2:17.4 were not used in any capacity in the 4x200 freestyle relay.

Verdeur was named Swimmer of the Year by Sport Magazine in 1948 and 1949. He graduated from LaSalle in 1950. Sportswriter Grantland Rice called Verdeur "the greatest swimmer of the first half century." Verdeur received two votes in the 1950 Associated Press Poll of the Greatest Swimmer of the Past 50 years.

Verdeur was inducted into the International Swimming Hall of Fame in 1966, the La Salle University Athletic Hall of Fame in 1961, North Catholic Hall of Fame in 1991, The Helms Foundation Hall of Fame, the Philadelphia Sports Hall of Fame in 2005, and the National Polish American Hall of Fame in 2009. He died of cancer in Bala Cynwyd, Pennsylvania in 1991, aged 65. He was survived by his wife Mary Ellen Verdeur and their five children.

== Record notes ==
The world record for the 200 meter breaststroke prior the bifurcation of the butterfly breaststroke into separate strokes in 1953 could be accomplished in either short or long course pools. FINA recognized only one world record for the 200 meter breaststroke. Thus, when Alfred Nakache set the world record for the 200 meter breaststroke in 1941 in an outdoor long course pool, it was broken by Joe Verdeur in a short course pool. If records were measured as they are today in long and short course pools, Verdeur broke Nakache's long course world record of 2:36.8 in 1948 at the US Olympic trials with a time of 2:36.3.

== See also ==
- List of members of the International Swimming Hall of Fame
- List of Olympic medalists in swimming (men)
- World record progression 200 metres breaststroke
- List of La Salle University people

Records
Preceded by Alfred Nakache	Men's 200-meter breaststroke world record-holder (short course); April 5, 1946 – June 9, 1951	Succeeded by Herbert Klein
Preceded by Alfred Nakache	Men's 200-meter breaststroke world record-holder (long course); July 10, 1948 – June 9, 1951	Succeeded by Herbert Klein; John Davies
Preceded by Tetsuo Hamuro	Men's 200 m breaststroke Olympic record-holder August 7, 1948-July 28, 1952	Succeeded by Jerry Holan
Preceded by	Men's 300-yard Individual Medley; American record-holder (short course); April 1, 1949 – April 5, 1952	Succeeded by Burwell Jones
Preceded by	Men's 150-yard Individual Medley; American record-holder (long course); 1949 – August 3, 1951	Succeeded by Jimmy Thomas
