= Walter Pavlicek =

Austrian swimmer

Personal information
- Born: 25 April 1926
- Died: 24 November 2004 (aged 78)

Sport
- Sport: Swimming

Walter Pavlicek (25 April 1926 – 24 November 2004) was an Austrian swimmer. He competed in the men's 200 metre breaststroke at the 1948 Summer Olympics.
