= Anton Cerer =

Yugoslavian swimmer (1916–2006)

Personal information
- Born: October 30, 1916 Kamnik, Austro-Hungary
- Died: May 25, 2006 (aged 89) Cleveland, Ohio, U.S.

Sport
- Sport: Swimming
- Club: O*H*I*O Masters Swim Club
Medal record
Swimming
Representing Yugoslavia
European Championships
Bronze medal – third place	1938 London	200 m breaststroke
Silver medal – second place	1947 Monte Carlo	200 m breaststroke

Anton M. Cerer (October 30, 1916 – May 25, 2006) was the first Slovenian or Yugoslav swimmer to win a European medal. His career was interrupted by World War II, yet he competed at the Summer Olympics in 1936 and 1948 and European championships in 1938, 1947 and 1950. He won two European medals and finished fifth at the 1948 Olympics in the 200 m breaststroke event.

Cerer was born in Slovenia, formerly part of Yugoslavia, but in the 1950s emigrated to the United States. Between 1983 and 2002 he competed in the masters category and dominated world championships in his age group (above 80) in breaststroke, butterfly and medley disciplines. He died after slipping in a pool in Cleveland, Ohio, aged 90, while training for the FINA World Masters Championships.
