= Hermann Stefánsson =

Icelandic writer, musician and poet (born 1968)

Hermann Stefánson (born 25 July 1968 in Reykjavík) is an Icelandic writer, musician and poet. His novel Oblivion has been called a landmark in Icelandic literature. Hermann has published 13 books in total. His publication, Leiðin út í heim was nominated for the Íslensku bókmenntaverðlaunin in 2015.
