= Atli Steinarsson =

Icelandic swimmer

Personal information
- Born: 30 June 1929
- Died: 8 November 2017 (aged 88)

Sport
- Sport: Swimming

Atli Steinarsson (30 June 1929 – 8 November 2017) was an Icelandic swimmer. He competed in the men's 200 metre breaststroke at the 1948 Summer Olympics.
