= James Counsilman =

American swimming coach (1920–2004)

Doc Counsilman
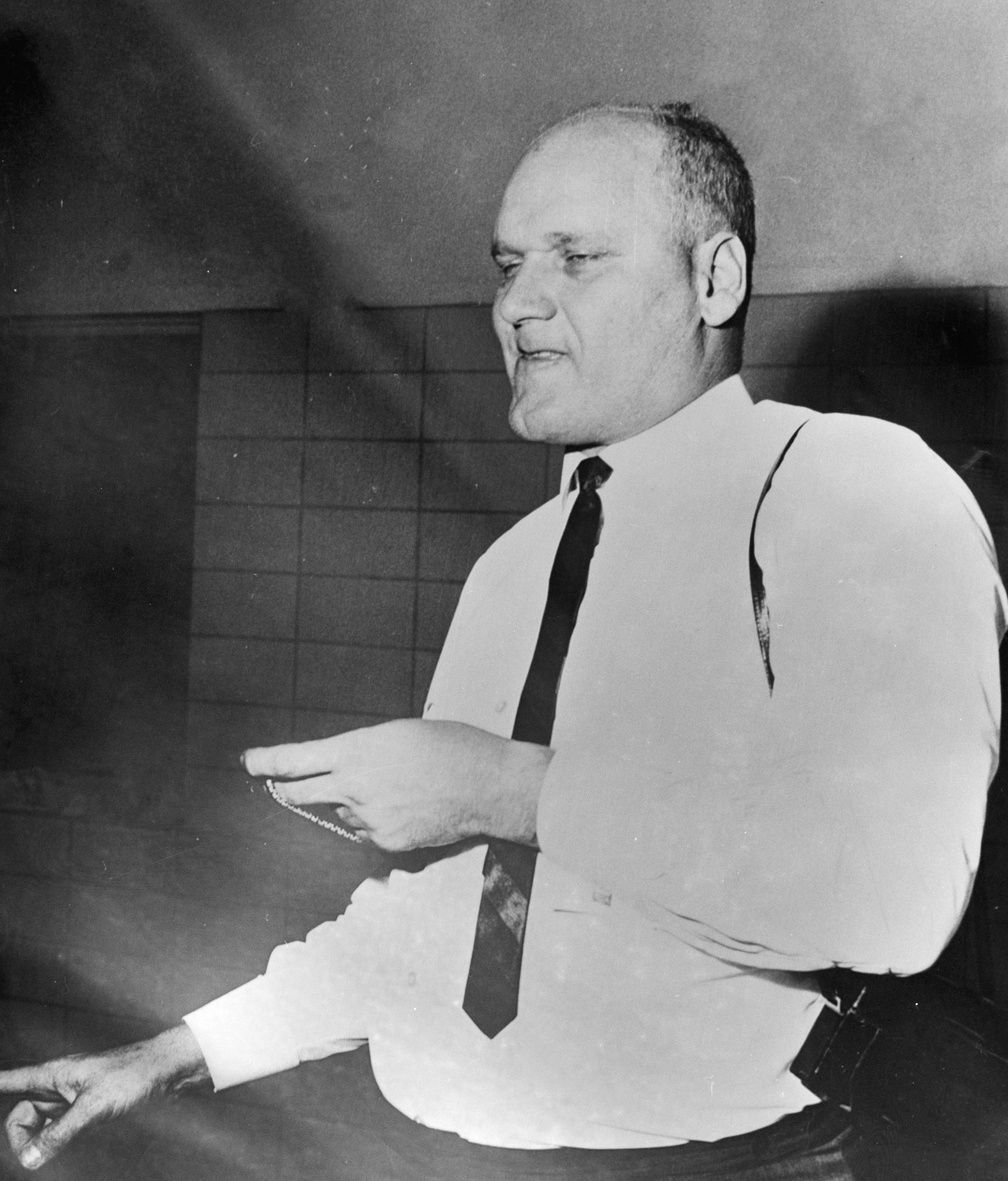
- Counsilman in 1963

Biographical details
- Born: December 28, 1920; Birmingham, Alabama, U.S.
- Died: January 4, 2004 (aged 83); Bloomington, Indiana, U.S.
- Education: Ohio State University BA '47; University of Illinois MA '48; University of Iowa Phd. '51

Playing career
- 1940–1942: Ohio State Buckeyes
- 1943-1945: U.S. Army Air Corps
- 1946–1947: Ohio State Buckeyes; Also Asst. to Coach Mike Peppe
- Position: Breaststroke

Coaching career (HC unless noted)
- 1947: University of Illinois (MA); Asst. to Coach Edward Manley
- 1948–1951: University of Iowa (Phd.); Asst. to Coach David Armbruster
- 1952–1957: Cortland State Red Dragons
- 1957–1990: Indiana Hoosiers
- 1964, 1976: U.S. Olympic Swim Team

Head coaching record
- Overall: 286-36-1 88.8 Win % (Indiana U.)

Accomplishments and honors

Championships
- NCAA (1968, 1969, 1970, 1971, 1972, 1973)

Awards
- International Swimming Hall of Fame (1976); Ohio State Hall of Fame (1988); Indiana U. Hall of Fame (2001); Distinguished Flying Cross (1945)
Medal record
Amateur Athletic Union
Bronze medal – third place	1946 Outdoor Championships	200 m Breaststroke
Gold medal – first place	1946 Indoor Championships	300 yd Medley Relay
Gold medal – first place	1942 Outdoor Championships	220 yd Breaststroke
Silver medal – second place	1941 Indoor Championships	220 yd Breaststroke

James Edward "Doc" Counsilman (December 28, 1920 – January 4, 2004) was a nationally recognized American swimming competitor in the breaststroke who competed for Ohio State, and a swimming coach best known for coaching Indiana University from 1957 to 1990. During his coaching tenure at Indiana, he established an exceptional record of 286-36-1 in meets, and led the Indiana University swimming team to 6 consecutive NCAA Men's Swimming and Diving Championships from 1968 to 1973. Counsilman trained and mentored a total of 48 Olympians. In addition to collegiate coaching, he served as head coach for the USA's Olympic swim teams at the 1964 Tokyo Olympics and the 1976 Montreal Olympics.

== Early life ==
James Edward Counsilman was born in Birmingham, Alabama on December 28, 1920, the youngest child of Otillia and Joseph Walter Counsilman, both of German descent. His father had worked for a Circus, and his mother managed boarding houses for hospitals. His parents separated when he was two years old, and his father moved him and his older brother to St. Louis when Counsilman was six. His mother later moved to St. Louis and raised him and his older brother there, where James grew up.

=== Early swimming ===
He began his swimming career at the East St. Louis YMCA. When he became more involved in swimming as a young man, he trained frequently at St. Louis's Forest Park YMCA, where he began to swim in national meets. He competed for his High School swim and track team at Ben Blewitt High School on Enright Avenue, graduating in 1937, and also enjoyed football, basketball, and diving. In track and field, he excelled in the high jump.

==== Coach Ernie Vronbock ====
He was coached by Ernie Vronbock in his youth at the Downtown YMCA on Locust Street in St. Louis which had a 25-yard, six lane pool. Vronbock, whom Counsilman first met in the 1930s, would coach at the Y about 2-3 times a week, and left written training workouts for resident Coach Ted Ohashi. Vronbock was an important influence on Counsilman's life, and encouraged him to go to college, despite Counsilman's lackluster high school grades and very low class standing. Vronbock would help train Counsilman for meets, and provide auto transportation to a few AAU national meets. Graduating high school in the midst of the depression, Counsilman worked for a few years, as a lineman for the telephone company before starting college at Ohio State.

Counsilman would specialize in the "butterfly-breaststroke", a form of swimming the breaststroke partly developed and popularized in the mid-1930's by Counsilman's future coaching mentor at Iowa State, David Armbruster. To reduce drag, the stroke featured the swimmer removing his hands from the water, entering them outstretched over the head and performing what has always been the shallow pull to the sides with opposite arms used by the breaststroke. Many "butterfly-breaststroke" swimmers incorporated the dolphin kick into the "butterfly-breaststroke" which was usually faster and more efficient than the traditional frog or whip kick traditionally used by breaststroke swimmers. In the 1950s, when the butterfly stroke was adopted as a separate stroke into competition, breaststrokers were required to use the traditional underwater recovery retaining the elbows in the water, and the frog or whip kick was again required for all breaststroke competitors.

=== Ohio State era ===
He swam for Ohio State University beginning in the Fall of 1941 under Hall of Fame Coach Mike Peppe, and while in college set world-records in the 50 and 300 yard breaststrokes. His former coach during his High School years, Ernie Vronboch who knew Coach Peppe, helped Counsilman gain admission to Ohio State. While a student, Counsilman worked part-time as an elevator operator at nights which gave him time to study, and he was provided a small room in a storage area. Counsilman was both a competitive swimmer and for about a year also served as an unpaid Assistant Coach under Peppe, who became an outstanding mentor. During his tenure as Coach, Peppe's Ohio State teams won 11 NCAA Championships and between 1943 and 1963 finished first or second in national competition in all but two years. After completing his military service in 1946, Counsilman returned to IU and served as a team Captain in 1946–47, graduating with a BA in physical education in 1947. In the summer of 1946, Counsilman and the Ohio State team trained with Coach Soichi Sakamoto in greater Honolulu, Hawaii. Sakamoto was a pioneer in interval training, and recognizing the advantages gained in training swimmers with long, demanding yardage. Counsilman placed first in the 200 breaststroke at the 1946 Big Ten Conference championship, taking second in the event at the 1946 NCAA championships. The Ohio State swim team won two NCAA championships during his time as a competitor.

On June 15, 1943, he married Marjorie "Marge" Scrafford whom he spent time with at the Ohio State pool while they were both students there and Jim was serving as a lifeguard. The couple would have four children. An English major while later completing her education at Indiana, Marge was an active participant in Counsilman's career, and served as an editor for his books and publications. During their marriage, she assisted Doc by helping to market and distribute his innovative swimming products. She occasionally helped with the swim team's college assignments, and often hosted team members for talking sessions and home dinners. For her own contributions to the sport, she was honored as Swimming's "Grand Dame" by the International Swimming Hall of Fame, and swam often for fitness, during her retirement.

==== Air Force service ====
Drafted after completing time at Ohio State, Counsilman reported for duty in March 1943, and served in the United States Army Air Forces. After completing training, he left for Europe in January, 1945, where he served in Italy as a B-24 Liberator pilot with the 455th Bomb Group of the Fifteenth Air Force. Acting as a pilot on bombing raids, he completed 32 missions through May, 1945. At the end of a bombing mission at the age of 24, German flak shot down the B-24 Counsilman was piloting, and damaged the plane's landing gear, requiring Counsilman to crash land in a field in Yugoslavia, near the town of Zagreb. His careful piloting allowed all of his crew to survive, and he received the air medal and the Distinguished Flying Cross for his flying expertice.

==== Awards in national competitions ====
As shown at right, at the bottom of the infobox under Medal record, in national competition Counsilman took second place in the 1941 indoor championship in the 220 yard breaststroke. He captured first place in the 1942 Outdoor Champion in the 220 yard breaststroke, third place in the 1946 Outdoor Championship in the 200 m breaststroke and first place in the 1942 Outdoor Championships in the 220 yard breaststroke.

=== Graduate education ===
After completing his undergraduate studies at Ohio State, Counsilman earned a master's degree in Science from the University of Illinois in 1948, where he served as an assistant coach under Head Coach Edward Manley.

Upon completion of his Masters, he pursued a doctorate degree in physiology from the University of Iowa with a focus on human performance where he studied under Hall of Fame Coach David Armbruster and also served as Armbruster' assistant swim coach from 1948 to 1951. He completed his degree in 1951, with his doctoral thesis addressing " “The Application of Force in the Crawl Stroke”. Armbruster was highly skilled in mentoring his swimmers in stroke technique, particularly the "breaststroke-butterfly", and the new butterfly after 1956. It was at Iowa that Counsilman coached his first two Olympians-Wally Ris and Bowen Stassforth.

== Coaching ==
As noted, Counsilman Assistant coached at Indiana, and during his graduate studies at both the University of Illinois and Iowa. Following award of his doctorate, the newly nicknamed "Doc" began teaching and coaching as a Head Coach at Cortland State University, where he stayed from 1952 to 1957, before beginning his career at Indiana University.

While serving at Cortland State, he coached freshman George Breen in 1953. Breen was molded by Counsilman into a standout athlete, and broke the world record for the 1500 meter freestyle. Breen, qualifying for the 1956 Olympic Games in Melbourne, set another world record in the 1500 meter freestyle with a time of 17:52.9 during the preliminaries, but was unable to match the time in the finals and received only a bronze medal. His Cortland swim teams captured conference titles in four years, and amassed a noteworthy record of 35–5 in meets against single teams.

=== Coaching at Indiana (1957–1990) ===
Counsilman began at Indiana as an assistant professor in 1956 and in 1966 was promoted to full professor. For several years, beginning around 1957, Counsilman assisted with coaching at the Indianapolis Athletic Club, an AAU National championship team, as a volunteer Assistant in addition to his responsibilities with the Indiana University swim team. Counsilman also coached the age group team at the Bloomington swim club during his early years in Bloomington.

Once at Indiana University, he continued to train George Breen, his former swimmer at Cortland State for the 1500 meter, an event for which Breen would receive a second bronze medal in the 1960 Olympics in Rome. Ultimately, Counsilman was credited with molding Breen into one of the finest Olympic distance swimmers in United States history.

==== IU Coaching achievements ====
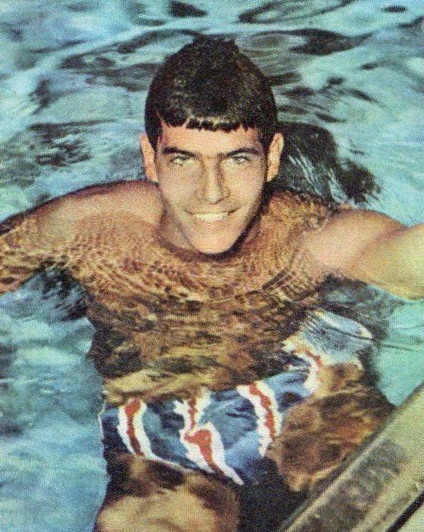
Mark Spitz in 1968

In dual meets, according to the International Swimming Hall of Fame, Counsilman's teams at Indiana amassed a record 286–36–1, for an exceptional winning percentage of 88.8. A few sources quote an Indiana record of 230–11 in dual meets, establishing a winning percentage of .954. For a seventeen-year period, his Indiana teams went undefeated for 140 successive meets from 1979 through 1996.

As an essential record of achievement, Counsilman coached the Indiana men's team to 6 consecutive NCAA Men's Swimming and Diving Championships from 1968 to 1973, largely during the swimming tenure of Mark Spitz. In regional conference competition, his Indiana teams won 20 consecutive Big 10 team championships from 1961 to 1980. In a broader view, from 1964–75, in addition to six NCAA national championships, Counsilman's teams had five second place finishes in National NCAA team competition. While at IU, Doc coached over 60 Olympic swimmers, including Mark Spitz.

In 1964, prior to the NCAA national championships, Counsilman led the Indiana team to its sixth straight USA national championship, as part of the AAU.

Counsilman and Joseph Hunnsaker, one of the Counsilman's former swimmers, founded the Counsilman-Hunsaker Company in 1970. The company helped provide information to engineering and architectural personnel on to how build competitive swimming pools, and later also built recreational pools.

==== Outstanding swimmers ====
Among the best known swimmers who swam for Counsilman were: Jim Montgomery, Gary Hall, John Kinsella, Mike Troy, Charlie Hickcox, Larry Barbiere, Don McKenzie, Chet Jastremski, Wally Ris, Bowen Stassforth, Tom Stock, George Breen, Mike Stamm, Alan Somers, Ted Stickles, John Murphy, Fred Tyler, John Waldman, Gary Conelly, Tom Hickcox, and Mark Spitz. While an Assistant Coach at the University of Iowa, Counsilman coached future Arizona State University Swim Coach Ron Johnson

In 1979, at the age of 58, Counsilman briefly became the oldest person to swim the English Channel, despite having already been diagnosed with Parkinson's Disease. The following year, he swam the mile from Alcatraz Island to the mainland in San Francisco.

=== Olympic coach ===
He served as the Men's Head Coach of the U.S. swimming team at the 1964 Tokyo Olympics, where the U.S. men's team captured 11 of the potential 21 individual event medals available to swimming competitors. He was later the U.S. Olympic coach at the 1976 Montreal Olympics where the U.S. men won 26 medals in individual events, setting eleven world records. Indiana swimmer Jim Montgomery won three gold medals and a bronze.

=== Contributions to the sport ===
Doc Counsilman is known as one of the greatest swimming coaches of all time. He was an innovator in the sport, pioneering underwater filming, and observing swimmers' underwater techniques, as can be seen in Royer Pool at Indiana University today. His former instructor and mentoring Head coach David Armbruster at the University of Iowa, was one of the earliest coaches to push for the use of underwater observation windows for competition pools. Counsilman influenced the development of pool design, pace clocks, and pool line markers, all essential in improving training opportunities, and lowering finish times. He was the primary instigator of hypoventilation training, a method consisting of swimming with reduced breathing frequency. The intent was to build lung capacity, adjust swimmers to higher altitude environments, and ultimately to build endurance. A sample training set that used hypoventilation training would have swimmers take a breath every two strokes, then every four strokes, then every six and start over at two strokes.

He served as the first President of the International Swimming Hall of Fame and also held office as the American Swim Coaches Association President.

Counsilman died in a retirement home in Bloomington, Indiana, in 2004, after having suffered from Parkinson's disease for a many years. He was buried in Clear Creek Cemetery, as would be his wife Marjorie in 2017.

== Honors ==
In 1961, he was named Coach of the Year by the American Swimming Coaches Association. He was made a member of the Indiana University Athletics Hall of Fame in 2001. He was inducted into the International Swimming Hall of Fame in 1976. In 1988, he became a member of the Ohio State University Hall of Fame. In a tribute to his completing a swim of the English channel at the age of 58, in 1981, he was honored with induction into the International Marathon Swimming Hall of Fame. In an honor from his first coaching position, he was made a member of the SUNY Cortland Athletic Hall of Fame in 2005. United States Aquatic Sports presented Counsilman with the R. Max Ritter Award for both his domestic and international achievements in the sport of swimming.

== See also ==
- List of members of the International Swimming Hall of Fame
- List of Ohio State University people

== Books by Counsilman ==
- The Science of Swimming, by James E. Counsilman, Prentice Hall, Juni 1968, ISBN 978-0-13-795385-1
- The Complete Book of Swimming , by James E. Counsilman, Atheneum, 1977, ISBN 978-0-689-10530-2
- Competitive Swimming Manual for Coaches and Swimmers, by James E. Counsilman, Counsilman Co., 1977, ISBN 978-0-253-31395-9
- The New Science of Swimming, by James E. Counsilman and Brian E. Counsilman, Prentice Hall, April 1994, ISBN 978-0-13-099888-0
