= Vladimír Skovajsa =

Slovak swimmer

Personal information
- Born: 4 May 1929 Nové Mesto nad Váhom, Czechoslovakia
- Died: 24 May 2002 (aged 73) Bratislava, Slovakia

Sport
- Sport: Swimming

Vladimír Skovajsa (4 May 1929 – 24 May 2002) was a Slovak swimmer. He competed in the men's 200 metre breaststroke at the 1952 Summer Olympics.

He practised winter swimming.
