= Eastern Intercollegiate League =

Eastern Intercollegiate League may refer to:

- Predecessor leagues of the Ivy League
- Eastern Intercollegiate Basketball League, 1901–55
- Eastern Intercollegiate Baseball League, 1930–92
- Eastern Intercollegiate Conference, 1932–39
- Eastern Intercollegiate Athletic Conference
- Eastern Intercollegiate Football Association
- Eastern Intercollegiate Gymnastics League
- Eastern Intercollegiate Ski Association
- Eastern Intercollegiate Volleyball Association
- Eastern Intercollegiate Wrestling Association

== See also ==
- Eastern College Athletic Conference
- List of college athletic conferences in the United States
