= Alfred Nakache =

Algerian-born French swimmer and water polo player (1915–1983)

- Nakache in 1938

Personal information
- Born: Alfred Nakache; 18 November 1915 Constantine, French Algeria
- Died: 4 August 1983 (aged 67) Cerbère, France

Sport
- Sport: Swimming
Medal record
Representing France
European Championships
Silver medal – second place	1938 London	4×200 m freestyle

Alfred "Artem" Nakache (18 November 1915 – 4 August 1983) was a French swimmer and water polo player. A member of the French team for the 1936 Berlin Summer Olympic Games, he also swam in the first post-war Summer Olympics in London in 1948. He, Agnes Keleti, and Ben Helfgott are the only known Jewish athletes to have competed in the Olympics after surviving the Holocaust.

== Biography ==
Nakache was the second child of an eleven children Jewish family, who had migrated to Algeria from Iraq in the 19th century. Though he initially had a fear of water, he managed to overcome it. In 1931, he won the Constantine Christmas Cup.

After his first local swimming competitions, in which he was not even aware he had to follow the lane lines, Nakache progressed rapidly. In 1933, he participated in his first French championships, and moved to Paris at the end of the summer.

At the 1934 French Championships, Nakache finished second in the 100-meter freestyle behind Jean Taris and was selected for the French team for a junior meet against the Netherlands. As a Frenchman born outside of France and not yet registered with a club in France, he was barred from participation in the European Championships. Nevertheless, Nakache participated in the Tour de France Nautique team.

Nakache was licensed at the Racing Club de France from 1934 to 1936, and enrolled in 1934 at the Lycée Janson-de-Sailly. He participated in preparatory meets for the 1936 Summer Olympics, and that same year, broke the European record in the 4 x 200m relay in 9 minutes 22 seconds with Jean Taris, René Cavalero, and Diener. As a Jewish athlete in the Nazi-run Berlin Olympics, he finished fourth place in the 4 x 200 m freestyle relay with Taris, Cavalero, and Christian Talli, placing them ahead of Nazi Germany.

On 6 October 1937, he married his wife Paule Elbaze, who was also an Algerian Jew.

Nakache was a member of the Paris Nautical Club from 1937 to 1938, and apparently departed due to racist and anti-Semitic insults. During this time, he completed his military service at Air Base 117 in Paris.

In 1939, Nakache passed the examination to become a physical education teacher. He subsequently enrolled at the ENSEP (later called INSEP), as did his wife Paule.

Nakache set the world record in the 200 metre breaststroke with a time of 2:36.8 on 6 July 1941 in the long course seawater pool in Catalans in Marseilles. Since FINA at the time recognised world records set in either short course (25 metre) or long course (50 metre) pools for the 200 metre breaststroke, his record was easily broken by Joe Verdeur in 1946 in a short course pool. If records were measured as they are today in long and short course pools, Verdeur would have broken Nakache's long course world record of 2:36.8 in 1948 at the US Olympic trials with a time of 2:36.3. With Alexandre Jany and Georges Vallerey Jr., he broke the world record for 3 X 100m medley on 8 August 1946.

When Philippe Pétain abolished the Crémieux Decree, as an Algerian Jew, Nakache was stripped of his French nationality. As teachers and as Jews, he and his wife had to leave Paris in order to continue working, and settled with their daughter in Toulouse. He joined underground resistance networks in Toulouse, including the Jewish Army.

The sports commissioner for the Vichy regime, Jean Borotra, took Nakache on a tour of French North Africa, and Nakache was chosen several times to participate in the flag-raising ceremony. In 1942, Nakache won five French championship titles in the 200m breaststroke, 4 x 200m freestyle relay, and the 100m, 200m, and 400m freestyle.

Though Nakache was initially prominent during the occupation of France for his records and became one of the country's most decorated swimmers, he was gradually denounced as a Jew by the collaborationist press. Finally, he was banned from the pool during French championships in Toulouse in 1943, leading to a boycott by his teammates from the local swimming club.

On 20 November 1943, following a denunciation, Nakache and his family were arrested by the Gestapo. He was held captive at the Saint-Michel Prison in Toulouse, before being sent to the Drancy internment camp.

The family were deported to Auschwitz on Convoy No. 66 out of Drancy, leaving Bobigny station on 20 January 1944. They arrived at Auschwitz three days later, and Nakache was physically separated from his wife and daughter, never to see them again.

Nakache was assigned to the camp infirmary, where he was able to receive food rations intended for the sick.

In January 1945, as Auschwitz was evacuated while the Red Army advanced, Nakache was sent on a death march, ultimately ending up in Buchenwald, where he was liberated by American troops in April 1945.

Alfred was the only one of his family to survive the Holocaust.

Alfred later married a woman named Marie. After ending his career in Reunion Island, he died in Cerbère, France on 4 August 1983, after becoming ill while swimming in the port. He was buried in the Le Py cemetery in Sète.

== Legacy ==
Nakache was inducted into the International Jewish Sports Hall of Fame in 1993 and the International Swimming Hall of Fame in 2019.

Nakache was the subject of two French documentaries: Alfred Nakache, the Swimmer of Auschwitz (2001), directed by Christian Meunier, and Nage Libre (2017), directed by Thierry Lashéras, coproduced by EVA Productions and France Télévisions, with the participation of French Olympic swimmer Fabien Gilot, in the steps of Nakache. His life inspired the 2024 French Oscar-nominated short animated film Butterfly (Papillon) by Florence Miailhe, whose father knew Nakache during the war.

== Records and championships ==
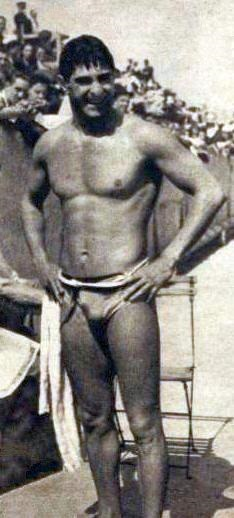
Alfred Nakache at the French swimming championships in Toulouse, September 1941

- World—200 m butterfly—1941
- World—relay 3 X 100 m3 strokes—1946
- Europe—100 m butterfly—1941
- France—400 m butterfly—1943
- France—relay 4 X 200 m freestyle—1946
- Champion of France—100 m freestyle in 1935–38, and 1941–42
- Champion of France—200 m freestyle in 1937–38, and 1941–42
- Champion of France—200 m butterfly in 1938, 1941–42, and 1946
- Champion of France—400 m freestyle in 1942
- Champion of France—relay 4 X 200 m freestyle in 1937–39, 1942, 1944–52 (13 titles, including 9 consecutive)
- University champion—100 m freestyle in 1936
- Champion of North Africa—100 m freestyle in 1931
- Maccabiah Games silver medal in 1935–100 m freestyle

== See also ==
- List of select Jewish swimmers
- World record progression 200 metres breaststroke

Records
Preceded by Jack Kasley	Men's 200-metre breaststroke world record-holder (long course); 6 July 1941 – 10 July 1948	Succeeded by Joe Verdeur
