= Sigurður Th. Jónsson =

Icelandic swimmer

Sigurður Jónsson
Personal information
- Born: 23 July 1924 Ystafell, Iceland
- Died: 13 March 2003 (aged 78) Ystafell, Iceland

Sport
- Sport: Swimming

Sigurður Jónsson (23 July 1924 – 13 March 2003) was an Icelandic swimmer. He competed in the men's 200 metre breaststroke at the 1948 Summer Olympics.
