= Sigurður Jónsson (swimmer) =

Icelandic swimmer (1922–2019)

Personal information
- Born: 20 December 1922 Iceland
- Died: 21 April 2019 (aged 96)

Sport
- Sport: Swimming

Sigurður Jónsson (20 December 1922 – 21 April 2019) was an Icelandic swimmer. He competed in the men's 200 metre breaststroke at the 1948 Summer Olympics.
