= Swimming at the 1951 Mediterranean Games – Results =

These are the complete results of the finals of swimming events at the inaugural 1951 Mediterranean Games which took place between 5 and 20 October in Alexandria, Egypt.

Only seven events were contested, open to male swimmers only.

== Results ==
=== 100 m freestyle ===
| Rank | Athlete | Nationality | Time | Notes |
|---|---|---|---|---|
| 1st place, gold medalist(s) | Alexandre Jany | France | 58.9 | GR |
| 2nd place, silver medalist(s) | Carlo Pedersoli | Italy | 59.7 | |
| 3rd place, bronze medalist(s) | Jean Boiteux | France | 60.0 | |
| 4 | Roberto Queralt | Spain | 60.5 | |
| 5 | Ricardo Conde | Spain | 60.9 | |
| 6 | Dorri Abdel Kader El-Said | Egypt | 61.0 | |
| 7 | Manuel Guerra | Spain | 61.1 | |
| 8 | Abdel Aziz El-Shafei | Egypt | 61.6 | |

=== 400 m freestyle ===
| Rank | Athlete | Nationality | Time | Notes |
|---|---|---|---|---|
| 1st place, gold medalist(s) | Jean Boiteux | France | 4:47.5 | GR |
| 2nd place, silver medalist(s) | Joseph Bernardo | France | 4:53.3 | |
| 3rd place, bronze medalist(s) | Enrique Granados | Spain | 4:57.0 | |
| 4 | Isidoro Ferry | Spain | 5:02.1 | |
| 5 | Angelo Romani | Italy | 5:06.8 | |
| 6 | Roberto Queralt | Spain | 5:08.1 | |
| 7 | Aldo Samoiedo | Italy | 5:11.0 | |
| 8 | Hakim | Egypt | 5:28.0 | |

=== 1500 m freestyle ===
| Rank | Athlete | Nationality | Time | Notes |
|---|---|---|---|---|
| 1st place, gold medalist(s) | Jean Boiteux | France | 19:32.9 | GR |
| 2nd place, silver medalist(s) | Joseph Bernardo | France | 19:40.3 | |
| 3rd place, bronze medalist(s) | Enrique Granados | Spain | 19:59.5 | |
| 4 | Jorge Granados | Spain | 20:34.0 | |
| 5 | Isidoro Ferry | Spain | 21:22.4 | |
| 6 | El Bahnassawy | Egypt | 22:45.6 | |

=== 100 m backstroke ===
| Rank | Athlete | Nationality | Time | Notes |
|---|---|---|---|---|
| 1st place, gold medalist(s) | Gilbert Bozon | France | 1:07.2 | GR |
| 2nd place, silver medalist(s) | Egidio Massaria | Italy | 1:11.3 | |
| 3rd place, bronze medalist(s) | Angelo Romani | Italy | 1:12.0 | |
| 4 | Dorri Abdel Kader El-Said | Egypt | 1:12.7 | |
| 5 | Antonio Quevedo | Spain | 1:14.4 | |
| 6 | O. H. Gohar | Egypt | 1:15.8 | |
| 7 | A. Abdel Wahad | Egypt | 1:17.8 | |
| 8 | C. Klat | Lebanon | 1:17.8 | |

=== 200 m breaststroke ===
| Rank | Athlete | Nationality | Time | Notes |
|---|---|---|---|---|
| 1st place, gold medalist(s) | Maurice Lusien | France | 2:41.9 | GR |
| 2nd place, silver medalist(s) | Jesús Domínguez | Spain | 2:43.7 | |
| 3rd place, bronze medalist(s) | Giorgio Grilz | Italy | 2:48.0 | |
| 4 | Mouktar Hallouda Awad | Egypt | 2:55.4 | |
| 5 | A. Faidalla | Egypt | 3:03.1 | |
| 6 | M. T. Hussein | Egypt | 3:07.0 | |

=== 4 × 200 m freestyle relay ===
| Rank | Athlete | Nationality | Time | Notes |
|---|---|---|---|---|
| 1st place, gold medalist(s) | N/A | France | 9:05.2 | GR |
| 2nd place, silver medalist(s) | N/A | Spain | 9:16.3 | |
| 3rd place, bronze medalist(s) | N/A | Egypt | 9:23.8 | |
| 4 | N/A | Italy | 9:27.7 | |

=== 3 × 100 m medley relay ===
| Rank | Athlete | Nationality | Time | Notes |
|---|---|---|---|---|
| 1st place, gold medalist(s) | N/A | France | 3:17.2 | GR |
| 2nd place, silver medalist(s) | N/A | Italy | 3:23.0 | |
| 3rd place, bronze medalist(s) | N/A | Spain | 3:23.9 | |
| 4 | N/A | Egypt | 3:26.2 | |
| 5 | N/A | Lebanon | 3:52.5 | |
