= Belgium at the 1952 Summer Olympics =

- IOC code: BEL
- NOC: Belgian Olympic Committee

in Helsinki
- Competitors: 135 (130 men and 5 women) in 16 sports
- Flag bearer: Charles Debeur
- Medals Ranked 14th: Gold 2 Silver 2 Bronze 0 Total 4

Summer Olympics appearances (overview)
- 1900; 1904; 1908; 1912; 1920; 1924; 1928; 1932; 1936; 1948; 1952; 1956; 1960; 1964; 1968; 1972; 1976; 1980; 1984; 1988; 1992; 1996; 2000; 2004; 2008; 2012; 2016; 2020; 2024

Other related appearances
- 1906 Intercalated Games

Belgium competed at the 1952 Summer Olympics in Helsinki, Finland. 135 competitors, 130 men and 5 women, took part in 75 events in 16 sports.

== Medalists ==
=== Gold ===
- André Noyelle – Cycling, Men's Individual Road Race
- Robert Grondelaers, André Noyelle and Lucien Victor – Cycling, Men's Team Road Race

=== Silver ===
- Robert Grondelaers – Cycling, Men's Individual Road Race
- Bob Baetens and Michel Knuysen – Rowing, Men's Coxless Pairs

== Athletics ==
Key

- Note–Ranks given for track events are within the athlete's heat only
- Q = Qualified for the next round
- q = Qualified for the next round as a fastest loser

Men
Track & road events

Athlete	Event	Heat		Quarterfinal		Semifinal		Final	
Athlete	Event	Result	Rank	Result	Rank	Result	Rank	Result	Rank
Fernand Linssen	200 m	22.37	3	Did not advance					
Roger Moens	400 m	48.71	3	Did not advance					
Albert Lowagie	400 m	50.26	5	Did not advance					
Antoine Uyterhoeven	400 m	50.21	5	Did not advance					
Louis Desmet	800 m	1:52.9	4	—N/a		Did not advance			
Oscar Soetewey	800 m	1:55.4	4	—N/a		Did not advance			
Lucien Demuynck	800 m	1:57.4	6	—N/a		Did not advance			
Gaston Reiff	1500 m	DNS		—N/a		Did not advance			
Daniel Janssens	1500 m	3:55.8	7	—N/a		Did not advance			
Frans Herman	1500 m	3:56.2	2 Q	—N/a		3:53.8	9	Did not advance	
Gaston Reiff	5000 m	14:23.8	3 Q	—N/a				DNF	
Lucien Theys	5000 m	14:22.2	4 Q	—N/a				14:59.0	14
Alphonse Vandenrydt	5000 m	15:51.2	15	—N/a				Did not advance	
Marcel Vandewattyne	10,000 m	—N/a						31:15.8	22
Alphonse Vandenrydt	10,000 m	—N/a						33:13.4	29
Robert Schoonjans	3000 m steeplechase	9:30.6	8	—N/a				Did not advance	
Albert Lowagie; Antoine Uyterhoeven; Roger Moens; Fernand Linssen	4 × 400 m relay	3:15.8	4	—N/a				Did not advance	
Charles Dewachtere	Marathon	—N/a						2:34:32.0	18
Jean Simonet	Marathon	—N/a						2:35:43.0	23
Jean Leblond	Marathon	—N/a						2:40:37.0	32

Field events

Athlete	Event	Qualification		Final	
Athlete	Event	Result	Rank	Result	Rank
Walter Herssens	Triple jump	13.52	33	Did not advance	
Jacques Delelienne	High jump	1.87	10 Q	1.90	9
Walter Herssens	High jump	1.84	30	Did not advance	
Raymond Kintziger	Discus throw	41.46	30	Did not advance	
Henri Haest	Hammer throw	49.08	24	48.78	22

== Basketball ==
Men's Team Competition

- Qualification Round (Group A)
  - Lost to Cuba (51–59)
  - Defeated Switzerland (59–49)
  - Lost to Cuba (63–71) → did not advance

== Cycling ==
Road Competition

Men's Individual Road Race (190.4 km)

- André Noyelle – 5:06:03.4 (→ Gold Medal)
- Robert Grondelaers – 5:06:51.2 (→ Silver Medal)
- Lucien Victor – 5:07:52.0 (→ 4th place)
- Rik Van Looy – did not finish (→ no ranking)

Track Competition

Men's 1.000m Time Trial

- Joseph De Bakker
  - Final – 1:14.7 (→ 10th place)

Men's 1.000m Sprint Scratch Race

- Stéphan Martens – 10th place

Men's 4.000m Team Pursuit

- Gabriel Glorieux, José Pauwels, Paul De Paepe, and Robert Raymond
  - Eliminated in quarterfinals (→ 5th place)

Men's 2.000m Tandem Race

- Gabriel Glorieux, Pierre Gosselin – 10th place

== Fencing ==
14 fencers, all men, represented Belgium in 1952.

Men's foil

- André Verhalle
- Paul Valcke
- Gustave Ballister

Men's team foil

- Pierre Van Houdt, André Verhalle, Alex Bourgeois, Paul Valcke, Édouard Yves, Gustave Ballister

Men's épée

- Jean-Baptiste Maquet
- Ghislain Delaunois
- Robert Henrion

Men's team épée

- Ghislain Delaunois, Jean-Baptiste Maquet, Albert Bernard, Robert Henrion, Paul Valcke

Men's sabre

- Gustave Ballister
- François Heywaert
- Marcel Van Der Auwera

Men's team sabre

- Marcel Van Der Auwera, Gustave Ballister, François Heywaert, Robert Bayot, Georges de Bourguignon, Édouard Yves

== Modern pentathlon ==
One male pentathlete represented Belgium in 1952.

- Francis Plumerel

== Rowing ==
Belgium had 12 male rowers participate in five out of seven rowing events in 1952.

Men's single sculls

- Henri Steenacker

Men's double sculls

- Robert George
- Jos Van Stichel

Men's coxless pair

- Michel Knuysen
- Bob Baetens

Men's coxed pair

- Hippolyte Mattelé
- Eugène Jacobs
- Kamiel Van Dooren (cox)

Men's coxless four

- Charles Van Antwerpen
- Jos Rosa
- Harry Elzendoorn
- Florent Caers

== Shooting ==
Four shooters represented Belgium in 1952.

50 m rifle, three positions

- Frans Lafortune
- Jacques Lafortune

50 m rifle, prone

- Frans Lafortune
- Jacques Lafortune

Trap

- Albert Fichefet
- Gaston Van Roy

== Swimming ==
Men

Ranks given are within the heat.

Athlete	Event	Heat		Semifinal		Final	
Athlete	Event	Time	Rank	Time	Rank	Time	Rank
Ludovicus Schoenmaekers	200 m breaststroke	2:46.5	5	Did not advance			
Kamiel Reynders; Joseph Anthoon; Marcel Anthoon; Alfons Bierebeek	4 × 200 m freestyle relay	9:45.5	5	—N/a		Did not advance	

Women

Ranks given are within the heat.

Athlete	Event	Heat		Semifinal		Final	
Athlete	Event	Time	Rank	Time	Rank	Time	Rank
Sybille Verckist	100 m freestyle	1:13.7	6	Did not advance			
Huguette Peeters	400 m freestyle	5:29.8	2 Q	5:36.5	8	Did not advance	
Sybille Verckist	400 m freestyle	5:40.1	6	Did not advance			
Raymonde Vergauwen	200 m breaststroke	3:02.8	2 Q	3:02.6	5	Did not advance	
Nicole Guilini; Huguette Peeters; Irène Possemiers; Sybille Verckist	4 × 100 m freestyle relay	4:54.8	6	—N/a		Did not advance	
