= France at the 1955 Mediterranean Games =

- IOC code: FRA
- NOC: French Olympic Committee

in Barcelona, Spain
- Competitors: 278 (all men)
- Medals Ranked 1st: Gold 39 Silver 29 Bronze 31 Total 99

Mediterranean Games appearances (overview)
- 1951; 1955; 1959; 1963; 1967; 1971; 1975; 1979; 1983; 1987; 1991; 1993; 1997; 2001; 2005; 2009; 2013; 2018; 2022; 2026

France competed at the 1955 Mediterranean Games in Barcelona, Spain.

== Medalists ==
=== By sport ===
| Sport | Gold | Silver | Bronze | Total |
| Athletics | 10 | 10 | 8 | 28 |
| Swimming | 8 | 2 | 2 | 12 |
| Shooting | 4 | 3 | 4 | 11 |
| Rowing | 4 | 1 | 2 | 7 |
| Fencing | 4 | 1 | 0 | 5 |
| Boxing | 4 | 0 | 4 | 8 |
| Gymnastics | 1 | 4 | 3 | 8 |
| Weightlifting | 1 | 1 | 2 | 4 |
| Diving | 1 | 1 | 0 | 2 |
| Wrestling | 1 | 1 | 0 | 2 |
| Rugby | 1 | 0 | 0 | 1 |
| Sailing | 0 | 2 | 1 | 3 |
| Equestrian | 0 | 1 | 1 | 2 |
| Cycling | 0 | 1 | 0 | 1 |
| Water polo | 0 | 1 | 0 | 1 |
| Field hockey | 0 | 0 | 1 | 1 |
| Football | 0 | 0 | 1 | 1 |
| Roller hockey | 0 | 0 | 1 | 1 |
| Total | 39 | 29 | 30 | 98 |

=== Gold ===
- Jacques Degats — Athletics, 400 metres
- Alain Mimoun — Athletics, 5000 metres
- Alain Mimoun — Athletics, 10,000 metres
- Philippe Candau — Athletics, 110 metres hurdles
- Guy Cury — Athletics, 400 metres hurdles
- Jacques Degats, Pierre Haarhoff, René Galland, Jean-Paul Martin du Gard — Athletics, 4 x 400 metres relay
- Maurice Fournier — Athletics, High jump
- Éric Battista — Athletics, Triple jump
- Raymond Thomas — Athletics, Shot put
- Michel Macquet — Athletics, Javelin throw
- Henri Butel — Rowing, Single sculls
- Jacques Maillet, Raymond Salles — Rowing, Double sculls
- ?? — Rowing, Coxless pairs
- Édouard Leguery, Claude Martin — Rowing, Coxed pairs
- Alphonse Halimi — Boxing, –54 kg
- Georges Henny — Boxing, –57 kg
- Hippolyte Annex — Boxing, –63.5 kg
- Gilbert Chapron — Boxing, –81 kg
- Christian d'Oriola — Fencing, Individual foil
- Roger Closset, René Coicaud, Christian d'Oriola, Adrien Rommel — Fencing, Team foil
- Jacques Lefèvre — Individual sabre
- Roger Closset, Daniel Dagallier, Armand Mouyal, René Queyroux — Fencing, Team épée
- René Changeat — Gymnastics, Vault
- Jean Debuf — Weightlifting, –90 kg
- Roger Bielle — Wrestling, Freestyle –67 kg
- Aldo Eminente — Swimming, Freestyle 100 metres
- Jean Boiteux — Swimming, Freestyle 400 metres
- Jean Boiteux — Swimming, Freestyle 1500 metres
- Gilbert Bozon — Swimming, Backstroke 100 metres
- Hugues Broussard — Swimming, Breaststroke 200 metres
- Maurice Lusien — Swimming, Butterfly 200 metres
- Jean Boiteux, Aldo Eminente, Alex Jany, Guy Montserret — Swimming, 4 × 200 m freestyle relay
- Gilbert Bozon, Hugues Broussard, Aldo Eminente, Maurice Lusien — Swimming, 4 × 100 m medley relay
- Christian Pire — Diving, 3 metre springboard
- ??? — Rugby, Team
- Jacques Esnault — Shooting, 50 metre small-bore rifle standing
- Jacques Mazoyer — Shooting, 50 metre small-bore rifle kneeling
- Jacques Mazoyer — Shooting, 50 metre small-bore rifle 3 positions
- Jacques Mazoyer — Shooting, mobile silhouette rifle

=== Silver ===
- Jacques Lefèvre, Jean Levavasseur, Marcel Parent, Jacques Roulot — Fencing, Team sabre

=== Bronze ===
- Jean-Jacques Guissart, ??? — Rowing, Coxed fours
- Pierre Blondiaux, Yves Delacour, René Guissart, René Lotti, ????? — Rowing, Eights
- Pierre Court, Pierre Guerin, Claude Hauet, Jean Hauet, Diran Manoukian, Philippe Reynaud, Jean Zizine — Field hockey, Team
