= Swimming at the 1952 Summer Olympics – Men's 100 metre freestyle =

Men's 100 metre freestyle at the Games of the XV Olympiad
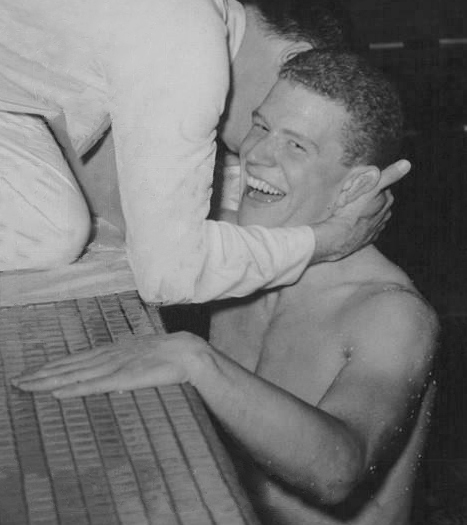
- Clarke Scholes
- Venue: Helsinki Swimming Stadium
- Dates: 26 July 1952 (heats); 27 July 1952 (semifinals & final)
- Competitors: 61 from 33 nations
- Winning time: 57.4

Medalists
1st place, gold medalist(s)		Clarke Scholes; United States
2nd place, silver medalist(s)		Hiroshi Suzuki; Japan
3rd place, bronze medalist(s)		Göran Larsson; Sweden

The men's 100 metre freestyle event at the 1952 Summer Olympics took place between 26 and 27 July at the Helsinki Swimming Stadium. There were 61 competitors from 33 nations. Nations had been limited to three swimmers each since the 1924 Games. The event was won by Clarke Scholes of the United States, the nation's second consecutive and seventh overall victory in the men's 100 metre freestyle (most of any nation). Japan, absent from the 1948 Games after World War II, returned to the podium in the event with Hiroshi Suzuki's silver. Göran Larsson earned Sweden's first medal in the event since 1908 with his bronze.

== Background ==
This was the 11th appearance of the men's 100 metre freestyle. The event has been held at every Summer Olympics except 1900 (when the shortest freestyle was the 200 metres), though the 1904 version was measured in yards rather than metres.

Two of the eight finalists from the 1948 Games returned: bronze medalist Géza Kádas of Hungary and fifth-place finisher (and European champion) Alex Jany of France. There was no clear front-runner this year; Dick Cleveland was the closest to a favorite.

Ceylon, Guatemala, Hong Kong, Israel, Portugal, Romania, Singapore, South Africa, the Soviet Union, Venezuela, and Vietnam each made their debut in the event. The United States made its 11th appearance, having competed at each edition of the event to date.

== Competition format ==
The competition used a three-round (heats, semifinals, final) format. The advancement rule was new, introducing a major change from the format used from 1912 to 1948. A swimmer's place in the heat was no longer used to determine advancement; instead, the fastest times from across all heats in a round were used. There were 9 heats of 6 or 7 swimmers each. The top 24 swimmers advanced to the semifinals. There were 3 semifinals of 8 swimmers each. The top 8 swimmers advanced to the final. Swim-offs were used as necessary to break ties.

This swimming event used freestyle swimming, which means that the method of the stroke is not regulated (unlike backstroke, breaststroke, and butterfly events). Nearly all swimmers use the front crawl or a variant of that stroke. Because an Olympic size swimming pool is 50 metres long, this race consisted of two lengths of the pool.

== Records ==
These were the standing world and Olympic records (in seconds) prior to the 1952 Summer Olympics.

World record	Alan Ford (USA)	55.4	New Haven, United States	29 June 1948
Olympic record	Wally Ris (USA)	57.3	London, United Kingdom	31 July 1948

Clarke Scholes broke the Olympic record in the first semifinal with 57.1 seconds.

== Schedule ==
Date	Time	Round
Saturday, 26 July 1952	17:00	Heats
Sunday, 27 July 1952	17:00	Semifinals; Final

== Results ==
=== Heats ===
The 24 fastest swimmers from nine heats advanced to the semifinals.

Rank	Heat	Swimmer	Nation	Time	Notes
1	6	Göran Larsson	Sweden	57.5	Q
2	4	Dick Cleveland	United States	57.8	Q
3	5	Ronald Gora	United States	58.0	Q
3	1	Yoshihiro Hamaguchi	Japan	58.0	Q
3	4	Hiroshi Suzuki	Japan	58.0	Q
6	3	Rex Aubrey	Australia	58.2	Q
6	1	Aldo Eminente	France	58.2	Q
8	8	Toru Goto	Japan	58.3	Q
8	6	Clarke Scholes	United States	58.3	Q
10	9	Géza Kádas	Hungary	58.4	Q
11	4	Carlo Pedersoli	Italy	58.8	Q
12	3	Lev Balandin	Soviet Union	58.9	Q
12	3	Alex Jany	France	58.9	Q
12	7	Jack Wardrop	Great Britain	58.9	Q
15	5	György Ipacs	Hungary	59.1	Q
15	8	Joris Tjebbes	Netherlands	59.1	Q
17	2	Ronald Roberts	Great Britain	59.5	Q
17	9	Thomas Welsh	Great Britain	59.5	Q
19	3	John Durr	South Africa	1:00.0	Q
19	6	Nicasio Silverio	Cuba	1:00.0	Q
19	9	Vladimir Skomarovsky	Soviet Union	1:00.0	Q
22	8	Endel Edasi	Soviet Union	1:00.1	Q
23	3	Cheung Kin Man	Hong Kong	1:00.3	Q
24	7	Lucien Beaumont	Canada	1:00.4	Q
25	2	Olle Johansson	Sweden	1:00.5	
25	1	René Muñiz	Mexico	1:00.5	
25	1	Iosif Novac	Romania	1:00.5	
28	2	Neo Chwee Kok	Singapore	1:00.6	
28	2	Frank O'Neill	Australia	1:00.6	
30	5	Juan Lanz	Mexico	1:00.9	
30	5	Michel Vandamme	France	1:00.9	
32	9	Peter Salmon	Canada	1:01.0	
33	5	Pentti Ikonen	Finland	1:01.1	
34	4	Haroldo Lara	Brazil	1:01.2	
34	4	Federico Zwanck	Argentina	1:01.2	
36	8	Dennis Ford	South Africa	1:01.3	
37	7	Alberto Isaac	Mexico	1:01.4	
37	9	Lars Svantesson	Sweden	1:01.4	
39	7	Marcello Trabucco	Argentina	1:01.5	
40	6	Roberto Queralt	Spain	1:01.6	
41	5	Oscar Saiz	Venezuela	1:01.7	
42	6	Aram Boghossian	Brazil	1:02.0	
42	5	Abdel Aziz El-Shafei	Egypt	1:02.0	
42	1	Leo Telivuo	Finland	1:02.0	
45	8	Per Olsen	Norway	1:02.1	
46	8	Alfonso Buonocore	Italy	1:02.3	
46	7	Dorri El-Said	Egypt	1:02.3	
48	6	Mauno Valkeinen	Finland	1:02.5	
49	1	Ricardo Conde	Spain	1:02.6	
49	4	Fernando Madeira	Portugal	1:02.6	
51	3	Hernán Avilés	Chile	1:02.8	
52	2	Francisco Monteiro	Hong Kong	1:03.1	
53	7	Guilherme Patroni	Portugal	1:03.7	
54	2	Robert Cook	Bermuda	1:04.1	
54	8	Geoffrey Marks	Ceylon	1:04.1	
56	3	Walter Bardgett	Bermuda	1:04.4	
57	9	José Valdes	Guatemala	1:04.5	
58	6	Nguyễn Văn Phan	Vietnam	1:05.0	
59	1	Nahum Buch	Israel	1:05.6	
60	7	Michel Currat	Switzerland	1:07.2	
61	4	Isaac Mansoor	India	1:10.8	

=== Semifinals ===
The 8 fastest swimmers advanced to the final.

Rank	Heat	Swimmer	Nation	Time	Notes
1	1	Clarke Scholes	United States	57.1	Q, OR
2	3	Ronald Gora	United States	57.7	Q
3	3	Rex Aubrey	Australia	57.8	Q
3	2	Géza Kádas	Hungary	57.8	Q
3	1	Göran Larsson	Sweden	57.8	Q
6	2	Hiroshi Suzuki	Japan	58.0	Q
7	1	Aldo Eminente	France	58.3	QSO
7	3	Toru Goto	Japan	58.3	QSO
7	1	Yoshihiro Hamaguchi	Japan	58.3	QSO
10	2	Dick Cleveland	United States	58.6	
11	2	Lev Balandin	Soviet Union	58.8	
12	3	Alex Jany	France	58.9	
12	1	Carlo Pedersoli	Italy	58.9	
14	3	Lucien Beaumont	Canada	59.3	
15	3	György Ipacs	Hungary	59.4	
15	1	Jack Wardrop	Great Britain	59.4	
17	3	Ronald Roberts	Great Britain	59.5	
18	1	Endel Edasi	Soviet Union	59.8	
18	2	Joris Tjebbes	Netherlands	59.8	
20	1	Nicasio Silverio	Cuba	59.9	
21	2	John Durr	South Africa	1:00.2	
22	2	Thomas Welsh	Great Britain	1:00.3	
23	2	Cheung Kin Man	Hong Kong	1:00.9	
24	3	Vladimir Skomarovsky	Soviet Union	1:01.1	

Swim-off

Because there were 3 swimmers with the same swim time, a tie-breaking heat was held. The two fastest swimmers advanced to the final.

Rank	Swimmer	Nation	Time	Notes
1	Toru Goto	Japan	58.5	Q
2	Aldo Eminente	France	58.8	Q
3	Yoshihiro Hamaguchi	Japan	59.1	

=== Final ===
Rank	Swimmer	Nation	Time	Notes
1st place, gold medalist(s)	Clarke Scholes	United States	57.4	
2nd place, silver medalist(s)	Hiroshi Suzuki	Japan	57.4	
3rd place, bronze medalist(s)	Göran Larsson	Sweden	58.2	
4	Toru Goto	Japan	58.5	
5	Géza Kádas	Hungary	58.6	
6	Rex Aubrey	Australia	58.7	
7	Aldo Eminente	France	58.7	
8	Ronald Gora	United States	58.8	
