= France at the 1951 Mediterranean Games =

- IOC code: FRA
- NOC: French National Olympic and Sports Committee

in Alexandria, Egypt
- Competitors: 42 in 6 sports
- Medals Ranked 2nd: Gold 26 Silver 13 Bronze 5 Total 44

Mediterranean Games appearances (overview)
- 1951; 1955; 1959; 1963; 1967; 1971; 1975; 1979; 1983; 1987; 1991; 1993; 1997; 2001; 2005; 2009; 2013; 2018; 2022; 2026

France competed at the 1951 Mediterranean Games in Alexandria, Egypt.

== Medals by sport ==
Sport	Gold	Silver	Bronze	Total
Athletics	9	4	0	13
Swimming	7	2	1	10
Gymnastics	5	2	0	7
Fencing	3	2	3	8
Weightlifting	1	2	1	4
Diving	1	1	0	2
Totals (6 entries)	26	13	5	44

== Medalists ==
Medal	Name(s)	Sport	Event
Gold	Jacques Degats	Athletics	400 m
Gold	Patrick El Mabrouk	Athletics	800 m
Gold	Patrick El Mabrouk	Athletics	1500 m
Gold	Alain Mimoun	Athletics	5000 m
Gold	Alain Mimoun	Athletics	10,000 m
Gold	Jean-François Brisson	Athletics	110 m hurdles
Gold	Georges Damitio	Athletics	High jump
Gold	Victor Sillon	Athletics	Pole vault
Gold	France national track team: Jacques Degats Jean-Paul Martin du Gard Michel Clare Patrick El Mabrouk	Athletics	4 x 400 metres relay
Gold	Christian d'Oriola	Fencing	Individual foil
Gold	Jacques Lefèvre	Fencing	Individual sabre
Gold	René Bougnol	Fencing	Individual épée
Gold	Raymond Badin, Raymond Dot, Georges Floquet, Michel Mathiot	Gymnastics	Team all-around
Gold	Raymond Dot	Gymnastics	Individual all-around
Gold	Raymond Dot	Gymnastics	Floor exercise
Gold	Raymond Dot	Gymnastics	Pommel horse
Gold	Raymond Dot	Gymnastics	Rings
Gold	Jean Debuf	Weightlifting	82.5 kg
Gold	Alexandre Jany	Swimming	100 m freestyle
Gold	Jean Boiteux	Swimming	400 m freestyle
Gold	Jean Boiteux	Swimming	1500 m freestyle
Gold	Gilbert Bozon	Swimming	100 m backstroke
Gold	Maurice Lusien	Swimming	200 m breastroke
Gold	France national swimming team: Joseph Bernardo Michel Vandamme Jean Boiteux Alexandre Jany	Swimming	4 × 200 m freestyle relay
Gold	France national swimming team: Gilbert Bozon Maurice Lusien Alexandre Jany	Swimming	3 x 100 m medley relay
Gold	Raymond Mulinghausen	Diving	10 m platform
Silver	Victor Sillon	Athletics	Triple jump
Silver	Papagallo Thiam	Athletics	High jump
Silver	Jacques Degats	Athletics	200 m
Silver	Michel Clare	Athletics	800 m
Silver	René Bougnol, Christian d'Oriola, Claude Netter, Jacques Noël, Adrien Rommel	Fencing	Team foil
Silver	René Bougnol, Jacques Coutrot, Armand Mouyal	Fencing	Team épée
Silver	Raymond Dot	Gymnastics	Parallel bars
Silver	Raymond Dot	Gymnastics	Horizontal bar
Silver	Marcel Thévenet	Weightlifting	56 kg
Silver	Max Heral	Weightlifting	60 kg
Silver	Joseph Bernardo	Swimming	400 m freestyle
Silver	Joseph Bernardo	Swimming	1500 m freestyle
Silver	Pierrot?	Diving	3 metre springboard
Bronze	Claude Netter	Fencing	Individual foil
Bronze	Jacques Lefèvre, Bernard Morel, Claude Netter	Fencing	Team sabre
Bronze	Jacques Coutrot	Fencing	Individual épée
Bronze	Georges Firmin	Weightlifting	75 kg
Bronze	Jean Boiteux	Swimming	100 m freestyle
