= Swimming at the 1952 Summer Olympics – Men's 4 × 200 metre freestyle relay =

Men's 4 × 200 metre freestyle relay at the Games of the XV Olympiad
- Venue: Helsinki Swimming Stadium
- Date: 28 July 1952 (heats); 29 July 1952 (final)
- Competitors: 74 from 17 nations
- Teams: 17
- Winning time: 8:31.1 OR

Medalists
1st place, gold medalist(s)		Wayne Moore; Bill Woolsey; Ford Konno; Jimmy McLane	United States
2nd place, silver medalist(s)		Hiroshi Suzuki; Yoshihiro Hamaguchi; Toru Goto; Teijiro Tanikawa	Japan
3rd place, bronze medalist(s)		Joseph Bernardo; Aldo Eminente; Alexandre Jany; Jean Boiteux	France

The men's 4 × 200 metre freestyle relay event at the 1952 Olympic Games took place from 28 to 29 July at the Swimming Stadium. The relay featured teams of four swimmers each swimming four lengths of the 50 m pool freestyle.

== Results ==
=== Heats ===
Heat One

Place	Swimmers	Time	Notes
1	Jo Bernardo, Aldo Eminente, Alex Jany, and Jean Boiteux (FRA)	8:55.9	
2	Roy Botham, Ronald Burns, Thomas Welsh, and Jack Wardrop (GBR)	8:59.7	
3	Rex Aubrey, Frank O'Neill, Garrick Agnew, and John Marshall (AUS)	9:01.4	
4	Viktor Drobinsky, Vasily Karmanov, Leonid Meshkov, and Lev Balandin (URS)	9:01.9	
5	Carlo Pedersoli, Egidio Massaria, Angelo Romani, and Giovanni Paliaga (ITA)	9:17.9	
6	Pentti Ikonen, Pentti Paatsalo, Mauno Valkeinen, and Leo Telivuo (FIN)	9:26.6	

Heat Two

Place	Swimmers	Time	Notes
1	Wally Wolf, Don Sheff, Frank Dooley and Bumpy Jones (USA)	8:50.9	
2	György Csordás, László Gyöngyösi, Gusztáv Kettesi and Imre Nyéki (HUN)	8:54.6	
3	Graham Johnston, Dennis Ford, John Durr and Peter Duncan (RSA)	8:58.7	
4	Haroldo Lara, Sylvio dos Santos, Aram Boghossian and João Gonçalves Filho (BRA)	9:09.0	
5	Kamiel Reynders, Joseph Anthoon, Marcel Anthoon and Alfons Bierebeek (BEL)	9:45.5	

Heat Three

Place	Swimmers	Time	Notes
1	Yoshihiro Hamaguchi, Hiroshi Suzuki, Toru Goto and Teijiro Tanikawa (JPN)	8:42.1	
2	Rolf Olander, Göran Larsson, Olle Johansson and Per-Olof Östrand (SWE)	8:52.3	
3	Federico Zwanck, Marcelo Trabucco, Pedro Galvão and Alfredo Yantorno (ARG)	8:59.3	
4	Gerry McNamee, Lucien Beaumont, Leo Portelance and Allen Gilchrist (CAN)	9:10.9	
5	Gotfryd Gremlowski, Antoni Tołkaczewski, Józef Lewicki and Jerzy Boniecki (POL)	9:13.7	
6	Alberto Isaac, Efrén Fierro, César Borja and Tonatiuh Gutiérrez (MEX)	9:15.7	

=== Final ===
Place	Swimmers	Time	Notes
1st place, gold medalist(s)	Wayne Moore, Bill Woolsey, Ford Konno and Jimmy McLane (USA)	8:31.1	WR
2nd place, silver medalist(s)	Hiroshi Suzuki, Yoshihiro Hamaguchi, Toru Goto, and Teijiro Tanikawa (JPN)	8:33.5	
3rd place, bronze medalist(s)	Jo Bernardo, Aldo Eminente, Alex Jany, and Jean Boiteux (FRA)	8:45.9	
4	Lars Svantesson, Göran Larsson, Per-Olof Östrand and Olle Johansson (SWE)	8:46.8	
5	László Gyöngyösi, György Csordás, Géza Kádas and Imre Nyéki (HUN)	8:52.6	
6	Roy Botham, Ronald Burns, Thomas Welsh, and Jack Wardrop (GBR)	8:52.9	
7	Graham Johnston, Dennis Ford, John Durr and Peter Duncan (RSA)	8:55.1	
8	Federico Zwanck, Marcelo Trabucco, Pedro Galvão and Alfredo Yantorno (ARG)	8:56.9	
