= Swimming at the 1955 Mediterranean Games =

- Location: Barcelona, Spain
- Dates: 15–25 July 1955

The swimming competition at the 1955 Mediterranean Games was held in Barcelona, Spain.

== Medallists ==
=== Men's events ===
Games	Gold		Silver		Bronze	
100 m freestyle	Aldo Eminente; France	59.7	Abdel Aziz El-Shafei; Egypt	60.2	Alfonso Buonocore; Italy	60.4
400 m freestyle	Jean Boiteux; France	4:42.2	Angelo Romani; Italy	4:42.4	Guy Montserret; France	4:49.5
1500 m freestyle	Jean Boiteux; France	19:14.1	Jacques Collignon; France	19:31.4	Guy Montserret; France	19:40.0
100 m backstroke	Gilbert Bozon; France	1:06.2	Gérard Coignot; France	1:09.5	Egidio Massaria; Italy	1:10.6
200 m breaststroke	Hugues Broussard; France	2:47.8	Jesús Domínguez; Spain	2:52.3	Roberto Lazzari; Italy	2:52.3
200 m butterfly	Maurice Lusien; France	2:41.7	Roberto Lazzari; Italy	2:44.3	Eduardo Ley; Spain	2:44.9
4 × 200 m freestyle relay	France	9:03.8	Italy	9:13.3	Spain	9:19.4
4 × 100 m medley relay	France	4:35.8	Italy	4:43.4	Spain	4:47.0

== Medal table ==
Rank	Nation	Gold	Silver	Bronze	Total
1	France	8	2	2	12
2	Italy	0	4	3	7
3	Spain	0	1	3	4
4	Egypt	0	1	0	1
Totals (4 entries)		8	8	8	24
