= Swimming at the 1952 Summer Olympics – Men's 400 metre freestyle =

Men's 400 metre freestyle at the Games of the XV Olympiad
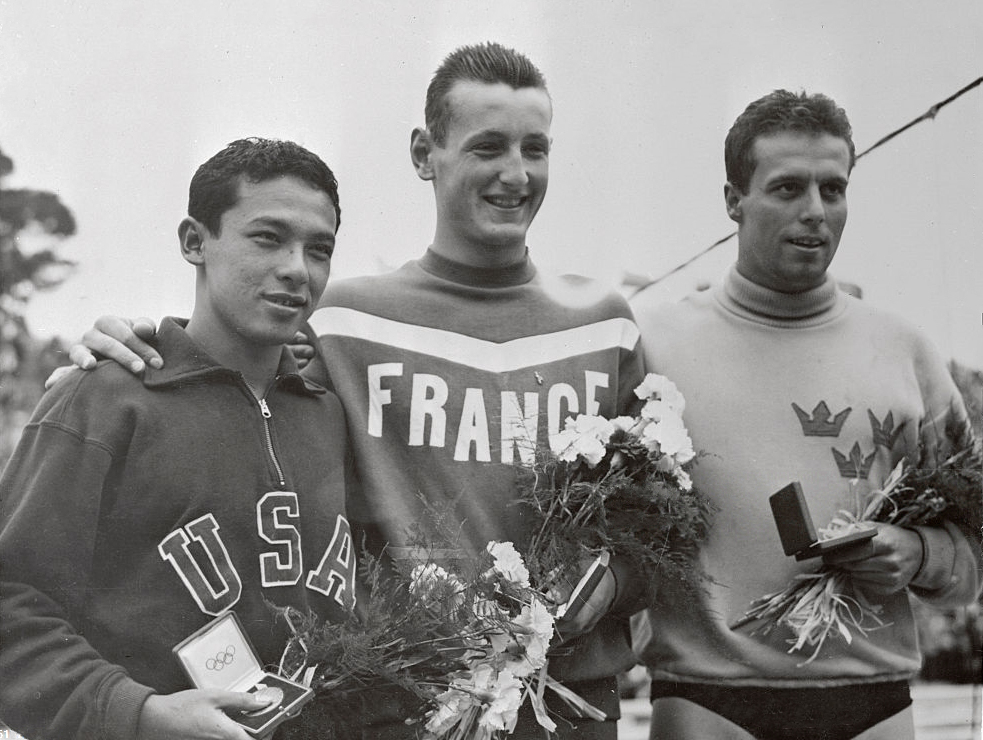
- Medal winners, from left-right: Ford Konno, Jean Boiteux, Per-Olof Östrand
- Venue: Helsinki Swimming Stadium
- Date: 28 July 1952 (heats); 29 July 1952 (semifinals); 30 July 1952 (final)
- Competitors: 51 from 29 nations
- Winning time: 4:30.7 OR

Medalists
1st place, gold medalist(s)		Jean Boiteux	France
2nd place, silver medalist(s)		Ford Konno	United States
3rd place, bronze medalist(s)		Per-Olof Östrand	Sweden

The men's 400 metre freestyle event at the 1952 Olympic Games took place between 28 and 30 July at the Swimming Stadium. This swimming event used freestyle swimming, which means that the method of the stroke is not regulated (unlike backstroke, breaststroke, and butterfly events). Nearly all swimmers use the front crawl or a variant of that stroke. Because an Olympic-size swimming pool is 50 metres long, this race consisted of eight lengths of the pool.

At the conclusion of the race, Boiteux's father jumped into the pool to congratulate his son.

== Results ==
=== Heats ===
Heat 1

Rank	Athlete	Country	Time	Note
1	Jack Wardrop	Great Britain	4:43.7	
2	Yasuo Tanaka	Japan	4:44.3	
3	Gotfryd Gremlowski	Poland	4:49.0	
4	Jo Bernardo	France	4:53.5	
5	Pentti Ikonen	Finland	4:55.7	
6	Geoffrey Marks	Ceylon	5:15.2	
7	Georg Mascetti	Saar	5:31.2	

Heat 2

Rank	Athlete	Country	Time	Note
1	Hironoshin Furuhashi	Japan	4:43.3	
2	Viktor Drobinsky	Soviet Union	4:56.5	
3	Neo Chwee Kok	Singapore	4:57.5	
4	Eduardo Priggione	Uruguay	5:12.1	
5	Walter Bardgett	Bermuda	5:18.0	
6	Sonny Monteiro	Hong Kong	5:21.6	

Heat 3

Rank	Athlete	Country	Time	Note
1	Jimmy McLane	United States	4:46.5	
2	Dennis Ford	South Africa	4:50.2	
3	Allen Gilchrist	Canada	4:52.5	
4	Enrique Granados	Spain	4:53.7	
5	Federico Zwanck	Argentina	4:56.4	
6	Ricardo Esperard	Brazil	5:09.5	
7	Walter Schneider	Switzerland	5:27.3	

Heat 4

Rank	Athlete	Country	Time	Note
1	Jean Boiteux	France	4:45.1	
2	Graham Johnston	South Africa	4:52.3	
3	Anatoly Raznochintsev	Soviet Union	4:56.8	
4	Peter Steinwender	Austria	5:03.6	
5	Peter Head	Great Britain	5:04.2	
6	Cheung Kin Man	Hong Kong	5:11.4	

Heat 5

Rank	Athlete	Country	Time	Note
1	György Csordás	Hungary	4:45.7	
2	Ford Konno	United States	4:47.9	
3	Joris Tjebbes	Netherlands	4:54.4	
4	Carlos Alberto Bonacich	Argentina	5:06.3	
5	Per Olsen	Norway	5:08.6	
6	Pentti Paatsalo	Finland	5:09.3	
7	Robert Cook	Bermuda	5:15.4	

Heat 6

Rank	Athlete	Country	Time	Note
1	Per-Olof Östrand	Sweden	4:38.6	
2	Gusztáv Kettesi	Hungary	4:53.0	
3	Garrick Agnew	Australia	4:55.5	
4	Roar Woldum	Norway	5:14.4	
5	Einari Aalto	Finland	5:15.8	

Heat 7

Rank	Athlete	Country	Time	Note
1	Tetsuo Okamoto	Brazil	4:46.1	
2	John Marshall	Australia	4:46.8	
3	Gerry McNamee	Canada	4:53.5	
4	Alfredo Yantorno	Argentina	4:54.5	
5	Ronald Burns	Great Britain	4:55.2	
6	Nguyễn Văn Phan	Vietnam	5:36.5	

Heat 8

Rank	Athlete	Country	Time	Note
1	Wayne Moore	United States	4:43.2	
2	Peter Duncan	South Africa	4:44.0	
3	Yoshio Tanaka	Japan	4:54.0	
4	Angelo Romani	Italy	5:05.1	
5	René Million	France	5:07.0	
6	Fernando Madeira	Portugal	5:08.6	
7	Muhammad Ramzan	Pakistan	5:45.7	

=== Final ===
Rank	Athlete	Country	Time	Notes
1	Jean Boiteux	France	4:30.7	OR
2	Ford Konno	United States	4:31.3	
3	Per-Olof Östrand	Sweden	4:35.2	
4	Peter Duncan	South Africa	4:37.9	
5	Jack Wardrop	Great Britain	4:39.9	
6	Wayne Moore	United States	4:40.1	
7	Jimmy McLane	United States	4:40.3	
8	Hironoshin Furuhashi	Japan	4:42.1	

Key: OR = Olympic record
