= Glorieux =

Glorieux is a surname. Notable people with the surname include:

- Achille Glorieux (1910–1999), French prelate, Vatican official and diplomat
- Alphonse Joseph Glorieux (1844–1917), Belgian missionary Roman Catholic bishop
- François Glorieux (1932–2023), Belgian conductor, pianist, composer, musicologist and teacher
- Gabriel Glorieux (1930–2007), Belgian cyclist
- Raphael Glorieux (1929–1986), Belgian cyclist

== See also ==
- French ship Glorieux (1756), a second-rate 74-gun ship-of-the-line in the French Navy, later commissioned in the Royal Navy as HMS Glorieux
- Le Glorieux (1984–2010), British-bred Thoroughbred racehorse
- French ship Le Glorieux, various ships of the name
- Les Corps glorieux, a large organ cycle composed in the summer of 1939
