= Van Houdt =

Van Houdt or Vanhoudt is a surname. Notable people with the surname include:

- Jan Van Houdt, Belgian engineer
- Peter Van Houdt (born 1976), Belgian footballer
- Pierre Van Houdt (born 1914), Belgian fencer
- Tom Vanhoudt (born 1972), Belgian tennis player
