= Reynders =

Reynders or Reijnders is a Dutch patronymic surname common in the Limburg area. The form Reinders is more common in the Eastern Netherlands and the flanking regions of Germany. The Dutch given name Reinder is a variation on Reinier (from Saint Rainier) or sometimes Reinhard. Notable people with the surname include:

Reynders

- Agnes Kay Eppers Reynders, Bolivian road cyclist
- Bennie Reynders (born 1962), South African sprint canoeist
- Didier Reynders (born 1958), Belgian politician
- Henri Reynders (1903–1981), Belgian Roman Catholic priest and humanitarian
- Herman Reynders (born 1958), Belgian basketball player and politician
- Jens Reynders, Belgian cyclist
- John Reynders (1888–1953), British musician and composer
- Joseph Reynders (born 1929), Belgian swimmer
- Kamiel Reynders (born 1931), Belgian swimmer
- Martin Reynders (born 1972), Dutch footballer and manager
- Yvonne Reynders (born 1937), Belgian cyclist

Reijnders

- Harry Reijnders (born 1954), Dutch architect
- Izaak Reijnders (1879–1966), Dutch Army general
- Peter Reijnders (1900–1974), Dutch photographer, film director and inventor
- Tijjani Reijnders (born 1998), Dutch footballer
- Eliano Reijnders (born 2001), Indonesian footballer

Reinders

- Elmar Reinders (born 1992), Dutch racing cyclist
- Geert Reinders (1737–1815), Dutch immunologist
- Joel Reinders (born 1987), Canadian football offensive tackle
- Kate Reinders (born 1980), American musical theatre actress
- Trevor Reinders (born 1963), Zimbabwean cricketer
- Uwe Reinders (born 1955), German football player and manager
