= Swimming at the 1951 Mediterranean Games =

- Location: Alexandria, Egypt
- Dates: 5–20 October 1951

The swimming competition at the 1951 Mediterranean Games was held in Alexandria, Egypt.

== Medallists ==
=== Men's events ===
Games	Gold		Silver		Bronze	
100 m freestyle	Alexandre Jany; France	58.9	Carlo Pedersoli; Italy	59.7	Jean Boiteux; France	60.0
400 m freestyle	Jean Boiteux; France	4:47.5	Joseph Bernardo; France	4:53.3	Enrique Granados; Spain	4:57.0
1500 m freestyle	Jean Boiteux; France	19:32.9	Joseph Bernardo; France	19:40.3	Enrique Granados; Spain	19:59.5
100 m backstroke	Gilbert Bozon; France	1:07.2	Egidio Massaria; Italy	1:11.3	Angelo Romani; Italy	1:12.0
200 m breaststroke	Maurice Lusien; France	2:41.9	Jesús Domínguez; Spain	2:43.7	Giorgio Grilz; Italy	2:48.0
4 × 200 m freestyle relay	France; Joseph Bernardo; Michel Vandamme; Jean Boiteux; Alexandre Jany	9:05.2	Spain; Roberto Queralt; Roberto Alberiche; Isidoro Ferry; Enrique Granados	9:16.3	Egypt	9:23.8
3 × 100 m medley relay	France; Gilbert Bozon; Maurice Lusien; Alexandre Jany	3:17.2	Italy; Egidio Massaria; Giorgio Grilz; Carlo Pedersoli	3:23.0	Spain; Antonio Quevedo; Jesús Domínguez; Ricardo Conde	3:23.9

== Medal table ==
Rank	Nation	Gold	Silver	Bronze	Total
1	France	7	2	1	10
2	Italy	0	3	2	5
3	Spain	0	2	3	5
4	Egypt	0	0	1	1
Totals (4 entries)		7	7	7	21
