= Udalov =

Udalov, feminine: Udalova is a Russian surname. Notable people with the surname include:

- Gennady Udalov (1931–1996), Russian diver
- Maxim Udalov (born 1966), Russian musician

== Fictional characters ==
- Korneliy Udalov from the fictional town of Veliky Guslyar
