= Bayot =

Bayot may refer to:

== People ==
- Robert Bayot
- Miguel Bayot
- Margaret-Ann Bayot
- Adolphe Jean-Baptiste Bayot

== Other uses ==
- Bayot language
- Bayot, a Cebuano word for effeminate men
