= Teijiro Tanikawa =

Japanese swimmer (1932–2025)

Personal information
- Born: 20 December 1932
- Died: 13 May 2025 (aged 92)
Medal record
Men's swimming
Representing Japan
Olympic Games
Silver medal – second place	1952 Helsinki	4x200 m freestyle
Asian Games
Gold medal – first place	1954 Manila	4x200m freestyle relay
Silver medal – second place	1954 Manila	100m freestyle

Teijiro Tanikawa (谷川 禎次郎, Tanikawa Teijirō; 20 December 1932 – 13 May 2025) was a Japanese freestyle swimmer. He competed in the 1952 Summer Olympics in Helsinki, Finland, and earned a silver medal in the 4 × 200 m freestyle relay team with teammates Toru Goto, Hiroshi Suzuki and Yoshihiro Hamaguchi. Tanikawa died on 13 May 2025, at the age of 92.

== Sources ==
- databaseOlympics
