= Martynchik =

Martynchik or Martinchik (Russian: Мартынчик) is a gender-neutral Slavic surname, a patronymic derivation from the name Martyn. Notable people with the surname include:

- Svetlana Martynchik (born 1965), Ukrainian fantasy writer
- Vadim Martinchik (born 1934), Soviet swimmer
