= Reinder =

Reinder (Dutch pronunciation: [ˈrɛindər]) and Reindert are Dutch masculine given names derived from Reinier and Reinhard, which are cognate with Rainier Rein.

People with the name include :

Reinder

- Reinder Boomsma (1879–1943), Dutch footballer
- Reinder Pieter van Calcar (1872–1957), Dutch bacteriologist and university president
- Reinder Dijkhuis (born 1971), Dutch comics artist
- Reinder Lubbers (born 1984), Dutch rower
- Reinder Nummerdor (born 1976), Dutch volleyball player
- Reinder van de Riet (1939–2008), Dutch computer scientist
- Reinder Strikwerda (1930–2006), Dutch orthopedic surgeon

Reindert

- Reindert Brasser (1912–1999), Dutch discus thrower
- Reindert de Favauge (1872–1949), Dutch sport shooter
- Reindert B.J. "Rein" de Waal (1904–1985), Dutch field hockey player
- Reindert Wepko van de Wint (1942–2006), Dutch painter, sculptor and architect

== See also ==
- Reinders, derived patronymic surname
- Reindeer
