= Vladimir Lavrinenko =

Soviet swimmer (1932–2004)

Personal information
- Born: 13 January 1932 Sukhumi, USSR
- Died: 7 January 2004 (aged 71) Moscow, Russia

Sport
- Sport: Swimming
- Club: Dynamo Moscow
Medal record
Representing the Soviet Union
European Championships
Bronze medal – third place	1954 Turin	1500 m freestyle

Vladimir Ivanovich Lavrinenko (Russian: Владимир Иванович Лавриненко; 13 January 1932 – 7 January 2004) was a Soviet swimmer who won a bronze medal in the 1500 m freestyle at the 1954 European Aquatics Championships. He competed in the same event at the 1952 Summer Olympics, but did not reach the final. He won five national titles in 1954, 1955, 1958, 1959 and 1961 and set five national records in the 800 m and 1500 m freestyle events.

He was born in Sukhumi, Abkhazia, but since 1955 lived in Moscow.
