= 1954 European Aquatics Championships =

Water sport competitions

8th European Aquatics Championships
- Host city: Turin
- Country: Italy
- Events: 18
- Opening: 31 August 1954
- Closing: 5 September 1954

The 1954 LEN European Aquatics Championships were held 31 August – 5 September in Turin, Italy. In swimming, butterfly events were contested for the first time; 100 m for women and 200 m for men.

== Medal table ==
* Host nation (Italy)

Rank	Nation	Gold	Silver	Bronze	Total
1	Hungary	9	6	3	18
2	Soviet Union	4	3	4	11
3	East Germany	2	0	0	2
4	Netherlands	1	2	1	4
5	France	1	1	1	3
6	West Germany	1	0	2	3
7	Sweden	0	2	1	3
8	Italy*	0	1	1	2
8	Yugoslavia	0	1	1	2
10	Denmark	0	1	0	1
10	Poland	0	1	0	1
12	Great Britain	0	0	3	3
13	Austria	0	0	1	1
Totals (13 entries)		18	18	18	54

== Medal summary ==
=== Diving ===
Men's events

Event	Gold		Silver		Bronze	
3 m springboard	Roman Brener; Soviet Union	153.26	Gennadiy Udalov; Soviet Union	141.16	Christian Pire; France	136.97
10 m platform	Roman Brener; Soviet Union	144.01	Mikhail Chachba; Soviet Union	142.06	Peter Heatly; Great Britain	133.59

Women's events

Event	Gold		Silver		Bronze	
3 m springboard	Valentina Chumicheva; Soviet Union	129.45	Birte Christoffersen-Hanson; Sweden	127.79	Lyubov Zhigalova; Soviet Union	125.30
10 m platform	Tatyana Karakashyants; Soviet Union	79.86	Birte Christoffersen-Hanson; Sweden	72.17	Eva Pfarrhofer; Austria	65.68

=== Swimming ===
Men's events

Event	Gold		Silver		Bronze	
100 m freestyle	Imre Nyéki; Hungary	57.8	Lev Balandin; Soviet Union	58.2	Géza Kádas; Hungary	58.3
400 m freestyle	György Csordás; Hungary	4:38.8	Angelo Romani; Italy	4:40.4	Per-Olof Östrand; Sweden	4:40.9
1500 m freestyle	György Csordás; Hungary	18:57.8	György Schuszter; Hungary	19:05.6	Vladimir Lavrinenko; Soviet Union	19:10.6
100 m backstroke	Gilbert Bozon; France	1:05.1	László Magyar; Hungary	1:05.3	John Brockway; Great Britain	1:05.9
200 m breaststroke	Klaus Bodinger; East Germany	2:40.9	Marek Petrusewicz; Poland	2:42.5	Sándor Utassy; Hungary	2:43.8
200 m butterfly	György Tumpek; Hungary	2:32.2	Zsolt Feyér; Hungary	2:35.1	Vadim Martinchik; Soviet Union	2:36.3
4 × 200 m freestyle relay	Hungary; Laszlo Till; Zoltán Dömötör; Géza Kádas; Imre Nyéki	8:47.8	France; Jean Boiteux; Gilbert Bozon; Guy Montserret; Aldo Eminente	8:54.1	Soviet Union; Nikolay Suhorukov; Vyacheslav Kurennoy; Yuriy Abovyan; Lev Balandin	8:55.9

Women's events

Event	Gold		Silver		Bronze	
100 m freestyle	Katalin Szőke; Hungary	1:05.8	Judit Temes; Hungary	1:06.7	Geertje Wielema; Netherlands	1:07.3
400 m freestyle	Agata Sebö; Hungary	5:14.4	Valéria Gyenge; Hungary	5:16.3	Eša Ligorio; Yugoslavia	5:18.7
100 m backstroke	Geertje Wielema; Netherlands	1:13.2	Joke de Korte; Netherlands	1:13.6	Pat Symons; Great Britain	1:17.3
200 m breaststroke	Ursula Happe; West Germany	2:54.9	Jytte Hansen; Denmark	2:55.0	Klara Killerman; Hungary	2:55.8
100 m butterfly	Jutta Langenau; East Germany	1:16.6	Maria Littomeritzky; Hungary	1:18.6	Ursula Happe; West Germany	1:18.9
4 × 100 m freestyle relay	Hungary; Valéria Gyenge; Agata Sebö; Judit Temes; Katalin Szőke	4:30.6	Netherlands; Loes Zandvliet; Joke de Korte; Hetty Balkenende; Geertje Wielema	4:33.2	West Germany; Käthe Jansen; Gisela von Netz; Birgit Klomp; Elisabeth Rechlin	4:37.2

=== Water polo ===
Event	Gold	Silver	Bronze
Men's tournament	Hungary	Yugoslavia	Italy

== See also ==
- List of European Championships records in swimming
