= Georg Mascetti =

German swimmer (1930–1982)

Personal information
- Nationality: German
- Born: 9 April 1930 Saarbrücken, Germany
- Died: 1 August 1982 (aged 52) Düsseldorf, Germany

Sport
- Sport: Swimming

Georg Mascetti (9 April 1930–1 August 1982) was a German swimmer. He competed in the men's 400-metre freestyle at the 1952 Summer Olympics representing Saar.
