= France at the 1971 Mediterranean Games =

- IOC code: FRA
- NOC: French Olympic Committee

in İzmir, Turkey
- Competitors: 45 men, 5 women
- Medals: Gold 7 Silver 9 Bronze 7 Total 23

Mediterranean Games appearances (overview)
- 1951; 1955; 1959; 1963; 1967; 1971; 1975; 1979; 1983; 1987; 1991; 1993; 1997; 2001; 2005; 2009; 2013; 2018; 2022; 2026

France competed at the 1971 Mediterranean Games in İzmir, Turkey.

== Medalists ==
=== By sport ===
Sport	Gold	Silver	Bronze	Total
Athletics	4	2	3	9
Boxing	0	0	2	2
Fencing	1	2	1	4
Weightlifting	1	2	1	4
Wrestling	1	3	0	4
Total	7	9	7	23

=== Gold ===
- Guy Drut (M) — Athletics, 100 metres hurdles
- Jean-Paul Villain (M) — Athletics, 3000 metres hurdles
- Jack Pani (M) — Athletics, Long jump
- Colette Besson (W) — Athletics, 400 metres
- Marie-Chantal Demaille (W) — Fencing, Individual foil
- Pierre Gourrier (M) — Weightlifting, Freestyle 90 kg
- Daniel Robin (M) — Wrestling, Greco-Roman 74 kg

=== Silver ===
- Nicole Pani (W) — Athletics, 100 metres
- Colette Besson, Michèle Beugnet, Nicole Pani, Odette Ducas (W) — Athletics, 4 × 100 metres relay
- Christian Noël (M) — Fencing, Individual foil
- Gérard Dellocque (M) — Fencing, Individual sabre
- Aimé Terme (M) — Weightlifting, 75 kg
- Jean Michon (M) — Weightlifting, +110 kg
- Théodule Toulotte (M) — Wrestling, Freestyle 62 kg
- Daniel Robin (M) — Wrestling, Freestyle 82 kg
- Théodule Toulotte (M) — Wrestling, Greco-Roman 62 kg

=== Bronze ===
- Yves Brouzet (M) — Athletics, Shot put
- Michèle Beugnet (W) — Athletics, 100 metres
- Colette Besson (W) — Athletics, 800 metres
- Domingo Onésime (M) — Boxing, 54 kg
- Jean-Pierre Younsi (M) — Boxing, 63.5 kg
- François Jeanne (M) — Fencing, Individual épée
- Guy Fougeret (M) — Weightlifting 56 kg
