= 1950 European Aquatics Championships =

Water sport competitions

7th European Aquatics Championships
- Host city: Vienna
- Country: Austria
- Events: 16
- Opening: 20 August 1950
- Closing: 27 August 1950

The 1950 LEN European Aquatics Championships were held 20–27 August 1950 in Vienna, Austria.

== Medal table ==
* Host nation (Austria)

Rank	Nation	Gold	Silver	Bronze	Total
1	France	4	6	2	12
2	Netherlands	4	4	3	11
3	West Germany	4	2	2	8
4	Sweden	2	2	2	6
5	Denmark	1	1	4	6
6	Belgium	1	0	0	1
7	Austria*	0	1	0	1
8	Yugoslavia	0	0	3	3
Totals (8 entries)		16	16	16	48

== Medal summary ==
=== Diving ===
Men's events

Event	Gold		Silver		Bronze	
3 m springboard	Hans Aderhold; West Germany	183.68	G Hernandez; France	174.66	Werner Sobek; West Germany	167.88
10 m platform	Günther Haase; West Germany	158.13	Werner Sobek; West Germany	141.54	Thomas Christiansen; Denmark	140.94

Women's events

Event	Gold		Silver		Bronze	
3 m springboard	Madeleine Moreau; France	155.58	Nicole Pellissard; France	140.64	Birte Christoffersen; Denmark	129.63
10 m platform	Nicole Pellissard; France	85.67	Alma Staudinger; Austria	82.38	Birte Christoffersen; Denmark	82.31

=== Swimming ===
Men's events

Event	Gold		Silver		Bronze	
100 m freestyle	Alexandre Jany; France	57.7	Göran Larsson; Sweden	59.4	Joris Tjebbes; Netherlands	1:00.3
400 m freestyle	Alexandre Jany; France	4:48.0	Jean Boiteux; France	4:50.1	Hans-Günther Lehmann; West Germany	4:51.2
1500 m freestyle	Hans-Günther Lehmann; West Germany	19:48.2	Jean Boiteux; France	19:48.4	Jo Bernardo; France	20:06.7
100 m backstroke	Göran Larsson; Sweden	1:09.4	Kees Kievit; Netherlands	1:09.7	Boris Škanata; Yugoslavia	1:10.8
200 m breaststroke	Herbert Klein; West Germany	2:38.6	Maurice Lusien; France	2:40.9	Bengt Rask; Sweden	2:43.8
4 × 200 m freestyle relay	Sweden; Tore Sjunnerholm; Per-Olof Östrand; Olle Johansson; Göran Larsson	9:06.5	France; Willy Blioch; Joseph Bernardo; Jean Boiteux; Alexandre Jany	9:10.0	Yugoslavia; Branko Vidović; Andrej Kvinc; Mislav Stipetić; Marijan Stipetić	9:12.7

Women's events

Event	Gold		Silver		Bronze	
100 m freestyle	Irma Heijting-Schuhmacher; Netherlands	1:06.4	Marie-Louise Linssen-Vaessen; Netherlands	1:07.1	Greta Andersen; Denmark	1:07.9
400 m freestyle	Greta Andersen; Denmark	5:30.9	Irma Heijting-Schuhmacher; Netherlands	5:31.2	Colette Thomas; France	5:37.4
100 m backstroke	Ria van der Horst; Netherlands	1:17.1	Gertrud Herrbruck; West Germany	1:17.8	Greetje Gaillard; Netherlands	1:17.9
200 m breaststroke	Raymonde Vergauwen; Belgium	3:00.1	Lies Bonnier; Netherlands	3:01.8	Jannie de Groot; Netherlands	3:02.2
4 × 100 m freestyle relay	Netherlands; Ans Massaar; Hannie Termeulen; Marie-Louise Linssen-Vaessen; Irma Heijting-Schuhmacher	4:33.9	Denmark; Greta Olsen; Ulla Madsen; Mette Petersen; Greta Andersen	4:43.1	Sweden; Marianne Lundqvist; Gisela Tidholm; Ingegard Fredin; Elisabeth Ahlgren	4:44.7

=== Water polo ===
Event	Gold	Silver	Bronze
Men's tournament	Netherlands	Sweden	Yugoslavia

== See also ==
- List of European Championships records in swimming
