= Juan Lanz =

Mexican swimmer

Personal information
- Born: 1 June 1932 (age 94)

Sport
- Sport: Swimming

Juan Lanz (born 1 June 1932) is a Mexican former swimmer. He competed in the men's 100 metre freestyle at the 1952 Summer Olympics.
