= Toru Goto =

Japanese swimmer

Personal information
- Born: 26 June 1934 (age 92) Fukuoka, Empire of Japan
Medal record
Men's swimming
Representing Japan
Olympic Games
Silver medal – second place	1952 Helsinki	4x200 m freestyle

Toru Goto (後藤 暢, Gotō Tōru; born June 26, 1934) is a former freestyle swimmer from Japan, who represented his native country at the 1952 Summer Olympics in Helsinki, Finland. There he won a silver medal as a member of the 4 × 200 m freestyle relay team, alongside Yoshihiro Hamaguchi, Hiroshi Suzuki and Teijiro Tanikawa.

Goto was born in Fukuoka.
