= Reindert =

Reindert (Dutch pronunciation: [ˈrɛindərt]) is a Frisian Dutch male given name, related to the German name Reinhard.

Notable people with this name include:

- Reindert Brasser (1912–1999), Dutch athlete
- Reindert de Favauge (1872–1949), Dutch sport shooter
- Reindert de Waal (1904–1985), Dutch field hockey player, better known as Rein de Waal

== See also ==
- Reinder, Dutch male given name
