= Thomas Christiansen (diver) =

Danish diver

Personal information
- Nationality: Danish
- Born: 5 January 1920 Copenhagen, Denmark
- Died: 12 March 1998 (aged 78) Mountlake Terrace, Washington, U.S.

Sport
- Sport: Diving
Medal record
Men's diving
Representing Denmark
European Championships
Gold medal – first place	1947 Monte Carlo	10 m platform
Bronze medal – third place	1950 Vienna	10 m platform

Thomas Christiansen (5 January 1920 – 12 March 1998) was a Danish diver. He competed at the 1948 Summer Olympics and the 1952 Summer Olympics.
