= Yasuo Tanaka (swimmer) =

Japanese swimmer

Personal information
- Born: 24 February 1932 (age 94)

Sport
- Sport: Swimming

Yasuo Tanaka (田中 寧夫, Tanaka Yasuo; born 24 February 1932) is a Japanese former swimmer. He competed in the men's 400 metre freestyle at the 1952 Summer Olympics.
