= Jutta Langenau =

East German swimmer

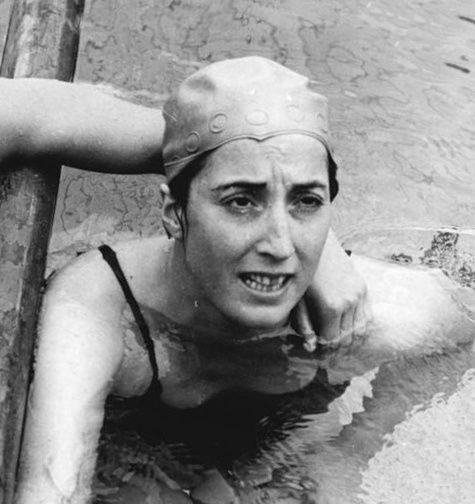
- Langenau in 1956

Personal information
- Born: 10 October 1933 Erfurt, Germany
- Died: 9 June 1982 (aged 48) Erfurt, East Germany

Sport
- Sport: Swimming
- Club: (...-1949) KWU Erfurt (1950-1954) SV Empor Erfurt (1954-...) SC Turbine Erfurt
- Coach: Johannes Horlbeck
Medal record
Women's swimming
Representing East Germany
European Championships
Gold medal – first place	1954 Turin	100 m butterfly

Jutta Langenau (née Großmann; 10 October 1933 – 9 June 1982) was a German swimmer who won a gold medal at the 1954 European Aquatics Championships, setting the first official world record in the 100 m butterfly at 1:16.6 minutes. She also competed at the 1956 Summer Olympics in same event and finished sixth.

From 1949 to 1959, she won 15 East German titles: 100 m backstroke in 1949, 100 m freestyle in 1951, 400 m freestyle in 1950, '51, '52, 1954, '55, '56, 1958 (silver in 1957, bronze in 1959), 1500 m freestyle in 1958 and 1959 (not organised before 1958), 100 butterfly in 1955, '56, 1958 and 1959.

In 1954 she was the first sportswoman elected into the Volkskammer (People's Chamber), the parliament of former GDR, representing the Free German Youth (FDJ).

Towards the end of her swimming career and after retiring from competitive swimming, from 1956 to 1978, she worked as an instructor at a sports school. After the birth of her third child she was a sports teacher in a polytechnic high school in Erfurt. Among her students was the Olympic swimmer Roland Matthes.
