= Ágota Sebő =

Hungarian swimmer

Personal information
- Full name: Sebő Ágota
- Nationality: Hungary
- Born: 7 May 1934 (age 92) Budapest

Sport
- Sport: Swimming
- Strokes: freestyle
- Club: Neményi MADISZ SE, BVSC
Medal record
European Championships (LC)
Gold medal – first place	1954 Turin	400 m freestyle
Gold medal – first place	1954 Turin	4×100 m freestyle

Ágota Sebő (born 7 May 1934 in Budapest) is a former freestyle swimmer from Hungary.

At the European Championships she won two gold medals in 1954. She retired from swimming in 1958 and later she was coach of the Hungarian modern pentathlon team.
