= Nahum Buch =

Israeli former Olympic swimmer (1932–2022)

Personal information
- Native name: נחום בוך
- Born: November 23, 1932 Kassel, Germany
- Died: November 7, 2022 (aged 89) Melbourne, Australia

Sport
- Sport: Swimming

Nahum David Norbert Buch (Hebrew: נחום בוך; 23 November 1932 – 7 November 2022) was an Israeli Olympic swimmer.

== Swimming career ==
Buch participated in swimming in the 1950 Maccabiah Games, where he shared the Best Athlete Award.

Buch competed for Israel at the 1952 Summer Olympics in Helsinki at the age of 19 in Swimming--Men's 100 metre Freestyle. He came in 7th in his heat in the first round, with a time of 1:05.6. Buch was the first swimmer to represent Israel at the Olympics.

Later in his life Buch coached the Israeli national swimming team for a number of years.

In 2019 he was recognized for his contribution to swimming by young Australian Jewish swimmers.
