= Heinz-Günther Lehmann =

German swimmer

Personal information
- Born: March 6, 1923 Zeitz, Germany
- Died: June 24, 2006 (aged 83) Göppingen, Germany

Sport
- Sport: Swimming
Medal record
Representing Germany
European Championships
Gold medal – first place	1950 Vienna	1500 m freestyle
Bronze medal – third place	1950 Vienna	400 m freestyle

Heinz-Günther Lehmann (6 March 1923 – 24 June 2006) was a German swimmer who competed in the 1952 Summer Olympics.
