= Hans Aderhold =

German diver

Personal information
- Nationality: German
- Born: 13 May 1919 Osnabrück, Germany
- Died: 4 August 1987 (aged 68) Dortmund, West Germany

Sport
- Sport: Diving
Medal record
Men's diving
Representing West Germany
European Championships
Gold medal – first place	1950 Vienna	3 m springboard

Hans Aderhold (13 May 1919 – 4 August 1987) was a German diver. He competed in the 1952 Summer Olympics.
