= Ronald Burns (swimmer) =

British swimmer (1933–1999)

Personal information
- Nationality: British
- Born: 10 April 1933
- Died: 29 May 1999 (aged 66)

Sport
- Sport: Swimming

Ronald Burns (10 April 1933 – 29 May 1999) was a British swimmer. He competed in the men's 400 metre freestyle and men's 4 × 200 metre freestyle relay events at the 1952 Summer Olympics.
