= Nikolay Suhorukov =

Soviet swimmer

Personal information
- Born: 1931 (age 94–95) Moscow, Russia

Sport
- Sport: Swimming
- Club: Navy Sport Club
Medal record
Representing Soviet Union
European Championships
Bronze medal – third place	1954 Turin	4×200 m freestyle

Nikolay Suhorukov (Russian: Николай Сухоруков; born 1931) is a retired Soviet swimmer who won a bronze medal in the 4×200 m freestyle relay at the 1954 European Aquatics Championships. The same year he won the national titles in the 400 m and 4×200 m freestyle events.
