= Brooba =

- Japanese theatrical release poster
- Directed by: Shigeyoshi Suzuki
- Written by: Hideo Oguni; Nobumasa Ikeda
- Produced by: Hidemasa Nagata
- Starring: Yoshihiro Hamaguchi; Yuko Yashio; Osamu Maruyama; Woody Strode
- Cinematography: Shigeo Itabashi; Michio Takahashi
- Music by: Akira Ifukube
- Production company: Daiei Film
- Distributed by: Daiei Film
- Release date: 25 October 1955
- Running time: 88 minutes
- Country: Japan
- Language: Japanese

Brooba (ブルーバ, Burūba) is a 1955 adventure film directed by Shigeyoshi Suzuki. The film was a Japanese Tarzan film based on the main character Brooba. It was supposed to be shot in the jungle but was filmed in Los Angeles. Like Johnny Weissmuller who starred in classic Tarzan films, the starring actor Yoshihiro Hamaguchi was also an Olympic swimming medalist in the 1952 Summer Olympics.

== Plot ==
Twenty years ago, Seiichiro Watanabe, his daughter Reiko, and Reiko's uncle Kenkichi went to Africa after asking their friend Dr. Shiga, who had disappeared after exploring Africa, and Tokio Shimamura, who has a local beast garden. Was welcomed. Seiichiro's actual purpose was to find a pile of diamonds in a letter he had previously received from Dr. Shiga. Tokio also knew the purpose, and the two decided to work together. The party traveling through the jungle was attacked by a group of human-eating aborigines and separated. Reiko saved a young man who was attacked by a gorilla on the way to escape and defeated the gorilla. The young man, called Bruva, was a wild child who did not know the human language and lived with animals in the jungle. While living with Bruva, Reiko realized that Bruva was the deceased child of Dr. Shiga. Bruva was a young man who did not know the dirt of the human world. The two became intimate, and Bruva gradually learned Japanese. However, when he came to look for Reiko, Bruva disappeared after being shot by a man's gun, and Reiko was taken back. Eventually, the party found a pile of diamonds, but at the same time they were attacked by a human-eating race. He was saved by Bruva who pulled a beast in a dangerous place. The party boarded the boat to bring Bruva back to Japan, but in the voice of the beasts who were reluctant to say goodbye, Bruva jumped into the river again and returned to the jungle. Reiko also followed him into the river.

== Cast ==
- Yoshihiro Hamaguchi as Takeji, Brooba
- Yuko Yashio as Reiko Watanabe
- Osamu Maruyama as Kenkichi Yamada
- Woody Strode as Native Chief
- Koji Minami as Tokio Shimamura
- Bontaro Miake as Father Seiichiro
- Frank Kumagaya as Father Daisuke

== Home media ==
- First: released on LD software in 1993 by Pioneer LDC as one of the "SFX Movie Treasured Series."
- Released on VHS software in 1999 as one of the "Daiei Video Museum" from Tokuma Japan Communications
- Latest: released in December 2015, DeAgostini Japan released a DVD (magazine) as "Daiei Special Effects Movie DVD Collection National Edition (34) 1/5/2016".
