= Yuriy Abovyan =

Soviet swimmer (born 1931)

Personal information
- Born: 1931 Tbilisi, Georgia

Sport
- Sport: Swimming
- Club: Dynamo Tbilisi
Medal record
Representing Soviet Union
European Championships
Bronze medal – third place	1954 Turin	4×200 m freestyle

Yuriy Abovyan (Russian: Юрий Абовян; 1931–unknown) was a Soviet swimmer who won a bronze medal in the 4 × 200 m freestyle relay at the 1954 European Aquatics Championships. Next year he won a national title in the 400 m freestyle event.
