= Guilherme Patroni =

Portuguese swimmer (1929–1958)

Personal information
- Full name: Guilherme José Patrone de Carvalho Duarte
- Born: 11 June 1929 Arrentela, Portugal
- Died: 6 February 1958 (aged 28) Odemira, Portugal

Sport
- Sport: Swimming

Guilherme Patroni (11 June 1929 – 6 February 1958) was a Portuguese swimmer. He competed in the men's 100 metre freestyle at the 1952 Summer Olympics.

Patroni died on 6 February 1958 at the age of 28 after crashing in an auto race.
