= Hernán Avilés =

Chilean swimmer (born 1929)

Carlos Hernán Avilés Morales
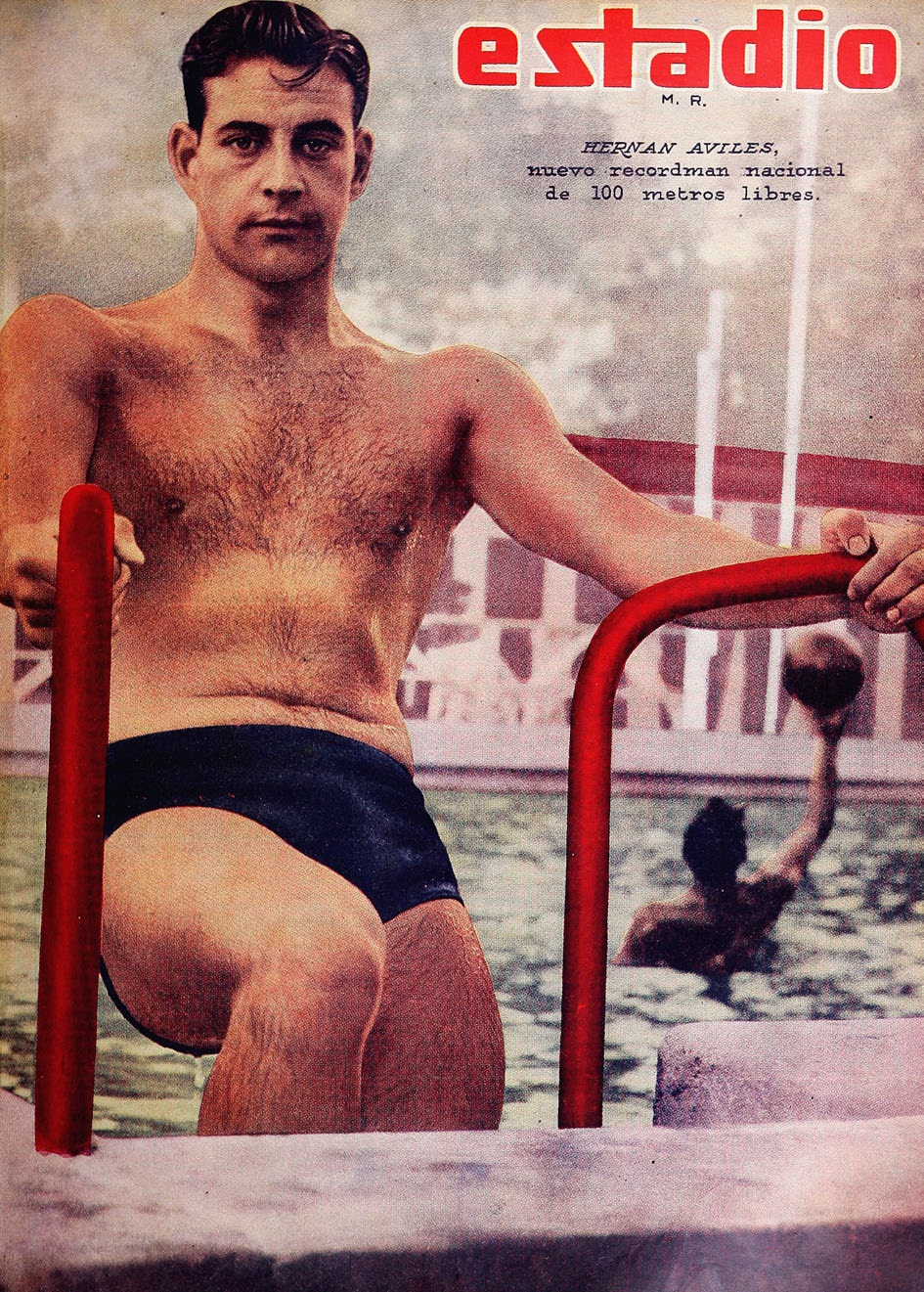

Personal information
- Born: 4 November 1929 (age 96) Traiguén, Chile

Sport
- Sport: Swimming

Hernán Avilés (born 4 November 1929) is a Chilean former swimmer. He competed in the men's 100 metre freestyle at the 1952 Summer Olympics.
