= Vladimir Skomarovsky =

Soviet swimmer

Personal information
- Born: 1932 (age 93–94)

Sport
- Sport: Swimming

Vladimir Skomarovsky (born 1932) is a Soviet former swimmer. He competed in the men's 100 metre freestyle at the 1952 Summer Olympics.
