= Rolf Olander =

Swedish swimmer

Personal information
- Full name: Rolf Gustav Olander
- Nationality: Swedish
- Born: 13 September 1934 Skellefteå, Sweden
- Died: 18 September 2023 (aged 89) Örebro, Sweden

Sport
- Sport: Swimming

Rolf Gustav Olander (13 September 1934 – 18 September 2023) was a Swedish swimmer. He competed in the men's 4 × 200 metre freestyle relay at the 1952 Summer Olympics.
