= Gérard Coignot =

French swimmer (1936–2023)

Personal information
- Full name: Gérard René Coignot
- Born: 25 November 1936 Troyes, France
- Died: 14 October 2023 (aged 86) Tours, France

Sport
- Sport: Swimming
Medal record
Representing France
Mediterranean Games
Silver medal – second place	1955 Barcelona	100m backstroke

Gérard Coignot (25 November 1936 – 14 October 2023) was a French swimmer. He competed in the men's 100 metre backstroke at the 1956 Summer Olympics. Coignot died on 14 October 2023, at the age of 86.
