= Einari Aalto =

Finnish swimmer

Personal information
- Born: 27 May 1926 Hamina, Finland
- Died: 16 September 1985 (aged 59) Turku, Finland

Sport
- Sport: Swimming

Einar Ferdinand "Einari" Aalto (27 May 1926 – 16 September 1985) was a Finnish swimmer. He competed in the men's 400 metre freestyle at the 1952 Summer Olympics.
