= Mikhail Chachba =

Russian diver

Personal information
- Born: 1930 Norilsk, Russian SFSR, Soviet Union
- Died: 1967 (aged 36–37) Moscow, Russian SFSR, Soviet Union

Sport
- Sport: Diving
Medal record
Men's diving
Representing the Soviet Union
European Championships
Silver medal – second place	1954 Turin	Platform
Silver medal – second place	1958 Budapest	Platform

Mikhail Chachba (Russian: Михаил Чачба, 1930 – 1967) was a Soviet diver. He competed in the 10 m platform at the 1952 and 1956 Summer Olympics and finished in 17th place and 8th place, respectively. He won silver medals in this discipline at the European championships in 1954 and 1958.
