= Werner Sobeck =

German diver

Personal information
- Nationality: German
- Born: 25 May 1922 Berlin, Germany
- Died: 24 July 2003 (aged 81) Berlin, Germany

Sport
- Sport: Diving
Medal record
Men's diving
Representing West Germany
European Championships
Silver medal – second place	1950 Vienna	10 m platform
Bronze medal – third place	1950 Vienna	3 m springboard

Werner Sobeck (25 May 1922 – 24 July 2003) was a German diver. He competed in two events at the 1952 Summer Olympics.
