= Roman Brener =

Soviet diver

Personal information
- Born: January 1, 1932 Zaporizhia, Ukrainian SSR, Soviet Union
- Died: 1991 (age 59)

Sport
- Sport: Diving
- Club: Trudovye Rezervy
Medal record
Representing the Soviet Union
European Championships
Gold medal – first place	1954 Turin	Platform
Gold medal – first place	1954 Turin	Springboard
Bronze medal – third place	1958 Budapest	Springboard

Roman Borysovych Brener (Russian: Роман Борисович Бренер; 1 January 1932 – 1991) was a Soviet and Ukrainian diver and pool player. He competed in the 3m springboard and 10m platform at the 1952 and 1956 Summer Olympics and finished in fifth-eight place in all competitions. He won both the springboard and platform at the 1954 European Aquatics Championships.

Nationally, he won eight titles in the springboard (1950–1954 and 1958–1960) and two in the platform (1951, 1962).
