= Vasily Karmanov =

Soviet swimmer

Personal information
- Born: 1927
- Died: 1967 (aged 39–40)

Sport
- Sport: Swimming

Vasily Karmanov (1927 – 1967) was a Soviet swimmer. He competed in the men's 4 × 200 metre freestyle relay at the 1952 Summer Olympics.
