= Peter Head (disambiguation) =

Peter Head is the stage name of Peter Beagley, an Australian rock musician, pianist, and singer-songwriter

Peter Head may also refer to:

- Peter Head (swimmer) (born 1935), American writer
- Peter Head (civil engineer) (born 1947), English civil and structural engineer
