= Leonid Meshkov =

Soviet swimmer (1916–1986)

Personal information
- Full name: Leonid Karpovich Meshkov
- Born: 14 January 1916 Tsaritsyn, Russian Empire
- Died: 4 March 1986 (aged 70) Moscow, RSFSR, Soviet Union

Sport
- Sport: Swimming

Leonid Karpovich Meshkov (Russian: Леонид Карпович Мешков; 14 January 1916 – 4 March 1986) was a Soviet swimmer and water polo player. He competed in the men's 4 × 200 metre freestyle relay at the 1952 Summer Olympics.
