= Birte Christoffersen =

Danish-Swedish diver (1924–2026)

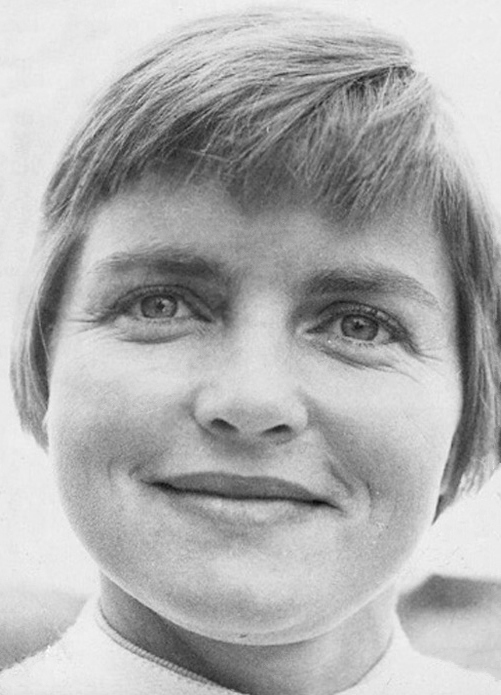
- Christoffersen circa 1960

Personal information
- Born: 28 March 1924 Copenhagen, Denmark
- Died: 23 February 2026 (aged 101) Limhamn, Sweden
- Height: 1.62 m (5 ft 4 in)
- Weight: 56 kg (123 lb)

Sport
- Sport: Diving
- Club: Kvindelig Idrætsforening, København; Stockholms KK; Malmö SS
Medal record
Representing Denmark
Olympic Games
Bronze medal – third place	1948 London	10 m platform
European Championships
Bronze medal – third place	1950 Vienna	10 m platform
Bronze medal – third place	1950 Vienna	3 m springboard
Representing Sweden
European Championships
Silver medal – second place	1954 Turin	10 m platform
Silver medal – second place	1954 Turin	3 m springboard
Bronze medal – third place	1958 Budapest	10 m platform

Birte Christoffersen (later Hanson, then Ekberg; 28 March 1924 – 23 February 2026) was a Danish-Swedish diver. She competed in the 3 m springboard and 10 m platform for Denmark at the 1948 Summer Olympics and for Sweden at the 1956 & 1960 Summer Olympics. She won a bronze medal in the platform in 1948 and finished in 8–12th place on other occasions. From December 2025 until her death, she was the oldest known living Olympic medalist.

At the European championships Christoffersen won bronze medals in both the platform and springboard in 1950, competing for Denmark. In 1953, she moved to Sweden, and next year won silver medals in both events. She earned one more bronze medal in 1958, in the platform.

Christoffersen turned 100 on 28 March 2024, and died on 23 February 2026, at the age of 101.
