= Iosif Novac =

Romanian swimmer

Personal information
- Born: 16 August 1922 Timișoara, Romania
- Died: 1995 (aged 72–73)

Sport
- Sport: Swimming

Iosif Novac (16 August 1922 – 1995) was a Romanian swimmer. He competed in the men's 100 metre freestyle at the 1952 Summer Olympics.
