= Joke de Korte =

Dutch swimmer (born 1935)

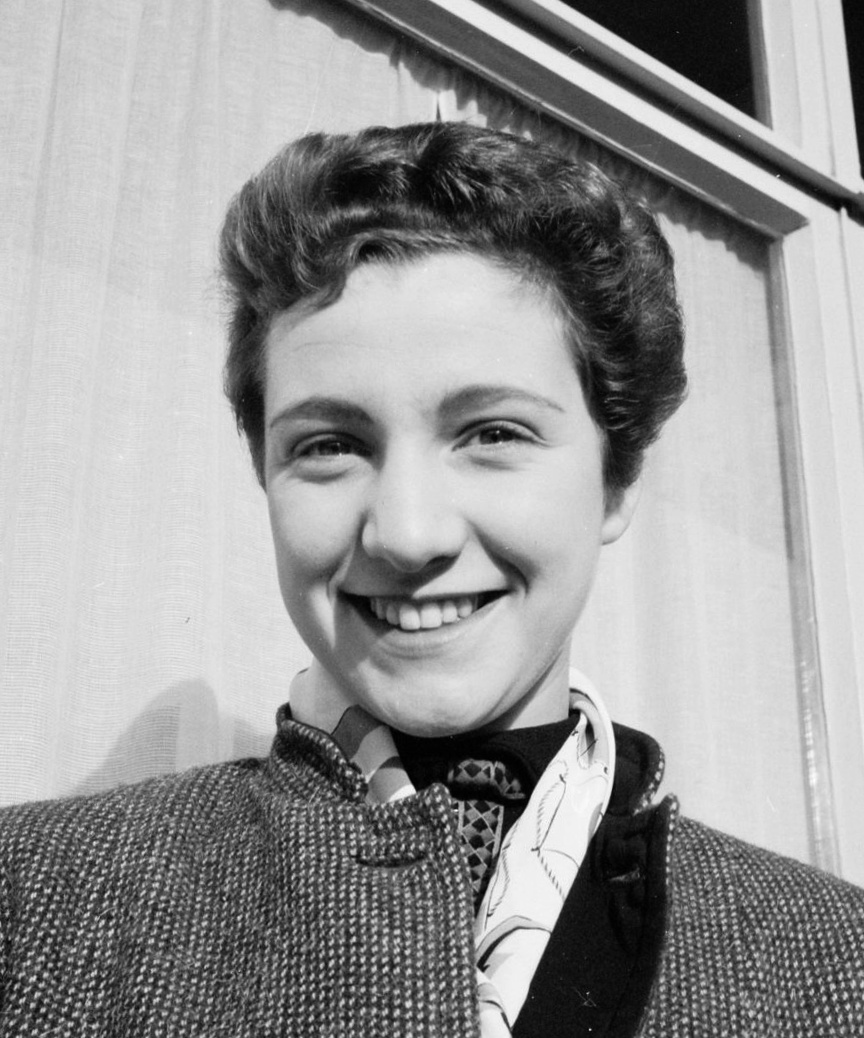
- Joke de Korte in 1955

Personal information
- Born: 18 August 1935 (age 91) Rotterdam, the Netherlands

Sport
- Sport: Swimming
- Club: ODZ, Rotterdam
Medal record
Representing the Netherlands
European Championships
Silver medal – second place	1954 Turin	100 m backstroke
Silver medal – second place	1954 Turin	4×100 m freestyle

Johanna Catharina "Joke" de Korte (born 18 August 1935) is a Dutch retired backstroke and freestyle swimmer. She finished fourth in 100m backstroke at the 1952 Summer Olympics, and won two silver medals at the 1954 European Aquatics Championships.
