= György Ipacs =

Hungarian swimmer

Personal information
- Nationality: Hungarian
- Born: 30 January 1933 Budapest, Hungary
- Died: 26 May 2006 (aged 73)

Sport
- Sport: Swimming

György Ipacs (30 January 1933 – 26 May 2006) was a Hungarian swimmer. He competed in the men's 100 metre freestyle at the 1952 Summer Olympics.
