= Peter Steinwender =

Austrian swimmer

Personal information
- Born: 2 November 1928
- Died: 19 November 2011 (aged 83)

Sport
- Sport: Swimming

Peter Steinwender (2 November 1928 – 19 November 2011) was an Austrian swimmer. He competed in the men's 400 metre freestyle at the 1952 Summer Olympics.
