= Józef Lewicki =

Polish swimmer (1934–2021)

Personal information
- Born: 15 March 1934 Lwów, Poland
- Died: 29 October 2021 (aged 87)

Sport
- Sport: Swimming

Józef Lewicki (15 March 1934 – 29 October 2021) was a Polish swimmer. He competed in the men's 4 × 200 metre freestyle relay at the 1952 Summer Olympics.
