= Endel Edasi =

Estonian swimmer

Personal information
- Born: 4 June 1929 Tallinn, Estonia
- Died: 4 April 2002 (aged 72)

Sport
- Sport: Swimming

Endel Edasi (4 June 1929 – 4 April 2002) was an Estonian swimmer who represented the Soviet Union in men's 100 metre freestyle swimming at the 1952 Summer Olympics.
