= Michel Currat =

Swiss swimmer

Personal information
- Nationality: Swiss
- Born: 1 December 1933 (age 92)

Sport
- Sport: Swimming

Michel Currat (born 1 December 1933) is a Swiss former freestyle swimmer. He competed in the men's 100 metre freestyle at the 1952 Summer Olympics.
