= Yoshihiro Hamaguchi =

Japanese swimmer (1926–2011)

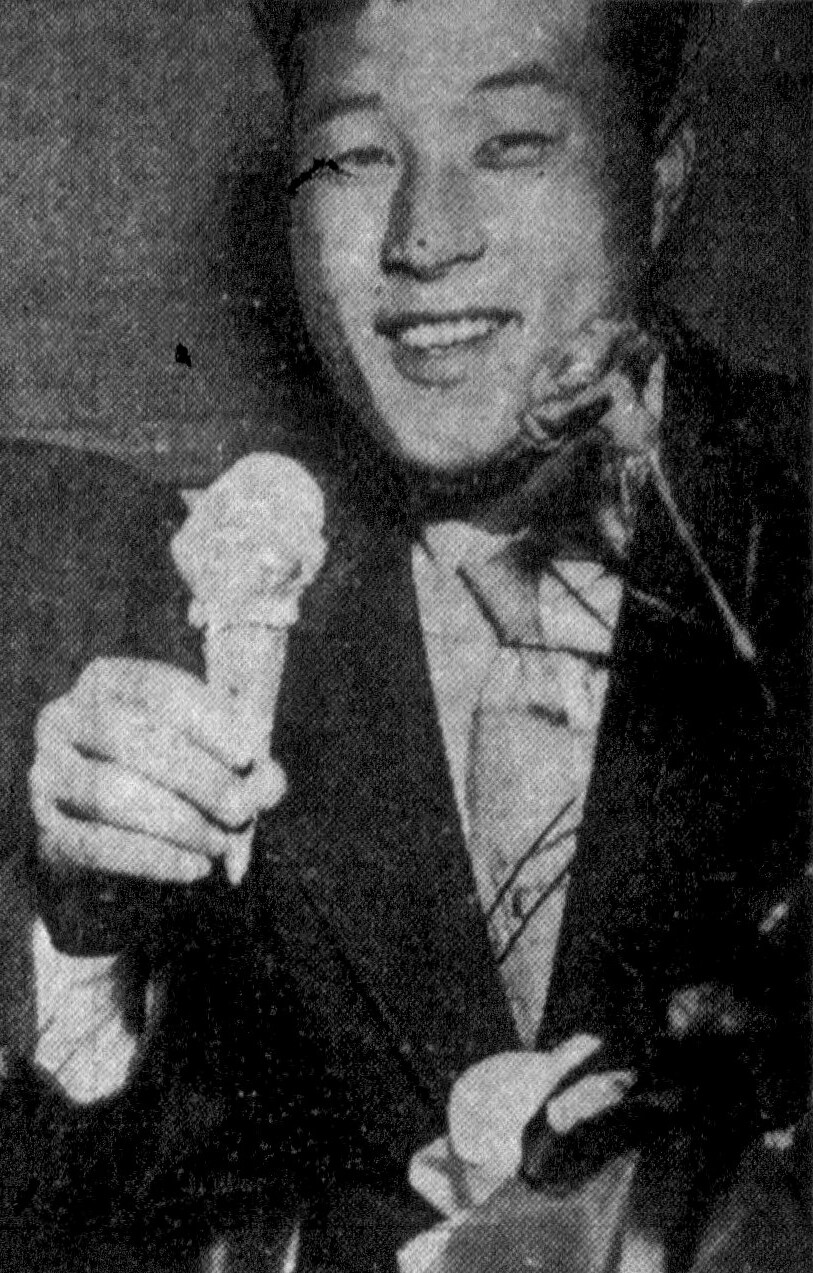
- Hamaguchi, circa 1949

Personal information
- Born: July 23, 1926 Kagawa, Empire of Japan
- Died: August 9, 2011 (aged 85)
Medal record
Men's swimming
Representing Japan
Olympic Games
Silver medal – second place	1952 Helsinki	4x200 m freestyle

Yoshihiro Hamaguchi (浜口 喜博, Hamaguchi Yoshihiro; June 23, 1926 – August 9, 2011) was a Japanese freestyle swimmer.

He represented Japan at the 1952 Summer Olympics in Helsinki, Finland. There, he won a silver medal as a member of the 4 × 200 m freestyle relay team, alongside Toru Goto, Hiroshi Suzuki and Teijiro Tanikawa. Also competed in the 100m freestyle advancing to the semifinals, missing the finals by a narrow margin.

After retiring he debuted as an actor in the 1955 film Buruuba as a Japanese version of Tarzan. He also appeared in the TV Show Shōnen Jet, a detective adventure show made by Kadokawa Pictures.
