= René Million =

French swimmer (1934–2013)

Personal information
- Born: 23 March 1934
- Died: 14 December 2013 (aged 79)

Sport
- Sport: Swimming

René Million (23 March 1934 – 14 December 2013) was a French swimmer. He competed in the men's 400 metre freestyle at the 1952 Summer Olympics.
