= Aldo Eminente =

French swimmer (1931–2021)

Personal information
- Born: 19 August 1931 Hanoi, French Indochina
- Died: 25 August 2021 (aged 90) Boulogne-Billancourt, France

Sport
- Sport: Swimming
Medal record
Representing France
Olympic Games
Bronze medal – third place	1952 Helsinki	4x200 m freestyle
European Championships
Silver medal – second place	1954 Turin	4×200 m freestyle
Mediterranean Games
Gold medal – first place	1955 Barcelona	100m freestyle
Gold medal – first place	1955 Barcelona	4x200m freestyle relay
Gold medal – first place	1955 Barcelona	4x100m medley relay

Aldo Eminente (19 August 1931 – 25 August 2021) was a French freestyle swimmer and Olympic medalist. He was born in Hanoi, French Indochina. He competed at the 1952 Olympic Games in Helsinki, where he received a bronze medal in the 4 x 200 m freestyle relay with the French swimming team (with Jean Boiteux, Joseph Bernardo, and Alexandre Jany).
