= Antoni Tołkaczewski =

Polish swimmer (1933–2021)

Personal information
- Nationality: Polish
- Born: 19 December 1933 Warsaw, Poland
- Died: 7 September 2021 (aged 87)

Sport
- Sport: Swimming

Antoni Tołkaczewski (19 December 1933 – 7 September 2021) was a Polish former swimmer. He competed in the men's 4 × 200 metre freestyle relay at the 1952 Summer Olympics.
