= Marek Petrusewicz =

Polish swimmer

Personal information
- Born: 22 February 1934 Wilno, Second Polish Republic
- Died: 3 October 1992 (aged 58) Wrocław, Poland

Sport
- Sport: Swimming
- Club: Stali Wrocław
Medal record
Men's swimming
Representing Poland
European Championships
Silver medal – second place	1954 Turin	200 m breaststroke

Marek Petrusewicz (22 February 1934 – 3 October 1992) was a Polish swimmer who won a silver medal in the 200 m breaststroke at the 1954 European Aquatics Championships. He competed in the same event at the 1952 Summer Olympics but did not reach the finals. Between 1953 and 1954 he set two world records in the 100 m breaststroke.

Buerger's disease resulted in amputation of his both legs, one in 1967 and the other in 1983. Nevertheless, he continued competing among disabled athletes in the 1960s, and was active in sport and political life of Poland until the second amputation and a stroke that he suffered in 1986.

== Biography ==
Petrusewicz was born in Wilno, Second Polish Republic (now Vilnius, Lithuania). After World War II, his family was forced to flee to Poland. He learned to swim at age 5 and started training in a club in 1947. He quickly became a top breaststroke swimmer, fully utilizing the then allowed technique of long underwater gliding without resurfacing. However, at the 1952 Summer Olympics he failed even to reach the finals. Later, in December 1952 he had a severe knee injury due to a skiing accident. He returned to swimming only by July 1953, but already in October set a new world record in the 100 m breaststroke in Wrocław. It was broken in February 1954 by Vladimir Minashkin, but by May 1954 Petrusewicz broke it again.

Petrusewicz was known for unstable character, and around 1955 lost his past motivation for swimming. As a result, he did not qualify for the 1956 Olympics. Also, his favorite underwater swimming technique was restricted by the International Swimming Federation in 1957.

In 1958, at international competitions at Rostock, Petrusewicz was found guilty of rape in a murky case and disqualified for life from international competitions. By that time, he was married to Halina Dzikówna and had a daughter, and had to start working at shipyards to earn for living. The marriage broke up in 1961. Around that time, he was diagnosed with the Buerger's disease that manifested itself as severe inflammation in a leg. The inevitable prospects of amputation resulted in alcoholism, which could not be helped by his elder brother Stanisław and rehabilitation clinics.

After the leg amputation in 1967, Petrusewicz gradually recovered, both mentally and physically. In 1969, he won a national title in the 50 m crawl among disabled athletes, setting a national record. In the late 1960s he also worked for the regional sport federation, organizing training camps and competitions. A movie (Rekord świata – World record) was filmed by Filip Bajon based on his swimming career. He received a master's degree with a thesis on the Movement and the ideology of fascism in Italy and Germany (Polish: Ruch i ideologia faszystowska we Włoszech i Niemczech). In 1975, he married again, to the singer Joanna Rawik whom he knew from school years; however, this marriage lasted only a few months.

In the early 1980s, Petrusewicz married again, to a school teacher; he also threw himself into politics. During a demonstration in December 1981 he was beaten by the police and spent two weeks in an unheated jail cell. This contributed to the second attack of the Buerger's disease that resulted in the amputation of his remaining leg in 1983. By the end of 1986, he had a stroke and almost lost his voice. He died in 1992.
