= Geertje Wielema =

Dutch swimmer (1934–2009)

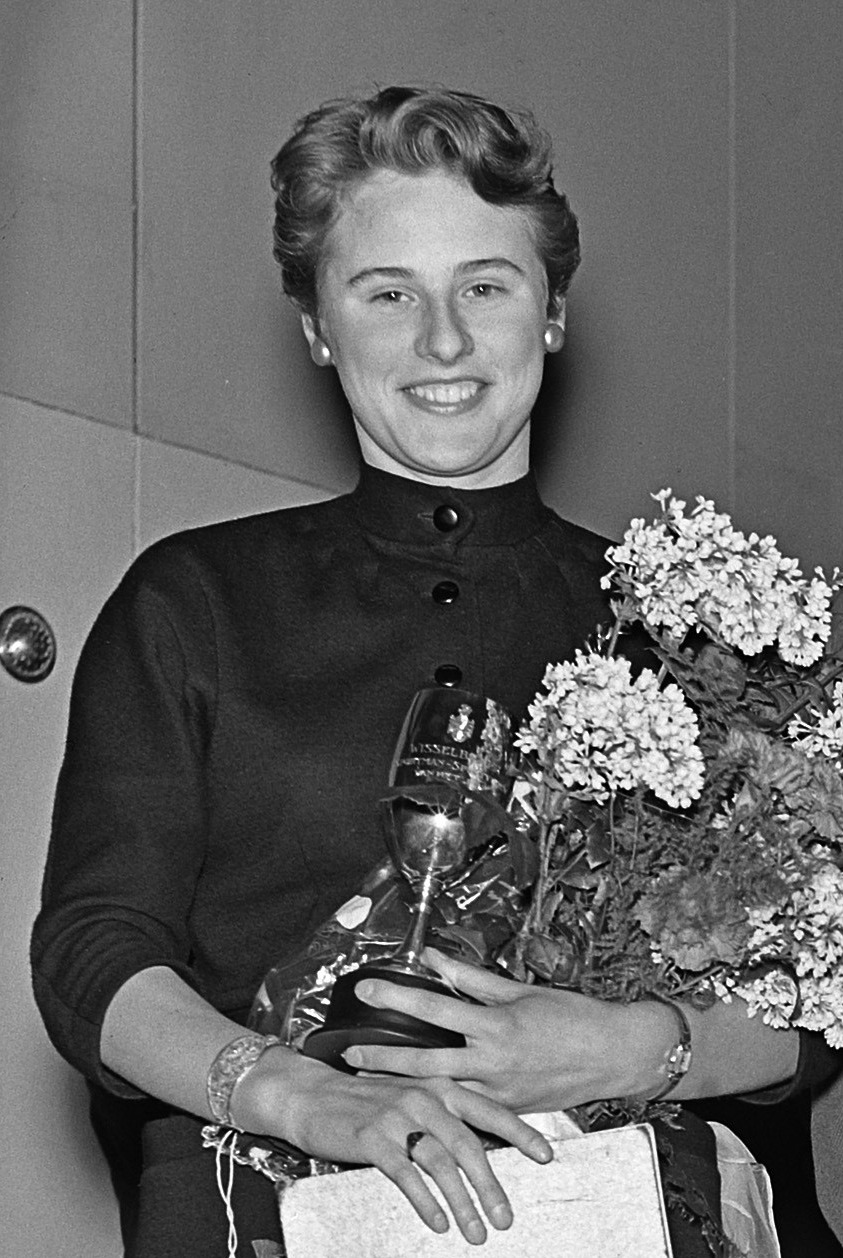
- Wielema in 1955

Personal information
- Born: 24 July 1934 Hilversum, Netherlands
- Died: 18 August 2009 (aged 75) Almere, Netherlands

Sport
- Sport: Swimming
- Club: De Robben, Hilversum
Medal record
Representing Netherlands
Olympic Games
Silver medal – second place	1952 Helsinki	100 m backstroke
European Championships
Gold medal – first place	1954 Turin	100 m backstroke
Silver medal – second place	1954 Turin	4×100 m freestyle
Bronze medal – third place	1954 Turin	100 m freestyle

Geertje Wielema (24 July 1934 – 18 August 2009) was a freestyle and backstroke swimmer from the Netherlands, who won the silver medal at the 1952 Summer Olympics in the 100 m backstroke. In 1954 she won three medals at European championships and was named Holland's first female Sportspersonality of the Year. She missed the 1956 Olympics in Melbourne due to their boycott by the Netherlands, but continued swimming until late 1950s and later served as a swimming judge. Between 1950 and 1954 she set five world records in medley relay and individual backstroke events.

Awards
Preceded by Arie van Vliet	Dutch Sportspersonality of the Year; 1954	Succeeded by Mary Kok
