= Yoshio Tanaka (swimmer) =

Japanese swimmer

Personal information
- Nationality: Japanese
- Born: 5 May 1930

Sport
- Sport: Swimming

Yoshio Tanaka (田中 純夫, Tanaka Yoshio; born 5 May 1930) is a Japanese former swimmer. He competed in the men's 400 metre freestyle at the 1952 Summer Olympics.
