= Anatoly Raznochintsev =

Soviet swimmer

Personal information
- Born: 22 November 1927 Armavir, Soviet Union
- Died: 19 July 1994 (aged 66)

Sport
- Sport: Swimming

Anatoly Raznochintsev (22 November 1927 – 19 July 1994) was a Soviet swimmer. He competed in the men's 400 metre freestyle at the 1952 Summer Olympics.
