= René Muñiz =

Mexican swimmer

Personal information
- Born: 23 October 1932
- Died: 12 May 2008 (aged 75)

Sport
- Sport: Swimming

René Muñiz (23 October 1932 – 12 May 2008) was a Mexican swimmer. He competed in the men's 100 metre freestyle at the 1952 Summer Olympics.
