= Giorgio Grilz =

Italian swimmer (1930–2018)

Personal information
- Born: 30 July 1930 Trieste, Italy
- Died: 3 December 2018 (aged 88) Turin, Italy

Sport
- Sport: Swimming
Medal record
Representing Italy
Mediterranean Games
Silver medal – second place	1951 Alexandria	3x100m medley relay
Bronze medal – third place	1951 Alexandria	200m breaststroke

Giorgio Grilz (30 July 1930 – 3 December 2018) was an Italian swimmer. He competed in the men's 200 metre breaststroke at the 1952 Summer Olympics.
