= Hugues Broussard =

French swimmer (1934–2019)

Personal information
- Born: March 4, 1934
- Died: February 18, 2019 (aged 84)

Sport
- Sport: Swimming
Medal record
Representing France
Mediterranean Games
Gold medal – first place	1955 Barcelona	200m breaststroke
Gold medal – first place	1955 Barcelona	4x100m medley relay

Hugues Broussard (4 March 1934 – 18 February 2019) was a French breaststroke swimmer who competed in the 1956 Summer Olympics.
