= Jesús Domínguez =

Spanish swimmer (1926–2003)

Personal information
- Born: 27 January 1926 Los Cristianos, Spain
- Died: 24 March 2003 (aged 77)

Sport
- Sport: Swimming
Medal record
Representing Spain
Mediterranean Games
Silver medal – second place	1951 Alexandria	200m breaststroke
Silver medal – second place	1955 Barcelona	200m breaststroke
Bronze medal – third place	1951 Alexandria	3x100m medley relay

Jesús Domínguez (27 January 1926 – 24 March 2003) was a Spanish freestyle swimmer. He competed in three events at the 1948 Summer Olympics.
