= Vadim Martinchik =

Soviet swimmer (born 1934)

Personal information
- Born: 1934 Lviv, Ukraine

Sport
- Sport: Swimming
- Club: Spartak
Medal record
Representing Soviet Union
European Championships
Bronze medal – third place	1954 Turin	200 m butterfly

Vadim Martinchik (Russian: Вадим Мартынчик; born 1934) was a Soviet swimmer who won a bronze medal in the 200 m butterfly at the 1954 European Aquatics Championships. During his career he set five national records in this event. After retirement he worked as a sport official in Lviv Oblast.
