= Marcel Anthoon =

Belgian swimmer

Personal information
- Born: 20 October 1933 (age 92) Antwerp, Belgium

Sport
- Sport: Swimming

Marcel Anthoon (born 20 October 1933) is a Belgian former swimmer. He competed in the men's 4 × 200 metre freestyle relay at the 1952 Summer Olympics.
