= Albert Bernard =

Belgian fencer

Personal information
- Full name: Albert Paul Joseph Ghislain Bernard
- Born: 16 March 1917
- Died: 3 September 1994 (aged 77)

Sport
- Sport: Fencing

Achievements and titles
- Olympic finals: 1952 Summer Olympics

Albert Bernard (16 March 1917 – 3 September 1994) was a Belgian fencer. He competed in the team épée event at the 1952 Summer Olympics.
