= Jan Van Houdt =

Jan Van Houdt from the IMEC, Leuven, Belgium was named Fellow of the Institute of Electrical and Electronics Engineers (IEEE) in 2014 for contributions to flash memory devices.
