= Francis Plumerel =

Belgian modern pentathlete

Personal information
- Full name: Francis Desiré Marie Ghislain Plumerel
- Born: 18 November 1917
- Died: 13 October 1985 (aged 67)

Sport
- Sport: Modern pentathlon

Francis Plumerel (18 November 1917 – 13 October 1985) was a Belgian modern pentathlete. He competed at the 1952 Summer Olympics.
