= Roberto Queralt =

Spanish swimmer (1931–1997)

Personal information
- Nationality: Spanish
- Born: 2 January 1931 Barcelona, Spain
- Died: 26 January 1997 (aged 66) Barcelona, Spain

Sport
- Sport: Swimming
Medal record
Representing Spain
Mediterranean Games
Silver medal – second place	1951 Alexandria	4x200m freestyle relay

Roberto Queralt (2 January 1931 – 26 January 1997) was a Spanish swimmer. He competed in the men's 100 metre freestyle and the water polo tournament at the 1952 Summer Olympics.
