= Joseph Anthoon =

Belgian swimmer

Personal information
- Born: 11 August 1930 Borgerhout, Belgium

Sport
- Sport: Swimming

Joseph Anthoon (born 11 August 1930) is a Belgian former swimmer. He competed in the men's 4 × 200 metre freestyle relay at the 1952 Summer Olympics.
