= Per-Olof Östrand =

Swedish swimmer

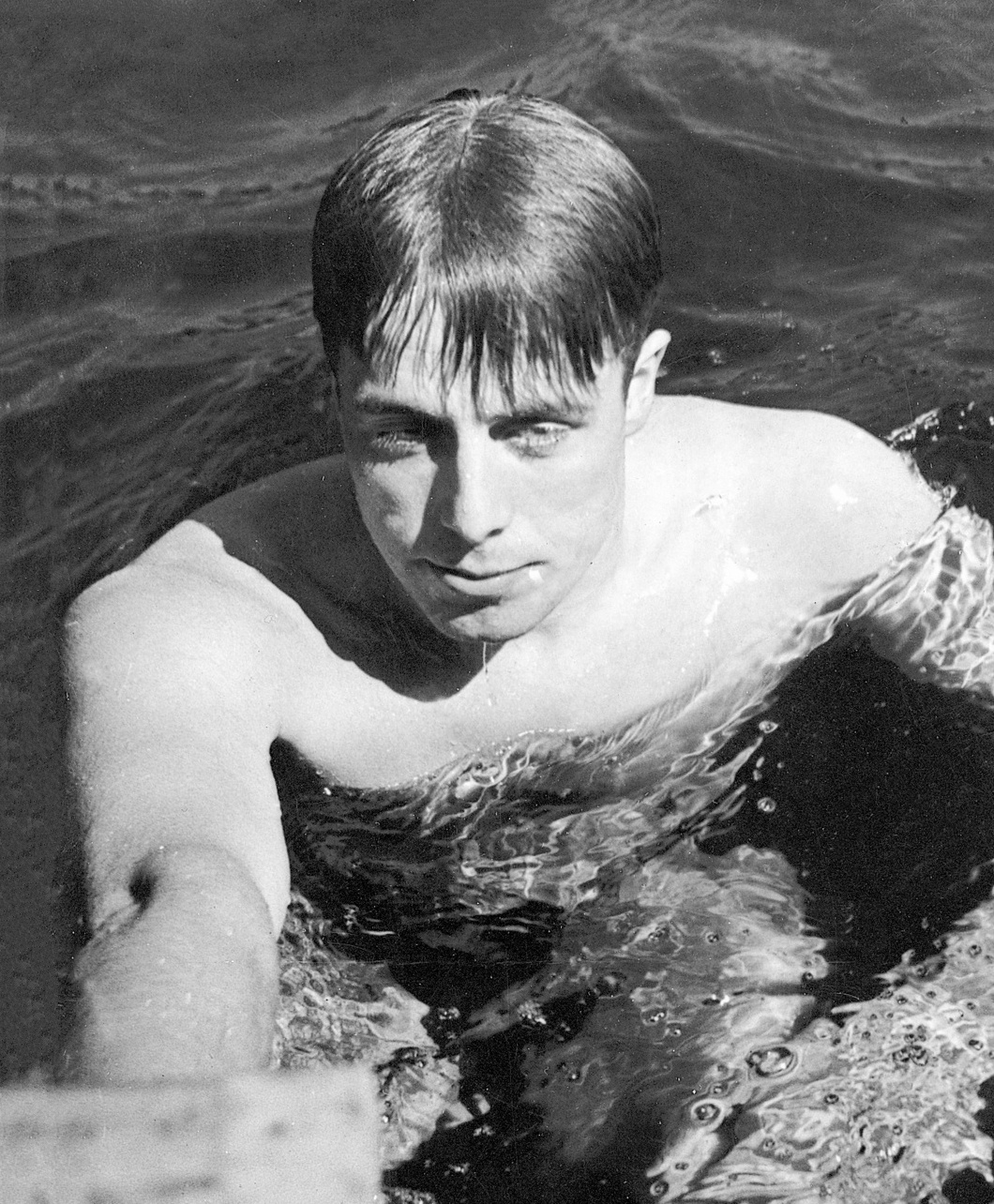

Personal information
- Born: 13 June 1930 Hofors, Sweden
- Died: 26 October 1980 (aged 50) Skärholmen, Sweden

Sport
- Sport: Swimming
- Club: Hofors AIF; IF Elfsborg, Borås
Medal record
Representing Sweden
Summer Olympics
Bronze medal – third place	1952 Helsinki	400 m freestyle
European Championships
Gold medal – first place	1947 Monte Carlo	4×200 m freestyle
Gold medal – first place	1950 Vienna	4×200 m freestyle
Bronze medal – third place	1954 Turin	400 m freestyle

Per-Olof Östrand (13 June 1930 – 26 October 1980) was a Swedish freestyle swimmer. He competed at the 1948, 1952 and 1956 Olympics in six 200–1500 m freestyle events in total, and won a bronze medal in the 400 m freestyle in 1952. His 4 × 200 m relay teams finished in fourth place in 1948 and 1952; they won gold medals at the European championships in 1947 and 1954.

Nationally Östrand won 15 swimming titles between 1947 and 1955, and competed in water polo for his club Hofors AIF. He won the 1949 British 'Open' ASA National Championship 220 yards freestyle title and he won the 1949 ASA National Championship 440 yards freestyle title.
