= Gennady Udalov =

Russian diver

Personal information
- Born: 1931
- Died: 1996 (aged 64–65)

Sport
- Sport: Diving
Medal record
Men's diving
Representing the Soviet Union
European Championships
Silver medal – second place	1954 Turin	Springboard

Gennady Udalov (Russian: Геннадий Удалов; 1931–1996) was a diver from Russia. He competed in the 3 m springboard at the 1952 and 1956 Summer Olympics and finished in 13th place and 5th place, respectively. He won a silver medal in this discipline at the 1954 European Aquatics Championships.
