= Abdel Aziz El-Shafei =

Egyptian swimmer (born 1931)

Personal information
- Born: 8 December 1931 (age 94) Cairo, Egypt

Sport
- Sport: Swimming
Medal record
Representing Egypt
Mediterranean Games
| Silver medal – second place | 1955 Barcelona | 100m freestyle |

Abdel Aziz El-Shafei (born 8 December 1931) is an Egyptian former swimmer. He competed in the men's 100 metre freestyle at the 1952 Summer Olympics He also competed in the water polo tournaments at the 1952 and 1960 Summer Olympics.
