= Olle Johansson (swimmer) =

Swedish swimmer (1927–1994)

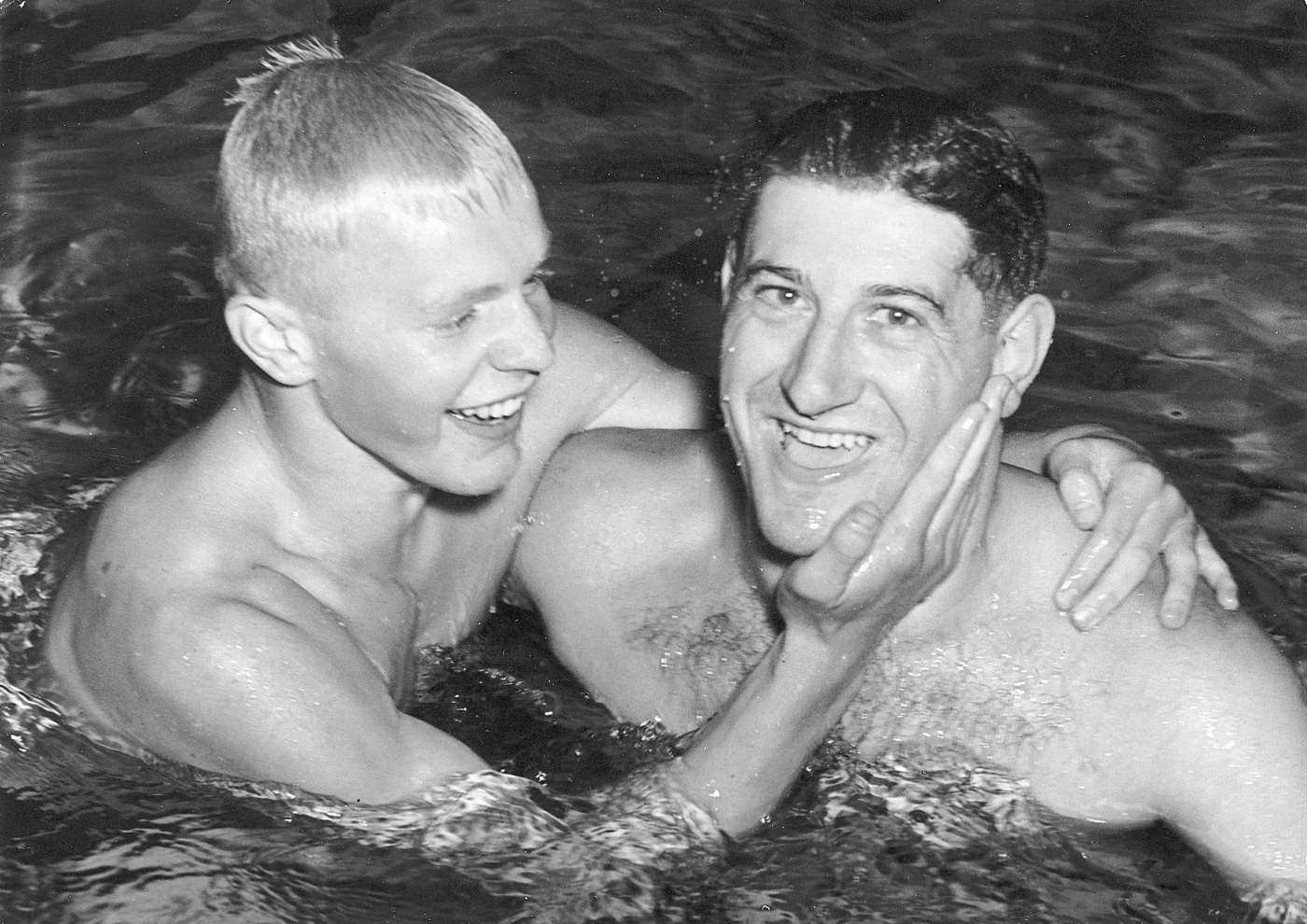
- Göran Larsson and Olle Johansson (right)

Personal information
- Full name: Olle Ingvar Johansson
- Born: 16 September 1927 Borås, Sweden
- Died: 9 August 1994 (aged 66) Gothenburg, Sweden

Sport
- Sport: Swimming, water polo
- Club: IF Elfsborg, Borås
Medal record
Swimming
Representing Sweden
European Championships (LC)
Gold medal – first place	1947 Monte Carlo	4×200 m freestyle
Gold medal – first place	1950 Vienna	4×200 m freestyle

Olle Ingvar Johansson (16 September 1927 – 9 August 1994) was a Swedish swimmer and water polo player who competed in the 1948 and 1952 Summer Olympics. His 4 × 200 m freestyle teams finished fourth on both occasions, and his water polo team was fifth in 1948. Johansson won two European gold medals in the 4 × 200 m freestyle relay, in 1947 and 1950.
