= Joseph Bernardo =

French swimmer (1929–2023)

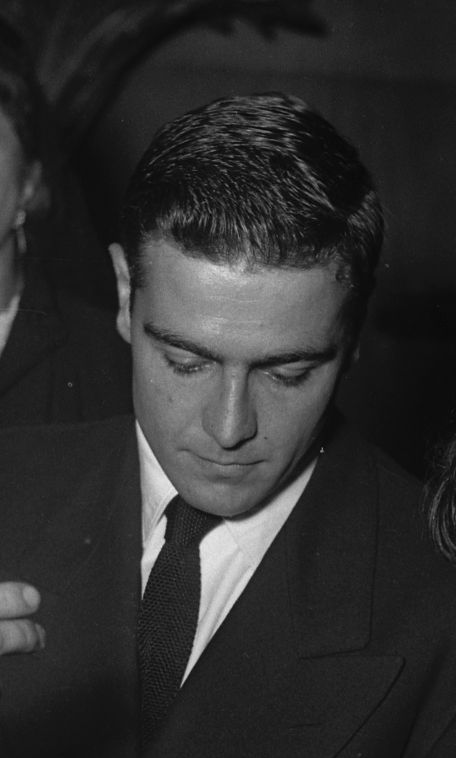
- Bernardo in 1952

Personal information
- Born: 31 May 1929
- Died: 6 December 2023 (aged 94)

Sport
- Sport: Swimming
Medal record
Representing France
Men's swimming
Olympic Games
Bronze medal – third place	1948 London	4x200 m freestyle
Bronze medal – third place	1952 Helsinki	4x200 m freestyle
European Championships
Silver medal – second place	1950 Vienna	4×200 m freestyle
Mediterranean Games
Gold medal – first place	1951 Alexandria	4x200m freestyle relay
Silver medal – second place	1951 Alexandria	400m freestyle
Silver medal – second place	1951 Alexandria	1500m freestyle

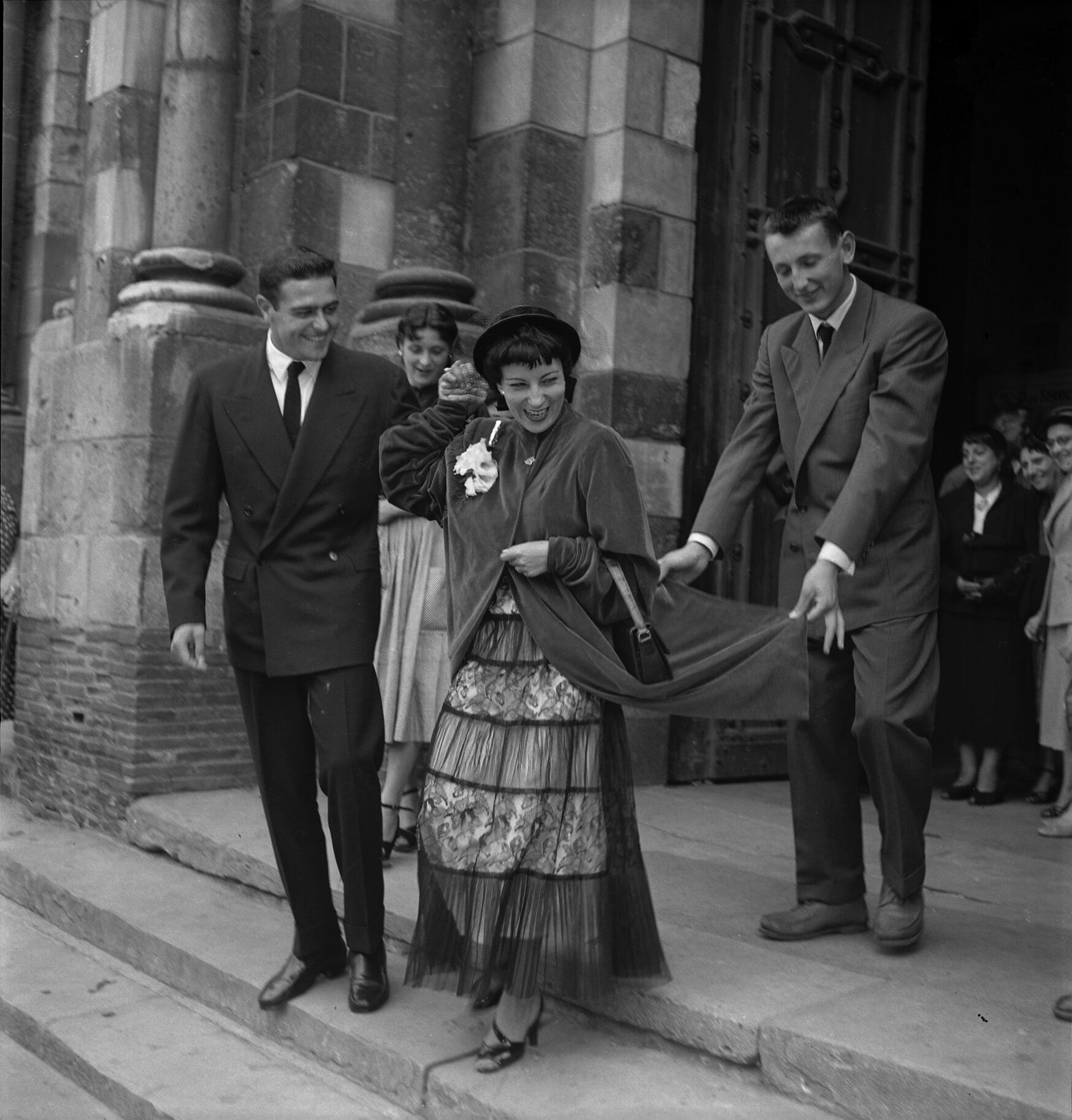
Marriage of Simone Turck and Bernardo (Toulouse, 1952)

Joseph Bernardo (31 May 1929 – 6 December 2023) was a French swimmer and Olympic medalist.

== Biography ==
Joseph Bernardo was born in Algiers, French Algeria. He competed at the 1952 Olympic Games in Helsinki, where he received a bronze medal in 4 × 200 m freestyle relay with the French swimming team (with Jean Boiteux, Aldo Eminente, and Alexandre Jany).

Bernardo married actress and theater director Simone Turck in 1952.

Bernardo died on 6 December 2023, at the age of 94.
