= French ship Le Glorieux =

At least four ships of the French Navy have borne the name Le Glorieux:

- French ship Le Glorieux (1677), flagship of Jean d'Estrées, sunk at the Battle of Tabago in 1677.
- French ship Le Glorieux (1693), a late-17th-century ship commanded by Jean Bart.
- French ship Le Glorieux (1749), a 528-ton, 16-gun ship built in Saint-Malo in 1749.
- French submarine Le Glorieux (1932), a Redoutable-class submarine commissioned in 1934 and decommissioned in 1952

== See also ==
- French ship Glorieux (1756), a second-rate 74-gun ship-of-the-line in the French Navy launched in 1756, later commissioned in the Royal Navy as HMS Glorieux
