= Ricardo Conde =

Spanish swimmer (1930–1994)

Personal information
- Born: 4 November 1930 Barcelona, Spain
- Died: 2 September 1994 (aged 63) Barcelona, Spain

Sport
- Sport: Swimming
Medal record
Men's swimming
Representing Spain
Mediterranean Games
Bronze medal – third place	1951 Alexandria	3×100 m medley

Ricardo Conde (4 November 1930 – 2 September 1994) was a Spanish swimmer. He competed in the men's 100 metre freestyle and the water polo tournament at the 1952 Summer Olympics.
