= Trevor Reinders =

Zimbabwean cricketer (born 1963)

Personal information
- Full name: Trevor Murray Reinders
- Born: 10 October 1963 (age 63); Salisbury, Southern Rhodesia
- Batting: Right-handed
- Bowling: Right-arm medium

Domestic team information
- Years: Team
- 1993/94: Mashonaland Country Districts

Career statistics
| Competition | FC |
|---|---|
| Matches | 1 |
| Runs scored | 5 |
| Batting average | 5.00 |
| 100s/50s | 0/0 |
| Top score | 4* |
| Balls bowled | 138 |
| Wickets | 2 |
| Bowling average | 28.50 |
| 5 wickets in innings | 0 |
| 10 wickets in match | 0 |
| Best bowling | 2/34 |
| Catches/stumpings | 1/– |
- Source: ESPNcricinfo, 19 July 2021

Trevor Murray Reinders (born 10 October 1963) is a former Zimbabwean cricketer. A right-handed batsman and right-arm medium pace bowler, he played two first-class matches for Mashonaland Country Districts during the 1993–94 Logan Cup.
