= Isidoro Martínez-Vela =

Spanish swimmer

Personal information
- Born: 17 January 1925 Barcelona, Spain
- Died: 18 July 2012 (aged 87) Benidorm, Spain

Sport
- Sport: Swimming
Medal record
Representing Spain
Mediterranean Games
Silver medal – second place	1951 Alexandria	4x200m freestyle relay

Isidoro Martínez-Vela (17 January 1925 – 18 July 2012) was a Spanish freestyle swimmer. He competed in three events at the 1948 Summer Olympics.
