= Alex Bourgeois =

Belgian fencer

Personal information
- Full name: Alexandre Marcel Paul Maurice Bourgeois
- Born: 18 April 1914 Ixelles, Belgium

Sport
- Sport: Fencing

Alex Bourgeois (born 18 April 1914, date of death unknown) was a Belgian fencer. He competed in the team foil event at the 1952 Summer Olympics.
