= Christian Pire =

French diver (1930–2000)

Personal information
- Nationality: French
- Born: 1 September 1930 Tunis, Tunisia
- Died: 13 June 2000 (aged 69) Paris, France

Sport
- Sport: Diving
Medal record
Men's diving
Representing France
European Championships
Bronze medal – third place	1954 Turin	3 m springboard

Christian Pire (1 September 1930 – 13 June 2000) was a French diver. He competed at the 1956 Summer Olympics and the 1960 Summer Olympics.
