= Alfons Bierebeek =

Belgian swimmer

Personal information
- Born: 10 June 1934 (age 92)

Sport
- Sport: Swimming

Alfons Bierebeek (born 10 June 1934) is a Belgian former swimmer. He competed in the men's 4 × 200 metre freestyle relay at the 1952 Summer Olympics.
