= Alphonse Vandenrydt =

Belgian long-distance runner (1927–2026)

Personal information
- Full name: Alphonse René Vandenrydt
- Nationality: Belgian
- Born: 12 April 1927 Ixelles, Belgium
- Died: 7 August 2026 (aged 99) Dilbeek, Belgium

Sport
- Sport: Long-distance running
- Event: 5000 metres

Alphonse René Vandenrydt (12 April 1927 – 7 August 2026) was a Belgian long-distance runner. He competed in the men's 5000 metres at the 1952 Summer Olympics. Vandenrydt died in Dilbeek on 7 August 2026, at the age of 99.
