= Enrique Granados (swimmer) =

Spanish swimmer (1934–2018)

Personal information
- Nationality: Spanish
- Born: 9 August 1934 Barcelona, Spanish Republic
- Died: 27 October 2018 (aged 84) Bunyola, Spain

Sport
- Sport: Swimming
Medal record
Representing Spain
Mediterranean Games
Silver medal – second place	1951 Alexandria	4x200m freestyle relay
Bronze medal – third place	1951 Alexandria	400m freestyle
Bronze medal – third place	1951 Alexandria	1500m freestyle

Enrique Granados (9 August 1934 – 27 October 2018) was a Spanish freestyle swimmer. He competed in two events at the 1952 Summer Olympics.
