= Göran Larsson (swimmer) =

Swedish swimmer

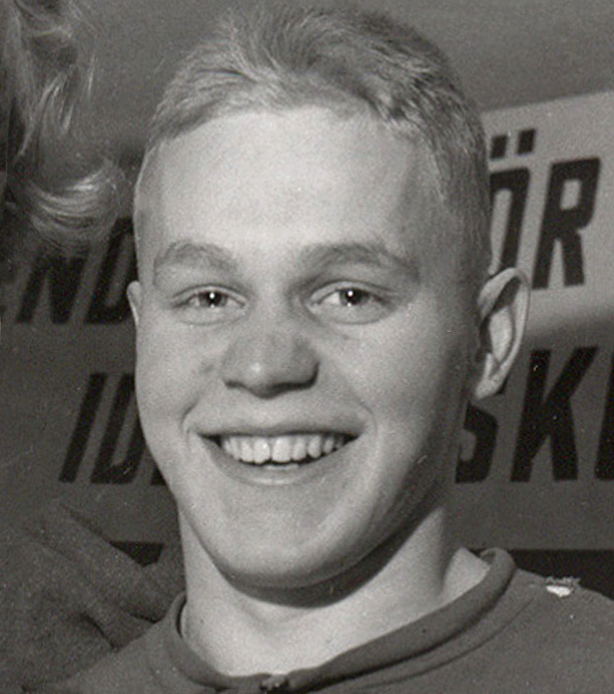

Personal information
- Born: 24 May 1932 Uppsala, Sweden
- Died: 27 February 1989 (aged 56) Haninge, Sweden

Sport
- Sport: Swimming
- Club: Stockholms KK
Medal record
Representing Sweden
Olympic Games
Bronze medal – third place	1952 Helsinki	100 m freestyle
European Championships
Gold medal – first place	1950 Vienna	100 m backstroke
Gold medal – first place	1950 Vienna	4×200 m freestyle
Silver medal – second place	1950 Vienna	100 m freestyle

Göran Larsson (24 May 1932 – 27 February 1989) was a Swedish freestyle swimmer.

== Swimming career ==
Larsson competed at the 1952 Summer Olympics in the 100 m and 4 × 200 m relay events and finished in third and fourth place, respectively. He won two gold and one silver medals at the 1950 European Championships. He won the 1951 'Open' British ASA National Championship 110 yards freestyle title and the 1951 ASA National Championship 220 yards freestyle title.
