= Pierre Van Houdt =

Belgian fencer

Personal information
- Born: 30 October 1914

Sport
- Sport: Fencing

Pierre Van Houdt (born 30 October 1914, date of death unknown) was a Belgian Olympic fencer. He competed at the 1952 Summer Olympics.
