= Gabriel Glorieux =

Belgian cyclist

Personal information
- Born: 11 June 1930 Quévy-le-Petit, Belgium
- Died: 20 August 2007 (aged 77) Mons, Belgium

Cycling career
- Sport: Cycling

Gabriel Glorieux (11 June 1930 – 20 August 2007) was a Belgian cyclist. He competed in two events at the 1952 Summer Olympics.
