= Nguyễn Văn Phan =

Vietnamese swimmer

Personal information
- Born: 30 June 1929

Sport
- Sport: Swimming

Nguyễn Văn Phan (born 30 June 1929) is a Vietnamese former swimmer. He competed in two events at the 1952 Summer Olympics.
