= Guy Montserret =

French swimmer (1935–2014)

Personal information
- Born: 24 June 1935
- Died: 26 November 2014 (aged 79)

Sport
- Sport: Swimming
Medal record
Men's swimming
Representing France
European Championships
Silver medal – second place	1954 Turin	4×200 m freestyle
Mediterranean Games
Gold medal – first place	1959 Beirut	1500 m freestyle
Gold medal – first place	1955 Barcelona	4×200 m freestyle
Bronze medal – third place	1955 Barcelona	400 m freestyle
Bronze medal – third place	1955 Barcelona	1500 m freestyle
Bronze medal – third place	1959 Beirut	400 m freestyle

Guy Montserrat (24 June 1935 – 26 November 2014) was a French freestyle swimmer. He competed in two events at the 1956 Summer Olympics.
