= Kamiel Reynders =

Belgian swimmer

Personal information
- Born: 22 February 1931 Antwerp, Belgium

Sport
- Sport: Swimming

Kamiel Reynders (born 22 February 1931) is a Belgian former swimmer. He competed in the men's 4 × 200 metre freestyle relay at the 1952 Summer Olympics.
