= Michel Vandamme =

French swimmer (1930–2019)

Personal information
- Born: June 27, 1930
- Died: January 10, 2019 (aged 88)

Sport
- Sport: Swimming
Medal record
Representing France
Mediterranean Games
Gold medal – first place	1951 Alexandria	4x200m freestyle relay

Michel Vandamme (27 June 1930 – 10 January 2019) was a French swimmer who competed in the 1952 Summer Olympics.
