= Egidio Massaria =

Italian swimmer (1925–1995)

Personal information
- Born: 2 September 1925 Venice, Italy
- Died: 21 October 1995 (aged 70)

Sport
- Sport: Swimming
Medal record
Representing Italy
Mediterranean Games
Silver medal – second place	1951 Alexandria	100m backstroke
Silver medal – second place	1951 Alexandria	3x100m medley relay
Bronze medal – third place	1955 Barcelona	100m backstroke

Egidio Massaria (2 September 1925 – 21 October 1995) was an Italian swimmer. He competed in two events at the 1952 Summer Olympics.
