= Robert Bayot =

Belgian fencer

Personal information
- Born: 4 September 1915 Schaerbeek, Belgium
- Died: 9 January 1964 (aged 48) Brussels, Belgium

Sport
- Sport: Fencing

Robert Jean Hubert Bayot (4 September 1915 – 9 January 1964) was a Belgian fencer. He competed in the team sabre events at the 1948 and 1952 Summer Olympics.
