= Maurice Lusien =

French swimmer (1926–2017)

Personal information
- Born: August 17, 1926
- Died: March 10, 2017 (aged 90)

Sport
- Sport: Swimming
Medal record
Representing France
European Championships
Silver medal – second place	1950 Vienna	200 m breaststroke
Mediterranean Games
Gold medal – first place	1951 Alexandria	200m breaststroke
Gold medal – first place	1951 Alexandria	3x100m medley relay
Gold medal – first place	1955 Barcelona	200m butterfly
Gold medal – first place	1955 Barcelona	4x100m medley relay

Maurice Lusien (17 August 1926 – 10 March 2017) was a French swimmer who competed in the 1948 Summer Olympics and in the 1952 Summer Olympics.
