= Hiroshi Suzuki (swimmer) =

Japanese swimmer (born 1933)

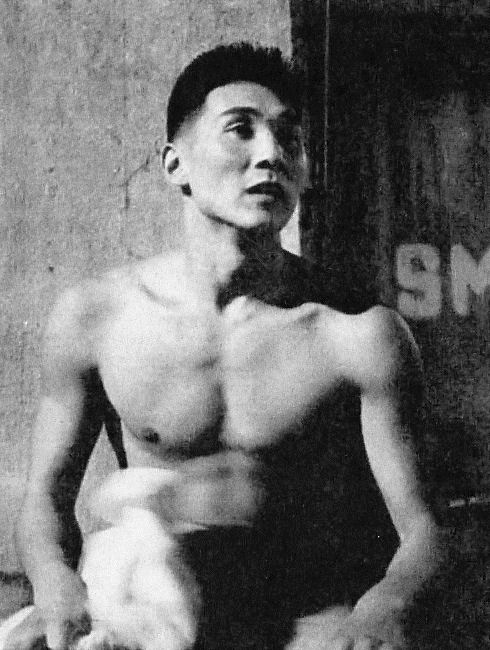

Personal information
- Born: September 18, 1933 (age 92) Aichi Prefecture, Empire of Japan

Sport
- Sport: Swimming
Medal record
Representing Japan
Olympic Games
Silver medal – second place	1952 Helsinki	100 m freestyle
Silver medal – second place	1952 Helsinki	4×200 m freestyle
Asian Games
Gold medal – first place	1954 Manila	100 m freestyle
Gold medal – first place	1954 Manila	4×200 m freestyle

Hiroshi Suzuki (鈴木 弘, Suzuki Hiroshi; born September 18, 1933) is a retired Japanese freestyle swimmer. He competed in the 100 m and 4×200 m relay events at the 1952 and 1956 Olympics and won two silver medals in 1952. In the 100 m event in the 1952 Olympics, Hiroshi actually posted an identical time to the eventual gold medal winner, Clarke Scholes of the US. Officials used a judges decision to award Clarke Scholes the gold medal and Hiroshi Suzuki the silver medal. He won gold medals in these two events at the 1954 Asian Games.
