= Gilbert Bozon =

French swimmer (1935–2007)

Personal information
- Born: 19 March 1935 Troyes, France
- Died: 21 July 2007 (aged 72)

Sport
- Sport: Swimming
Medal record
Representing France
Olympic Games
Silver medal – second place	1952 Helsinki	100 m backstroke
European Championships
Gold medal – first place	1954 Turin	100 m backstroke
Silver medal – second place	1954 Turin	4×200 m freestyle
Mediterranean Games
Gold medal – first place	1951 Alexandria	100 m backstroke
Gold medal – first place	1955 Barcelona	100 m backstroke

Gilbert Bozon (19 March 1935 – 21 July 2007) was a French swimmer and Olympic medalist.

== Career ==
Bozon was born in Troyes. He competed at the 1952 Olympic Games in Helsinki, where he received a silver medal in 100 m backstroke.

== See also ==
- World record progression 200 metres backstroke
