= Jean Boiteux =

French swimmer

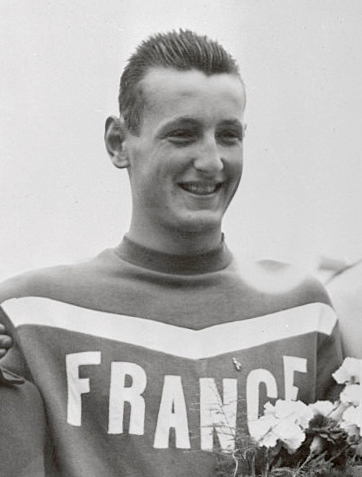
- Boiteux at the 1952 Olympics

Personal information
- Born: 20 June 1933 La Ciotat, France
- Died: 11 April 2010 (aged 76) Bordeaux, France
- Height: 186 cm (6 ft 1 in)
- Weight: 83 kg (183 lb)

Sport
- Sport: Swimming
- Event: freestyle
- Club: Dauphins du TOEC; JUS Oran; Girondins de Bordeaux

Achievements and titles
- Personal best(s): 200 m – 2:08.3 (1956); 400 m – 4:29.0 (1956); 800 m – 9:38.2 (1952); 1500 m – 18:25.2 (1956)
Medal record
Representing France
Olympic Games
Gold medal – first place	1952 Helsinki	400 m freestyle
Bronze medal – third place	1952 Helsinki	4×200 m freestyle
European Championships
Silver medal – second place	1950 Vienna	400 m freestyle
Silver medal – second place	1950 Vienna	1500 m freestyle
Silver medal – second place	1950 Vienna	4×200 m freestyle
Silver medal – second place	1954 Turin	4×200 m freestyle
Mediterranean Games
Gold medal – first place	1951 Alexandria	400 m freestyle
Gold medal – first place	1951 Alexandria	1500 m freestyle
Gold medal – first place	1951 Alexandria	4×200 m freestyle
Gold medal – first place	1955 Barcelona	400 m freestyle
Gold medal – first place	1955 Barcelona	1500 m freestyle
Gold medal – first place	1955 Barcelona	4×200 m freestyle

Jean Boiteux (20 June 1933 – 11 April 2010) was a French freestyle swimmer. He competed at the 1952, 1956 and 1960 Olympics and won the 400 m event in 1952, breaking the Olympic record and becoming the first French swimmer to win an Olympic gold medal. During his career he won 15 national titles and set 15 national and 10 European records in the 200 m, 400 m, 1500 m and 4 × 200 m events.

His mother Bienna Pélégry was also an Olympic swimmer. His father attended the 1952 Olympics and jumped in the swimming pool to congratulate his son after he won the 400 m race. In 1973 Boiteux founded the Jean-Boiteux Grand Prix swimming meet in Bordeaux. He died after falling from a tree in his garden on 11 April 2010 at the age of 76.

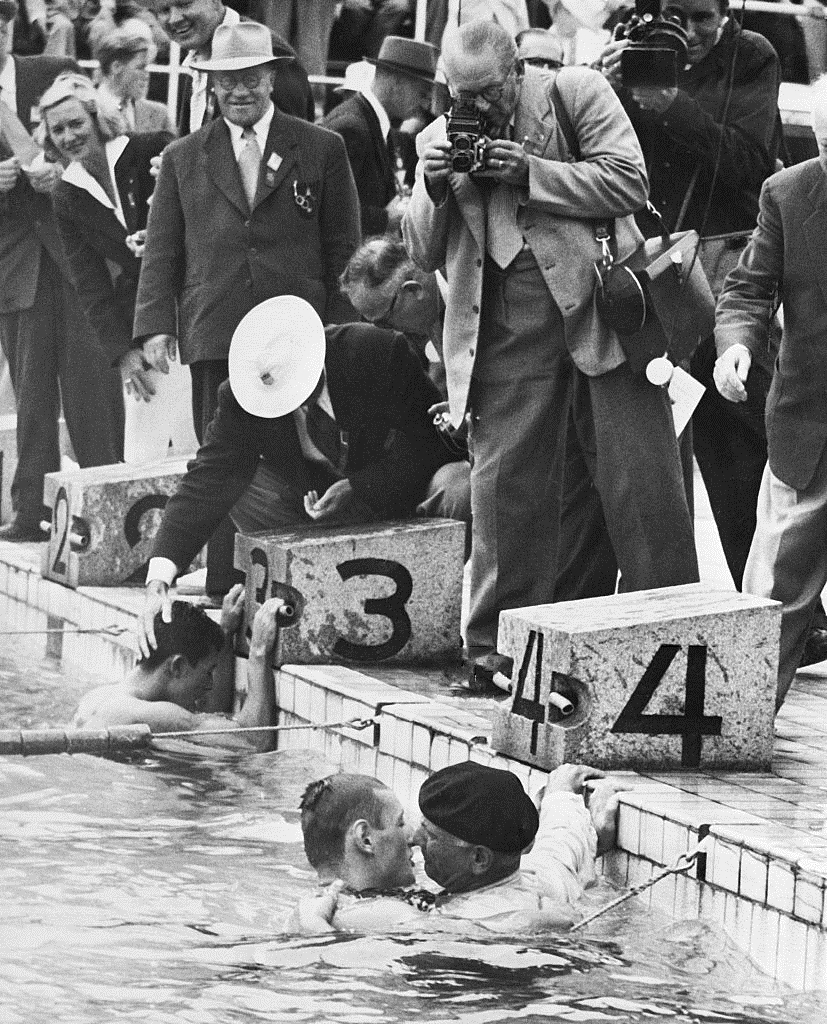
Boiteux with father at the 1952 Olympics

== See also ==
- List of members of the International Swimming Hall of Fame
