= Alex Jany =

French swimmer (1929–2001)

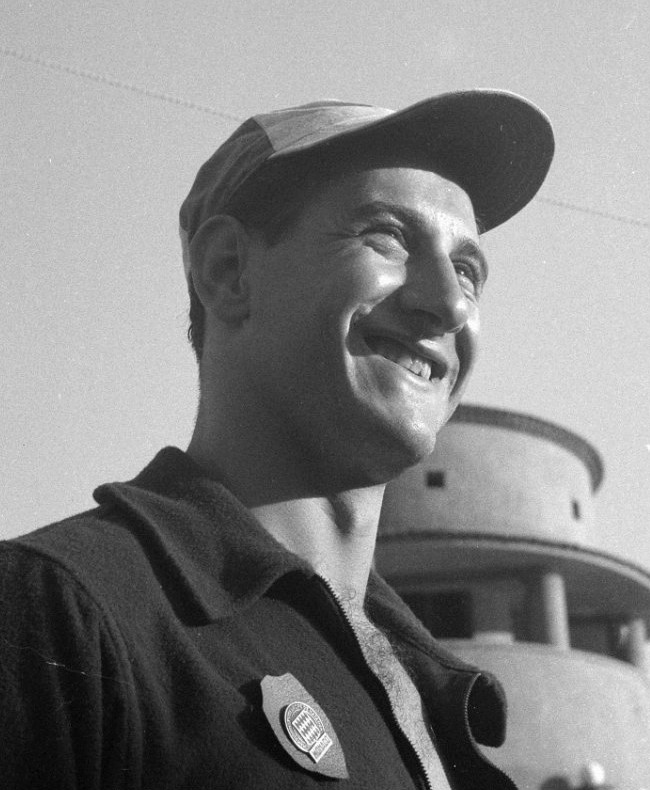
- Alex Jany at the 1947 European Swimming Championships in Monaco

Personal information
- Full name: Alexandre Charles Sixte Jany
- Born: 5 January 1929 Toulouse, France
- Died: 18 July 2001 (aged 72) Marseille, France
- Height: 187 cm (6 ft 2 in)
- Weight: 107 kg (236 lb)

Sport
- Sport: Swimming
- Strokes: Freestyle
- Club: Dauphins du TOEC, Toulouse; CRS Marseille
Medal record
Men's swimming
Representing France
Olympic Games
Bronze medal – third place	1948 London	4×200 m freestyle
Bronze medal – third place	1952 Helsinki	4×200 m freestyle
European Championships
Gold medal – first place	1947 Monte Carlo	100 m freestyle
Gold medal – first place	1947 Monte Carlo	400 m freestyle
Silver medal – second place	1947 Monte Carlo	4×200 m freestyle
Gold medal – first place	1950 Vienna	100 m freestyle
Gold medal – first place	1950 Vienna	400 m freestyle
Silver medal – second place	1950 Vienna	4×200 m freestyle
Mediterranean Games
Gold medal – first place	1951 Alexandria	100 m freestyle

Alexandre Charles Sixte Jany (5 January 1929 – 18 July 2001) was a French freestyle swimmer and water polo player. As a swimmer, he competed in 100–400 m events at the 1948, 1952 and 1956 Olympics, alongside his sister Ginette Jany-Sendral, and he won bronze medals in the 4 × 200 m relay in 1948 and 1952. In 1948 he placed fifth-sixth in the individual 100 m and 400 m events; he won those events at the 1947 and 1950 European championships, setting world records in both in 1947. At the 1960 Olympics he competed only in water polo and placed ninth. In 1977 he was inducted into the International Swimming Hall of Fame.

He won the 1946 ASA British 'Open' National Championship 100 metres freestyle title.

== See also ==
- List of members of the International Swimming Hall of Fame
