= Coxed pair at the Olympics =

Olympic sport

Coxed pair at the Olympic Games
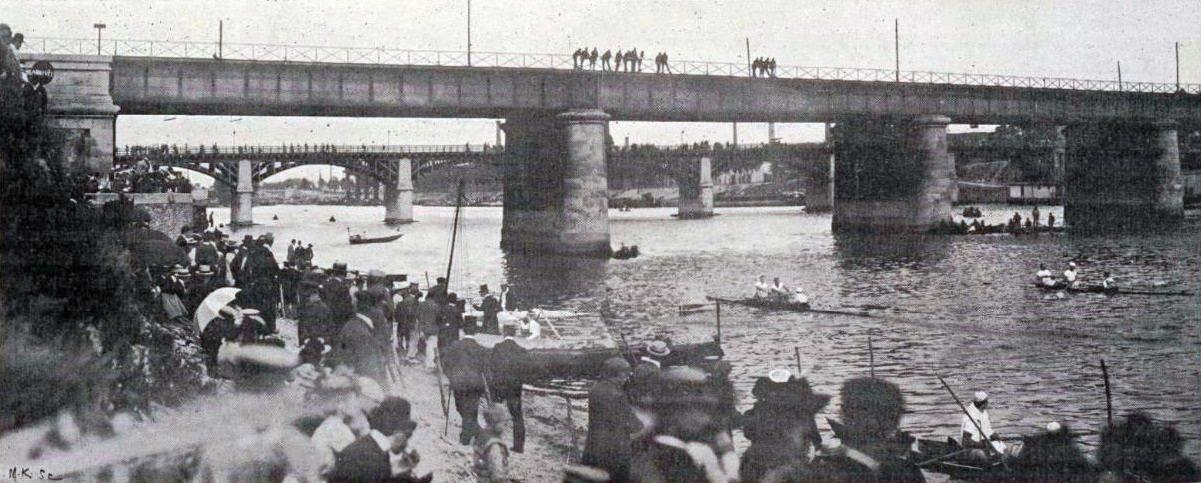
- Coxed pair at the 1900 Summer Olympics

Overview
- Sport: Rowing
- Gender: Men
- Years held: Men: 1900, 1920–1992

Reigning champion
- Men: Great Britain; Greg Searle; Jonny Searle; Garry Herbert (cox)

The coxed pair was a rowing event held at the Summer Olympics. The event was first held for men at the second modern Olympics in 1900. It was not held in 1904, 1908, or 1912. It returned after World War I and was held from 1920 until it was removed from the programme following the 1992 Games, at which point it and the men's coxed four were replaced with the men's lightweight double sculls and men's lightweight coxless four. When women's rowing was added in 1976, only 6 of the 8 men's events had a women's equivalent; the coxed pair and the coxless four were the ones omitted. The coxed pair has never had a women's competition at the Olympics.

== Medalists ==
=== Men ===
Games	Gold	Silver	Bronze
1900 Paris	Mixed team François Brandt; Roelof Klein; Hermanus Brockmann (cox, heats); Unknown French boy (cox, final)	France Lucien Martinet; René Waleff; Unknown (cox)	France Carlos Deltour; Antoine Védrenne; Raoul Paoli (cox)
1920 Antwerp	Italy Ercole Olgeni; Giovanni Scatturin; Guido De Felip (cox)	France Maurice Monney-Bouton; Gabriel Poix; Ernest Barberolle (cox)	Switzerland Édouard Candeveau; Alfred Felber; Paul Piaget (cox)
1924 Paris	Switzerland Édouard Candeveau; Alfred Felber; Émile Lachapelle (cox)	Italy Ercole Olgeni; Giovanni Scatturin; Gino Sopracordevole (cox)	United States Leon Butler; Harold Wilson; Edward Jennings (cox)
1928 Amsterdam	Switzerland Hans Schöchlin; Karl Schöchlin; Hans Bourquin (cox)	France Armand Marcelle; Édouard Marcelle; Henri Préaux (cox)	Belgium Léon Flament; François de Coninck; Georges Anthony (cox)
1932 Los Angeles	United States Charles Kieffer; Joseph Schauers; Edward Jennings (cox)	Poland Jerzy Braun; Janusz Ślązak; Jerzy Skolimowski (cox)	France Anselme Brusa; André Giriat; Pierre Brunet (cox)
1936 Berlin	Germany Gerhard Gustmann; Herbert Adamski; Dieter Arend (cox)	Italy Almiro Bergamo; Guido Santin; Luciano Negrini (cox)	France Marceau Fourcade; Georges Tapie; Noël Vandernotte (cox)
1948 London	Denmark Finn Pedersen; Tage Henriksen; Carl-Ebbe Andersen (cox)	Italy Giovanni Steffè; Aldo Tarlao; Alberto Radi (cox)	Hungary Antal Szendey; Béla Zsitnik; Róbert Zimonyi (cox)
1952 Helsinki	France Raymond Salles; Gaston Mercier; Bernard Malivoire (cox)	Germany Heinz Manchen; Helmut Heinhold; Helmut Noll (cox)	Denmark Svend Ove Pedersen; Poul Svendsen; Jørgen Frantzen (cox)
1956 Melbourne	United States Arthur Ayrault; Conn Findlay; Kurt Seiffert (cox)	United Team of Germany Karl-Heinrich von Groddeck; Horst Arndt; Rainer Borkowsky (cox)	Soviet Union Ihor Yemchuk; Heorhiy Zhylin; Vladimir Petrov (cox)
1960 Rome	United Team of Germany Bernhard Knubel; Heinz Renneberg; Klaus Zerta (cox)	Soviet Union Antanas Bagdonavičius; Zigmas Jukna; Igor Rudakov (cox)	United States Richard Draeger; Conn Findlay; Kent Mitchell (cox)
1964 Tokyo	United States Edward Ferry; Conn Findlay; Kent Mitchell (cox)	France Jacques Morel; Georges Morel; Jean-Claude Darouy (cox)	Netherlands Herman Rouwé; Erik Hartsuiker; Jan Just Bos (cox)
1968 Mexico City	Italy Primo Baran; Renzo Sambo; Bruno Cipolla (cox)	Netherlands Herman Suselbeek; Hadriaan van Nes; Roderick Rijnders (cox)	Denmark Jørn Krab; Harry Jørgensen; Preben Krab (cox)
1972 Munich	East Germany Wolfgang Gunkel; Jörg Lucke; Klaus-Dieter Neubert (cox)	Czechoslovakia Oldřich Svojanovský; Pavel Svojanovský; Vladimír Petříček (cox)	Romania Ștefan Tudor; Petre Ceapura; Ladislau Lovrenschi (cox)
1976 Montreal	East Germany Harald Jährling; Friedrich-Wilhelm Ulrich; Georg Spohr (cox)	Soviet Union Dmitry Bekhterev; Yuriy Shurkalov; Yuriy Lorentsson (cox)	Czechoslovakia Oldřich Svojanovský; Pavel Svojanovský; Ludvík Vébr (cox)
1980 Moscow	East Germany Harald Jährling; Friedrich-Wilhelm Ulrich; Georg Spohr (cox)	Soviet Union Viktor Pereverzev; Gennadi Kryuçkin; Aleksandr Lukyanov (cox)	Yugoslavia Duško Mrduljaš; Zlatko Celent; Josip Reić (cox)
1984 Los Angeles	Italy Carmine Abbagnale; Giuseppe Abbagnale; Giuseppe Di Capua (cox)	Romania Dimitrie Popescu; Vasile Tomoiagă; Dumitru Răducanu (cox)	United States Kevin Still; Robert Espeseth; Doug Herland (cox)
1988 Seoul	Italy Carmine Abbagnale; Giuseppe Abbagnale; Giuseppe Di Capua (cox)	East Germany Mario Streit; Detlef Kirchhoff; René Rensch (cox)	Great Britain Andy Holmes; Steve Redgrave; Patrick Sweeney (cox)
1992 Barcelona	Great Britain Greg Searle; Jonny Searle; Garry Herbert (cox)	Italy Carmine Abbagnale; Giuseppe Abbagnale; Giuseppe Di Capua (cox)	Romania Dimitrie Popescu; Nicolae Țaga; Dumitru Răducanu (cox)

==== Multiple medalists ====
Rank	Gymnast	Nation	Olympics	Gold	Silver	Bronze	Total
1	Carmine Abbagnale	Italy	1984–1992	2	1	0	3
1	Giuseppe Abbagnale	Italy	1984–1992	2	1	0	3
1	Giuseppe Di Capua	Italy	1984–1992	2	1	0	3
4	Conn Findlay	United States	1956–1964	2	0	1	3
5	Harald Jährling	East Germany	1976–1980	2	0	0	2
5	Georg Spohr	East Germany	1976–1980	2	0	0	2
5	Friedrich-Wilhelm Ulrich	East Germany	1976–1980	2	0	0	2
8	Ercole Olgeni	Italy	1920–1924	1	1	0	2
8	Giovanni Scatturin	Italy	1920–1924	1	1	0	2
10	Édouard Candeveau	Switzerland	1920–1924	1	0	1	2
10	Alfred Felber	Switzerland	1920–1924	1	0	1	2
10	Edward Jennings	United States	1924, 1932	1	0	1	2
10	Kent Mitchell	United States	1960–1964	1	0	1	2
14	Oldřich Svojanovský	Czechoslovakia	1972–1976	0	1	1	2
14	Pavel Svojanovský	Czechoslovakia	1972–1976	0	1	1	2
14	Dimitrie Popescu	Romania	1984, 1992	0	1	1	2
14	Dumitru Răducanu	Romania	1984, 1992	0	1	1	2

==== Medalists by country ====
Rank	Nation	Gold	Silver	Bronze	Total
1	Italy	4	4	0	8
2	East Germany	3	1	0	4
3	United States	3	0	3	6
4	Switzerland	2	0	1	3
5	France	1	4	3	8
6	Germany	1	1	0	2
6	United Team of Germany	1	1	0	2
8	Denmark	1	0	2	3
9	Great Britain	1	0	1	2
10	Mixed team	1	0	0	1
11	Soviet Union	0	3	1	4
12	Romania	0	1	2	3
13	Czechoslovakia	0	1	1	2
13	Netherlands	0	1	1	2
15	Poland	0	1	0	1
16	Belgium	0	0	1	1
16	Hungary	0	0	1	1
16	Yugoslavia	0	0	1	1
