= Rowing at the 1952 Summer Olympics – Men's coxed pair =

Men's coxed pairs at the Games of the XV Olympiad
- Rowing pictogram
- Venue: Meilahti
- Dates: 20–23 July 1952
- Competitors: 45 from 15 nations
- Winning time: 8:28.6

Medalists
1st place, gold medalist(s)		Raymond Salles; Gaston Mercier; Bernard Malivoire (cox); France
2nd place, silver medalist(s)		Heinz Manchen; Helmut Heinhold; Helmut Noll (cox); Germany
3rd place, bronze medalist(s)		Svend Ove Pedersen; Poul Svendsen; Jørgen Frantzen (cox); Denmark

The men's coxed pair competition at the 1952 Summer Olympics took place at Meilahti, Finland. It was held from 20 to 23 July. There were 15 boats (45 competitors) from 15 nations, with each nation limited to a single boat in the event. The event was won by French team Raymond Salles, Gaston Mercier, and coxswain Bernard Malivoire; it was the nation's first victory in the event (though a French boy had been the cox for a mixed team that won gold in 1900). Germany, which had won the event in 1936 but had been excluded from the 1948 Games after World War II, took silver (Heinz Manchen, Helmut Heinhold, and cox Helmut Noll). Sweden, the defending champions, had an all-new crew of Svend Ove Pedersen, Poul Svendsen, and cox Jørgen Frantzen; they took bronze.

== Background ==
This was the eighth appearance of the event. Rowing had been on the programme in 1896 but was cancelled due to bad weather. The men's coxed pair was one of the original four events in 1900, but was not held in 1904, 1908, or 1912. It returned to the programme after World War I and was held every Games from 1924 to 1992, when it (along with the men's coxed four) was replaced with the men's lightweight double sculls and men's lightweight coxless four.

Three of the 28 competitors from the 1948 coxed pair event returned: one of the rowers from Italy's silver medal team, Aldo Tarlao, and the coxswains from Hungary (bronze medal winning Róbert Zimonyi) and Greece (ninth-place finisher Grigorios Emmanouil). Favorite status went to the winners of the last three European championships, the Italian team of Tarlao, Giuseppe Ramani, and Luciano Marion. Switzerland's Walter Lüchinger, Alex Siebenhaar, and Walter Ludin had been the runner-up the last two European events.

Egypt, Finland, the Soviet Union, and Sweden each made their debut in the event. France made its eighth appearance, the only nation to have competed in all editions of the event to that point.

== Competition format ==
The coxed pair event featured three-person boats, with two rowers and a coxswain. It was a sweep rowing event, with the rowers each having one oar (and thus each rowing on one side). The course returned to the 2000 metres distance that became the Olympic standard in 1912 (with the exception of 1948).

The competition expanded from previous years to include a second repechage after the semifinals. This brought the tournament to five rounds total: quarterfinals, semifinals, and a final with two repechages after the first two rounds.

- Quarterfinals: There were 4 quarterfinals, with 3 or 4 boats each. Two boats from each heat (8 boats total) advanced to the semifinals; all other boats (7 boats total) went to the first repechage.
- First repechage: There were 2 repechage heats, with 3 or 4 boats each. The winner of each heat (2 boats) went to the second repechage (not the semifinals); all other boats (5 total) were eliminated.
- Semifinals: There were 2 semifinals, each with 4 boats. The winner of each heat (2 boats) advanced directly to the final; the remaining boats (6 total) went to the second repechage.
- Second repechage: There were 3 heats, with 2 or 3 boats each. The winner of each heat (3 boats) advanced to the final, with the rest of the boats (5 total) eliminated.
- Final: A single final, with 5 boats.

== Schedule ==
All times are Eastern European Summer Time (UTC+3)

Date	Time	Round
Sunday, 20 July 1952		Quarterfinals
Monday, 21 July 1952	9:00; 16:00	First repechage Semifinals
Tuesday, 22 July 1952	9:00	Second repechage
Wednesday, 23 July 1952	17:30	Final

== Results ==
The following rowers took part:

=== Quarterfinals ===
==== Quarterfinal 1 ====
Rank	Rowers	Coxswain	Nation	Time	Notes
1	Heinz Manchen; Helmut Heinhold	Helmut Noll	Germany	8:02.3	Q
2	Hippolyte Mattelé; Eugène Jacobs	Kamiel Van Dooren	Belgium	8:05.3	Q
3	Veijo Mikkolainen; Toimi Pitkänen	Erkki Lyijynen	Finland	8:06.6	R
4	Francisco Furtado; Harry Mosé	João Maio	Brazil	8:19.0	R

==== Quarterfinal 2 ====
Rank	Rowers	Coxswain	Nation	Time	Notes
1	Raymond Salles; Gaston Mercier	Bernard Malivoire	France	7:57.7	Q
2	Czesław Lorenc; Romuald Thomas	Zdzisław Michalski	Poland	7:59.8	Q
3	Walter Lüchinger; Alex Siebenhaar	Walter Ludin	Switzerland	8:16.4	R

==== Quarterfinal 3 ====
Rank	Rowers	Coxswain	Nation	Time	Notes
1	James Fifer; Duvall Hecht	James Beggs	United States	8:02.1	Q
2	László Halász; József Sátori	Róbert Zimonyi	Hungary	8:04.1	Q
3	Ove Nilsson; Ingemar Svensson	Lars-Erik Larsson	Sweden	8:07.6	R
4	Mohamed Anwar; Ali Tawfik Youssif	Albert Selim El-Mankabadi	Egypt	8:29.3	R

==== Quarterfinal 4 ====
Rank	Rowers	Coxswain	Nation	Time	Notes
1	Giuseppe Ramani; Aldo Tarlao	Luciano Marion	Italy	7:59.9	Q
2	Svend Ove Pedersen; Poul Svendsen	Jørgen Frantzen	Denmark	8:02.7	Q
3	Yevgeny Morozov; Viktor Shevchenko	Mikhail Prudnikov	Soviet Union	8:05.0	R
4	Iraklis Klangas; Nikos Nikolaou	Grigorios Emmanouil	Greece	8:24.1	R

=== First repechage ===
==== First repechage heat 1 ====
Rank	Rowers	Coxswain	Nation	Time	Notes
1	Veijo Mikkolainen; Toimi Pitkänen	Erkki Lyijynen	Finland	7:55.0	R
2	Walter Lüchinger; Alex Siebenhaar	Walter Ludin	Switzerland	7:56.8	
3	Iraklis Klangas; Nikos Nikolaou	Grigorios Emmanouil	Greece	8:12.9	
4	Mohamed Anwar; Ali Tawfik Youssif	Albert Selim El-Mankabadi	Egypt	8:21.4	

==== First repechage heat 2 ====
Rank	Rowers	Coxswain	Nation	Time	Notes
1	Yevgeny Morozov; Viktor Shevchenko	Mikhail Prudnikov	Soviet Union	8:03.0	R
2	Ove Nilsson; Ingemar Svensson	Lars-Erik Larsson	Sweden	8:03.8	
3	Francisco Furtado; Harry Mosé	João Maio	Brazil	8:05.5	

=== Semifinals ===
==== Semifinal 1 ====
Rank	Rowers	Coxswain	Nation	Time	Notes
1	Raymond Salles; Gaston Mercier	Bernard Malivoire	France	8:07.5	Q
2	Heinz Manchen; Helmut Heinhold	Helmut Noll	Germany	8:12.9	R
3	Svend Ove Pedersen; Poul Svendsen	Jørgen Frantzen	Denmark	8:18.7	R
4	László Halász; József Sátori	Róbert Zimonyi	Hungary	8:43.7	R

==== Semifinal 2 ====
Rank	Rowers	Coxswain	Nation	Time	Notes
1	Giuseppe Ramani; Aldo Tarlao	Luciano Marion	Italy	8:07.6	Q
2	Hippolyte Mattelé; Eugène Jacobs	Kamiel Van Dooren	Belgium	8:11.4	R
3	Czesław Lorenc; Romuald Thomas	Zdzisław Michalski	Poland	8:12.1	R
4	James Fifer; Duvall Hecht	James Beggs	United States	8:13.0	R

=== Second repechage ===
==== Second repechage heat 1 ====
Rank	Rowers	Coxswain	Nation	Time	Notes
1	Heinz Manchen; Helmut Heinhold	Helmut Noll	Germany	7:54.7	Q
2	James Fifer; Duvall Hecht	James Beggs	United States	7:55.5	
3	Yevgeny Morozov; Viktor Shevchenko	Mikhail Prudnikov	Soviet Union	8:08.4	

==== Second repechage heat 2 ====
Rank	Rowers	Coxswain	Nation	Time	Notes
1	Veijo Mikkolainen; Toimi Pitkänen	Erkki Lyijynen	Finland	8:01.8	Q
2	Hippolyte Mattelé; Eugène Jacobs	Kamiel Van Dooren	Belgium	8:03.7	
3	László Halász; József Sátori	Róbert Zimonyi	Hungary	8:16.6	

==== Second repechage heat 3 ====
Rank	Rowers	Coxswain	Nation	Time	Notes
1	Svend Ove Pedersen; Poul Svendsen	Jørgen Frantzen	Denmark	7:51.2	Q
2	Czesław Lorenc; Romuald Thomas	Zdzisław Michalski	Poland	8:00.9	

=== Final ===
Rank	Rowers	Coxswain	Nation	Time
1st place, gold medalist(s)	Raymond Salles; Gaston Mercier	Bernard Malivoire	France	8:28.6
2nd place, silver medalist(s)	Heinz Manchen; Helmut Heinhold	Helmut Noll	Germany	8:32.1
3rd place, bronze medalist(s)	Svend Ove Pedersen; Poul Svendsen	Jørgen Frantzen	Denmark	8:34.9
4	Giuseppe Ramani; Aldo Tarlao	Luciano Marion	Italy	8:38.4
5	Veijo Mikkolainen; Toimi Pitkänen	Erkki Lyijynen	Finland	8:40.8

== Results summary ==
Rank	Rowers	Coxswain	Nation	Quarterfinals	First repechage	Semifinals	Second repechage	Final
1st place, gold medalist(s)	Raymond Salles; Gaston Mercier	Bernard Malivoire	France	7:57.7	Bye	8:07.5	Bye	8:28.6
2nd place, silver medalist(s)	Heinz Manchen; Helmut Heinhold	Helmut Noll	Germany	8:02.3	Bye	8:12.9	7:54.7	8:32.1
3rd place, bronze medalist(s)	Svend Ove Pedersen; Poul Svendsen	Jørgen Frantzen	Denmark	8:02.7	Bye	8:18.7	7:51.2	8:34.9
4	Giuseppe Ramani; Aldo Tarlao	Luciano Marion	Italy	7:59.9	Bye	8:07.6	Bye	8:38.4
5	Veijo Mikkolainen; Toimi Pitkänen	Erkki Lyijynen	Finland	8:06.6	7:55.0	Bye	8:01.8	8:40.8
6	James Fifer; Duvall Hecht	James Beggs	United States	8:02.1	Bye	8:13.0	7:55.5	Did not advance
7	Czesław Lorenc; Romuald Thomas	Zdzisław Michalski	Poland	7:59.8	Bye	8:12.1	8:00.9	Did not advance
8	Hippolyte Mattelé; Eugène Jacobs	Kamiel Van Dooren	Belgium	8:05.3	Bye	8:11.4	8:03.7	Did not advance
9	Yevgeny Morozov; Viktor Shevchenko	Mikhail Prudnikov	Soviet Union	8:05.0	8:03.0	Bye	8:08.4	Did not advance
10	László Halász; József Sátori	Róbert Zimonyi	Hungary	8:04.1	Bye	8:43.7	8:16.6	Did not advance
11	Walter Lüchinger; Alex Siebenhaar	Walter Ludin	Switzerland	8:16.4	7:56.8	Did not advance		
12	Ove Nilsson; Ingemar Svensson	Lars-Erik Larsson	Sweden	8:07.6	8:03.8	Did not advance		
13	Francisco Furtado; Harry Mosé	João Maio	Brazil	8:19.0	8:05.5	Did not advance		
14	Iraklis Klangas; Nikos Nikolaou	Grigorios Emmanouil	Greece	8:24.1	8:12.9	Did not advance		
15	Mohamed Anwar; Ali Tawfik Youssif	Albert Selim El-Mankabadi	Egypt	8:29.3	8:21.4	Did not advance		
