= Brazil at the 1952 Summer Olympics =

- IOC code: BRA
- NOC: Brazilian Olympic Committee

in Helsinki
- Competitors: 97 (92 men and 5 women) in 14 sports
- Flag bearer: Mário Jorge da Fonseca
- Medals Ranked 24th: Gold 1 Silver 0 Bronze 2 Total 3

Summer Olympics appearances (overview)
- 1920; 1924; 1928; 1932; 1936; 1948; 1952; 1956; 1960; 1964; 1968; 1972; 1976; 1980; 1984; 1988; 1992; 1996; 2000; 2004; 2008; 2012; 2016; 2020; 2024

Brazil competed at the 1952 Summer Olympics in Helsinki, Finland. 97 competitors, 92 men and 5 women, took part in 51 events in 14 sports. Brazil won three medals at the 1952 Summer Olympics. Brazil won its first gold medal since its debut at the 1920 Summer Olympics.

Adhemar Ferreira da Silva won the men's triple jump. Adhemar broke the Olympic record four times and the world record twice in the event. Gold medal favorite and incumbent world recorder Adhemar broke the record for the first time in his second jump, with 16.12m. In the fifth, the Brazilian reached his best mark, 16.22m, a new world mark, 24 cm ahead of the Soviet Leonid Shcherbakov, who won the silver medal.

José Telles da Conceição won the bronze medal in men's high jump with a jump of 1,98 m; together with the gold medal won by Adhemar, those were the first medals won by Brazilians at Athletics in the Olympic Games.

Tetsuo Okamoto became the first Brazilian swimmer to win an Olympic medal, the bronze at the men's 1500 metre freestyle.

== Medalists ==
Medal	Name	Sport	Event	Date
Gold	Adhemar da Silva	Athletics	Men's triple jump	July 23
Bronze	José da Conceição	Athletics	Men's high jump	July 20
Bronze	Tetsuo Okamoto	Swimming	Men's 1500 metre freestyle	August 2

Medals by sport
Sport	1st place, gold medalist(s)	2nd place, silver medalist(s)	3rd place, bronze medalist(s)	Total
Athletics	1	0	1	2
Swimming	0	0	1	1
Total	1	0	2	3

Medals by gender
Gender	1st place, gold medalist(s)	2nd place, silver medalist(s)	3rd place, bronze medalist(s)	Total
Male	1	0	2	3
Female	0	0	0	0
Mixed	0	0	0	0
Total	1	0	2	3

== Athletics ==
Men
Track & road events

Athlete	Event	Heat		Quarterfinal		Semifinal		Final	
Athlete	Event	Result	Rank	Result	Rank	Result	Rank	Result	Rank
Wilson Carneiro	400 m hurdles	56.0	2 Q	59.4	6	did not advance			
Argemiro Roque	400 m	49.05	3	did not advance					
Argemiro Roque	800 m	1:54.1	5	did not advance					

Field events

Athlete	Event	Qualification		Final	
Athlete	Event	Distance	Position	Distance	Position
José da Conceição	High jump	1.87	10 Q	1.98	3rd place, bronze medalist(s)
José da Conceição	Triple jump	14.46	17	did not advance	
Geraldo de Oliveira	Long jump	6.71	23	did not advance	
Geraldo de Oliveira	Triple jump	14.64	10 Q	14.95	7
Ary de Sá	Long jump	7.24	6 Q	7.23	4
Adhemar da Silva	Triple jump	15.32	1 Q	16.22 WR	1st place, gold medalist(s)
Hélcio da Silva	Pole vault	3.60	25	did not advance	

Women
Track & road events

Athlete	Event	Heat		Quarterfinal		Semifinal		Final	
Athlete	Event	Result	Rank	Result	Rank	Result	Rank	Result	Rank
Deyse de Castro	200 m	25.0	3	did not advance					
Helena de Menezes	100 m	12.5	4	did not advance					
Wanda dos Santos	80 m hurdles	11.3	2 Q	—N/a		11.4	5	did not advance	

Field events

Athlete	Event	Qualification		Final	
Athlete	Event	Distance	Position	Distance	Position
Deyse de Castro	High jump	—N/a		1.50	12
Helena de Menezes	Long jump	5.33	24	did not advance	
Wanda dos Santos	Long jump	5.35	21	did not advance	

== Basketball ==
=== Main tournament ===
==== Group 3 ====
Team	Pld	W	L	PF	PA	PD	Pts
Argentina	3	3	0	239	196	+43	6
Brazil	3	2	1	184	179	+5	5
Philippines	3	1	2	192	221	−29	4
Canada	3	0	3	201	220	−19	3

Brazil	57–55	Canada

Brazil	71–52	Philippines

Argentina	72–56	Brazil

=== Quarterfinals ===
The top two teams in each quarterfinals advanced to the semifinals. The other two teams in each quarterfinals played in the fifth through eighth place classification.

==== Quarterfinals group B ====
Team	Pld	W	L	PF	PA	PD	Pts
United States	3	3	0	246	166	+80	6
Soviet Union	3	2	1	190	195	−5	5
Brazil	3	1	2	177	155	+22	4
Chile	3	0	3	159	256	−97	3

Brazil	75–44	Chile

Soviet Union	54–49	Brazil

United States	57–53	Brazil

=== Semifinals ===
31 July 1952
10:30

Brazil	59–44	France

Helsinki, Finland

=== Finals ===
2 August 1952
09:00

Chile	58–49	Brazil

Helsinki, Finland

=== Team roster ===
  - Algodão
  - Angelo Bonfietti
  - João Francisco Bráz
  - Mayr Facci
  - Mário Jorge
  - Ruy de Freitas
  - Sebastião Giménez
  - Godinho
  - Thales Monteiro
  - Almir
  - Alfredo da Motta
  - Raymundo Carvalho
  - Zé Luiz
- Head coach: Manoel Pitanga

== Boxing ==
Men

Athlete	Event	1 Round	2 Round	Quarterfinals	Semifinals	Final	
Athlete	Event	Opposition Result	Opposition Result	Opposition Result	Opposition Result	Opposition Result	Rank
Pedro Galasso	Featherweight	Toshihito Ishimaru (JPN); L 3–0	Lech Drogosz (POL); L 0–3	did not advance			
Celestino Pinto	Light-Welterweight	Salomon Carrizales (VEN); L 1–2	did not advance				
Alexandre Dib	Welterweight	Victor Jörgensen (DEN); L TKO-2	did not advance				
Paulo de Jesus Cavalheiro	Light-Middleweight	BYE	Sören Danielsson (SWE); W KO-3	Boris Tishin (URS); L 0–3	did not advance		5
Nelson de Paula Andrade	Middleweight	Mátyás Plachy (HUN); W 2–1	Vasile Tiță (ROU); L DSQ-2	did not advance			
Lucio Grotone	Light-Heavyweight	BYE	Bjarne Lingås (NOR); W 2–1	Antonio Pacenza (ARG); L 0–3	did not advance		5

== Diving ==
Men

Athlete	Event	Preliminary		Final			
Athlete	Event	Points	Rank	Points	Rank	Total	Rank
Richard Arie	10 m platform	59.40	28	did not advance			
Milton Busin	3 m springboard	67.97	8 Q	87.94	6	155.91	6

== Equestrian ==
=== Eventing ===
Athlete	Horse	Event	Dressage		Cross-country			Jumping			Total	
Athlete	Horse	Event	Dressage		Cross-country			Final			Total	
Athlete	Horse	Event	Penalties	Rank	Penalties	Total	Rank	Penalties	Total	Rank	Penalties	Rank
Pericles Cavalcanti	Destino	Individual	175.50	9	DSQ		AC	DNF		AC	DNF	AC

=== Show jumping ===
Athlete	Horse	Event	Round 1		Round 2		Final		
Athlete	Horse	Event	Penalties	Rank	Penalties	Rank	Total	Jump-off	Rank
Renyldo Ferreira	Bibelot	Individual	12.50	32	8.00	13	20.50	—N/a	23
Eloy de Menezes	Biguaj	Individual	4.00	2	4.00	4	8.00	8.00	4
Alvaro de Toledo	Eldorado	Individual	16.00	33	12.00	21	28.00	—N/a	31
Renyldo Ferreira; Eloy de Menezes; Alvaro de Toledo	See above	Team	28.50	4	28.00	5	56.50	—N/a	4

== Fencing ==
Five fencers, all men, represented Brazil in 1952.

Men's épée

- César Pekelman
- Darío Amaral
- Walter de Paula

Men's team épée

- Darío Amaral, César Pekelman, Walter de Paula, Helio Vieira

Men's sabre

- Etienne Molnar

== Football ==
Preliminary round

16 July 1952
19:00

Brazil	5–1	Netherlands
Humberto 25'; Larry 33' (pen.), 36'; Jansen 81'; Vavá 86'	Report	Van Roessel 15'

Kupittaa, Turku
Attendance: 9,685
Referee: Giorgio Bernardi (ITA)

First round

20 July 1952
19:00

Brazil	2–1	Luxembourg
Larry 42'; Humberto 49'	Report	Gales 86'

Kotkan Urheilukeskus, Kotka
Attendance: 6,776
Referee: Marijan Matancic (YUG)

Quarter-finals

24 July 1952
12:00

West Germany	4–2 (a.e.t.)	Brazil
Schröder 75', 96'; Klug 89'; Zeitler 120'	Report	Larry 12'; Zózimo 74'

Töölön Pallokenttä, Helsinki
Attendance: 11,451
Referee: Arthur Ellis (GBR)

== Modern pentathlon ==
Three male pentathletes represented Brazil in 1952.

Men

Athlete	Event	Riding (show jumping)	Fencing (épée one touch)	Shooting (25 m rapid-fire pistol)	Swimming (300 m freestyle)	Running (4000 m)	Total points	Final rank
Athlete	Event	Points	Points	Points	Points	Points	Total points	Final rank
Aloysio Borges	Men's	29	1	39	21	22	113	21
Eric Marques	Men's	43	18	30	15	28	135	29
Eduardo de Medeiros	Men's	22	23	5	2	26	80	10
Aloysio Borges; Eric Marques; Eduardo de Medeiros	Team	94	42	70	34	73	313	6

== Rowing ==
Brazil had three male rowers participate in one out of seven rowing events in 1952.

Men

Athlete	Event	Heats		Repechage		Semifinals		Final	
Athlete	Event	Time	Rank	Time	Rank	Time	Rank	Time	Rank
Francisco Furtado; Harry Mosé; João Maio	Coxed pair	8:19.0	4 R	8:05.5	3	did not advance			

== Sailing ==
Open

Athlete	Event	Race														Final rank	
Athlete	Event	1		2		3		4		5		6		7		Final rank	
Athlete	Event	Score	Rank	Score	Rank	Score	Rank	Score	Rank	Score	Rank	Score	Rank	Score	Rank	Score	Rank
Alfredo Jorge Ebling Bercht	Finn	19	269	9	594	~~21~~	~~226~~	2	1247	13	434	17	318	5	849	3711	9
Wolfgang Edgard Richter; Peter Mangels; Francisco Antonio Felici Italo Osoldi	Dragon	12	252	4	729	11	290	6	553	10	331	4	729	~~15~~	~~155~~	2884	7
Tacariju de Paula; Cid de Oliveira Nascimento	Star	11	382	4	821	13	309	~~19~~	~~144~~	12	344	15	247	15	247	2350	12

== Shooting ==
Eight shooters represented Brazil in 1952.

Men

Athlete	Event	Final	
Athlete	Event	Score	Rank
Manoel Braga	300 m rifle, three positions	962	27
Guilherme Cavalcanti	25 m rapid fire pistol	547	28
Antônio Guimarães	300 m rifle, three positions	932	31
Severino Moreira	50 m rifle, three positions	1122	27
Severino Moreira	50 m rifle, prone	398	8
Jorge de Oliveira	50 m pistol	522	19
Álvaro dos Santos Filho	50 m pistol	513	33
Pedro Simão	25 m rapid fire pistol	543	38
Harvey Dias Villela	50 m rifle, three positions	1113	32
Harvey Dias Villela	50 m rifle, prone	385	48

== Swimming ==
Men

Athlete	Event	Heat		Semifinal		Final	
Athlete	Event	Time	Rank	Time	Rank	Time	Rank
Aram Boghossian	100 metre freestyle	1:02.0	5	did not advance			
Ricardo Esperard	400 metre freestyle	5:09.5	6	did not advance			
João Gonçalves Filho	100 metre backstroke	1:09.7	3 Q	1:09.7	6	did not advance	
Adhemar Grijó Filho	200 metre breaststroke	2:47.6	4	did not advance			
Ilo da Fonseca	100 metre backstroke	1:09.9	3	did not advance			
Haroldo Lara	100 metre freestyle	1:01.2	5	did not advance			
Octavio Mobiglia	200 metre breaststroke	2:46.1	5	did not advance			
Tetsuo Okamoto	400 metre freestyle	4:46.1	1 Q	4:46.2	4	did not advance	
Tetsuo Okamoto	1500 metre freestyle	19:05.6	1 Q	—N/a		18:51.3	3rd place, bronze medalist(s)
Fernando Pavan	100 metre backstroke	1:09.1	3 Q	1:10.2	6	did not advance	
Sylvio dos Santos	1500 metre freestyle	19:26.8	4	did not advance			
Haroldo Lara; Sylvio dos Santos; Aram Boghossian; João Gonçalves Filho	4 x 200 metre freestyle	9:09.0	4	did not advance			

Women

Athlete	Event	Heat		Semifinal		Final	
Athlete	Event	Time	Rank	Time	Rank	Time	Rank
Piedade Coutinho-Tavares	400 metre freestyle	5:26.9	3 Q	5:28.5	7	did not advance	
Edith de Oliveira	100 metre backstroke	1:20.0	4	did not advance			

== Water polo ==
=== Qualifying round ===
1952-07-25

Spain	3–2	Brazil

1952-07-26

Brazil	6–2	Portugal

=== Preliminary round ===
==== Group D ====
Team	Pld	W	L	PF	PA	PD	Pts
Belgium	3	3	0	6	12	−6	6
Spain	3	2	1	4	13	−9	5
South Africa	3	1	2	2	10	−8	4
Brazil	3	0	3	0	7	−7	3

1952-07-27

Belgium	3–1	Brazil

1952-07-28

Spain	6–4	Brazil

1952-07-29

South Africa	9–2	Brazil

== Weightlifting ==
Men

Athlete	Event	Military Press		Snatch		Clean & Jerk		Total	Rank
Athlete	Event	Result	Rank	Result	Rank	Result	Rank	Total	Rank
Silvino Robin	82.5 kg	107.5	13	100.0	19	137.5	16	345.0	16
Bruno Barabani	90 kg	97.5	19	112.5	8	145.0	9	355.0	14
Valdemar de Silveira	+90 kg	112.5	12	110.0	9	140.0	11	362.5	12
