= Egypt at the 1952 Summer Olympics =

- IOC code: EGY
- NOC: Egyptian Olympic Committee

in Helsinki
- Competitors: 106 in 14 sports
- Flag bearer: Ahmed Fouad Nessim
- Medals Ranked 40th: Gold 0 Silver 0 Bronze 1 Total 1

Summer Olympics appearances (overview)
- 1912; 1920; 1924; 1928; 1932; 1936; 1948; 1952; 1956; 1960–1964; 1968; 1972; 1976; 1980; 1984; 1988; 1992; 1996; 2000; 2004; 2008; 2012; 2016; 2020; 2024

Other related appearances
- 1906 Intercalated Games –––– United Arab Republic (1960, 1964)

Egypt competed at the 1952 Summer Olympics in Helsinki, Finland. 106 competitors, all men, took part in 65 events in 14 sports.

== Medalists ==
=== Bronze ===
- Abdel Aaal Rashed – Wrestling, Greco-Roman Featherweight.

== Basketball ==
Men's Team Competition

- Qualification Round (Group C)
  - Defeated Turkey (64–52)
  - Lost to Canada (57–63)
  - Defeated Italy (66–62)
- Main Round (Group D)
  - Lost to France (64–92)
  - Lost to Chile (46–74)
  - Defeated Cuba (66–55) → did not advance, 10th place

== Diving ==
Men

Athlete	Event	Preliminary		Final	
Athlete	Event	Points	Rank	Points	Rank
Ahmed Kamel Aly	3 m springboard	62.95	17	Did not advance	
Ahmed Fahti Mohamed Hashad	3 m springboard	50.04	33	Did not advance	
Kamal Ali Hassan	3 m springboard	62.68	18	Did not advance	
Mohamed Fakhry Abbas	10 m platform	62.92	23	Did not advance	
Ahmed Kamel Aly	10 m platform	66.19	14	Did not advance	
Kamal Ali Hassan	10 m platform	61.03	25	Did not advance	

== Fencing ==
Eight fencers, all men, represented Egypt in 1952.

Men's foil

- Mahmoud Younes
- Salah Dessouki
- Mohamed Ali Riad

Men's team foil

- Salah Dessouki, Mohamed Ali Riad, Osman Abdel Hafeez, Mahmoud Younes, Mohamed Zulficar, Hassan Hosni Tawfik

Men's épée

- Mohamed Abdel Rahman

Men's team épée

- Osman Abdel Hafeez, Salah Dessouki, Mahmoud Younes, Mohamed Abdel Rahman

Men's sabre

- Mohamed Abdel Rahman
- Ahmed Abou-Shadi

Men's team sabre

- Mohamed Zulficar, Mohamed Abdel Rahman, Salah Dessouki, Mahmoud Younes, Ahmed Abou-Shadi

== Gymnastics ==
Men's Single Event

== Rowing ==
Egypt had eight male rowers participate in three out of seven rowing events in 1952.

Men's single sculls

- Hussein El-Alfy

Men's coxed pair

- Mohamed Anwar
- Ali Tawfik Youssif
- Albert Selim El-Mankabadi (cox)

Men's coxed four

- Ibrahim El-Attar
- Mohamed El-Sahrawi
- Mamdooh El-Attar
- Mohamed El-Sayed
- Albert Selim El-Mankabadi (cox)

== Shooting ==
Six shooters represented Egypt in 1952.

50 m pistol

- Antoine Shousha
- Mohamed Ahmed Aly

300 m rifle, three positions

- Ahmed Hamdy
- Saad El-Din El-Shorbagui

50 m rifle, three positions

- Ahmed Hamdi
- Antoine Shousha

50 m rifle, prone

- Antoine Shousha
- Ahmed Hamdi

Trap

- Seifollah Ghaleb
- Youssef Fares

== Swimming ==
Men

Ranks given are within the heat.

Athlete	Event	Heat		Semifinal		Final	
Athlete	Event	Time	Rank	Time	Rank	Time	Rank
Dorri El-Said	100 m freestyle	1:02.3	5	Did not advance			
Abdel Aziz El-Shafei	100 m freestyle	1:02.0	7	Did not advance			
Awad Moukhtar Halloudah	200 m breaststroke	2:50.5	7	Did not advance			
