= Rowing at the 1955 Mediterranean Games =

Rowing competition

- Location: Barcelona, Spain
- Dates: July 1955

The rowing events of the 1955 Mediterranean Games were held in Barcelona, Spain.

== Medalists ==
Event	Gold	Silver	Bronze
Single sculls	Henri Butel (FRA)	Tonguc Tursan (TUR)	Naguib Gamil (EGY)
Double sculls	France (FRA); Jacques Maillet; Raymond Salles	Spain (ESP)	No bronze awarded
Coxless pairs	France (FRA)	Spain (ESP)	No bronze awarded
Coxed pairs	France (FRA); Édouard Leguery; Claude Martin	Italy (ITA)	Egypt (EGY); Wagih El-Attar; Mohamed El-Sahrawi
Coxless fours	Italy (ITA); Attilio Cantoni; Giuseppe Moioli; Giovanni Zucchi	France (FRA)	Spain (ESP)
Coxed fours	Italy (ITA); Luciano Marion; Giuseppe Ramani; Aldo Tarlao	Greece (GRE); Ioannis Symbonis	France (FRA); Jean-Jacques Guissart
Eights	Italy (ITA); Alessandro Bardelli	Greece (GRE); Ioannis Symbonis	France (FRA); Pierre Blondiaux; Yves Delacour; René Guissart; René Lotti

== Medal table ==
Rank	Nation	Gold	Silver	Bronze	Total
1	France (FRA)	4	1	2	7
2	Italy (ITA)	3	1	0	4
3	Spain (ESP)	0	2	1	3
4	Greece (GRE)	0	2	0	2
5	Turkey (TUR)	0	1	0	1
6	Egypt (EGY)	0	0	2	2
Totals (6 entries)		7	7	5	19
