= Diving at the 1952 Summer Olympics – Men's 10 metre platform =

Men's 10 metre platform at the Games of the XV Olympiad
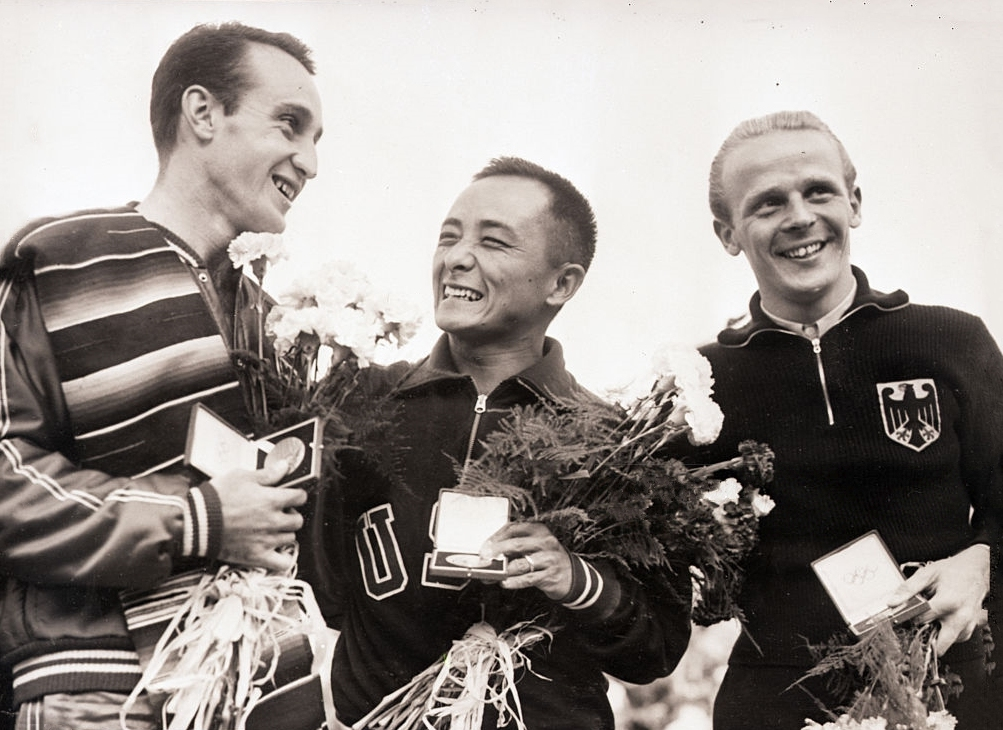
- Left-right: Capilla, Lee, Haase

Medalists
1st place, gold medalist(s)		Samuel Lee	United States
2nd place, silver medalist(s)		Joaquín Capilla	Mexico
3rd place, bronze medalist(s)		Günther Haase	Germany

The men's 10 metre platform, also reported as high diving, was one of four diving events on the Diving at the 1952 Summer Olympics programme.

The competition was split into two phases held on different days:

- Preliminary round (31 July) – Divers performed six voluntary dives of limited degrees of difficulty. The eight divers with the highest scores advanced to the final.
- Final (1 August) – Divers performed four voluntary dives without any limits of difficulty. The final score was the aggregate of the preliminary and final rounds' points.

== Results ==
Rank	Diver	Nation	Preliminary		Final		
Rank	Diver	Nation	Points	Rank	Points	Rank	Total
1st place, gold medalist(s)	Sammy Lee	United States	86.38	1	69.90	1	156.28
2nd place, silver medalist(s)	Joaquín Capilla	Mexico	78.46	2	66.75	2	145.21
3rd place, bronze medalist(s)	Günther Haase	Germany	75.41	3	65.90	3	141.31
4	John McCormack	United States	75.26	4	63.48	5	138.77
5	Alberto Capilla Perez	Mexico	72.95	5	63.49	4	136.44
6	Rodolfo Perea	Mexico	72.88	6	55.40	6	128.28
7	Aleksandr Bakatin	Soviet Union	71.86	7	55.00	8	126.86
8	Roman Brener	Soviet Union	71.01	8	55.30	7	126.31
9	John Calhoun	United States	70.22	9	did not advance		
10	Fritz Geyer	Germany	69.64	10	did not advance		
11	Thomas Christiansen	Denmark	69.10	11	did not advance		
12	Peter Heatly	Great Britain	67.78	12	did not advance		
13	Birger Kivelä	Finland	67.31	13	did not advance		
14	Ahmed Kamel Aly	Egypt	66.19	14	did not advance		
15	Jacob Gjerding	Denmark	65.88	15	did not advance		
16	Toivo Öhman	Sweden	65.37	16	did not advance		
17	Raymond Mulinghausen	France	65.02	17	did not advance		
17	Mikhail Chachba	Soviet Union	65.02	17	did not advance		
19	Anthony Turner	Great Britain	64.34	19	did not advance		
20	Werner Sobeck	Germany	64.27	20	did not advance		
21	Francis Murphy	Australia	64.10	21	did not advance		
22	Franz Worisch	Austria	63.02	22	did not advance		
23	Mohamed Fakhry Abbas	Egypt	62.92	23	did not advance		
24	Julius Janowsky	Austria	62.65	24	did not advance		
25	Kamal Ali Hassan	Egypt	61.03	25	did not advance		
26	Lamberto Mari	Italy	60.44	26	did not advance		
27	Kurt Liederer	Austria	60.21	27	did not advance		
28	Arie Richard Hanitzsch	Brazil	59.40	28	did not advance		
29	Katsuichi Mori	Japan	58.65	29	did not advance		
30	Yoav Raanan	Israel	58.15	30	did not advance		
31	Heinz Schaub	Switzerland	54.40	31	did not advance		

== Sources ==
- Diving at the 1952 Helsinki Summer Games: Men's Platform. sports-reference.com
- The Organising Committee for the XV Olympiad Helsinki 1952 (1955). "The Official Report of the Organising Committee for the XV Olympiad Helsinki 1952" (PDF). The Organising Committee for the XV Olympiad Helsinki 1952. pp. p. 585. Archived from the original (pdf) on 11 April 2008.
- Herman de Wael (26 January 2001). "Diving - men's platform (Helsinki 1952)".
