= Diving at the 1952 Summer Olympics – Men's 3 metre springboard =

Men's 3 metre springboard at the Games of the XV Olympiad
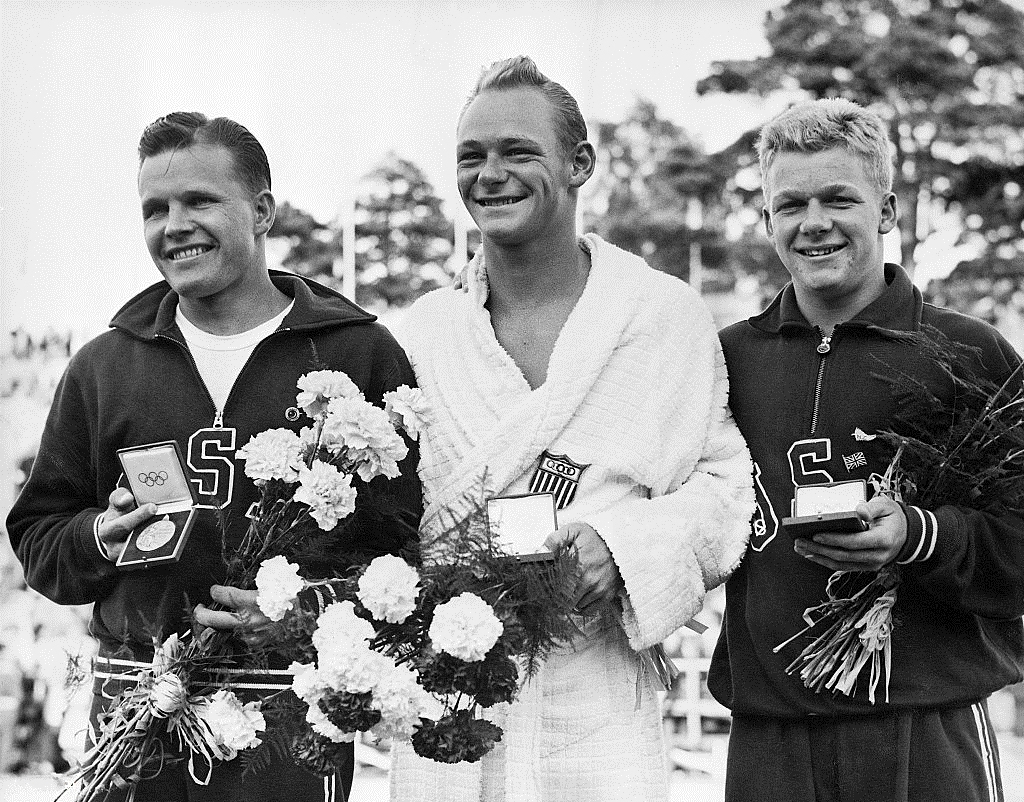
- Left-right: Anderson, Browning, Clotworthy

Medalists
1st place, gold medalist(s)		David Browning	United States
2nd place, silver medalist(s)		Miller Anderson	United States
3rd place, bronze medalist(s)		Bob Clotworthy	United States

The men's 3 metre springboard, also reported as springboard diving, was one of four diving events on the Diving at the 1952 Summer Olympics programme.

The competition was split into two phases on different days:

- Preliminary round (27 July) – Divers performed six voluntary dives of limited degrees of difficulty. The eight divers with the highest scores advanced to the final.
- Final (28 July) – Divers performed six voluntary dives without any limits of difficulty. The final score was the aggregate of the preliminary and final rounds' points.

== Results ==
Rank	Diver	Nation	Preliminary		Final		
Rank	Diver	Nation	Points	Rank	Points	Rank	Total
1st place, gold medalist(s)	David Browning	United States	89.59	1	115.70	1	205.29
2nd place, silver medalist(s)	Miller Anderson	United States	88.00	2	111.84	2	199.84
3rd place, bronze medalist(s)	Bob Clotworthy	United States	80.64	3	104.28	3	184.92
4	Joaquín Capilla	Mexico	79.42	4	98.91	4	178.33
5	Roman Brener	Soviet Union	69.37	7	96.26	5	165.63
6	Milton Busin	Brazil	67.97	8	87.94	6	155.91
7	Anthony Turner	Great Britain	71.36	5	80.54	7	151.90
8	Aleksey Zigalov	Soviet Union	71.25	6	80.06	8	151.31
9	Yoav Raanan	Israel	67.70	9	did not advance		
10	Franz Worisch	Austria	67.18	10	did not advance		
11	Hans Aderhold	Germany	67.09	11	did not advance		
12	Werner Sobeck	Germany	66.75	12	did not advance		
13	Gennady Udalov	Soviet Union	65.99	13	did not advance		
14	Helge Vasenius	Finland	65.41	14	did not advance		
15	Katsuichi Mori	Japan	65.23	15	did not advance		
16	Peter Heatly	Great Britain	63.37	16	did not advance		
17	Ahmed Kamel Aly	Egypt	62.95	17	did not advance		
18	Kamal Ali Hassan	Egypt	62.68	18	did not advance		
19	Rodolfo Perea	Mexico	62.36	19	did not advance		
20	Peter Elliott	Great Britain	61.85	20	did not advance		
20	Alberto Capilla	Mexico	61.85	20	did not advance		
22	Willem Welgemoed	South Africa	61.64	22	did not advance		
23	Frank Landqvist	Sweden	60.11	23	did not advance		
24	Ronald Faulds	Australia	59.90	24	did not advance		
25	Frank Gosling	Bermuda	59.57	25	did not advance		
26	Raymond Mulinghausen	France	59.52	26	did not advance		
27	Gunnar Johansson	Sweden	59.11	27	did not advance		
28	Mickey Johnson	Bermuda	58.70	28	did not advance		
29	Olavi Heinonen	Finland	58.06	29	did not advance		
30	Henri Goosen	France	57.79	30	did not advance		
31	Allan Smith	Ceylon	55.00	31	did not advance		
32	Lamberto Mari	Italy	54.42	32	did not advance		
33	Ahmed Fahti Mohamed Hashad	Egypt	50.04	33	did not advance		
34	Francis Murphy	Australia	48.42	34	did not advance		
35	Heinz Schaub	Switzerland	47.15	35	did not advance		
36	Eduardo Fereda	Venezuela	41.98	36	did not advance		

The divers were distracted by a photographer in a frogman suit who stationed himself in the pool to take pictures.

== Sources ==
- Diving at the 1952 Helsinki Summer Games: Men's Springboard. sports-reference.com
- The Organising Committee for the XV Olympiad Helsinki 1952 (1955). "The Official Report of the Organising Committee for the XV Olympiad Helsinki 1952" (PDF). The Organising Committee for the XV Olympiad Helsinki 1952. pp. p. 584. Archived from the original (pdf) on 11 April 2008.
- Herman de Wael (24 May 2001). "Diving - men's springboard (Helsinki 1952)".
