= Michael Worisch =

Austrian diver

Personal information
- Nationality: Austrian
- Born: 1 July 1958 (age 66); Vienna, Austria

Sport
- Sport: Diving

Michael Worisch (born 1 July 1958) is an Austrian diver. He competed in the men's 3 metre springboard event at the 1980 Summer Olympics. He is the son of Eva Pfarrhofer and Franz Worisch, brother of Alexandra Worisch and the uncle of Nadine Brandl.
