= Boxing at the 1952 Summer Olympics – Light middleweight =

Olympic boxing tournament

Light middleweight boxing at the Games of the XV Olympiad
- Venue: Messuhalli
- Dates: 29 July – 2 August 1952
- Competitors: 23 from 23 nations

Medalists
1st place, gold medalist(s)		László Papp	Hungary
2nd place, silver medalist(s)		Theunis van Schalkwyk	South Africa
3rd place, bronze medalist(s)		Boris Tishin	Soviet Union
3rd place, bronze medalist(s)		Eladio Herrera	Argentina

The men's light middleweight event was part of the boxing programme at the 1952 Summer Olympics. It was the inaugural Olympic event for the weight class and it allowed boxers of up to 71 kilograms to compete. The competition was held from 29 July to 2 August 1952. 23 boxers from 23 nations competed.

== Medalists ==
Gold	László Papp; Hungary
Silver	Theunis van Schalkwyk; South Africa
Bronze	Boris Tishin; Soviet Union
Bronze	Eladio Herrera; Argentina

== Results ==
Winner	NOC	Result	Loser	NOC
First Round (July 29)
John Tandrevold	Norway	BYE
Theunis Jacobus van Schalkwyk	South Africa	BYE
Ebbe Kops	Denmark	BYE
Erich Schöppner	Germany	BYE
Hans Büchi	Switzerland	BYE
Boris Tishin	Soviet Union	BYE
Jerzy Krawczyk	Poland	BYE
Paulo Cavalheiro	Brazil	BYE
Sören Danielsson	Sweden	BYE
Guido Mazzinghi	Italy	3 – 0	Bruno Matiussi	Luxembourg
Josef Hamberger	Austria	3 – 0	Willi Rammo	Saar
Eladio Oscar Herrera	Argentina	3 – 0	Ardashes Saginian	Iran
Petar Spasov	Bulgaria	2 – 1	Bernard Foster	Great Britain
Pentti Kontula	Finland	3 – 0	Neacşu Şerbu	Romania
Charles Chase	Canada	2 – 1	André Queillé	France
László Papp	Hungary	KO 2R	Ellsworth Webb	United States
Second Round (July 29 & 30)
Theunis Jacobus van Schalkwyk	South Africa	3 – 0	Ebbe Knud Kops	Denmark
Erich Schöppner	Germany	TKO 3R	Hans Büchi	Switzerland
Boris Tishin	Soviet Union	TKO 2R	Jerzy Krawczyk	Poland
Paulo de Jesus Cavalheiro	Brazil	KO 3R	Sören Danielsson	Sweden
Guido Mazzinghi	Italy	KO 1R	John Tandrevold	Norway
Eladio Oscar Herrera	Argentina	KO 3R	Josef Hamberger	Austria
Petar Stankoff Spassoff	Bulgaria	3 – 0	Pentti Olavi Kontula	Finland
László Papp	Hungary	KO 2R	Charles Chase	Canada
Third Round (July 31)
Eladio Oscar Herrera	Argentina	DSQ 3R	Guido Mazzinghi	Italy
Theunis Jacobus van Schalkwyk	South Africa	2 – 1	Erich Schöppner	Germany
László Papp	Hungary	3 – 0	Petar Stankoff Spassoff	Bulgaria
Boris Tishin	Soviet Union	3 – 0	Paulo de Jesus Cavalheiro	Brazil
Semi-final (August 1)
Theunis Jacobus van Schalkwyk	South Africa	3 – 0	Boris Tishin	Soviet Union
László Papp	Hungary	3 – 0	Eladio Oscar Herrera	Argentina
Final (August 2)
László Papp	Hungary	3 – 0	Theunis Jacobus van Schalkwyk	South Africa
