= Gaston Mercier =

French rower (1932–1974)

Personal information
- Born: Gaston Antoine Mercier; 5 June 1932 Paris, France
- Died: 4 July 1974 (aged 42) Bussières, Saône-et-Loire

Sport
- Sport: Rowing
- Club: Société d'Encouragement du Sport Nautique
Medal record
Men's rowing
Representing France
Gold medal – first place	1952 Helsinki	Coxed pair
Bronze medal – third place	1956 Melbourne	Coxless four
European Rowing Championships
Bronze medal – third place	1961 Prague	Eight

Gaston Antoine Mercier (5 June 1932 – 4 July 1974) was a French rower who competed in the 1952 Summer Olympics, in the 1956 Summer Olympics, and in the 1960 Summer Olympics.

He was born in Paris in 1932 and rowed for Société d'Encouragement du Sport Nautique based in Nogent-sur-Marne.

At the 1952 Summer Olympics, he was a crew member of the French boat that won the gold medal in the coxed pair event, with Raymond Salles and Bernard Malivoire as his team members. Four years later, he won the bronze medal with the French boat in the coxless four competition, teamed up with René Guissart, Yves Delacour, and Guy Guillabert. At the 1960 Games, he was part of the French boat that finished fourth in the eight event. At the 1961 European Rowing Championships, Mercier won a bronze medal with the eight.

Mercier died of a heart attack on 4 July 1974 while riding his bike in Bussières, Saône-et-Loire.
