= Prudnik (disambiguation) =

Prudnik is a city in south-west Poland.

Prudnik may also refer to:

- Prudnik County, county in Opole, Poland
- Prudnik (river), river of the Czech Republic and Poland
- Gmina Prudnik, gmina in Opole, Poland
- Pogoń Prudnik, Polish basketball team
- Pogoń Prudnik (football), Polish football club
- Prudnik Silesian dialect, Silesian dialect

== See also ==
- Prudnikov, Russian surname
