= Bakatin =

Bakatin (Russian: Бакатин) is a Russian masculine surname; its feminine counterpart is Bakatina. Notable people with the surname include:

- Aleksandr Bakatin (1922–1977), Russian diver;
- Vadim Bakatin (1937–2022), Soviet politician.
