= Ebbe Kops =

Danish boxer (1930–2021)

Personal information
- Full name: Ebbe Knud Kops
- Nationality: Danish
- Born: 5 February 1930; Pedersborg, Denmark
- Died: 9 February 2021 (aged 91); Ikast, Denmark

Sport
- Sport: Boxing

Ebbe Knud Kops (5 February 1930 – 9 February 2021) was a Danish boxer. As a member of Korsløkke BK he became four times national champion. He competed in the men's light middleweight event at the 1952 Summer Olympics where he lost from South African Theunis Jacobus van Schalkwyk in the second round with 0:3. He finished ninth overall.

He was the brother of Olympic boxer Poul Kops and the uncle of Olympic badminton player Erland Kops.
