= Sofia Beketova =

Soviet rower

Personal information
- Full name: Sofia Ivanovna Beketova
- Born: 1 June 1948 (age 78) Murom, Vladimir Oblast, Russian SFSR, Soviet Union
- Height: 1.82 m (6 ft 0 in)

Sport
- Sport: Rowing
- Club: Spartak Novgorod
- Coached by: Yevgeny Morozov
Medal record
Women's rowing
Representing the Soviet Union
World Rowing Championships
Silver medal – second place	1974 Lucerne	Eight
Silver medal – second place	1977 Amsterdam	Coxed four
European Rowing Championships
Gold medal – first place	1971 Copenhagen	Eight
Gold medal – first place	1973 Moscow	Eight

Sofia Ivanovna Beketova (later Shurkalova and then Bazylnikova, Russian: Софья Ивановна Бекетова (Шуркалова, Базыльникова), born 1 June 1948) is a retired Soviet rower who won European titles in the eight boat class in 1971 and 1973 and two silver medals at the world championships with the women's eight in 1974 and coxed four in 1977.

In 1967 Beketova graduated from the Murom Institute of Radio Engineering and moved to Novgorod, to work at a factory in Volna. There she started training by Yevgeny Morozov in rowing. She retired around 1977 and soon gave birth to twins. Years later, she resumed competing and won three world titles in the masters category.
