= Neacșu =

Neacșu is a Romanian surname and sometimes a male given name.

Notable people with the surname include:

- Ion Neacșu (1930–1988), Romanian footballer
- Ionelia Neacșu (married name Ionelia Zaharia), Romanian rower, competed in the 2008 Summer Olympics
- Lupu Neacșu, the author of Neacșu's letter
- Marilena Neacșu, Romanian artistic gymnast
- Mihaela Neacșu, Romanian middle-distance runner, competed in the 2008 Summer Olympics
- Nicolae Neacșu (1924–2002), Romani violinist
- Robert Neacșu, Romanian footballer

As a male given name, it was used by:

- Neacșu Șerbu (born 1928), Romanian boxer
