= Harold Wilson (rower) =

American Olympic rower (1903–1981)

Personal information
- Born: Harold C. Wilson; 15 January 1903 Washington Boro, Pennsylvania, US
- Died: 2 May 1981 (aged 78) Beach Haven, New Jersey, USA
- Height: 183 cm (6 ft 0 in)
- Weight: 79 kg (174 lb)

Sport
- Sport: Rowing
- Club: Pennsylvania Barge Club, Philadelphia
Medal record
Men's rowing
Representing the United States
Olympic Games
Bronze medal – third place	1924 Paris	Coxed pair

Harold Charles Wilson (15 January 1903 – 2 May 1981) was an American rower and Olympian. He was born in Washington Boro, Lancaster County, Pennsylvania, the oldest child of William B. Wilson and Henrietta A. Charles. By 1910, his family had moved to Philadelphia, Pennsylvania, where he grew up.

Wilson was a member of the U.S. Olympic Team, representing the United States at the Games of the VIII Olympiad held in Paris, France from 4 May through 27 July 1924. He competed in the paired oar shell with coxswain rowing event (crew).

The boat included Wilson (stroke), Leon Butler (bow seat), and Edward Jennings (cox). Rowing out of the Pennsylvania Barge Club of Philadelphia, the crew qualified for the U.S. Olympic team on 13 June 1924 at national trials held in Philadelphia. At the Olympic Games, the boat came in third, earning a bronze medal on 17 July 1924 at the Argenteuil Basin on the Seine.

After the 1924 Olympic Games, Wilson made his home in Philadelphia. He married Virginia E. Harris née Gessing (25 October 1902 – 21 March 1986) in Manhattan, New York City, NY on 27 June 1931. They moved to the Philadelphia suburb of Laverock in 1949. With his father, he owned and operated the Fairhill Laundry at 241 W. Allegheny Avenue in North Philadelphia.

Wilson retired and closed the business in 1969. In his retirement, he lived in Beach Haven, New Jersey, dying there in 1981 at age 78. He is interred in a family plot in the Lawnview Memorial Park, Rockledge, Pennsylvania.
