= Muhammad Anwar =

Muhammad Anwar may refer to:

- Muhammad Anwar (politician) (born 1974), Pakistani politician
- Muhammad Anwar (sociologist) (1945–2020), Pakistani sociologist
- Muhammad Anwar (wrestler) (born 1959), Pakistani wrestler
- Murder of Mohammad Anwar
- Mohammed Anwar, Pakistani Guantanamo Bay detainee
- Mohamed Anwar, Egyptian rower

== See also ==
- Muhammad Anwar Rahman (born 1996), Malaysian cricketer
