= Władysław Lemiszko =

Polish association football manager

- Born: 9 June 1911 Lemberg, Austria-Hungary
- Died: 17 April 1988 (aged 76) Tarnów, Poland
- Weight: 72 kg (159 lb; 11 st 5 lb)
- Played for: Czarni Lwów (1926–1936), Pogon Lwów (1936–1939), Dynamo Kiev & Lviv (1939–1941), Cracovia (1946)
- National team: Poland
- Playing career: 1926–1946

Wladyslaw Kazimierz Lemiszko (19 June 1911 – 17 April 1988) was a former Polish international Ice Hockey player, Olympian, and later football manager.

== Ice Hockey ==
=== Club ===
Growing up Lemiszko was a talented athlete excelling in; ice hockey, athletics, tennis, swimming, and skiing. It was ice hockey in which Lemiszko decided to play professionally, starting with Czarni Lwów. He was with Czarni for 10 years, finishing runners-up in the league in 1934, winning the league in 1935. He played for Pogon Lwów from 1936–39, before the outbreak of World War II halted the Polish league. During the war he played for Dynamo Kiev & Lviv, before playing professionally in Poland again for one final season in 1946 with Cracovia.

=== International ===
Lemiszko played 15 times for Poland and was involved with the Polish Winter Olympic team for 1936 being hosted in the German town of Garmisch-Partenkirchen. In the Olympics Poland were knocked out in the group stages finishing 3rd in their group.

== Football ==
Władysław Lemiszko
Managerial career
- Years: Team
- Okocimski KS Brzesko
- Pogoń Prudnik
- Grybovia Grybów
- Metal Tarnów
- Ogniwo Rzeszów
- Pafawag Wrocław
- JKS 1909 Jarosław
- Lechia Gdańsk
- Stal Mielec
- Stal Sanok
- Olimpia Poznań
- Karpaty Krosno
- GKS Błękitni Tarnów
- Stal Kraśnik
- Unia Racibórz

Lemiszko managed several football teams starting with Okocimski KS Brzesko, before managing; Pogoń Prudnik in 1948, Grybovia Grybów, Metal Tarnów, Ogniwo Rzeszów, Pafawag Wrocław, JKS 1909 Jarosław, Lechia Gdańsk in 1964, Stal Mielec, Stal Sanok, Olimpia Poznań, Karpaty Krosno, GKS Błękitni Tarnów, Stal Kraśnik, and finally Unia Racibórz.

== Honours ==
=== Ice Hockey ===
Czarni Lwów

- Ekstraklasa
  - Winners: 1935
  - Runners-up: 1934

Cracovia

- Ekstraklasa
  - Winners: 1946
