= Mikkolainen =

Surname list

Mikkolainen is a surname. Notable people with the surname include:

- Kalle Mikkolainen (1883–1928), Finnish gymnast
- Reijo Mikkolainen (born 1964), Finnish ice hockey player
- Veijo Mikkolainen (1924–2013), Finnish rower
