= Tandrevold =

Tandrevold is a Norwegian surname. Notable people with the surname include:

- Ingrid Landmark Tandrevold (born 1996), Norwegian biathlete
- John Tandrevold (1927–2013), Norwegian boxer
