= Charles Chase (boxer) =

Canadian boxer

Personal information
- Born: 18 February 1931; Montreal, Quebec, Canada
- Died: 25 February 1997 (aged 66); Montreal, Quebec, Canada

Sport
- Sport: Boxing

Charles Chase (18 February 1931 – 25 February 1997) was a Canadian boxer. He competed in the men's light middleweight event at the 1952 Summer Olympics.
