= John Calhoun (diver) =

American diver

Personal information
- Full name: John Collier Calhoun
- Born: May 19, 1925 Decatur, Illinois, U.S.
- Died: August 27, 2010 (aged 85)

Sport
- Sport: Diving

John Collier Calhoun (May 19, 1925 – August 27, 2010) was an American diver. He competed in the men's 10 metre platform event at the 1952 Summer Olympics.
