= James Beggs (rower) =

American rower

Personal information
- Born: January 6, 1924 Portland, Oregon, United States
- Died: May 4, 2011 (aged 87) Watsonville, California, United States

Sport
- Sport: Rowing

James Beggs (January 6, 1924 – May 4, 2011) was an American rower. He competed in the men's coxed pair event at the 1952 Summer Olympics.
