= Ove Nilsson (rower) =

Swedish rower

Personal information
- Nationality: Swedish
- Born: 13 November 1928; Falkenberg, Sweden
- Died: 13 February 2013 (aged 84)

Sport
- Sport: Rowing

Ove Nilsson (13 November 1928 – 13 February 2013) was a Swedish rower. He competed in the men's coxed pair event at the 1952 Summer Olympics.
