= Hippolyte Mattelé =

Belgian rower

Personal information
- Born: Hippolyte Victor Roger Mattelé; 10 August 1921 Antwerp, Belgium
- Died: 2006 (aged 84–85)

Sport
- Sport: Rowing
Medal record
Men's rowing
Representing Belgium
European Rowing Championships
Bronze medal – third place	1950 Milan	Coxed pair

Hippolyte Victor Roger Mattelé (10 August 1921 – 2006) was a Belgian rower. He competed at the 1952 Summer Olympics in Helsinki with the men's coxed pair where they were eliminated in the semi-final repêchage.
