= Gunnar Johansson (diver) =

Swedish diver (1924–1997)

Personal information
- Full name: Gunnar Ernst Ferdinand Johansson
- Nationality: Swedish
- Born: 21 June 1924 Bromma, Stockholm, Sweden
- Died: 14 March 1997 (aged 72) Enskededalen, Stockholm, Sweden

Sport
- Sport: Diving

Gunnar Ernst Ferdinand Johansson (21 June 1924 – 14 March 1997) was a Swedish diver. He competed in the men's 3 metre springboard event at the 1952 Summer Olympics.

Johansson represented Stockholms KK.
