= László Halász (rower) =

Hungarian rower

Personal information
- Nationality: Hungarian
- Born: 12 February 1930; Budapest, Hungary
- Died: 1997 (aged 66–67); Budapest, Hungary

Sport
- Sport: Rowing

László Halász (12 February 1930 – 1997) was a Hungarian rower. He competed in the men's coxed pair event at the 1952 Summer Olympics.
