= Romuald Thomas =

Polish rower

Personal information
- Nationality: Polish
- Born: 18 June 1922; Kojry, Poland
- Died: 23 January 1998 (aged 75); Carmichael, California, United States

Sport
- Sport: Rowing

Romuald Thomas (18 June 1922 – 23 January 1998) was a Polish rower. He competed in the men's coxed pair event at the 1952 Summer Olympics.
