= Erkki Lyijynen =

Finnish rower

Personal information
- Nationality: Finnish
- Born: 16 March 1925; Lappeenranta, Finland
- Died: 24 January 2015 (aged 89); Lappeenranta, Finland

Sport
- Sport: Rowing

Erkki Lyijynen (16 March 1925 – 24 January 2015) was a Finnish rower. He competed in the men's coxed pair event at the 1952 Summer Olympics.
