= Prudnikov =

Prudnikov (Russian: Пру́дников) or Prudnikoff is a Russian male surname originating from the word prudnik meaning worker at a water mill. Its feminine counterpart is Prudnikova. It may refer to

- Aleksandr Prudnikov (born 1989), Russian footballer
- Aleksey Prudnikov (born 1960), Russian football coach and former footballer
- Anatoli Prudnikov (1927–1999), Russian mathematician
- Dmitri Prudnikov (born 1988), Russian futsal player
- Djordje Prudnikov (1939–2017), Russian-Serbian artist
- Mikhail Prudnikov (born 1928), Russian Olympic rower
- Sergey Prudnikov (born 1985), Russian Olympic bobsledder
- Svetlana Prudnikova (born 1967), Russian chess player
- Tatyana Prudnikova (born 1954), Soviet Olympic swimmer
