= Eladio Herrera (boxer) =

Argentine boxer (1930–2014)

Olympic medal record

Men's Boxing

Representing Argentina
Bronze medal – third place	1952 Helsinki	Light middleweight

Eladio Óscar Herrera (February 9, 1930 – November 25, 2014) was an Argentine boxer. He competed at the 1948 Summer Olympics and the 1952 Summer Olympics.

== Amateur career ==
Herrera won a bronze medal in the 1952 Summer Olympics, in Helsinki.

== Professional career ==
Herrera fought once in 1953 and once in 1955, retiring with a career record of 1-1.
