= André Queillé =

French boxer (1931–2018)

Personal information
- Nationality: French
- Born: 5 October 1931; Dijon, France
- Died: 13 December 2018 (aged 87); La Ciotat, France

Sport
- Sport: Boxing

André Camille Jean Queillé (5 October 1931 – 13 December 2018) was a French boxer. He competed in the men's light middleweight event at the 1952 Summer Olympics.
