= Ingemar Svensson =

Swedish rower

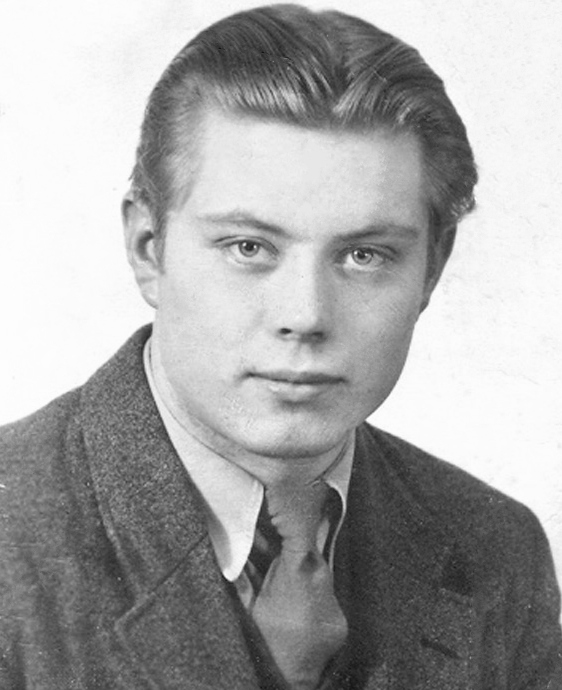

Personal information
- Born: 21 March 1929 Falkenberg, Sweden
- Died: 6 April 2004 (aged 75) Falkenberg, Sweden

Sport
- Sport: Rowing
- Club: Falkenbergs RK

Karl Ingemar Svensson (21 March 1929 – 6 April 2004) was a Swedish rower. He competed at the 1952 Summer Olympics in the coxed pairs, together with Ove Nilsson and Lars-Erik Larsson, but failed to reach the final. His son Hans also became an Olympic rower.
