= Kamiel Van Dooren =

Belgian rower

Personal information
- Nationality: Belgian
- Born: 25 October 1936 (age 88); Antwerp, Belgium

Sport
- Sport: Rowing

Kamiel Van Dooren (born 25 October 1936) is a Belgian rower. He competed in the men's coxed pair event at the 1952 Summer Olympics.
