= Julius Janowsky =

Austrian diver

Personal information
- Nationality: Austrian
- Born: 18 August 1930
- Died: 17 March 1995 (aged 64)

Sport
- Sport: Diving

Julius Janowsky (18 August 1930 – 17 March 1995) was an Austrian diver. He competed in the men's 10 metre platform event at the 1952 Summer Olympics.
