= Günther Haase =

German diver

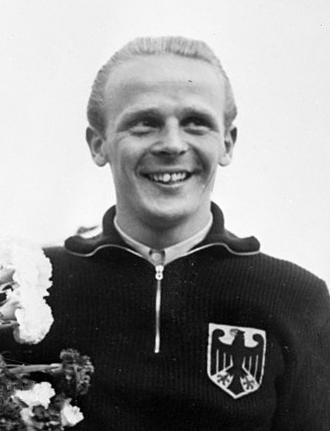
- Haase at the 1952 Olympics

Personal information
- Born: 11 June 1925 (age 101) Hamburg, Weimar Republic

Sport
- Sport: Diving
- Club: SV Neptun Lüdenscheid
Medal record
Representing Germany
Olympic Games
| Bronze medal – third place | 1952 Helsinki | 10 m platform |
European Championships
| Gold medal – first place | 1950 Vienna | 10 m platform |

Günther Haase (born 11 June 1925) is a German retired diver. Competing in the 10 m platform he won a gold medal at the 1950 European Championships and a bronze at the 1952 Olympics. He is the oldest still living medal winner at Olympic Games. He was married to the national diving champion Paula Tatarek.
