= Poul Svendsen =

Danish rower (1927–2024)

Olympic medal record

Men's rowing
Bronze medal – third place	1952 Helsinki	Coxed pair

Poul Verner Svendsen (21 April 1927 – 2 January 2024) was a Danish rower who competed in the 1952 Summer Olympics. Svendsen was born in Copenhagen in 1927. In 1952, he was, together with Svend Ove Pedersen and Jørgen Frantzen, a crew member of the Danish boat which won the bronze medal in the coxed pair event. Svendsen died on 2 January 2024, at the age of 96.
