= Willem Welgemoed =

South African diver

Willie Welgemoed
Personal information
- Full name: Willem Jacobus Welgemoed
- Nationality: South African
- Born: 30 September 1925 Bloemfontein, Union of South Africa
- Died: 11 July 1992 (aged 66) Pretoria, South Africa

Sport
- Sport: Diving

Willem Jacobus "Willie" Welgemoed (30 September 1925 – 11 July 1992) was a South African diver. He competed in the men's 3 metre springboard event at the 1952 Summer Olympics.
