= Henri Goosen =

French diver (1926–2011)

Personal information
- Nationality: French
- Born: 14 July 1926 Paris, France
- Died: 27 January 2011 (aged 84) Orléans, France

Sport
- Sport: Diving

Henri Goosen (14 July 1926 – 27 January 2011) was a French diver. He competed in the men's 3 metre springboard event at the 1952 Summer Olympics.
