= Olavi Heinonen =

Finnish diver (1921–1992)

Personal information
- Full name: Olavi Mikael Heinonen
- Nationality: Finnish
- Born: 20 September 1921 Helsinki, Finland
- Died: 19 May 1992 (aged 70) Helsinki, Finland

Sport
- Sport: Diving

Olavi Mikael Heinonen (20 September 1921 – 19 May 1992) was a Finnish diver. He competed in the men's 3 metre springboard event at the 1952 Summer Olympics.
