= Ardashes Saginian =

Iranian boxer

Personal information
- Nationality: Iranian
- Born: 6 April 1928
- Died: 19 July 2009 (aged 81); Glendale, California, United States

Sport
- Sport: Boxing

Ardashes Saginian (16 June 1928 – 19 July 2009) was an Iranian boxer. He competed in the men's light middleweight event at the 1952 Summer Olympics.
