= Allan Smith (diver) =

Sri Lankan diver (1929–2023)

Personal information
- Full name: Norman Allan Smith
- Nationality: Sri Lankan
- Born: 25 March 1929
- Died: 12 August 2023 (aged 94)

Sport
- Sport: Diving

Norman Allan Smith (25 March 1929 – 12 August 2023) was a Sri Lankan diver. He competed in the men's 3 metre springboard event at the 1952 Summer Olympics.

Smith died on 12 August 2023, at the age of 94.
