= Bruno Mattiussi =

Luxembourgish boxer

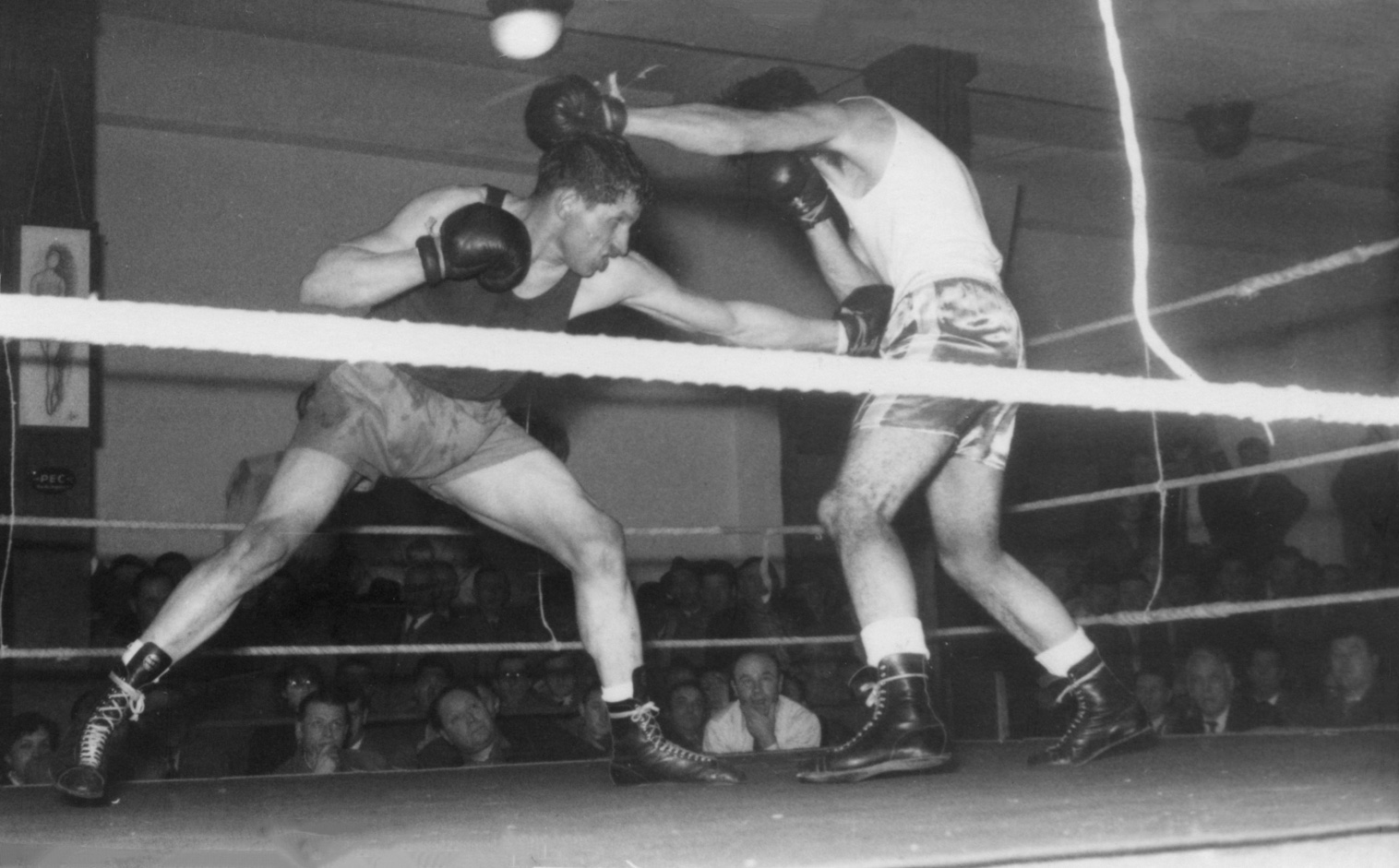

Personal information
- Nationality: Luxembourgish
- Born: 26 August 1926 Dudelange, Luxembourg
- Died: 23 June 1981 (aged 54) Esch-sur-Alzette, Luxembourg

Sport
- Sport: Boxing

Bruno Mattiussi (26 August 1926 – 23 June 1981) was a Luxembourgish boxer. He competed in the men's light middleweight event at the 1952 Summer Olympics.
