= Frank Landqvist =

Swedish diver

Personal information
- Full name: Frank Lars Göran Landqvist
- Nationality: Swedish
- Born: 2 October 1934 Kristinehamn, Sweden
- Died: 7 January 1983 (aged 48) Karlskoga, Sweden

Sport
- Sport: Diving

Frank Lars Göran Landqvist (2 October 1934 – 7 January 1983) was a Swedish diver. He competed in the men's 3 metre springboard event at the 1952 Summer Olympics.
