= Jacob Gjerding =

Danish diver

Personal information
- Full name: Jacob Christian Lunøe Gjerding
- Nationality: Danish
- Born: 17 June 1929 Vejle, Denmark
- Died: 21 February 1994 (aged 64) Frederiksberg, Denmark

Sport
- Sport: Diving

Jacob Christian Lunøe Gjerding (17 June 1929 – 21 February 1994) was a Danish diver. He competed in the men's 10 metre platform event at the 1952 Summer Olympics.
