= Alphonse De Wette =

Belgian rower

Alphonse Dewette
Personal information
- Born: 5 October 1902 Ghent

Sport
- Sport: Rowing
- Club: KRSG, Gent
Medal record
Men's rowing
Representing Belgium
European Rowing Championships
| Bronze medal – third place | 1926 Lucerne | Eight |
| Bronze medal – third place | 1927 Como | Coxless four |

Alphonse De Wette (born 5 October 1902, date of death unknown) was a Belgian rower. He competed at the 1924 Summer Olympics in Paris with the men's coxed pair where they were eliminated in round one. He also competed at the 1928 Summer Olympics.
