= Rowing at the 1924 Summer Olympics – Men's coxed pair =

Olympic rowing event

Men's coxed pairs at the Games of the VIII Olympiad
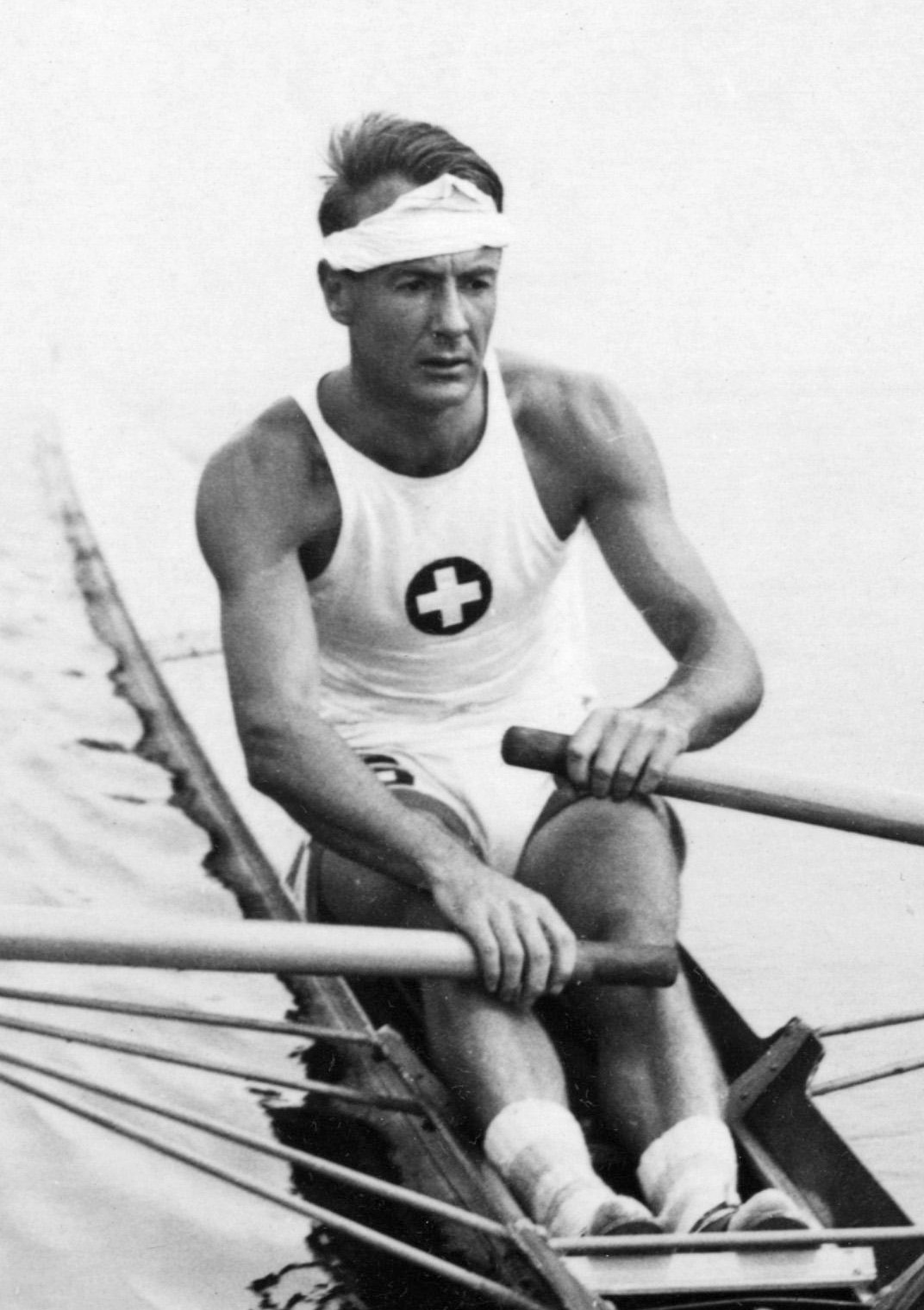
- Édouard Candeveau, a member of the gold medal boat (shown in 1928 in single scull)
- Venue: Seine
- Dates: 14–17 July 1924
- Competitors: 15 from 5 nations
- Winning time: 8:39.0

Medalists
1st place, gold medalist(s)		Édouard Candeveau; Alfred Felber; Émile Lachapelle (cox); Switzerland
2nd place, silver medalist(s)		Ercole Olgeni; Giovanni Scatturin; Gino Sopracordevole (cox); Italy
3rd place, bronze medalist(s)		Leon Butler; Harold Wilson; Edward Jennings (cox); United States

The men's coxed pair event was part of the rowing programme at the 1924 Summer Olympics. The competition, the third appearance of the event, was held from 14 to 17 July 1924 on the river Seine. Five teams, each from a different nation, competed, for a total of 15 rowers and coxswains. The event was won by Switzerland, with rowers Édouard Candeveau and Alfred Felber and coxswain Émile Lachapelle. The two Swiss rowers had earned bronze in 1920 with a different cox. Defending champion Italian rowers Ercole Olgeni and Giovanni Scatturin took silver, this time with Gino Sopracordevole as their cox. Candeveau, Felber, Olgeni, and Scatturin were the first four men with multiple medals in the event. The United States' debut in the event netted a bronze medal for rowers Leon Butler and Harold Wilson and cox Edward Jennings.

== Background ==
This was the third appearance of the event. Rowing had been on the programme in 1896 but was cancelled due to bad weather. The men's coxed pair was one of the original four events in 1900, but was not held in 1904, 1908, or 1912. It returned to the programme after World War I and was held every Games from 1924 to 1992, when it (along with the men's coxed four) was replaced with the men's lightweight double sculls and men's lightweight coxless four.

Two of the four rower pairs from 1920 returned, though both had switched coxswains since the Antwerp Games: gold medalists Ercole Olgeni and Giovanni Scatturin of Italy and bronze medalists Édouard Candeveau and Alfred Felber of Switzerland. The Swiss rowers, with new cox Émile Lachapelle, had won the 1922 and 1923 European championships.

The United States made its debut in the event. Belgium and France each made their third appearance, having previously competed in both prior editions in 1900 and 1920.

== Competition format ==
The coxed pair event featured three-person boats, with two rowers and a coxswain. It was a sweep rowing event, with the rowers each having one oar (and thus each rowing on one side). The competition featured two rounds (semifinals and a final). There were two semifinals, each with 2 or 3 boats; the top two boats in each advanced to the final. As there were only five boats, the semifinal round eliminated only one team. The four-boat final determined the medals. The course used the 2000 metres distance that became the Olympic standard in 1912.

== Schedule ==
Date	Time	Round
Tuesday, 15 July 1924		Semifinals
Thursday, 17 July 1924		Final

== Results ==
=== Semifinals ===
The top two boats in each semifinal advanced to the final, meaning only one team was eliminated.

==== Semifinal 1 ====
Rank	Rowers	Coxswain	Nation	Time	Notes
1	Eugène Constant; Raymond Talleux	Marcel Lepan	France	7:36.6	Q
2	Leon Butler; Harold Wilson	Edward Jennings	United States	Unknown	Q
3	Alphonse Dewette; Eugène Gabriels	Marcel Wauters	Belgium	Unknown	

==== Semifinal 2 ====
Rank	Rowers	Coxswain	Nation	Time	Notes
1	Édouard Candeveau; Alfred Felber	Émile Lachapelle	Switzerland	7:49.6	Q
2	Ercole Olgeni; Giovanni Scatturin	Gino Sopracordevole	Italy	Unknown	Q

=== Final ===
Rank	Rowers	Coxswain	Nation	Time
1st place, gold medalist(s)	Édouard Candeveau; Alfred Felber	Émile Lachapelle	Switzerland	8:39.0
2nd place, silver medalist(s)	Ercole Olgeni; Giovanni Scatturin	Gino Sopracordevole	Italy	8:39.1
3rd place, bronze medalist(s)	Leon Butler; Harold Wilson	Edward Jennings	United States	Unknown
4	Eugène Constant; Raymond Talleux	Marcel Lepan	France	Unknown

== Results summary ==
Rank	Rowers	Coxswain	Nation	Semifinals	Final
1st place, gold medalist(s)	Édouard Candeveau; Alfred Felber	Émile Lachapelle	Switzerland	7:49.6	8:39.0
2nd place, silver medalist(s)	Ercole Olgeni; Giovanni Scatturin	Gino Sopracordevole	Italy	Unknown	8:39.1
3rd place, bronze medalist(s)	Leon Butler; Harold Wilson	Edward Jennings	United States	Unknown	Unknown
4	Eugène Constant; Raymond Talleux	Marcel Lepan	France	7:36.6	Unknown
5	Alphonse Dewette; Eugène Gabriels	Marcel Wauters	Belgium	Unknown	Did not advance

== Sources ==
- Evans, Hilary; Gjerde, Arild; Heijmans, Jeroen; Mallon, Bill; et al. "Rowing at the 1924 Paris Summer Games: Men's Coxed Pairs". Olympics at Sports-Reference.com. Sports Reference LLC. Archived from the original on 18 April 2020.
- Wudarski, Pawel (1999). "Wyniki Igrzysk Olimpijskich" (in Polish).
