= Alex Siebenhaar =

Swiss rower (1927–2022)

Personal information
- Born: Alexander Siebenhaar; 18 September 1927
- Died: 22 February 2022 (aged 94)

Sport
- Sport: Rowing
Medal record
Men's rowing
Representing Switzerland
European Rowing Championships
Silver medal – second place	1950 Milan	Coxed pair
Silver medal – second place	1951 Mâcon	Coxed pair

Alexander Siebenhaar (18 September 1927 – 22 February 2022) was a Swiss rower. He competed at the 1952 Summer Olympics in Helsinki with the men's coxed pair where they were eliminated in the round one repêchage.
