= Willi Rammo =

German boxer

Personal information
- Nationality: German
- Born: 5 July 1925; Spiesen, Germany
- Died: 1 August 2009 (aged 84); Neunkirchen, Germany

Sport
- Sport: Boxing

Wilhelm Rammo (5 July 1925 – 1 August 2009) was a German boxer. He competed in the men's light middleweight event at the 1952 Summer Olympics, representing Saar.
