= Fritz Geyer =

German diver

Personal information
- Full name: Friedrich Geyer
- Nationality: German
- Born: 28 June 1925 Erding, Germany

Sport
- Sport: Diving

Fritz Geyer (born 28 June 1925) was a German diver. He competed in the men's 10 metre platform event at the 1952 Summer Olympics.
