= Eugène Jacobs =

Belgian rower (born 1926)

Personal information
- Born: 28 May 1926 Antwerp, Belgium
- Died: 26 June 2009 (aged 83)

Sport
- Sport: Rowing
Medal record
Men's rowing
Representing Belgium
European Rowing Championships
Bronze medal – third place	1950 Milan	Coxed pair

Eugène Jacobs (28 May 1926 – 26 June 2009) was a Belgian rower. He competed at the 1952 Summer Olympics in Helsinki with the men's coxed pair where they were eliminated in the semi-final repêchage.
