= John McCormack (diver) =

American diver

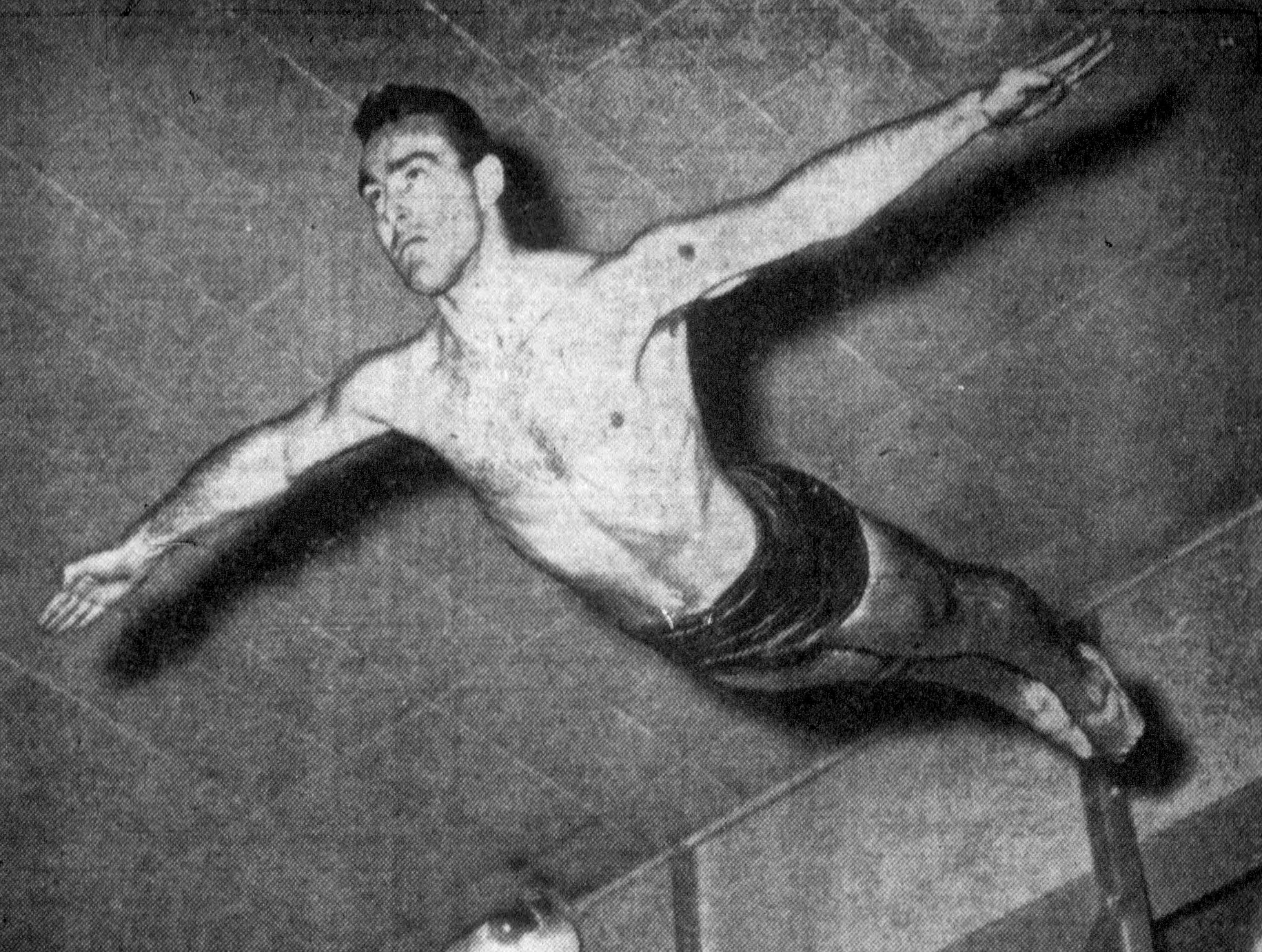
- McCormack, circa 1949

Personal information
- Full name: John William McCormack
- Born: August 15, 1925 San Francisco, California, U.S.
- Died: November 11, 1987 (aged 62) San Francisco, California, U.S.

Sport
- Sport: Diving

John William McCormack (August 15, 1925 – November 11, 1987) was an American diver. He competed in the men's 10 metre platform event at the 1952 Summer Olympics.
