= Jerzy Krawczyk =

Polish boxer

Personal information
- Nationality: Polish
- Born: 17 November 1928 Łódź, Poland
- Died: 25 December 2008 (aged 80) Gdańsk, Poland

Sport
- Sport: Boxing

Jerzy Krawczyk (17 November 1928 – 25 December 2008) was a Polish boxer. He competed in the men's light middleweight event at the 1952 Summer Olympics.
