= Kurt Liederer =

Austrian diver (1927–2020)

Personal information
- Nationality: Austrian
- Born: 18 May 1927
- Died: 15 May 2020 (aged 92)

Sport
- Sport: Diving

Kurt Liederer (18 May 1927 – 15 May 2020) was an Austrian diver. He competed in the men's 10 metre platform event at the 1952 Summer Olympics.
