= Allsport =

Sports photography agency

The Allsport photography agency was started in 1968 by sports photographer Tony Duffy. It grew to become arguably the most highly respected sport photo agency in the world, and its photographers won numerous awards until acquisition by Getty Images in 1998.

Until 1968, Tony Duffy was an accountant and part-time photographer who shot track and field athletics in his spare time. He paid for himself to go to the 1968 Olympic Games in Mexico City.

At the 1968 Olympic Games, Bob Beamon broke the World Record in the Long Jump with a leap of 8m 90 or 29 ft 2½ inches. Crouched at the end of the long jump pit was Tony Duffy. Duffy took a picture which, through wide re-production, is perhaps the definitive shot of this remarkable jump. The Allsport agency was founded on the strength of his photograph of Beamon.

== 1970s ==
Tony Duffy was joined in the 1970s by photographers John Starr, Don Morley who was chief photographer of Sportsworld magazine and the official photographer for the British Olympic Association, and in 1971, Steve Powell. Powell would go on to become group managing director. Morley specialised in shooting motorsport, specifically motorbikes, and Starr took studio shots. Adrian Murrell joined in the mid seventies and became the agency's cricket specialist. Duffy's innovative feature 'Sport and the Body' brought his name and the name of the agency to a wider audience when published by the Sunday Times in 1973. The use of naked sports stars caused uproar and brought nationwide publicity.

== 1980s ==
The Allsport agency experienced tremendous growth throughout the 1980s, and in 1983 Tony Duffy moved to California to open the Allsport USA offices in Santa Monica. In 1985 he was joined by Mike Powell, the younger brother of Steve. David Cannon joined in 1982 as a general sport photographer specialising in football and golf. With Duffy working stateside, Bob Martin assumed the role of leading athletics photographer in Europe. Younger photographers such as Mike King, Simon Bruty, Chris Cole, Gray Mortimore, David Leah, Jonathan Daniel and Pascal Rondeau continued to create stunning and thought-provoking sport images.

In 1988 Allsport was appointed as official photographer to the International Olympic Committee. The first book in the Visions of Sport series was published to celebrate 20 years of Allsport, and included all of the famous images shot by Allsport photographers in its first 20 years.

== 1990s ==
In 1998 Allsport was acquired by Getty Images.
