= Viktor Shevchenko =

Soviet rower (born 1931)

Personal information
- Born: 1931

Sport
- Sport: Rowing

Viktor Shevchenko (Russian: Виктор Шевченко; born 1931) is a Russian rower who represented the Soviet Union. He competed at the 1952 Summer Olympics in Helsinki with the men's coxed pair where they were eliminated in the semi-final repêchage.
