= Eugène Gabriels =

Belgian rower

Personal information
- Nationality: Belgian
- Born: 27 November 1895 Ghent, Belgium
- Died: 28 July 1969 (aged 73) Ghent, Belgium

Sport
- Sport: Rowing

Achievements and titles
- Olympic finals: 1924 Summer Olympics

Eugène Gabriels (27 November 1895 – 28 July 1969) was a Belgian rower. He competed in the men's coxed pair event at the 1924 Summer Olympics.
