= Josef Hamberger =

Austrian boxer (1930–1988)

Personal information
- Nationality: Austrian
- Born: 19 July 1930
- Died: 28 August 1988 (aged 58)

Sport
- Sport: Boxing

Josef Hamberger (19 July 1930 – 28 August 1988) was an Austrian boxer. He competed in the men's light middleweight event at the 1952 Summer Olympics.

Hamberger died on 28 August 1988, at the age of 58.
