= Erich Schöppner =

German boxer

Personal information
- Nationality: German
- Born: 25 June 1932; Witten, Germany
- Died: 12 September 2005 (aged 73); Dortmund, Germany

Sport
- Sport: Boxing

Erich Schöppner (25 June 1932 – 12 September 2005) was a German boxer. He competed in the men's light middleweight event at the 1952 Summer Olympics.
