= Birger Kivelä =

Finnish diver

Personal information
- Born: December 20, 1920; Helsinki, Finland
- Died: September 27, 2013 (aged 92); Helsinki, Finland

Sport
- Sport: Diving

Jarl Birger Kivelä (20 December 1920 – 27 September 2013) was a Finnish diver who competed at the 1952 Summer Olympics in Helsinki, where he finished 13th in a field of 31 competitors in the men's 10 metre platform event. He was born in Helsinki and served as the President of the Finnish Swimming Association in the early 1970s. From the mid-1990s until his death he competed in master's level diving championships.
