= Pentti Kontula =

Finnish boxer

Personal information
- Nationality: Finnish
- Born: 4 September 1930; Lohja, Finland
- Died: 13 June 1987 (aged 56); Helsinki, Finland

Sport
- Sport: Boxing

Pentti Kontula (4 September 1930 – 13 June 1987) was a Finnish boxer. He competed in the men's light middleweight event at the 1952 Summer Olympics.
