= József Sátori =

Hungarian rower

Personal information
- Nationality: Hungarian
- Born: 25 February 1926; Budapest, Hungary
- Died: 23 February 2014 (aged 87)

Sport
- Sport: Rowing

József Sátori (25 February 1926 – 23 February 2014) was a Hungarian rower. He competed at the 1948 Summer Olympics, the 1952 Summer Olympics and the 1960 Summer Olympics. Along with his family, he helped to hide Jewish people from the Nazis during World War II.
