= Ali Tawfik Youssif =

Egyptian rower

Ali Youssif
Personal information
- Full name: Ali Tawfik Youssif
- Nationality: Egyptian
- Born: 15 April 1924

Sport
- Sport: Rowing

Ali Tawfik Youssif (Arabic: علي توفيق يوسف, born 15 April 1924) was an Egyptian rower. He competed in the men's coxed pair event at the 1952 Summer Olympics.
