= Arie Richard Hanitzsch =

Brazilian diver

Personal information
- Born: 18 August 1927; São Paulo, Brazil
- Died: 3 August 1994 (aged 66)

Sport
- Sport: Diving

Arie Richard Hanitzsch (18 August 1927 – 3 August 1994) was a Brazilian diver. He competed in the men's 10 metre platform event and scored 59.40 points at the 1952 Summer Olympics.
