= Zdzisław Michalski =

Polish rower

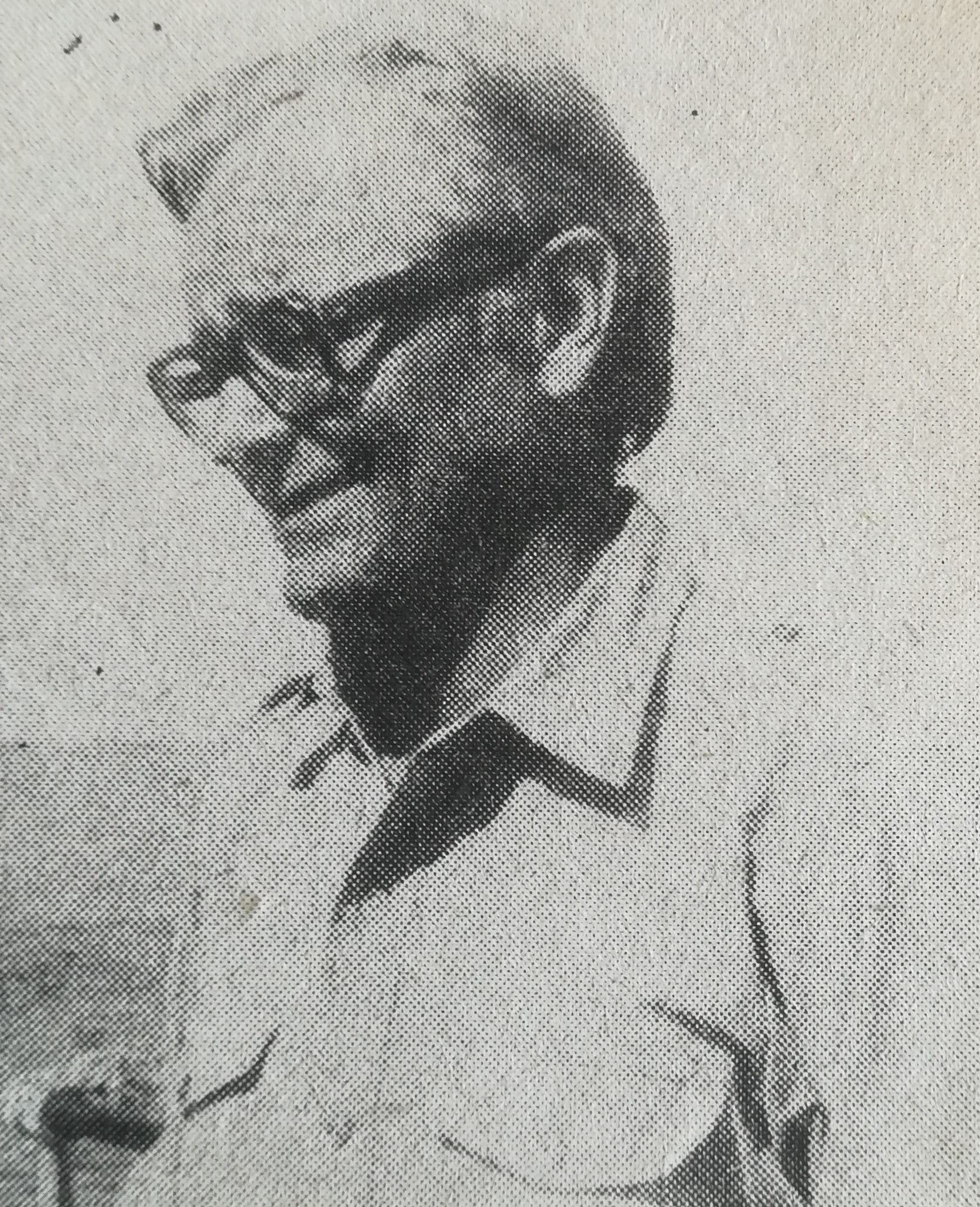
Zdzisław Michalski

Zdzisław Michalski (11 February 1928 – 28 September 1985) was a Polish rower who competed in the 1952 Summer Olympics.
