= Mário Jorge (basketball) =

Brazilian basketball player (1926–2019)

Mário Jorge da Fonseca Hermes, also commonly known as Mário Jorge (14 August 1926 – 28 June 2019), was a Brazilian basketball player who competed in the 1952 Summer Olympics. He died in June 2019 at the age of 92.

== Career ==
Hermes began his career in 1941 at Clube Central de Niterói in Rio de Janeiro. But it was the basketball team Clube de Regatas do Flamengo he stood out as part of the team that was ten-times champion between 1951 and 1960.

For the Brazilian national team, Hermes was a bronze medalist at the Pan American Games 1951. In the 1952 Helsinki Olympics, he was the Brazilian flag bearer. Hermes received a silver medal at the 1954 World Championship.

In 1988, Hermes accepted the invitation of the Brazilian Basketball Confederation to exercise unpaid activity in the entity. He headed the Brazilian delegations of basketball in the South American Championship in Ecuador (1989); in the America's Cup of Basketball in Mexico (1989); Good Will Games "in Seattle, United States (1990) and the World Championship in Argentina (1990).

In 2007, Hermes carried the torch at the Pan American Games in Rio de Janeiro.
