= Heinz Manchen =

West German rower

Personal information
- Born: 2 May 1931 Bremen, Germany
- Died: 20 March 1978 (aged 46) Bremen, West Germany

Sport
- Sport: Rowing
Medal record
Men's rowing
Representing Germany
Olympic Games
| Silver medal – second place | 1952 Helsinki | Coxed pair |
European Rowing Championships
| Silver medal – second place | 1953 Copenhagen | Coxed pair |

Heinz Joachim Manchen (2 May 1931 – 20 March 1978) was a German rower who competed in the 1952 Summer Olympics. In 1952 he was a crew member of the German boat which won the silver medal in the coxed pair event.
