= Czesław Lorenc =

Polish rower

Czesław Ignacy Lorenc (14 April 1925 – 30 July 2015) was a Polish rower who competed in the 1952 Summer Olympics.
