= Yevgeny Morozov (rower) =

Soviet rower (1929–2021)

Personal information
- Nationality: Soviet
- Born: Yevgeny Mikhailovich Morozov; 12 January 1929; Leningrad, RSFSR, Soviet Union
- Died: 23 March 2021 (aged 92); Veliky Novgorod, Russia

Sport
- Sport: Rowing

Yevgeny Mikhailovich Morozov (Russian: Евгений Михайлович Морозов; 12 January 1929 – 23 March 2021) was a Soviet rower. He competed in the men's coxed pair event at the 1952 Summer Olympics.
