= Mikhail Prudnikov =

Russian coxswain (born 1928)

Personal information
- Born: 1928 Altai Krai, Russian SFSR, Soviet Union

Sport
- Sport: Rowing

Mikhail Ivanovich Prudnikov (Russian: Михаил Иванович Прудников; born 1928) is a Russian coxswain who represented the Soviet Union. He competed at the 1952 Summer Olympics in Helsinki with the men's coxed pair where they were eliminated in the semi-final repêchage.
