= Giuseppe Ramani =

Italian rower (1922–1973)

Personal information
- Born: 15 July 1922 Koper, Italy
- Died: 15 February 1973 (aged 50)

Sport
- Sport: Rowing
Medal record
Men's rowing
Representing Italy
European Rowing Championships
Gold medal – first place	1949 Amsterdam	Coxed pair
Gold medal – first place	1950 Milan	Coxed pair
Gold medal – first place	1951 Mâcon	Coxed pair

Giuseppe Ramani (15 July 1922 – 15 February 1973) was an Italian rower. Ramani was born in 1922 in Koper, which was located in Italy at the time but was assigned to Yugoslavia after World War II. He competed at the 1952 Summer Olympics in Helsinki with the men's coxed pair where they came fourth.
