= Édouard Candeveau =

Swiss rower

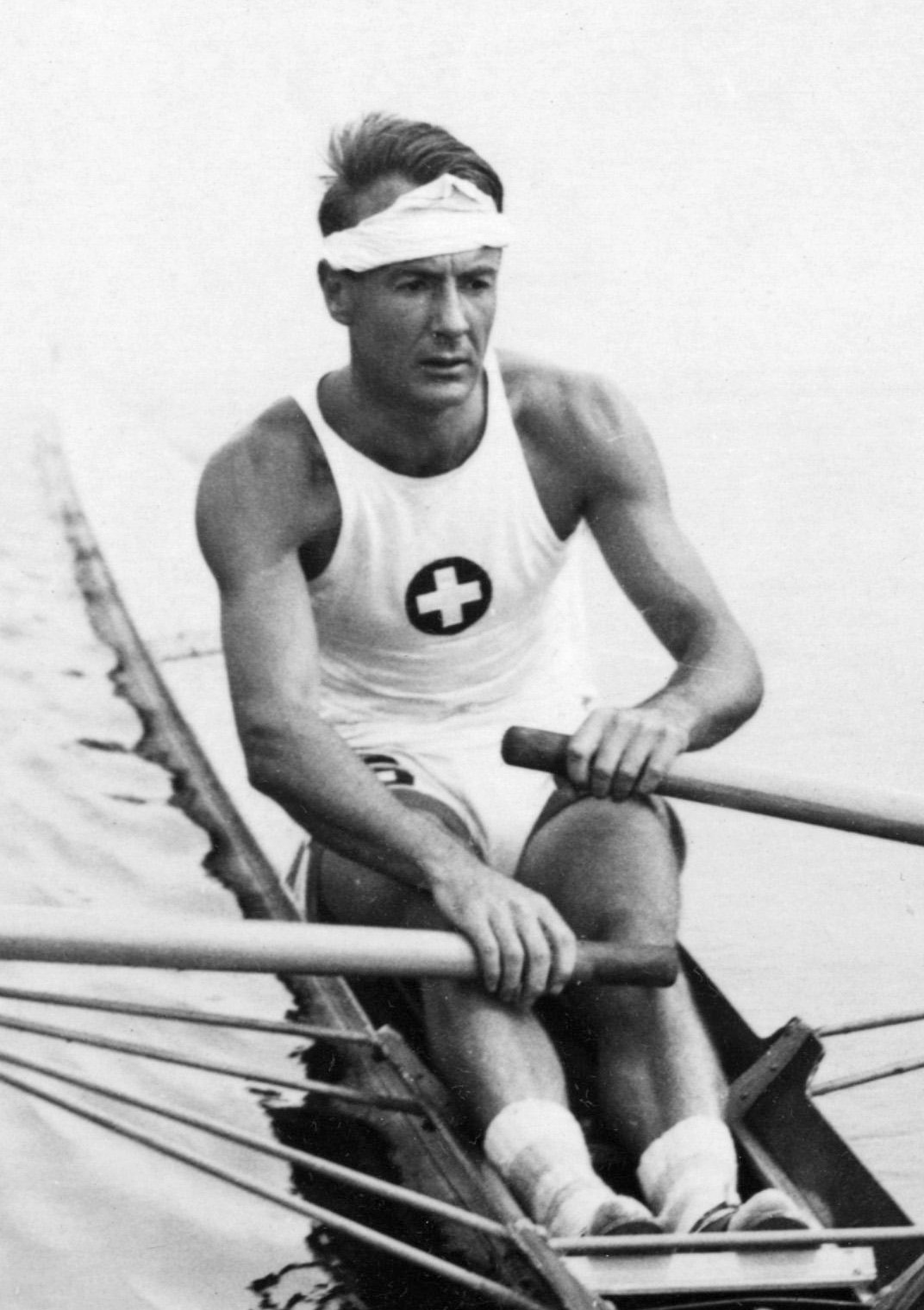
- Édouard Candeveau at the 1928 Olympics

Personal information
- Born: 11 February 1898
- Died: 12 November 1989 (aged 91)

Sport
- Sport: Rowing
- Club: SN Genève, Cologny
Medal record
Representing Switzerland
Olympic Games
Bronze medal – third place	1920 Antwerp	Coxed pair
Gold medal – first place	1924 Paris	Coxed pair
European Rowing Championships
Silver medal – second place	1920 Mâcon	Coxed pair
Gold medal – first place	1922 Barcelona	Coxed pair
Gold medal – first place	1923 Como	Coxed pair
Bronze medal – third place	1925 Prague	Coxed four
Gold medal – first place	1929 Bydgoszcz	Double sculls
Gold medal – first place	1931 Paris	Single sculls

Édouard Candeveau (11 February 1898 – 12 November 1989) was a Swiss rower who competed at the 1920, 1924 and 1928 Summer Olympics. He won a bronze medal and a gold medal in the coxed pairs in 1920 and 1924, respectively. In 1928, he competed in the single sculls and finished seventh after being eliminated in the quarter-finals. At the European championships, Candeveau won four gold, one silver and one bronze medal between 1920 and 1931.
