= Bussières, Saône-et-Loire =

Bussières
- Commune
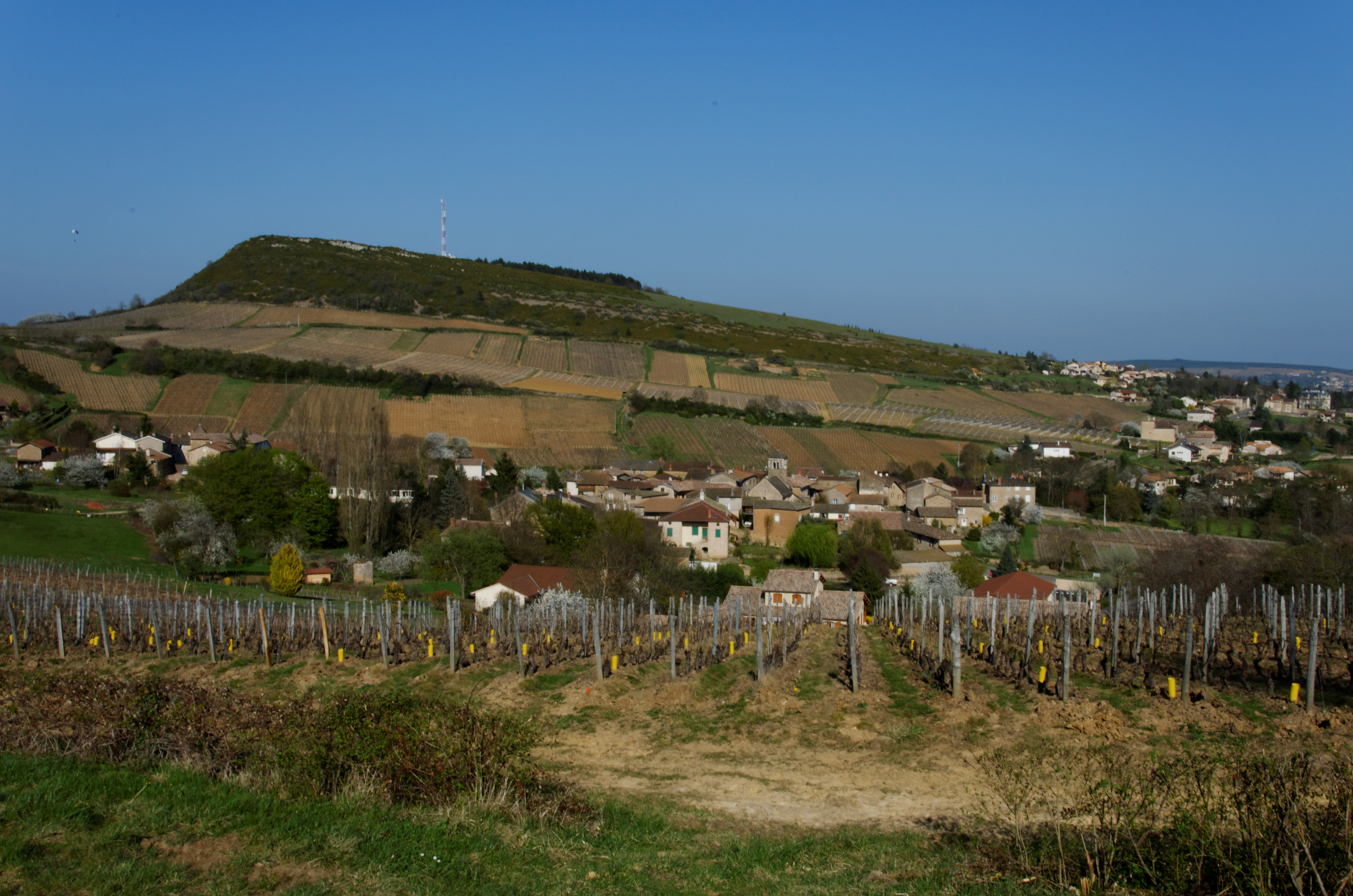
- A general view of Bussières
- Location of Bussières
- Location within France Location within Bourgogne-Franche-Comté
- Coordinates: 46°20′20″N 4°42′03″E
- Country: France
- Region: Bourgogne-Franche-Comté
- Department: Saône-et-Loire
- Arrondissement: Mâcon
- Canton: Hurigny
- Intercommunality: Mâconnais Beaujolais Agglomération

Government
  - Mayor (2020–2026): Rémy Desplanches
- Area^{1}: 4.08 km^{2} (1.58 sq mi)
- Elevation: 250 m (820 ft)
- Highest elevation: 405 m (1,329 ft)
- Lowest elevation: 219 m (719 ft)
- Population (2023): 580
  - Density: 140/km^{2} (370/sq mi)
- Time zone: UTC+01:00 (CET)
  - Summer (DST): UTC+02:00 (CEST)
- INSEE/Postal code: 71069 /71960
- ^{1} French Land Register data, which excludes lakes, ponds, glaciers > 1 km^{2} (0.386 sq mi or 247 acres) and river estuaries.

Bussières (French pronunciation: [bysjɛʁ]) is a commune in the Saône-et-Loire department in the region of Bourgogne-Franche-Comté in eastern France.

== See also ==
- Communes of the Saône-et-Loire department
