= Helge Vasenius =

Finnish diver

Personal information
- Full name: Helge Allan Arthur Vasenius
- Nationality: Finnish
- Born: 23 February 1927 Helsinki, Finland
- Died: 27 January 2008 (aged 80) Helsinki, Finland

Sport
- Sport: Diving

Helge Allan Arthur Vasenius (23 February 1927 – 27 January 2008) was a Finnish diver. He competed at the 1952 Summer Olympics and the 1956 Summer Olympics.
