= Helmut Noll =

German rower (1934–2018)

Olympic medal record

Men's rowing
Silver medal – second place	1952 Helsinki	Coxed pair

Helmut Noll (27 June 1934 – 27 November 2018) was a German rower who competed in the 1952 Summer Olympics. In 1952, he was the coxswain of the German boat which won the silver medal in the coxed pairs event.

== Personal life ==
Helmut's grandson, Nahuel Noll, is a professional footballer in Germany.
