= Alfred Felber =

Swiss rower

Personal information
- Born: 19 September 1886
- Died: 10 April 1967 (aged 80) Geneva, Switzerland

Sport
- Sport: Rowing
- Club: SN Genève, Cologny
Medal record
Men's rowing
Representing Switzerland
Olympic Games
Gold medal – first place	1924 Paris	Coxed pair
Bronze medal – third place	1920 Antwerp	Coxed pair
European Rowing Championships
Silver medal – second place	1913 Ghent	Coxed pair
Silver medal – second place	1920 Mâcon	Coxed pair
Gold medal – first place	1922 Barcelona	Coxed pair
Gold medal – first place	1924 Zürich	Coxed pair

Alfred Felber (19 September 1886 – 10 April 1967) was a Swiss rower who competed in the 1920 Summer Olympics and in the 1924 Summer Olympics.

In 1920 he won the bronze medal as member of the Swiss boat in the coxed pair competition. Four years later he won the gold medal with the Swiss boat in the same event.
