= Alfredo Bercht =

Brazilian sailor (1922–2005)

Personal information
- Born: 2 January 1922 Porto Alegre, Brazil
- Died: 30 May 2005 (aged 83)

Sport
- Sport: Sailing

Alfredo Bercht (2 January 1922 – 30 May 2005) was a Brazilian sailor. He competed at the 1952 Summer Olympics and the 1956 Summer Olympics. He was 1956 Brazilian National champion in the Snipe class.
