= Gino Sopracordevole =

Italian rowing coxswain

Personal information
- Born: 24 September 1904 Venice, Italy
- Died: 1 September 1995 (aged 90) Venice, Italy

Sport
- Sport: Rowing
Medal record
Men's rowing
Representing Italy
Olympic Games
Silver medal – second place	1924 Paris	Coxed pair
European Rowing Championships
Silver medal – second place	1923 Como	Coxed pair
Bronze medal – third place	1924 Zürich	Coxed pair

Gino Sopracordevole (24 September 1904 – 1 September 1995) was an Italian rowing coxswain who competed in the 1924 Summer Olympics. Sopracordevole was born in Venice in 1904. In 1924 he won the silver medal as coxswain of the Italian boat in the coxed pair event.
