= Luciano Marion =

Italian rowing cox (1928–1993)

Personal information
- Born: 22 September 1928 Koper, Italy
- Died: 29 August 1993 (aged 64)

Sport
- Sport: Rowing
Medal record
Men's rowing
Representing Italy
European Rowing Championships
Gold medal – first place	1949 Amsterdam	Coxed pair
Gold medal – first place	1950 Milan	Coxed pair
Gold medal – first place	1951 Mâcon	Coxed pair

Luciano Marion (22 September 1928 – 29 August 1993) was an Italian coxswain. Marion was born in 1928 in Koper, which was located in Italy at the time but was assigned to Yugoslavia after World War II. He competed at the 1952 Summer Olympics in Helsinki with the men's coxed pair where they came fourth.
