= Francisco Furtado =

Brazilian rower (1917–2001)

Francisco Augusto Furtado (28 February 1917 – 7 April 2001), also known as Chiquito, was a Brazilian rower who competed in the 1952 Summer Olympics in the coxed pairs event. Furtado died on 7 April 2001, at the age of 84.
