= Eva Pfarrhofer =

Austrian diver

Personal information
- Nationality: Austrian
- Born: 29 May 1928 Vienna, Austria
- Died: 3 May 2017 (aged 88) Vienna, Austria

Sport
- Sport: Diving
Medal record
Women's diving
Representing Austria
European Championships
Bronze medal – third place	1954 Turin	10 m platform

Eva Pfarrhofer (29 May 1928 – 3 May 2017) was an Austrian diver. She competed at the 1952 Summer Olympics and the 1956 Summer Olympics.
