= Theunis van Schalkwyk =

South African boxer

Personal information
- Born: 14 September 1929 Krugersdorp, South Africa
- Died: 27 August 2005 (aged 75) Roodepoort, South Africa
Medal record
Men's Boxing
Representing South Africa
Olympic Games
Silver medal – second place	1952 Helsinki	Light middleweight
British Empire Games
Gold medal – first place	1950 Auckland	Middleweight

Theunis Jacobus van Schalkwyk (14 September 1929 – 27 August 2005) was a boxer from South Africa, silver medalist at the 1952 Summer Olympics in Helsinki.

He was born in Krugersdorp, Gauteng.
