= Veijo Mikkolainen =

Finnish rower

Personal information
- Nationality: Finnish
- Born: 25 August 1924; Pervomayskoye, Finland
- Died: 7 April 2013 (aged 88); Valkeakoski, Finland

Sport
- Sport: Rowing

Veijo Mikkolainen (25 August 1924 – 7 April 2013) was a Finnish rower. He competed in the men's coxed pair event at the 1952 Summer Olympics.
