= Giovanni Scatturin =

Italian rower (1893–1951)

Personal information
- Born: 30 May 1893 Venice, Italy
- Died: 11 October 1951 (aged 58) Rosario, Argentina

Sport
- Sport: Rowing
Medal record
Men's rowing
Representing Italy
Olympic Games
Gold medal – first place	1920 Antwerp	Coxed pair
Silver medal – second place	1924 Paris	Coxed pair
European Rowing Championships
Silver medal – second place	1910 Ostend	Eight
Silver medal – second place	1923 Como	Coxed pair
Bronze medal – third place	1924 Zürich	Coxed pair

Giovanni Scatturin (30 May 1893 – 11 October 1951) was an Italian rower, born in Venice, who competed in the 1920 Summer Olympics and in the 1924 Summer Olympics.

In 1920 he won the gold medal as crew member of the Italian boat in the coxed pair event. Four years later he won the silver medal with the Italian boat in the same event.
