= Boris Tishin =

Russian boxer

Medal record

Men's Boxing

Representing Soviet Union

Olympic Games
Bronze medal – third place	1952 Helsinki	Light-middleweight

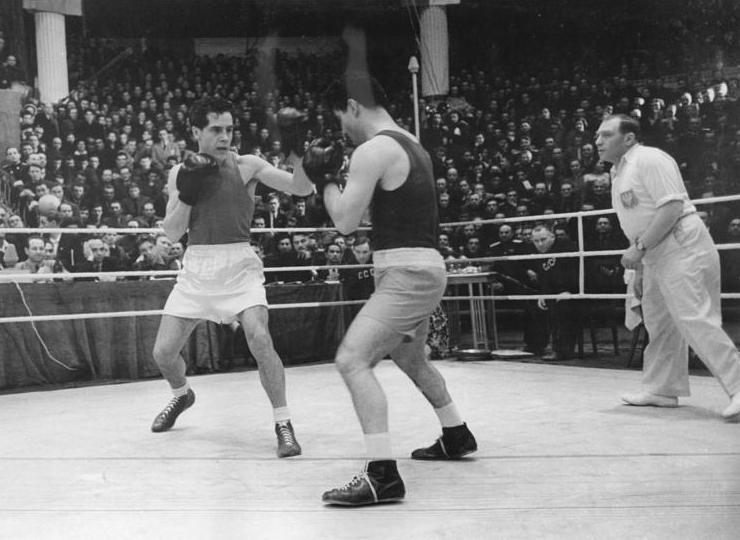
Boris Tischin (left), Laslo Papp, International Amateur Boxing Tournament in Moscow from March 7-15, 1952

Boris Ivanovich Tishin (Russian: Бори́с Ива́нович Ти́шин) (2 January 1929 – 28 August 1980) was a boxer from the Soviet Union. He competed for the Soviet Union in the 1952 Summer Olympics held in Helsinki, Finland in the light-middleweight event where, as a losing semifinalist, he was awarded a bronze medal.
