= Jørgen Frantzen =

Danish rower (1935–2020)

Olympic medal record

Men's rowing
Bronze medal – third place	1952 Helsinki	Coxed pair

Jørgen Nagel Frantzen (9 May 1935 in Holbæk, Denmark – 10 January 2020) was a Danish rower who competed in the 1952 Summer Olympics at the age of 17. In 1952 he was the coxswain of the Danish boat which won the bronze medal in the coxed pairs event. His teammates at the Olympics was Svend Pedersen and Poul Svendsen.

At club level he was a part of Frederiksværk Roklub.
