= John Tandrevold =

Norwegian boxer

Personal information
- Nationality: Norwegian
- Born: 13 January 1927 Stavanger, Norway
- Died: 28 January 2013 (aged 86) Stavanger, Norway

Sport
- Sport: Boxing

John Tandrevold (13 January 1927 – 28 January 2013) was a Norwegian boxer. He competed in the men's light middleweight event at the 1952 Summer Olympics.
