= Mohamed Fakhry Abbas =

Egyptian diver (born 1932)

Personal information
- Nationality: Egyptian
- Born: 25 November 1932 (age 92)

Sport
- Sport: Diving

Mohamed Fakhry Rifaat Abbas (born 25 November 1932) is an Egyptian diver. He competed in the men's 10 metre platform at the 1952 Summer Olympics.
