= Helio Vieira =

Brazilian fencer (1914–2003)

Hélio de Araújo Vieira
Personal information
- Born: 15 November 1914 Rio de Janeiro, Brazil
- Died: 19 May 2003 (aged 88)

Sport
- Sport: Fencing

Hélio de Araújo Vieira (15 November 1914 – 19 May 2003) was a Brazilian fencer. He competed in the team épée event at the 1952 Summer Olympics.

Vieira died in Rio de Janeiro on 19 May 2003, at the age of 88.
