= Paulo Cavalheiro =

Brazilian boxer

Personal information
- Nationality: Brazilian
- Born: 6 May 1934
- Died: 18 June 1989 (aged 55)

Sport
- Sport: Boxing

Paulo Cavalheiro (6 May 1934 – 18 June 1989) was a Brazilian boxer. He competed in the men's light middleweight event at the 1952 Summer Olympics.
