= Neacșu Șerbu =

Romanian boxer

Personal information
- Nationality: Romanian
- Born: 27 September 1928

Sport
- Sport: Boxing

Neacșu Șerbu (born 27 September 1928) was a Romanian boxer. He competed in the men's light middleweight event at the 1952 Summer Olympics.
