= Helmut Heinhold =

West German rower (1927–2008)

Personal information
- Born: 1 July 1927 Bremen, Germany
- Died: 7 November 2008 (aged 81) Herne, Germany

Sport
- Sport: Rowing
Medal record
Men's rowing
Representing Germany
Olympic Games
Silver medal – second place	1952 Helsinki	Coxed pair
European Rowing Championships
Silver medal – second place	1953 Copenhagen	Coxed pair

Helmut Heinhold (1 July 1927 – 7 November 2008) was a German rower who competed in the 1952 Summer Olympics. In 1952 he was a crew member of the German boat which won the silver medal in the coxed pair event.
