= Harry Mosé =

Brazilian rower

Personal information
- Born: 29 December 1917 Espírito Santo, Brazil

Sport
- Sport: Rowing

Harry Mosé (born 29 December 1917; died before 2002) was a Brazilian rower. He competed in the men's coxed pair event at the 1952 Summer Olympics.
