= João Maio =

Brazilian rower 1929–2003

João Arruela Maio
Personal information
- Born: 24 July 1929; Vitoria, Espirito Santo, Brazil
- Died: 10 January 2003 (aged 73); Espirito Santo, Brazil

Sport
- Sport: Rowing

João Maio (24 July 1929 – 10 January 2003) was a Brazilian rower. He competed in the men's coxed pair event at the 1952 Summer Olympics.
