= Edward Jennings (rowing) =

American coxswain

Medal record

Men's rowing

Representing the United States

Olympic Games
Gold medal – first place	1932 Los Angeles	Coxed pair
Bronze medal – third place	1924 Paris	Coxed pair

Edward Francis Jennings (April 9, 1898 – February 9, 1975) was an American rowing coxswain who competed in the 1924 Summer Olympics and in the 1932 Summer Olympics. He was born in Pennsylvania and died in San Diego, California. In 1924 he was the cox of the American boat, which won the bronze medal in the coxed pairs. Eight years later he won the gold medal as cox of the American boat in the same event.
