= Svend Ove Pedersen =

Danish rower

Olympic medal record

Men's rowing
Bronze medal – third place	1952 Helsinki	Coxed pair

Svend Ove Pedersen (31 October 1920 – 3 August 2009) was a Danish rower who competed in the 1952 Summer Olympics.

He was born in Frederiksværk and was the father of Egon Pedersen.

In 1952, he was a crew member of the Danish boat which won the bronze medal in the coxed pairs event.
