= Pogoń Prudnik (football) =

Polish association football club

- Full name: Miejski Klub Sportowy Pogoń Prudnik
- Nicknames: Biało-niebiescy (The White and Blues)
- Founded: 15 September 1945; 80 years ago
- Ground: Kolejowa 7 Street Stadium
- Capacity: 2,200
- Chairman: Waldemar Bedryj
- Manager: Dawid Jędrychowski
- League: Regional league Opole
- 2023–24: IV liga Opole, 16th of 16 (relegated)
colours	colours

Pogoń Prudnik (Polish pronunciation: [ˈpɔɡɔɲ ˈprudɲik]) is a Polish football club based in Prudnik. The team's colors are blue and white.

The club was founded on 15 September 1945. In the 1967–68, 1968–69, 1969–70, 1970–71 and 1978–79 seasons, they competed in the III liga (currently II liga).

Pogoń hosts its games at the Kolejowa 7 Street Stadium in Prudnik.

== 2015–16 squad ==
Note: Flags indicate national team as defined under FIFA eligibility rules; some limited exceptions apply. Players may hold more than one non-FIFA nationality.

No.	Pos.	Nation	Player
1	GK	POL	Tomasz Roskosz
80	GK	POL	Krzysztof Łubowski
15	DF	POL	Dawid Cajzner
3	DF	POL	Marcel Fedorowicz
3	DF	POL	Jakub Florczak
15	DF	POL	Damian Miałkas
6	DF	POL	Grzegorz Pietruszka
18	DF	POL	Bartłomiej Rewucki
16	DF	POL	Jakub Rysz
13	DF	POL	Bartosz Wójtowicz
7	DF	POL	Marcin Wicher
10	MF	POL	Adam Churas
17	FW	POL	Mateusz Dziwisz

No.	Pos.	Nation	Player
5	MF	POL	Roman Forma
9	MF	POL	Marek Gościej
17	MF	POL	Dominik Pawłowski
9	MF	POL	Mateusz Płóciennik
2	MF	POL	Łukasz Scholz
4	MF	POL	Patryk Surma
14	MF	POL	Damian Leśniowski
8	MF	UKR	Vitaliy Kudryk
16	MF	UKR	Vadym Mohilecky
10	FW	POL	Marcin Rudzki
