= Bernard Malivoire =

French rower

Olympic medal record

Men's rowing

Representing France
Gold medal – first place	1952 Helsinki	Coxed pair

Bernard Robert Malivoire (20 April 1938 – 18 December 1982) was a French rower who competed in the 1952 Summer Olympics.

He was born in Bergerac, Dordogne.

In 1952, he was the coxswain of the French boat that won the gold medal in the coxed pairs event at the Summer Olympics.

Malivoire was the youngest medalist and gold medalist at the 1952 Games, aged 14 years and 95 days.
