= Mohamed El-Sahrawi =

Egyptian rower

Personal information
- Full name: Mohamed Fathi Ahmed Abdallah El-Sahrawi
- Nationality: Egyptian
- Born: 2 February 1926

Sport
- Sport: Rowing

Mohamed El-Sahrawi (born 2 February 1926) was an Egyptian rower. He competed in the men's coxed four event at the 1952 Summer Olympics.
