= Róbert Zimonyi =

American rower

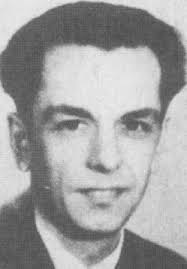

Personal information
- Born: 18 April 1918 Sárvár, Hungary
- Died: 2 February 2004 (aged 85) Miami, Florida, U.S.
- Height: 170 cm (5 ft 7 in)
- Weight: 52 kg (115 lb)

Sport
- Sport: Rowing
- Club: Duna Budapesti-i Evezős Egylet; Budapesti Kinizsi; Vesper Boat Club
Medal record
Representing Hungary
Olympic Games
Bronze medal – third place	1948 London	Coxed pair
Representing the United States
Olympic Games
Gold medal – first place	1964 Tokyo	Eight
Pan American Games
Gold medal – first place	1967 Winnipeg	Coxed four
European Rowing Championships
Bronze medal – third place	1965 Duisburg	Eight

Róbert Zimonyi (18 April 1918 – 2 February 2004) was a Hungarian-born American rowing coxswain. He competed for Hungary in various events at the 1948 and 1952 Olympics and won a bronze medal in coxed pairs. After the Hungarian Revolution of 1956, he moved to the United States and became an American citizen in 1962. With American teams, he won an Olympic gold medal in 1964 and a European bronze medal in 1965, both in the eights, and a gold medal at the 1967 Pan American Games in coxed fours.

Zimonyi left rowing in late 1960s, and did not coach. He was an accountant by training, but after immigrating to the United States, he worked at a brick company of a fellow rower John B. Kelly Sr. In 1963, he became an accountant at Sandmeyer Steel, and worked there until retiring by age in 1983.

== Personal life ==
Zimonyi had a sister in Hungary. After that he moved to Florida to improve his health, together with his partner, Isabel Gressner.

== Cited sources ==
- William A Stowe (2005). All Together. iUniverse. ISBN 978-0-595-34388-1.
