= Lars-Erik Larsson (rower) =

Swedish rower

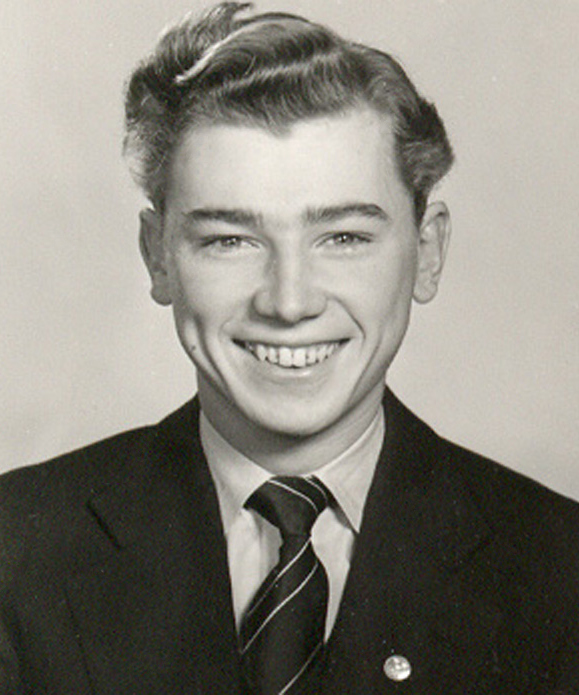

Personal information
- Born: 7 July 1937 (age 89) Falkenberg, Sweden

Sport
- Sport: Rowing
- Club: Falkenbergs RK

Lars-Erik Larsson (born 7 July 1937) is a retired Swedish rowing coxswain. He competed in the coxed pairs at the 1952 Summer Olympics, but failed to reach the final. Aged 15 he was the youngest Swedish participant at those games.
