= Leon Butler =

American rower (1892–1973)

Olympic medal record

Men's rowing
Bronze medal – third place	1924 Paris	Coxed pair

Leon Edward Butler (December 2, 1892 – June 15, 1973) was an American rower who competed in the 1924 Summer Olympics. In 1924 he was a member of the American boat, which won the bronze medal in the coxed pairs.
