= Mohamed Anwar =

Egyptian rower

Mohamed Samih Anwar
Personal information
- Nationality: Egyptian
- Born: 10 December 1924

Sport
- Sport: Rowing

Mohamed Samih Anwar (born 10 December 1924) was an Egyptian rower. He competed in the men's coxed pair event at the 1952 Summer Olympics.
