= Ahmed Fahti Mohamed Hashad =

Egyptian diver (born 1927)

Personal information
- Nationality: Egyptian
- Born: 8 July 1927

Sport
- Sport: Diving

Ahmed Fahti Mohamed Hashad (born 8 July 1927) is an Egyptian former diver. He competed at the 1952 Summer Olympics.
