= Albert Selim El-Mankabadi =

Egyptian rower

Personal information
- Nationality: Egyptian
- Born: 10 March 1917
- Died: 1 August 1970 (aged 53); Toronto, Ontario, Canada

Sport
- Sport: Rowing

Albert Selim El-Mankabadi (10 March 1917 – 1 August 1970) was an Egyptian rower. He competed in two events at the 1952 Summer Olympics.
