= Sören Danielsson =

Swedish boxer (1930–2018)

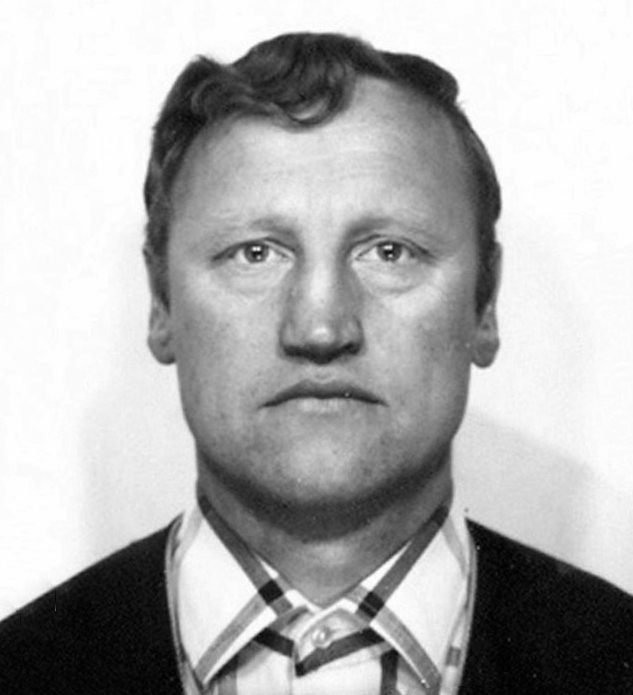

Personal information
- Born: 8 February 1930 Stora Kopparberg, Sweden
- Died: 19 April 2018 (aged 88)

Sport
- Sport: Boxing
- Club: IK Balder, Stockholm

Sören Leopold Gustaf Danielsson (8 February 1930 – 19 April 2018) was a Swedish light-middleweight boxer (−71 kg). He competed at the 1952 Summer Olympics, but was eliminated in the second round.
