= Aleksandr Bakatin =

Russian diver (1922–1977)

Personal information
- Born: 1922
- Died: 1977 (aged 54–55)

Sport
- Sport: Diving

Aleksandr Bakatin (Russian: Александр Бакатин; 1922–1977) was a diver from Russia. He competed in the 10m platform at the 1952 Summer Olympics and finished in seventh place.
