= Franz Worisch =

Austrian diver

Personal information
- Nationality: Austrian
- Born: 17 May 1926; Vienna, Austria
- Died: 7 August 1989 (aged 63); Vienna, Austria

Sport
- Sport: Diving

Franz Worisch (17 May 1926 – 7 August 1989) was an Austrian diver. He competed at the 1948 Summer Olympics and the 1952 Summer Olympics.
