= Aldo Tarlao =

Italian rower

Personal information
- Born: 26 March 1926 Grado, Italy
- Died: 12 March 2018 (aged 91) Trieste, Italy
Medal record
Men's rowing
Representing Italy
Olympic Games
Silver medal – second place	1948 London	Coxed pair
European Championships
Silver medal – second place	1947 Lucerne	Coxed pair
Gold medal – first place	1949 Amsterdam	Coxed pair
Gold medal – first place	1950 Milan	Coxed pair
Gold medal – first place	1951 Mâcon	Coxed pair

Aldo Tarlao (26 March 1926 – 12 March 2018) was an Italian rower who competed in the 1948 Summer Olympics and in the 1952 Summer Olympics. He was born in Grado. In 1948 he was a crew member of the Italian boat which won the silver medal in the coxed pair event. Four years later he finished fourth with the Italian boat in the coxed pair competition.
