= Raymond Salles =

French rower (1920–1996)

Olympic medal record

Men's rowing

Representing France
Gold medal – first place	1952 Helsinki	Coxed pair

Raymond Julien Salles (18 July 1920 – 15 June 1996) was a French rower who competed in the 1952 Summer Olympics.

He was born in Paris.

In 1952 he was a crew member of the French boat which won the gold medal in the coxed pairs event.
