= Ahmed Kamel Aly =

Egyptian diver

Personal information
- Nationality: Egyptian
- Born: 27 February 1925

Sport
- Sport: Diving
Medal record
Representing Egypt
Mediterranean Games
Gold medal – first place	1951 Alexandria	3m springboard
Silver medal – second place	1951 Alexandria	10m platform

Ahmed Kamel Aly (born 27 February 1925) is an Egyptian former diver. He competed at the 1952 Summer Olympics.
