= Fencing at the 1948 Summer Olympics – Men's sabre =

Olympic fencing tournament

Men's sabre at the Games of the XIV Olympiad
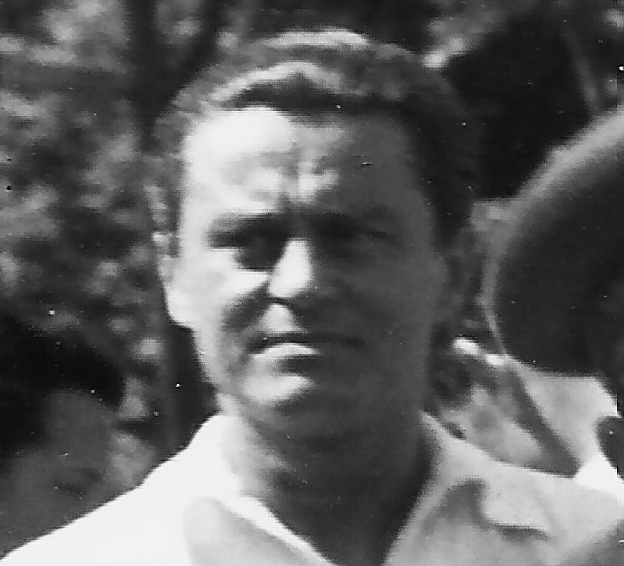
- Aladár Gerevich (1952)
- Venue: Wembley Palace of Engineering, London
- Dates: 12 – 13 August 1948
- Competitors: 60 from 24 nations

Medalists
1st place, gold medalist(s)		Aladár Gerevich	Hungary
2nd place, silver medalist(s)		Vincenzo Pinton	Italy
3rd place, bronze medalist(s)		Pál Kovács	Hungary

The men's sabre was one of seven fencing events on the fencing at the 1948 Summer Olympics programme. It was the eleventh appearance of the event. The competition was held from 12 August 1948 to 13 August 1948. 60 fencers from 24 nations competed. Nations were limited to three fencers each. The event was won by Aladár Gerevich, the fifth of nine straight Games in which a Hungarian would win the event. Gerevich became the third man to win multiple medals in the individual sabre, adding to his 1936 bronze. Vincenzo Pinton of Italy took silver and Pál Kovács of Hungary took bronze; it was the third straight Games where the sabre podium was Hungary-Italy-Hungary.

== Background ==
This was the 11th appearance of the event, which is the only fencing event to have been held at every Summer Olympics. Three of the nine finalists from 1936 returned after the 12-year break: bronze medalist Aladár Gerevich of Hungary, fifth-place finisher Vincenzo Pinton of Italy, and seventh-place finisher Antoni Sobik of Poland. Hungary, dominant in the event since the 1908 Games, was expected to perform well again, led by Gerevich and 1937 world champion Pál Kovács. Aldo Montano of Italy had won the 1938 and 1947 world championships (1939 through 1946 had been cancelled due to World War II) and would have been a favorite, but he did not compete in the individual event, leaving Pinton as the greatest challenger to the Hungarians.

Finland and Peru each made their debut in the men's sabre. Italy and Denmark each made their ninth appearance in the event, tied for most of any nation, each having missed two of the first three events but having appeared every Games since 1908.

== Competition format ==
The competition format was pool play round-robin, with bouts to five touches. Not all bouts were played in some pools if not necessary to determine advancement. Ties were broken through fence-off bouts ("barrages") in early rounds if necessary for determining advancement, but by touches received in final rounds (and for non-advancement-necessary placing in earlier rounds). The fencers from the top four teams in the team sabre event received a bye in the first round.

- Round 1: There 8 pools of between 6 and 7 fencers each. The top 3 fencers in each pool advanced to the quarterfinals.
- Quarterfinals: There were 4 pools of 8 or 9 fencers each. The top 4 fencers in each quarterfinal advanced to the semifinals. (The format was designed for 9 fencers in each pool, but Belgium—which received byes to the quarterfinals—had no individual fencers, so the three pools which would have had Belgian fencers had 8 fencers instead of 9.)
- Semifinals: There were 2 pools of 8 fencers each. The top 4 fencers in each semifinal advanced to the final.
- Final: The final pool had 8 fencers.

== Schedule ==
All times are British Summer Time (UTC+1)

Date	Time	Round
Thursday, 12 August 1948		Round 1
Friday, 13 August 1948		Quarterfinals; Semifinals; Final

== Results ==
=== Round 1 ===
The top 3 finishers in each pool advanced to the quarterfinals.

Fencers from the four teams that advanced to the final of the men's team sabre event received byes through round 1, though Belgium had no individual competitors:

- Hungary: Tibor Berczelly, Aladár Gerevich, and Pál Kovács
- Italy: Gastone Darè, Vincenzo Pinton, and Carlo Turcato
- United States: Dean Cetrulo, Tibor Nyilas, and George Worth

==== Pool 1 ====
Rank	Fencer	Nation	Wins	Losses	Notes
1	Salah Dessouki	Egypt	4	1	Q
2	Antonio Haro	Mexico	4	2	Q
3	Svatopluk Skýva	Czechoslovakia	4	1	Q
4	Roberto Mañalich	Cuba	3	3	
5	Arthur Pilbrow	Great Britain	3	3	
6	Rıza Arseven	Turkey	1	4	
7	Kauko Jalkanen	Finland	0	5	

==== Pool 2 ====
Rank	Fencer	Nation	Wins	Losses	Notes
1	Jacques Lefèvre	France	4	0	Q
2	Willem van den Berg	Netherlands	3	0	Q
3	Robin Brook	Great Britain	3	2	Q
4	Benito Ramos	Mexico	1	3	
5	Sabri Tezcan	Turkey	1	3	
6	Erkki Kerttula	Finland	0	4	

==== Pool 3 ====
Rank	Fencer	Nation	Wins	Losses	Notes
1	Hubert Loisel	Austria	5	0	Q
2	Jean Levavasseur	France	4	2	Q
3	Ahmed Abou-Shadi	Egypt	4	2	Q
4	Jaroslav Starý	Czechoslovakia	3	3	
5	Ivan Osiier	Denmark	2	3	
6	Nils Sjöblom	Finland	1	5	
7	Fidel Luña	Mexico	0	4	

==== Pool 4 ====
Rank	Fencer	Nation	Wins	Losses	Notes
1	Alois Sokol	Czechoslovakia	6	0	Q
2	Heinz Putzl	Austria	4	2	Q
3	Juan Paladino	Uruguay	4	2	Q
4	Ivan Ruben	Denmark	2	3	
5	Andrés Neubauer	Chile	2	4	
6	Merih Sezen	Turkey	1	4	
7	Ioannis Karamazakis	Greece	1	5	

==== Pool 5 ====
Rank	Fencer	Nation	Wins	Losses	Notes
1	Eddy Kuijpers	Netherlands	4	1	Q
2	Fernando Huergo	Argentina	3	2	Q
3	Aage Leidersdorff	Denmark	3	2	Q
4	Werner Plattner	Austria	2	3	
5	Otto Greter	Switzerland	2	3	
6	Nikolaos Khristogiannopoulos	Greece	1	4	

==== Pool 6 ====
Rank	Fencer	Nation	Wins	Losses	Notes
1	Edgardo Pomini	Argentina	5	0	Q
2	Antoni Sobik	Poland	4	1	Q
3	Frans Mosman	Netherlands	3	2	Q
4	Walter Widemann	Switzerland	2	3	
5	Roland Asselin	Canada	1	4	
6	Juan Antonio Martínez	Cuba	0	5	

==== Pool 7 ====
Gramain and Zulficar defeated Zaczyk in a three-way barrage for second and third place.

Rank	Fencer	Nation	Wins	Losses	Notes
1	Jorge Cermesoni	Argentina	4	1	Q
2	Maurice Gramain	France	3	2	Q
3	Mohamed Zulficar	Egypt	3	2	Q
4	Teodor Zaczyk	Poland	3	2	
5	Ignacio Goldstein	Chile	2	3	
6	Athanasios Nanopoulos	Greece	0	5	

==== Pool 8 ====
Sarria defeated Eriksson in a barrage for third place.

Rank	Fencer	Nation	Wins	Losses	Notes
1	Roger Tredgold	Great Britain	4	1	Q
2	Etienne Molnar	Brazil	4	1	Q
3	Jorge Sarria	Peru	3	2	Q
4	Bo Eriksson	Sweden	3	2	
5	Bolesław Banaś	Poland	1	4	
6	Alphonse Ruckstuhl	Switzerland	0	5	

=== Quarterfinals ===
The top 4 finishers in each pool advanced to the semifinals.

==== Quarterfinal 1 ====
Rank	Fencer	Nation	Wins	Losses	Notes
1	Jean Levavasseur	France	6	0	Q
2	Tibor Berczelly	Hungary	5	1	Q
3	Dean Cetrulo	United States	4	3	Q
4	Hubert Loisel	Austria	4	2	Q
5	Frans Mosman	Netherlands	2	4	
6	Ahmed Abou-Shadi	Egypt	2	4	
7	Jorge Sarria	Peru	1	5	
8	Jorge Cermesoni	Argentina	1	6	

==== Quarterfinal 2 ====
Rank	Fencer	Nation	Wins	Losses	Notes
1	Gastone Darè	Italy	5	1	Q
2	Jacques Lefèvre	France	5	1	Q
3	George Worth	United States	4	2	Q
4	Antoni Sobik	Poland	4	3	Q
5	Willem van den Berg	Netherlands	3	4	
6	Fernando Huergo	Argentina	2	4	
7	Etienne Molnar	Brazil	2	5	
8	Heinz Putzl	Austria	0	5	

==== Quarterfinal 3 ====
Haro defeated Tredgold and Kuijpers in a three-way barrage for fourth place.

Rank	Fencer	Nation	Wins	Losses	Notes
1	Aladár Gerevich	Hungary	7	0	Q
2	Vincenzo Pinton	Italy	5	2	Q
3	Salah Dessouki	Egypt	4	3	Q
4	Antonio Haro	Mexico	3	4	Q
5	Roger Tredgold	Great Britain	3	4	
6	Eddy Kuijpers	Netherlands	3	4	
7	Juan Paladino	Uruguay	2	5	
8	Svatopluk Skýva	Czechoslovakia	1	6	

==== Quarterfinal 4 ====
Rank	Fencer	Nation	Wins	Losses	Notes
1	Pál Kovács	Hungary	6	0	Q
2	Tibor Nyilas	United States	5	1	Q
3	Aage Leidersdorff	Denmark	5	2	Q
4	Carlo Turcato	Italy	5	3	Q
5	Robin Brook	Great Britain	3	4	
5	Edgardo Pomini	Argentina	3	4	
5	Alois Sokol	Czechoslovakia	3	5	
8	Maurice Gramain	France	2	5	
9	Mohamed Zulficar	Egypt	0	8	

=== Semifinals ===
The top 4 finishers in each pool advanced to the final.

==== Semifinal 1 ====
Rank	Fencer	Nation	Wins	Losses	Notes
1	Pál Kovács	Hungary	6	0	Q
2	George Worth	United States	5	1	Q
3	Vincenzo Pinton	Italy	5	2	Q
4	Tibor Nyilas	United States	4	3	Q
5	Jean Levavasseur	France	3	4	
6	Carlo Turcato	Italy	2	4	
7	Salah Dessouki	Egypt	1	5	
8	Aage Leidersdorff	Denmark	0	7	

==== Semifinal 2 ====
Rank	Fencer	Nation	Wins	Losses	Notes
1	Jacques Lefèvre	France	6	1	Q
2	Aladár Gerevich	Hungary	5	1	Q
2	Gastone Darè	Italy	5	1	Q
4	Antonio Haro	Mexico	4	3	Q
5	Tibor Berczelly	Hungary	4	3	
6	Dean Cetrulo	United States	1	5	
6	Antoni Sobik	Poland	1	5	
8	Hubert Loisel	Austria	0	7	

=== Final ===
Rank	Fencer	Nation	Wins	Losses	TS	TR
1st place, gold medalist(s)	Aladár Gerevich	Hungary	7	0	35	18
2nd place, silver medalist(s)	Vincenzo Pinton	Italy	5	2	32	23
3rd place, bronze medalist(s)	Pál Kovács	Hungary	5	2	33	24
4	Jacques Lefèvre	France	4	3	27	26
5	George Worth	United States	2	5	26	27
6	Gastone Darè	Italy	2	5	25	30
7	Tibor Nyilas	United States	2	5	20	31
8	Antonio Haro	Mexico	1	6	15	34
