= Poland at the 1948 Summer Olympics =

- IOC code: POL
- NOC: Polish Olympic Committee

in London, Great Britain 29 July 1948 – 14 August 1948
- Competitors: 37 in 5 sports
- Flag bearer: Mieczysław Łomowski
- Medals Ranked 34th: Gold 0 Silver 0 Bronze 1 Total 1

Summer Olympics appearances (overview)
- 1924; 1928; 1932; 1936; 1948; 1952; 1956; 1960; 1964; 1968; 1972; 1976; 1980; 1984; 1988; 1992; 1996; 2000; 2004; 2008; 2012; 2016; 2020; 2024; 2028

Other related appearances
- Russian Empire (1900, 1912); Austria (1908–1912)

Poland competed at the 1948 Summer Olympics in London, England. 37 competitors, 30 men and 7 women, took part in 26 events in 5 sports.

== Medalists ==
Medal	Name	Sport	Event
Bronze	Aleksy Antkiewicz	Boxing	Men's featherweight

== Athletics ==
Men
Field events

Athlete	Event	Qualification		Final	
Athlete	Event	Distance	Position	Distance	Position
Edward Adamczyk	Long jump	7,030	9 q	6.735	11
Witold Gerutto	Shot put	14.450	12 q	14.37	10
Mieczysław Łomowski	Shot put	14.700	7 Q	15.43	4

Combined events – Decathlon

Athlete	Event	100 m	LJ	SP	HJ	400 m	110H	DT	PV	JT	1500 m	Final	Rank
Edward Adamczyk	Result	11.7	7.080	13.2	1.75	52.5	15.8	39.11	3.40	43.7	4:28.6	6712	9
Edward Adamczyk	Points	662	825	735	727	740	804	685	652	476	406	6712	9
Wacław Kuźmicki	Result	12.0	6.565	12.34	1.70	54.3	17.6	38.06	3.2	47.34	4:41.8	6153	16
Wacław Kuźmicki	Points	597	690	652	671	656	587	655	575	539	531	6153	16
Witold Gerutto	Result	12.1	5.905	14.53	1.70	55.4	17.0	41.8	3.00	51.06	5:17.8	6106	19
Witold Gerutto	Points	576	534	871	671	610	651	765	501	607	320	6106	19

Women
Field events

Athlete	Event	Qualification		Final	
Athlete	Event	Distance	Position	Distance	Position
Henryka Słomczewska-Nowak	Long jump	5.180	17	Did not advance	
Melania Sinoracka	Javelin throw	—N/a		35.74	11
Jadwiga Wajs-Marcinkiewicz	Discus throw	—N/a		39.30	4

== Boxing ==
Men

Athlete	Event	1 Round	2 Round	Quarterfinals	Semifinals	Final	
Athlete	Event	Opposition Result	Opposition Result	Opposition Result	Opposition Result	Opposition Result	Rank
Janusz Kasperczak	Flyweight	Ronald Gower (AUS); L PTS	did not advance				
Wawrzyniec Bazarnik	Bantamweight	Celestino González (CHI); L PTS	did not advance				
Aleksy Antkiewicz	Featherweight	Leon Trani (PHI); W PTS	Pedro Garcia (PER); W PTS	Seo Byeong-Ran (KOR); W PTS	Ernesto Formenti (PHI); L PTS	Francisco Núñez (ARG); W PTS	Bronze medal
Zygmunt Chychła	Welterweight	Frits Wijngaard (KOR); W PTS	Alex Obeysekere (CEY); W KO2	Alessandro D'Ottavio (ITA); L PTS	did not advance		5
Antoni Kolczyński	Middleweight	BYE	Dogomar Martínez (URU); L PTS	did not advance			
Franciszek Szymura	Light Heavyweight	Mac Joachim (IND); W PTS	Israel Quitcón (PUR); W RSC1	Mauro Cía (ARG); L PTS	did not advance		5

== Canoeing ==
=== Sprint ===
Men

Athlete	Event	Heats		Repechages		Semifinals		Final	
Athlete	Event	Time	Rank	Time	Rank	Time	Rank	Time	Rank
Czesław Sobieraj	K-1 1000 m	4:46.5	5	—N/a				did not advance	
Czesław Sobieraj	K-1 10000 m	—N/a						52:51.0	7
Alfons Jeżewski; Marian Matłotka	K-2 1000 m	NT	8	—N/a				did not advance	
Alfons Jeżewski; Marian Matłotka	K-2 10000 m	—N/a						48:25.6	10

== Fencing ==
Seven fencers, six men and one woman, represented Poland in 1948.

=== Men ===
Athlete	Event	Group round		Quarterfinals		Semifinals		Final	
Athlete	Event	Opposition Result	Rank	Opposition Result	Rank	Opposition Result	Rank	Opposition Result	Rank
Rajmund Karwicki	Men's épée	Zappelli (SUI); Haro (MEX); Parfitt (GBR); Skotidas (GRE); Henkart (BEL); Mikla (HUN)	6	did not advance					62
Jan Nawrocki	Men's épée	Dunay (HUN); Horn (CAN); De Beaumont (GBR); Radoux (BEL); Camargo (BRA); Karamazakis (GRE); Valero (MEX)	7	did not advance					55
Bolesław Banaś; Antoni Sobik; Teodor Zaczyk; Jan Nawrocki; Rajmund Karwicki	Team épée	Argentina; L 6-10; Cuba; W 8-6	2 Q	Italy; L 1-14; Hungary; L 6-10	4	did not advance			10
Bolesław Banaś	Men's sabre	Tredgold (GBR); Molnar (BRA); Sarria (PER); Eriksson (SWE); Ruckstuhl (SUI)	5	did not advance					49
Antoni Sobik	Men's sabre	Pomini (ARG); Mosman (NED); Widemann (SUI); Asselin (CAN); Martinez (CUB)	2 Q	Dare (ITA); Lefevre (FRA); Worth (USA); Van Den Berg (NED); Huergo (ARG); Molnar (BRA); Putzl (AUT)	4 Q	Lefevre (FRA); Gerevich (HUN); Dare (ITA); Haro (MEX); Berczelly (HUN); Cetrulo (USA); Loisel (AUT)	5	did not advance	12
Teodor Zaczyk	Men's sabre	Cermesoni (ARG); Gramain (FRA); Zulficar (HUN); Goldstein (CHI); Nanopoulos (GRE)	4	did not advance					40
Bolesław Banaś; Antoni Sobik; Teodor Zaczyk; Jerzy Wójcik	Team sabre	Turkey; W 11-5	2 Q	Austria; W 8-8 (59:55)	2 Q	Belgium; L 7-9; Hungary; L 3-12	3	Did not advance	5

=== Women ===
Athlete	Event	Group round		Quarterfinals		Semifinals		Final	
Athlete	Event	Opposition Result	Rank	Opposition Result	Rank	Opposition Result	Rank	Opposition Result	Rank
Irena Nawrocka	Women's foil	Cerra (USA); Klüpfel (SUI); Kun (HUN); Olsen (DEN); Meijer (NED); Dermody (IRL)	5	did not advance					31

== Art competitions ==
Athlete	Event	Category	Title	Rank
Zbigniew Turski	Music	Choral and orchestral	Olympic Symphony	Gold medal
