= Fencing at the 1948 Summer Olympics – Men's team sabre =

Men's team sabre at the Games of the XIV Olympiad
- Venue: Wembley Palace of Engineering, London
- Dates: 10 – 11 August 1948
- Competitors: 85 from 17 nations

Medalists
1st place, gold medalist(s)		Aladár Gerevich; Tibor Berczelly; Rudolf Kárpáti; Pál Kovács; László Rajcsányi; Bertalan Papp	Hungary
2nd place, silver medalist(s)		Vincenzo Pinton; Gastone Darè; Carlo Turcato; Mauro Racca; Aldo Montano; Renzo Nostini	Italy
3rd place, bronze medalist(s)		Norman Cohn-Armitage; George Worth; Tibor Nyilas; Dean Cetrulo; Miguel de Capriles; James Flynn	United States

The men's team sabre was one of seven fencing events on the fencing at the 1948 Summer Olympics programme. It was the eighth appearance of the event. The competition was held from 10 August 1948 to 11 August 1948. 85 fencers from 17 nations competed.

The competition format continued the pool play round-robin from prior years. Each of the four fencers from one team would face each of the four from the other, for a total of 16 bouts per match. The team that won more bouts won the match, with competition potentially stopping when one team reached 9 points out of the possible 16 (this did not always occur and matches sometimes continued). If the bouts were 8–8, touches received was used to determine the winning team. Pool matches unnecessary to the result were not played.

== Rosters ==
Argentina

- Manuel Agüero
- José D'Andrea
- Edgardo Pomini
- Jorge Cermesoni
- Fernando Huergo
- Daniel Sande

Austria

- Werner Plattner
- Heinz Putzl
- Heinz Lechner
- Hubert Loisel

Belgium

- Robert Bayot
- Georges de Bourguignon
- Ferdinand Jassogne
- Eugène Laermans
- Marcel Nys
- Édouard Yves

Canada

- Robert Desjarlais
- Alf Horn
- Roland Asselin
- Georges Pouliot

Czechoslovakia

- Jindřich Kakos
- Svatopluk Skýva
- Jaroslav Starý
- Alois Sokol
- Jindřich Chmela

Egypt

- Salah Dessouki
- Mohamed Zulficar
- Mahmoud Younes
- Ahmed Abou-Shadi

France

- Jean-François Tournon
- Jean Parent
- Maurice Gramain
- Jacques Lefèvre
- Jean Levavasseur
- Georges Lévêcque

Great Britain

- Arthur Pilbrow
- George Moore
- Emrys Lloyd
- Roger Tredgold
- Robin Brook

Greece

- Nikolaos Khristogiannopoulos
- Athanasios Nanopoulos
- Ioannis Karamazakis
- Andreas Skotidas

Hungary

- Aladár Gerevich
- Tibor Berczelly
- Rudolf Kárpáti
- Pál Kovács
- László Rajcsányi
- Bertalan Papp

Italy

- Vincenzo Pinton
- Gastone Darè
- Carlo Turcato
- Mauro Racca
- Aldo Montano
- Renzo Nostini

Mexico

- Benito Ramos
- Francisco Valero
- Antonio Haro
- Fidel Luña

Netherlands

- Henny ter Weer
- Antoon Hoevers
- Willem van den Berg
- Frans Mosman
- Eddy Kuijpers

Poland

- Antoni Sobik
- Bolesław Banaś
- Teodor Zaczyk
- Jerzy Wójcik
- Jan Nawrocki

Switzerland

- Roland Turian
- Alphonse Ruckstuhl
- Otto Greter
- Walter Widemann

Turkey

- Merih Sezen
- Nihat Balkan
- Rıza Arseven
- Sabri Tezcan
- Vural Balcan

United States

- Norman Cohn-Armitage
- George Worth
- Tibor Nyilas
- Dean Cetrulo
- Miguel de Capriles
- James Flynn

== Results ==
=== Round 1 ===
The top two teams in each pool advanced to round 2.

==== Pool 1 ====
Egypt (13–3) and Czechoslovakia (9–2) each defeated Mexico.

Rank	Nation	MW	ML	BW	BL	Notes
1	Egypt	1	0	13	3	Q
2	Czechoslovakia	1	0	9	2	Q
3	Mexico	0	2	5	22	

==== Pool 2 ====
Austria (14–2) and France (9–1) each defeated Switzerland.

Rank	Nation	MW	ML	BW	BL	Notes
1	Austria	1	0	14	2	Q
2	France	1	0	9	1	Q
3	Switzerland	0	2	3	23	

==== Pool 3 ====
Poland (11–5) and Belgium (9–2) each defeated Turkey.

Rank	Nation	MW	ML	BW	BL	Notes
1	Poland	1	0	11	5	Q
2	Belgium	1	0	9	2	Q
3	Turkey	0	2	7	20	

==== Pool 4 ====
The Netherlands (13–3) and Italy (9–1) each defeated Canada.

Rank	Nation	MW	ML	BW	BL	Notes
1	Netherlands	1	0	13	3	Q
2	Italy	1	0	9	1	Q
3	Canada	0	2	4	22	

==== Pool 5 ====
The United States (14–2) and Argentina (9–1) each defeated Greece.

Rank	Nation	MW	ML	BW	BL	Notes
1	United States	1	0	14	2	Q
2	Argentina	1	0	9	1	Q
3	Greece	0	2	3	23	

==== Pool 6 ====
Denmark withdrew, leaving Great Britain and Hungary to advance unopposed.

Rank	Nation	MW	ML	BW	BL	Notes
1	Great Britain	0	0	0	0	Q
1	Hungary	0	0	0	0	Q
3	Denmark	0	0	0	0	Withdrew

=== Round 2 ===
The top two teams in each pool advanced to the semifinals.

==== Pool 1 ====
Belgium (13–3) and Hungary (9–3) each defeated Egypt.

Rank	Nation	MW	ML	BW	BL	Notes
1	Belgium	1	0	13	3	Q
2	Hungary	1	0	9	3	Q
3	Egypt	0	2	6	22	

==== Pool 2 ====
The United States (11–5) and Italy (9–4) each defeated Great Britain.

Rank	Nation	MW	ML	BW	BL	Notes
1	United States	1	0	11	5	Q
2	Italy	1	0	9	4	Q
3	Great Britain	0	2	9	20	

==== Pool 3 ====
Argentina beat the Netherlands 9–7, the Netherlands beat Czechoslovakia 10–6, and Argentina defeated Czechoslovakia 9–7.

Rank	Nation	MW	ML	BW	BL	Notes
1	Argentina	2	0	18	14	Q
2	Netherlands	1	1	17	15	Q
3	Czechoslovakia	0	2	13	19	

==== Pool 4 ====
France (10–6) and Poland (8–8, 55–59 touches against) each defeated Austria.

Rank	Nation	MW	ML	BW	BL	Notes
1	France	1	0	10	6	Q
2	Poland	1	0	8	8	Q
3	Austria	0	2	14	18	

=== Semifinals ===
The top two teams in each pool advanced to the final.

==== Semifinal 1 ====
Hungary beat Argentina 15–1, Belgium defeated Poland 9–7, Belgium defeated Argentina 9–4, and Hungary beat Poland 12–3.

Rank	Nation	MW	ML	BW	BL	Notes
1	Hungary	2	0	27	4	Q
2	Belgium	2	0	18	11	Q
3	Poland	0	2	10	21	
4	Argentina	0	2	5	24	

==== Semifinal 2 ====
Italy beat the Netherlands 13–3, the United States defeated France 11–5, the United States defeated the Netherlands 9–2, and Italy beat France 9–5.

Rank	Nation	MW	ML	BW	BL	Notes
1	Italy	2	0	22	8	Q
2	United States	2	0	20	7	Q
3	France	0	2	10	20	
4	Netherlands	0	2	5	22	

=== Final ===
In the first pairings, Italy defeated Belgium and Hungary beat the United States, each by a score of 10–6. Hungary (9–1 over Belgium) and Italy (8–8 over the United States, prevailing by touches received 59–61) won again in the second set of matches as well. The United States beat Belgium 10–5 in a de facto bronze medal match, while Hungary prevailed 10–6 over Italy for the gold medal.

Rank	Nation	MW	ML	BW	BL
1st place, gold medalist(s)	Hungary	3	0	29	13
2nd place, silver medalist(s)	Italy	2	1	24	24
3rd place, bronze medalist(s)	United States	1	2	24	23
4	Belgium	0	3	12	29
