= Egypt at the 1948 Summer Olympics =

- IOC code: EGY
- NOC: Egyptian Olympic Committee

in London
- Competitors: 85 in 12 sports
- Flag bearer: Mahmoud Hassan
- Medals Ranked 16th: Gold 2 Silver 2 Bronze 1 Total 5

Summer Olympics appearances (overview)
- 1912; 1920; 1924; 1928; 1932; 1936; 1948; 1952; 1956; 1960–1964; 1968; 1972; 1976; 1980; 1984; 1988; 1992; 1996; 2000; 2004; 2008; 2012; 2016; 2020; 2024; 2028

Other related appearances
- 1906 Intercalated Games –––– United Arab Republic (1960, 1964)

Egypt competed at the 1948 Summer Olympics in London, England. 85 competitors, all men, took part in 53 events in 12 sports.

== Medalists ==
=== Gold ===
- Ibrahim Shams — Weightlifting, Lightweight
- Mahmoud Fayad - Weightlifting, Featherweight

=== Silver ===
- Attia Hamouda — Weightlifting, Lightweight
- Mahmoud Hassan — Wrestling, Greco-Roman Bantamweight

=== Bronze ===
- Ibrahim Orabi — Wrestling, Greco-Roman Light Heavyweight

== Diving ==
Men

| Athlete | Event | Final | |
| Athlete | Event | Points | Rank |
|---|---|---|---|
| Kamal Ali Hassan | 3 m springboard | 119.90 | 7 |
| Mohamed Ibrahim | 3 m springboard | 97.52 | 22 |
| Ismail Ahmed Ramzi | 3 m springboard | 110.18 | 15 |
| Rauf Abu Al-Seoud | 10 m platform | 85.85 | 22 |
| Mohamed Abdel Khalek Allam | 10 m platform | 77.92 | 24 |
| Kamal Ali Hassan | 10 m platform | 95.33 | 12 |

== Fencing ==
Nine fencers, all men, represented Egypt in 1948.

Men's foil

- Osman Abdel Hafeez
- Hassan Hosni Tawfik
- Mahmoud Younes

Men's team foil

- Osman Abdel Hafeez, Salah Dessouki, Mahmoud Younes, Mohamed Zulficar, Hassan Hosni Tawfik, Mahmoud Abdin

Men's épée

- Mahmoud Younes
- Jean Asfar
- Mohamed Abdel Rahman

Men's team épée

- Salah Dessouki, Jean Asfar, Mahmoud Younes, Mohamed Abdel Rahman, Osman Abdel Hafeez

Men's sabre

- Salah Dessouki
- Ahmed Abou-Shadi
- Mohamed Zulficar

Men's team sabre

- Salah Dessouki, Mohamed Zulficar, Mahmoud Younes, Ahmed Abou-Shadi

== Gymnastics ==
Eight Egyptian athletes participated in the individual all around. As a team, they placed 13th.

- Ali Zaky, placed 82nd
- Moustafa Abdelal, placed 86th
- Mohamed Roushdi, placed 87th
- Ahmed Khalaf Ali, placed 88th
- Ali El-Hefnawi, placed 93rd
- Mohamed Aly, placed 94th
- Mahmoud Abdel-Aal, placed 95th
- Ahmed Khalil El-Giddawi, placed 107th

== Rowing ==
Egypt had one male rower participating in one out of seven rowing events in 1948.

Men's single sculls

- Mohamed El-Sayed

== Swimming ==
Men

| Athlete | Event | Heat | | Semifinal | | Final | |
| Athlete | Event | Time | Rank | Time | Rank | Time | Rank |
|---|---|---|---|---|---|---|---|
| Ali Ahmed Bagdadi | 100 m freestyle | 1:02.4 | 4* | Did not advance | | | |
| Taha Youssef El-Gamal | 100 m freestyle | 59.7 | 2 Q* | 59.9 | 4 q* | 1:00.5 | 8 |
| Dorri El-Said | 100 m freestyle | 1:02.5 | 4* | Did not advance | | | |
| Jack Hakim | 400 m freestyle | 5:40.3 | 39 | Did not advance | | | |
| Dorri El-Said | 100 m backstroke | 1:19.0 | 4* | Did not advance | | | |
| Ahmed Kandil | 200 m breaststroke | 2:45.5 | 3 Q | 2:43.7 | 3 Q | 2:47.5 | 7 |
| Ali Ahmed Bagdadi; Ahmed Kandil; Taha Youssef El-Gamal; Mohamed Abdel Aziz Khalifa | 4 × 200 m freestyle relay | 10:25.0 | 7* | —N/a | | Did not advance | |

*Ranks given are within the heat.

== Weightlifting ==
Bantamweight

- Abdel Hamid Yacout (11th)

Featherweight

- Mahmoud Fayad Gold
- Ibrahim El-Dessouki (12th)

Lightweight

- Ibrahim Shams Gold
- Attia Mohamed Hamouda Silver

Middleweight

- Khadr El-Touni (4th)

Light heavyweight

- Mohamed Ibrahim Saleh (11th)

Heavyweight

- Hanafi Moustafa (5th)
