= Greece at the 1948 Summer Olympics =

- IOC code: GRE
- NOC: Committee of the Olympic Games

in London United Kingdom
- Competitors: 61 in 10 sports
- Flag bearer: Georgios Kalambokidis
- Medals: Gold 0 Silver 0 Bronze 0 Total 0

Summer Olympics appearances (overview)
- 1896; 1900; 1904; 1908; 1912; 1920; 1924; 1928; 1932; 1936; 1948; 1952; 1956; 1960; 1964; 1968; 1972; 1976; 1980; 1984; 1988; 1992; 1996; 2000; 2004; 2008; 2012; 2016; 2020; 2024; 2028

Other related appearances
- 1906 Intercalated Games

Greece competed at the 1948 Summer Olympics in London, England. Greek athletes have competed in every Summer Olympic Games. 61 competitors, 60 men and 1 woman, took part in 44 events in 10 sports.

== Cycling ==
Three cyclists, all men, represented Greece in 1948.

Individual road race

- Manthos Kaloudis
- Evangelos Kouvelis
- Petros Leonidis

Team road race

- Manthos Kaloudis
- Evangelos Kouvelis
- Petros Leonidis

Sprint

- Manthos Kaloudis

== Fencing ==
Six fencers, all men, represented Greece in 1948.

Men's foil

- Ioannis Karamazakis
- Konstantinos Bembis
- Stefanos Zintzos

Men's team foil

- Athanasios Nanopoulos, Stefanos Zintzos, Ioannis Karamazakis, Konstantinos Bembis

Men's épée

- Andreas Skotidas
- Ioannis Karamazakis
- Athanasios Nanopoulos

Men's team épée

- Athanasios Nanopoulos, Andreas Skotidas, Stefanos Zintzos, Konstantinos Bembis, Ioannis Karamazakis

Men's sabre

- Nikolaos Khristogiannopoulos
- Athanasios Nanopoulos
- Ioannis Karamazakis

Men's team sabre

- Nikolaos Khristogiannopoulos, Athanasios Nanopoulos, Ioannis Karamazakis, Andreas Skotidas

== Rowing ==
Greece had eight male rowers participate in three out of seven rowing events in 1948.

Men's single sculls

- Faidon Matthaiou

Men's coxed pair

- Iakovidis Diakoumakos
- Georgios Venieris
- Grigorios Emmanouil (cox)

Men's coxed four

- Filas Paraskevaidis
- Nikos Filippidis
- Iraklis Klangas
- Nikos Nikolaou
- Grigorios Emmanouil (cox)

== Shooting ==
Seven shooters represented Greece in 1948.

25 metre pistol

- Konstantinos Mylonas
- Georgios Vikhos
- Vangelis Khrysafis

50 metre pistol

- Vangelis Khrysafis
- Nikolaos Tzovlas
- Georgios Stathis

50 metre rifle

- Ilias Valatas
- Georgios Vikhos
- Athanasios Aravositas

== Swimming ==
Men

Ranks given are within the heat.

Athlete	Event	Heat		Semifinal		Final	
Athlete	Event	Time	Rank	Time	Rank	Time	Rank
Panagiotis Khatzikyriakakis	100 m freestyle	1:07.4	6	Did not advance			
Nikolaos Melanofeidis	100 m backstroke	1:22.0	7	Did not advance			
