= Swimming at the 1948 Summer Olympics – Men's 100 metre freestyle =

Men's 100 metre freestyle at the Games of the XIV Olympiad
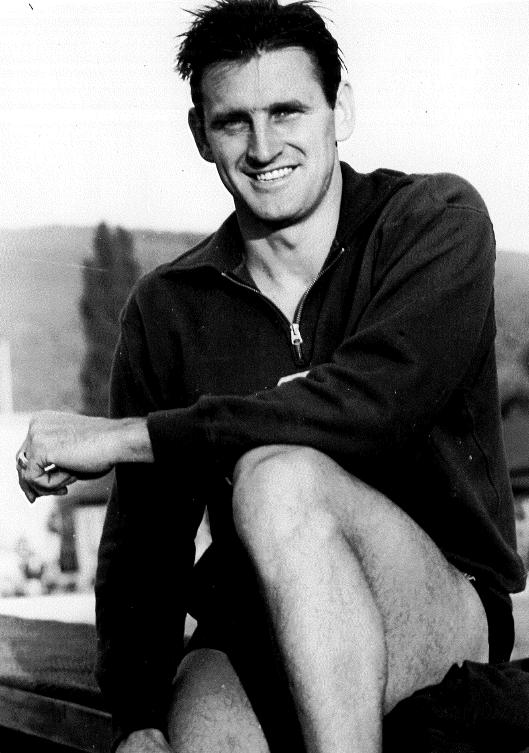
- Wally Ris
- Venue: Wembley Arena
- Dates: 30 July 1948 (heats & semifinals); 31 July 1948 (final)
- Competitors: 41 from 19 nations
- Winning time: 57.3 OR

Medalists
1st place, gold medalist(s)		Wally Ris; United States
2nd place, silver medalist(s)		Alan Ford; United States
3rd place, bronze medalist(s)		Géza Kádas; Hungary

The men's 100 metre freestyle event at the 1948 Olympic Games took place between 30 and 31 July at the Empire Pool. There were 41 competitors from 19 nations. Nations had been limited to three swimmers each since the 1924 Games. The event was won by Wally Ris, returning the United States to the podium in the event after a one-Games absence broke a seven-Games streak. It was the sixth victory for an American in the 100 metre freestyle, most of any nation. Another American, Alan Ford, took silver. Géza Kádas of Hungary earned bronze, the nation's third medal in four Games. Japan's three-Games medal streak in the event ended with no Japanese swimmers competing due to the nation not being invited after World War II.

== Background ==
This was the 10th appearance of the men's 100 metre freestyle. The event has been held at every Summer Olympics except 1900 (when the shortest freestyle was the 200 metres), though the 1904 version was measured in yards rather than metres.

None of the seven finalists from the pre-World War II 1936 Games returned. Alex Jany, a teenager from France, was the favorite in the event. The American team, including world record holder Alan Ford, was also strong. Ford had beaten Jany's record a month before the Games.

Cuba, Iceland, India, and Mexico each made their debut in the event. The United States made its 10th appearance, having competed at each edition of the event to date.

== Competition format ==
The competition used a three-round (quarterfinals, semifinals, final) format. The advancement rule was a modification of the one used since 1912, allowing the top swimmers in each race plus one or more wild cards to advance. For this event, the top two in each preliminary heat plus the next four fastest swimmers would advance to the semifinals; the top three in each semifinal plus the next two fastest swimmers would move on to the final. There were 6 heats of between 6 and 8 swimmers, allowing 16 swimmers to advance to the semifinals. The 2 semifinals had 8 swimmers each; 8 advanced to the final.

This swimming event used freestyle swimming, which means that the method of the stroke is not regulated (unlike backstroke, breaststroke, and butterfly events). Nearly all swimmers use the front crawl or a variant of that stroke. Because an Olympic-size swimming pool is 50 metres long, this race consisted of two lengths of the pool.

== Records ==
These were the standing world and Olympic records (in seconds) prior to the 1948 Summer Olympics.

World record	Alan Ford (USA)	55.4	New Haven, United States	29 June 1948
Olympic record	Masaharu Taguchi (JPN)	57.5	Berlin, Germany	8 August 1936

Wally Ris equaled the Olympic record in the second semifinal with 57.5 seconds, then beat it with 57.3 seconds in the final.

== Schedule ==
Date	Time	Round
Friday, 30 July 1948	14:00; 20:30	Heats; Semifinals
Saturday, 31 July 1948	15:30	Final

== Results ==
=== Heats ===
==== Heat 1 ====
Rank	Swimmer	Nation	Time	Notes
1	Alex Jany	France	58.1	Q
2	Bruce Bourke	Australia	59.1	Q
3	Elemér Szathmáry	Hungary	59.7	q
4	Olle Johansson	Sweden	1:01.0	
5	Plauto Guimarães	Brazil	1:03.7	
6	Isidoro Pérez	Spain	1:04.0	
7	Isaac Mansoor	India	1:06.4	

==== Heat 2 ====
Rank	Swimmer	Nation	Time	Notes
1	Keith Carter	United States	58.7	Q
2	Per-Olof Olsson	Sweden	59.0	Q
3	Zoltán Szilárd	Hungary	59.8	q
4	Manuel Guerra	Spain	1:00.7	
5	Augusto Cantón	Argentina	1:01.8	
6	Nicasio Silverio	Cuba	1:02.0	
7	Pat Kendall	Great Britain	1:02.1	
8	Dilip Mitra	India	1:06.9	

==== Heat 3 ====
Rank	Swimmer	Nation	Time	Notes
1	Géza Kádas	Hungary	58.2	Q
2	Alberto Isaac	Mexico	1:00.1	Q
3	Warren Boyd	Australia	1:00.4	q
4	Ali Ahmed Bagdadi	Egypt	1:02.4	
5	Eric Jubb	Canada	1:02.8	
6	Sachin Nag	India	1:03.8	

==== Heat 4 ====
Rank	Swimmer	Nation	Time	Notes
1	Horacio White	Argentina	1:00.2	Q
2	Aram Boghossian	Brazil	1:00.9	Q
3	Jesús Domínguez	Spain	1:01.3	
4	Dorri El-Said	Egypt	1:02.5	
5	Fernand Martinaux	France	1:04.2	
6	Panagiotis Khatzikyriakakis	Greece	1:07.4	

==== Heat 5 ====
Rank	Swimmer	Nation	Time	Notes
1	Wally Ris	United States	58.1	Q
2	Ronald Stedman	Great Britain	1:01.3	Q
3	Henri Padou, Jr.	France	1:01.5	
4	Sérgio Rodrigues	Brazil	1:01.6	
5	Wu Chuanyu	Republic of China	1:03.5	
6	Derek Oatway	Bermuda	1:08.6	

==== Heat 6 ====
Rank	Swimmer	Nation	Time	Notes
1	Alan Ford	United States	59.2	Q
2	Taha Youssef El-Gamal	Egypt	59.7	Q
3	Martin Lundén	Sweden	1:00.2	q
4	Peter Salmon	Canada	1:01.0	
5	Ari Guðmundsson	Iceland	1:01.6	
6	Trevor Harrop	Great Britain	1:02.3	
7	Raúl García	Cuba	1:02.5	
8	Walter Schneider	Switzerland	1:05.1	

=== Semifinals ===
==== Semifinal 1 ====
Rank	Swimmer	Nation	Time	Notes
1	Keith Carter	United States	57.6	Q
2	Alex Jany	France	57.9	Q
3	Zoltán Szilárd	Hungary	59.6	Q
4	Taha Youssef El-Gamal	Egypt	59.9	q
5	Bruce Bourke	Australia	1:00.0	
6	Martin Lundén	Sweden	1:00.2	
7	Alberto Isaac	Mexico	1:00.4	
8	Aram Boghossian	Brazil	1:01.0	

==== Semifinal 2 ====
Rank	Swimmer	Nation	Time	Notes
1	Wally Ris	United States	57.5	Q, =OR
2	Alan Ford	United States	57.8	Q
3	Géza Kádas	Hungary	58.0	Q
4	Per-Olof Olsson	Sweden	59.1	q
5	Horacio White	Argentina	1:00.4	
6	Elemér Szathmáry	Hungary	1:00.5	
7	Ronald Stedman	Great Britain	1:01.0	
8	Warren Boyd	Australia	1:01.1	

=== Final ===
Jany led at halfway but fell back into the pack after the turn. Ford led until the 80 metre point, when Ris passed him. Kádas, in a tight race with Ford for second place, crashed into the lane divider just before the end of the race.

Rank	Swimmer	Nation	Time	Notes
1st place, gold medalist(s)	Wally Ris	United States	57.3	OR
2nd place, silver medalist(s)	Alan Ford	United States	57.8	
3rd place, bronze medalist(s)	Géza Kádas	Hungary	58.1	
4	Keith Carter	United States	58.3	
5	Alex Jany	France	58.3	
6	Per-Olof Olsson	Sweden	59.3	
7	Zoltán Szilárd	Hungary	59.6	
8	Taha Youssef El-Gamal	Egypt	1:00.5	

== Results summary ==
Rank	Swimmer	Nation	Heats	Semifinals	Final	Notes
1st place, gold medalist(s)	Wally Ris	United States	58.1	57.5	57.3	OR
2nd place, silver medalist(s)	Alan Ford	United States	59.2	57.8	57.8	
3rd place, bronze medalist(s)	Géza Kádas	Hungary	58.2	58.0	58.1	
4	Keith Carter	United States	58.7	57.6	58.3	
5	Alex Jany	France	58.1	57.9	58.3	
6	Per-Olof Olsson	Sweden	59.0	59.1	59.3	
7	Zoltán Szilárd	Hungary	59.8	59.6	59.6	
8	Taha Youssef El-Gamal	Egypt	59.7	59.9	1:00.5	
9	Bruce Bourke	Australia	59.1	1:00.0	Did not advance	
10	Martin Lundén	Sweden	1:00.2	1:00.2	Did not advance	
11	Alberto Isaac	Mexico	1:00.1	1:00.4	Did not advance	
11	Horacio White	Argentina	1:00.2	1:00.4	Did not advance	
13	Elemér Szathmáry	Hungary	59.7	1:00.5	Did not advance	
14	Aram Boghossian	Brazil	1:00.9	1:01.0	Did not advance	
14	Ronald Stedman	Great Britain	1:01.3	1:01.0	Did not advance	
16	Warren Boyd	Australia	1:00.4	1:01.1	Did not advance	
17	Manuel Guerra	Spain	1:00.7	Did not advance		
18	Olle Johansson	Sweden	1:01.0	Did not advance		
18	Peter Salmon	Canada	1:01.0	Did not advance		
20	Jesús Domínguez	Spain	1:01.3	Did not advance		
21	Henri Padou, Jr.	France	1:01.5	Did not advance		
22	Ari Guðmundsson	Iceland	1:01.6	Did not advance		
22	Sérgio Rodrigues	Brazil	1:01.6	Did not advance		
24	Augusto Cantón	Argentina	1:01.8	Did not advance		
25	Nicasio Silverio	Cuba	1:02.0	Did not advance		
26	Pat Kendall	Great Britain	1:02.1	Did not advance		
27	Trevor Harrop	Great Britain	1:02.3	Did not advance		
28	Ali Ahmed Bagdadi	Egypt	1:02.4	Did not advance		
29	Dorri El-Said	Egypt	1:02.5	Did not advance		
29	Raúl García	Cuba	1:02.5	Did not advance		
31	Eric Jubb	Canada	1:02.8	Did not advance		
32	Wu Chuanyu	Republic of China	1:03.5	Did not advance		
33	Plauto Guimarães	Brazil	1:03.7	Did not advance		
34	Sachin Nag	India	1:03.8	Did not advance		
35	Isidoro Pérez	Spain	1:04.0	Did not advance		
36	Fernand Martinaux	France	1:04.2	Did not advance		
37	Walter Schneider	Switzerland	1:05.1	Did not advance		
38	Isaac Mansoor	India	1:06.4	Did not advance		
39	Dilip Mitra	India	1:06.9	Did not advance		
40	Panagiotis Khatzikyriakakis	Greece	1:07.4	Did not advance		
41	Derek Oatway	Bermuda	1:08.6	Did not advance		
