= Associazione Sportiva Petrarca Scherma =

Fencing team based in Padua, Italy

Associazione Sportiva Petrarca Scherma is a fencing team based in Padua, Italy.

== History ==
The team born in 1968 by Vincenzo Pinton, Mauro Racca and Carlo Turcato.

== Notable players ==
- (Italy) Giovanni Battista Coletti
- (Italy) Attilio Calatroni
- (Italy) Gianfranco Dalla Barba
- (Italy) Marco Marin

== Notable coaches ==
- (Poland) Ryszard Zub
