= Loisel =

Loisel is a surname. Notable people with the surname include:

- Élisabeth Loisel (born 1963), French footballer and manager
- Georg Loisel (born 1957), Austrian fencer
- Hubert Loisel (1912–1999), Austrian fencer
- John S. Loisel (1920–2010), American World War II flying ace
- Régis Loisel (born 1951), French comics writer and artist
