= Gordon Ward =

Gordon Ward may refer to:

- Gordon Ward (philatelist) (1885–1962), British philatelist
- Gordon Ward (diver) (1920–1986), British diver
- Sir Gordon Ward (judge), British judge in several Commonwealth countries
