= Salah Dessouki =

Egyptian fencer (1922–2011)

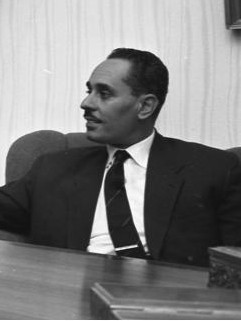
- Dessouki in 1962, as Governor of Cairo

Personal information
- Born: 22 October 1922 Cairo, Egypt
- Died: 17 August 2011 (aged 88) Nasr City, Cairo, Egypt

Sport
- Sport: Fencing
Medal record
World Championships
Bronze medal – third place	1947 Lisbon	Team sabre
Bronze medal – third place	1949 Cairo	Team foil
Bronze medal – third place	1949 Cairo	Team épée
Bronze medal – third place	1949 Cairo	Team sabre
Bronze medal – third place	1950 Monte Carlo	Team foil
Bronze medal – third place	1950 Monte Carlo	Team sabre
Bronze medal – third place	1951 Stockholm	Team foil
Mediterranean Games
Silver medal – second place	1951 Alexandria	Team sabre
Bronze medal – third place	1951 Alexandria	Team foil
Bronze medal – third place	1951 Alexandria	Team épée

Salah Asfar Shishtawai J. Dessouki (22 October 1922 – 17 August 2011) was an Egyptian fencer. He won bronze medals in three fencing disciplines across four editions of the World Championships and competed at the 1948 and 1952 Summer Olympics. By career he was a government official and served in several capacities, including as Governor of Cairo.

== Biography ==
Dessouki was born in Cairo on 22 October 1922. After World War II, he won three consecutive bronze medals in the team sabre event at the World Fencing Championships in 1947, 1949, and 1950. In all three years his team consisted of Mohamed Abdel Rahman, Mahmoud Younes, and Mohamed Zulficar. In 1949 and 1950 the squad also included Ahmed Abou-Shadi, while in 1950 they were aided by Roland Steinauer. In 1949, Dessouki, Abdel Rahman, Younes, and a fencer with the surname Schmeil also took bronze in the team épée, while Dessouki, Younes, Zulficar, Osman Abdel Hafeez, Hassan Hosni Tawfik, and Anwar Tawfik came in third in the team foil. The squad repeated this feat in 1950, with Steinauer replacing Anwar Tawfik, and in 1951 with Abou-Shadi instead of Seinauer.

Dessouki also competed at two editions of the Olympic Games, taking part in all three team discipline events each time. His best placement at each edition was in the team foil competition, finishing fifth in 1948 and fourth in 1952, losing to Hungary in the bronze medal match of the latter. In 1948 he also took part in the individual sabre tournament, but was eliminated in the semi-finals. In 1952 he competed individually in the foil category, finishing seventh. At the inaugural Mediterranean Games in 1951, held in Alexandria, Egypt, he took home three medals: silver in the team sabre and bronze in the team foil and épée.

In addition to fencing, he also played tennis and served as president of the Veterans Tennis Federation of Egypt, as well as of Al Ahly SC from 1961 through 1965. Outside of sport, Dessouki had a career in politics. He served as Governor of Cairo, an Egyptian ambassador, and as regional director of the United Nations Environment Programme and the Canadian International Development Research Centre for the Middle East and North Africa. He was also a member of the International Institute for Strategic Studies and chairman of Sinai Hotels. He died in August 2011 in Nasr City.
