= Niemeläinen =

Surname list

Niemeläinen is a Finnish surname. Notable people with the surname include:

- Ilmari Niemeläinen (1910–1951), Finnish diver and architect
- Markus Niemeläinen (born 1998), Finnish ice hockey player
