= Domenico Pace =

Domenico Pace may refer to:

- Domenico Pace (fencer)
- Domenico Pace (volleyball)
