= Fondazione Unione Sportiva Petrarca =

Italian amateur sports club

Fondazione Unione Sportiva Petrarca is an Italian amateur sports club based in Padua. The club was formed in 1912 by the Jesuits.

Although nationally and internationally the U.S. Petrarca is known mainly for its association with rugby, the club is involved with a number of other sports as well:

- Petrarca Rugby (rugby union)
- A.S. Petrarca Calcio (Association football)
- Pallacanestro Petrarca Padova (Basketball)
- Petrarca Pallavolo (Volleyball)
- Petrarca Calcio a Cinque (Futsal)
- Associazione Sportiva Petrarca Scherma (Fencing)
- Petrarca Nuoto (Swimming)
