= Vikhos =

Vikhos is a surname. Notable people with the surname include:

- Andreas Vikhos, Greek sports shooter
- Georgios Vikhos (1915–1990), Greek sports shooter
