= 1944 NCAA swimming and diving championships =

American college aquatic sports competition

- Host city: New Haven, Connecticut
- Date(s): March 1944
- Venue(s): Payne Whitney Gymnasium; Yale University
- Teams: 15
- Events: 11

The 1944 NCAA swimming and diving championships were contested in March 1944 at the Payne Whitney Gymnasium at Yale University in New Haven, Connecticut at the eighth annual NCAA-sanctioned swim meet to determine the team and individual national champions of men's collegiate swimming and diving among its member programs in the United States.

Hosts Yale topped the team standings, thus capturing the Bulldogs' second title in program history. Yale finished one point ahead of perennial power Michigan.

== Team standings ==
- (H) = Hosts
- (DC) = Defending champions
- Italics = Debut appearance

| Rank | Team | Points |
|---|---|---|
| 1st place, gold medalist(s) | Yale (H) | 39 |
| 2nd place, silver medalist(s) | Michigan | 38 |
| 3rd place, bronze medalist(s) | Navy | 24 |
| 3rd place, bronze medalist(s) | Ohio State (DC) | 24 |
| 5 | Columbia | 22 |
| 6 | Army | 14 |
| 7 | Williams | 7 |
| 8 | Brown | 6 |
| 8 | Rochester | 6 |
| 10 | Cornell | 5 |
| 11 | Bowdoin | 4 |
| 11 | Penn State | 4 |
| 11 | Princeton | 4 |
| 14 | Minnesota | 3 |
| 15 | RPI | 2 |

== Individual events ==
=== Swimming ===
| Event | Champion | Team | Time |
|---|---|---|---|
| 50-yard freestyle | Alan Ford | Yale | 22.2 |
| 100-yard freestyle | Alan Ford | Yale | 49.7 |
| 220-yard freestyle | Eugene Rogers | Columbia | 2:11.0 |
| 440-yard freestyle | Keo Nakama | Ohio State (DC) | 4:47.0 |
| 1,500-meter freestyle | Keo Nakama | Ohio State (DC) | 20:02.2 |
| 150-yard backstroke | Alan Ford | Yale | 1:36.8 |
| 200-yard butterfly | Carl Paulson | Brown | 2:28.3 |
| 400-yard freestyle relay | Merton Church; Charles Fries; William Kogen; Gurdon Pulford | Michigan (DC) | 3:35.0 |
| 300-yard medley relay | Robert Cowell; Jack Manherz; Harlie Mize | Navy | 3:01.1 |

=== Diving ===
| Event | Champion | Team | Score |
|---|---|---|---|
| One-meter diving | Charles Batterman | Columbia | 122.40 |
| Three-meter diving | Charles Batterman | Columbia | 138.56 |

== See also ==
- List of college swimming and diving teams
