= Fencing at the 1951 Mediterranean Games =

Fencing competition

- Location: Alexandria, Egypt
- Dates: October 1951

The Fencing Competition at the 1951 Mediterranean Games was held in Alexandria, Egypt.

== Medalists ==
Event	Gold	Silver	Bronze
Individual épée	René Bougnol (FRA)	Carlo Pavesi (ITA)	Jacques Coutrot (FRA)
Team épée	Italy (ITA); Armando Dellantonio; Dario Mangiarotti; Edoardo Mangiarotti; Mario Mangiarotti; Carlo Pavesi	France (FRA); René Bougnol; Jacques Coutrot; Armand Mouyal ? ?	Egypt (EGY); Osman Abdel Hafeez; Mohamed Abdel Rahman; Salah Dessouki; Mahmoud Younes ?
Individual foil	Christian d'Oriola (FRA)	Alessandro Mirandoli (ITA)	Edoardo Mangiarotti (ITA) Claude Netter (FRA)
Team foil	Italy (ITA); Nicola Dioguardi; Mario Favia; Edoardo Mangiarotti; Alessandro Mirandoli; Antonio Spallino	France (FRA); René Bougnol; Christian d'Oriola; Claude Netter; Jacques Noël; Adrien Rommel	Egypt (EGY); Osman Abdel Hafeez; Salah Dessouki; Hassan Hosni Tawfik; Mahmoud Younes ?
Individual sabre	Jacques Lefèvre (FRA)	Mauro Racca (ITA)	Roberto Ferrari (ITA)
Team sabre	Italy (ITA); Roberto Ferrari; Idalgo Masetto; Ilio Niccolini; Domenico Pace; Mauro Racca	Egypt (EGY); Mohamed Abdel Rahman; Farid Abou-Shadi; Salah Dessouki; Mahmoud Younes; Mohamed Zulficar	France (FRA); Jacques Lefèvre; Bernard Morel; Claude Netter ? ?

== Medal table ==
Rank	Nation	Gold	Silver	Bronze	Total
1	Italy (ITA)	3	3	2	8
2	France (FRA)	3	2	3	8
3	Egypt (EGY)	0	1	2	3
Totals (3 entries)		6	6	7	19
