= Manthos Kaloudis =

Greek cyclist (1911–1990)

Personal information
- Born: 1911
- Died: 1990 (aged 78–79)

Cycling career
- Sport: Cycling

Manthos Kaloudis (1911–1990) was a Greek cyclist. He competed in three events at the 1948 Summer Olympics.

== Sporting career ==
Kaloudis competed in both road bicycle racing and track cycling. He represented Greece at the 1948 Summer Olympics in London. Greece, represented by Petros Leonidis, Evangelos Kouvelis and Manthos Kaloudis, was not included in the team classification because none of its riders finished the race. In the sprint, he lost in the repechage to Mario Masanés after missing his first-round heat and being allowed to compete in the repechage. He was the only Greek cyclist to compete in track cycling at the Games.

Kaloudis became Greek national champion in the road race in 1937. In 1947, he finished second behind Petros Leonidis.
