= Duhie in Abu Dhabi =

Dhahi in Abu Dhabi (Duhie Fi Abu Dhabi)
- Directed by: Rakan
- Written by: Rakan Faisal Bin Hareez
- Starring: Ahmed Saleh; Hassan Hosni; Saeed Salem; Ahmed Al-Ansari; Malak Al-Khaldi; Abdulhamid Al-Baloushi; Mawari Abdullah; Abdullah Al-Jafali; Saeed Bu Manna
- Release date: 2016
- Country: United Arab Emirates
- Language: Arabic

Duhie in Abu Dhabi (Duhie Fi Abu Dhabi) is an Emirati comedy film released in 2016. It was written by Rakan and Faisal Bin Hareez, and directed by Rakan. The film is considered the first comedy work in the history of Emirati cinema.

== Plot ==
The film’s events unfold when the young Emirati man, Dhahi, who holds a Bachelor’s degree in Media, decides to move from Fujairah to Abu Dhabi in search of suitable employment. Having graduated from university and remained unemployed for six years, he seeks financial stability to marry his cousin, Mizoneh, with whom he shares mutual affection. However, he faces competition from a wealthy young man who also proposes to her. Following the advice of an old friend, Dhahi resolves to seek job opportunities in Abu Dhabi. During his journey, he embarks on an unexpected adventure, particularly after meeting an elderly friend who offers assistance in his employment search. The trip to Abu Dhabi proves challenging, as his rival files a false police report against him, aiming to eliminate him as a contender and marry Mizoneh without obstacles. By chance, Uncle Hosni, portrayed by Egyptian actor Hassan Hosni, happens to be present during Dhahi’s arrest, leading the police to take both for questioning. The authorities soon discover that the report is false. Upon leaving the police station, Dhahi’s life begins to change as Uncle Hosni, who has lived in Abu Dhabi for 45 years, takes him to his home and helps him search for work, highlighting the difficulties Dhahi faces in various employment settings.

== Cast ==
The Emirati comedy film features a large ensemble of actors, including:

- Ahmed Saleh, who plays the role of Dhahi, an Emirati actor known for his role as “Sultan” in the 2018 television series Al-Yasharah.
- Hassan Hosni, who portrays Uncle Hosni, a late Egyptian actor (born 1936, died 2020).
- Saeed Salem, in the role of Afreet, an Emirati actor (born 1962).
- Ahmed Al-Ansari, who plays Dhahi’s father, an Emirati actor and theatre director (born 1963).
- Malak Al-Khaldi, who portrays Mizoneh’s mother, an Emirati actress (born 1972).
- Abdulhamid Al-Baloushi, in the role of Mahdali, an Emirati actor known for works such as the play Birds Build Their Nests and the television series Reeh Al-Shamal.
- Mawari Abdullah, who plays Mizoneh, an Emirati actress known for Haddak Maddak and Bint Soughan.
- Abdullah Al-Jafali, in the role of Mizoneh’s father, an Emirati actor (born 1969), a member of Dubai National Theatre, who participated in the television series Hair Taer.
- Saeed Bu Manna, an Emirati actor and producer with several works, including Color Blindness and Papers of Love.
- Abdullah Buhajus, an Emirati actor (born 1978).
- Abdullah Bu Zaid.
- Badr Hakmi.
- Mohammed Al-Fardan.
- Sultan Al-Saif.
- Eisa Bin Arab.
