= Diving at the 1948 Summer Olympics – Men's 10 metre platform =

Men's 10 metre platform at the Games of the XIV Olympiad

Medalists
1st place, gold medalist(s)		Sammy Lee	United States
2nd place, silver medalist(s)		Bruce Harlan	United States
3rd place, bronze medalist(s)		Joaquín Capilla	Mexico

The men's 10 metre platform, also reported as highboard diving, was one of four diving events on the diving at the 1948 Summer Olympics programme.

The competition was held on Tuesday 3 August, on Wednesday 4 August, and on Thursday 5 August. It split into two sets of dives:

1. Compulsory dives
  Divers performed four pre-chosen dives (from different categories) – a running straight header forward, straight somersault backward, running straight mollberg (gainer) reverse somersault, and armstand with forward cut through.
2. Facultative dives
  Divers performed four dives of their choice (from different categories and different from the compulsory).

Twenty-five divers from 15 nations competed.

== Results ==
Rank	Diver	Nation	Points
1st place, gold medalist(s)	Sammy Lee	United States	130.05
2nd place, silver medalist(s)	Bruce Harlan	United States	122.30
3rd place, bronze medalist(s)	Joaquín Capilla	Mexico	113.52
4	Lennart Brunnhage	Sweden	108.62
5	Peter Heatly	Great Britain	105.29
6	Thomas Christiansen	Denmark	105.22
7	Raymond Mulinghausen	France	103.01
8	George Athans	Canada	100.91
9	Rolf Stigersand	Norway	97.93
10	Zouheir Shourbagi	Syria	97.81
11	Louis Marchant	Great Britain	96.11
12	Kamal Ali Hassan	Egypt	95.33
13	Diego Mariscal	Mexico	95.14
14	Gustavo Somohano	Mexico	91.98
15	Franz Worisch	Austria	90.05
16	Haroldo Mariano	Brazil	90.00
17	Wilhelm Lippa	Austria	89.04
18	Gordon Ward	Great Britain	88.96
19	Ilmari Niemeläinen	Finland	87.82
20	Guy Hernandez	France	87.46
21	Geoff Mandy	South Africa	86.00
22	Rauf Abu Al-Seoud	Egypt	85.85
23	Willy Rist	Switzerland	81.78
24	Mohamed Abdel Khalek Allam	Egypt	77.92
25	Ernst Strupler	Switzerland	77.67

== Sources ==
- Organising Committee for the XIV Olympiad London 1948 (1951). "The Official Report of the Organising Committee for the XIV Olympiad London 1948" (pdf). Organising Committee for the XIV Olympiad London 1948. pp. pp.637–9.
- Herman de Wael (26 January 2001). "Diving - men's platform (London 1948)".
