= Leonidis =

Leonidis (Greek: Λεωνίδης) is a Greek surname. Notable people with the surname include:

- Petros Leonidis, former cyclist
- Valerios Leonidis (1966), former Olympic medalist weightlifter and current weightlifting trainer
