= Wally Wolf =

American swimmer and water polo player (1930–1997)

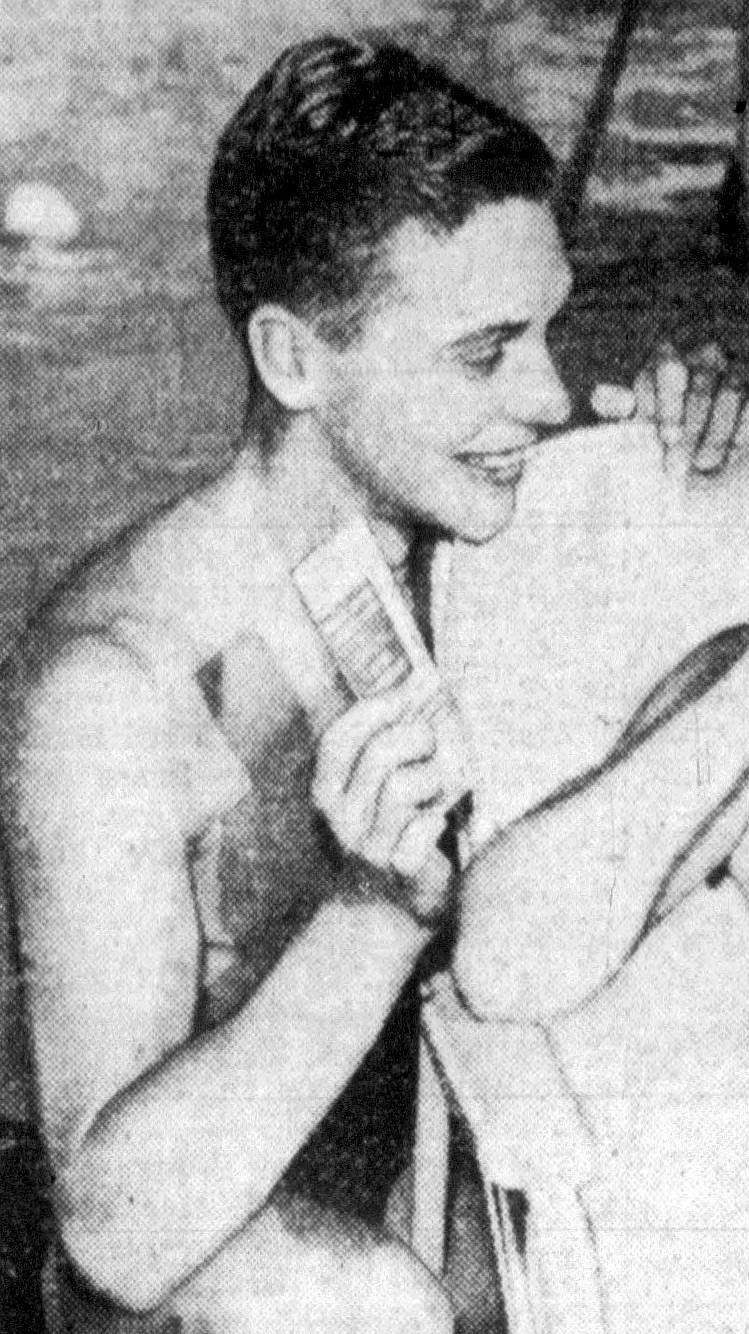
- Wolf, circa 1949

Personal information
- Full name: Wallace Perry Wolf Jr.
- Nickname: "Wally"
- National team: United States
- Born: October 2, 1930 Los Angeles, California, U.S.
- Died: March 12, 1997 (aged 66) Santa Ynez, California, U.S.
- Height: 5 ft 11 in (1.80 m)
- Weight: 176 lb (80 kg)

Sport
- Sport: Swimming
- Strokes: Freestyle, water polo
- Club: Lynwood Swim Club
- College team: University of Southern California
Medal record
Men's swimming
Representing the United States
Olympic Games
Gold medal – first place	1948 London	4x200 m freestyle relay
Amateur Athletic Union
Bronze medal – third place	1951 Indoor Championships	300 yd Individual Medley
Silver medal – second place	1950 Outdoor Championships	300 yd Individual Medley
Silver medal – second place	1949 Outdoor Championships	300 yd Individual Medley
NCAA
Silver medal – second place	1951 Championships	150 yd Individual Medley

Wallace "Wally" Perry Wolf Jr. (October 2, 1930 – March 12, 1997) was an American attorney, bank director, competition swimmer, water polo player, and Olympic champion. He competed in the 1948, 1952, 1956, and 1960 Summer Olympics.

== Personal life ==
Wolf was born in Los Angeles, California, and was Jewish. He was the son of famous vaudeville music director Rube Wolf Sr. and Fanchonnette Sunny (Rutherford) Wolf. One of the early teams he swam for was the Rube Wolf Swim Club of Los Angeles. He married Carolyn Wyatt and had three children - Wallace Scott, John, and Lori, and the family lived in Manhattan Beach, California. After completing his swimming career he attended USC Law School and became a successful Los Angeles attorney, often to the entertainment industry. He was a co-founder of Los Padres Savings Bank and had served in various capacities including Corporate Director beginning in 1984.

A Californian most of his life, he died on March 12, 1997, in Santa Yanez, California, with memorial services held at St. Mark's Episcopal Church in Los Osos. In a suspected mishap, his body was found at the bottom of a bridge at San Marcos Pass being retrofitted for an earthquake. He was 66.

== Athletic career ==
Wolf excelled at several strokes and events. At Beverly Hills High School (class of 1947), at a race distance which has long since been discontinued, he won the California Interscholastic Federation (CIF) 220y-freestyle championship three years in a row, 1945-47 (with times of 2:32.2, 2:23.7, and 2:19.1), the individual medley - 75 yards two years in a row, 1946-47 (with times of 45.7 and 44.4), and was the CIF record holder in 220y-freestyle and individual medley.

=== Setting 1948 Gold medal 4X200 Olympic relay record of 8:48 ===
With the pinnacle of his athletic career coming at only 17, he represented the United States at the 1948 Olympics in London, taking a gold medal while impressively setting a world record total relay time of 8:46 in the men's 4×200-meter freestyle relay . Wolf told the press winning the gold medal was "the biggest thrill of my life", and "the toughest competition I was ever in." Around July 1948, prior to the Olympics, at the 1948 US Olympic trials 4x200-meter freestyle relay held in Detroit, several swimmers who had already qualified in other events slowed down in their heats or swam fast in the prelims and scratched themselves for the final to allow more swimmers to qualify for the US Olympic Team. The final four were not officially selected until the Olympic trials in London. Significantly, he was the top qualifier in the 4×200-meter freestyle relay trials final with a time of 2:14 flat.

Apparently the 4x200 relay team had considerable depth that year. Coach Robert Kiphuth held a time trial shortly after the actual Olympic trials with 11 of the swimmers, which had Jimmy McLane as first overall with a time of 2:11.0, Bill Smith and Wally Wolf in 2:11.2, and Wally Ris in 2:12.4. This quartet was used for the Olympic final and won the gold medal. The next four-Eugene Rogers in 2:14.2, Edwin Gilbert in 2:15.4, Robert Gibe in 2:15.6, and William Dudley in 2:15.9, were used in the Olympic prelims. The next three swimmers-Joe Verdeur who came in 2:16.3, Alan Ford in 2:16.4 and George Hoogerhyde in 2:17.4 were not used in the 4x200 freestyle relay.

=== 1952 4x200 Olympic relay team ===
Four years later at the 1952 Olympics in Helsinki, Finland, Wolf once again was the top qualifier in the 4x200-meter freestyle relay at the US Olympic trials. Like the trials in 1948, several top swimmers who had qualified for other events (Ford Konno, Clarke Scholes, William Woolsey, Wayne Moore and Jimmy McLane) swam below their potential in the trials and failed to qualify for the final. Coach Matt Mann used four of the swimmers who actually qualified in the trials for the Olympic prelim. He swam a second heat leg setting a new Olympic record of 2:11.4. For the final, Mann used Konno, Woolsey, Moore, and McLane who won the gold medal. Wolf helped the U.S. relay team to qualify for the final of the men's 4×200-meter freestyle relay, but, under the international swimming rule of the time, he was not awarded with a medal because he did not swim in the event final.

Wolf attended the University of Southern California (USC), where he swam for the USC Trojans swimming and diving team in National Collegiate Athletic Association (NCAA) competition and was a four-time All American. He graduated from USC with a bachelor's degree in 1951, and later returned to USC Law School to earn a law degree in 1957.

=== 1956, 1960 Summer olympics in Water Polo ===
Wolf was a member of the U.S. men's team that finished fifth in the 1956 water polo tournament in Melbourne, Australia, playing in five matches. Four years later at the 1960 Olympics in Rome, he finished seventh with the U.S. men's water polo team in the 1960 tournament. He played all seven matches and scored five goals. He was named to the 1964 Olympics US water polo team, but did not accept the appointment.

== Honors ==
In 1976, he was inducted into the USA Water Polo Hall of Fame, in 2008 the Southern California Jewish Sports Hall of Fame, and in 2009, the USC Athletic Hall of Fame. He was inducted into the Beverly Hills High Athletes Hall of Fame in 2011, and the International Jewish Sports Hall of Fame in 2014. In Water Polo, he was a 1960 AAU All American Selection, and in 1951-2, an All PAC 8 selection while a student the University of Southern California.

== See also ==
- List of Olympic medalists in swimming (men)
- List of University of Southern California people
- World record progression 4 × 200 metres freestyle relay
- List of select Jewish swimmers
