= Géza Kádas =

Hungarian swimmer (1926–1979)

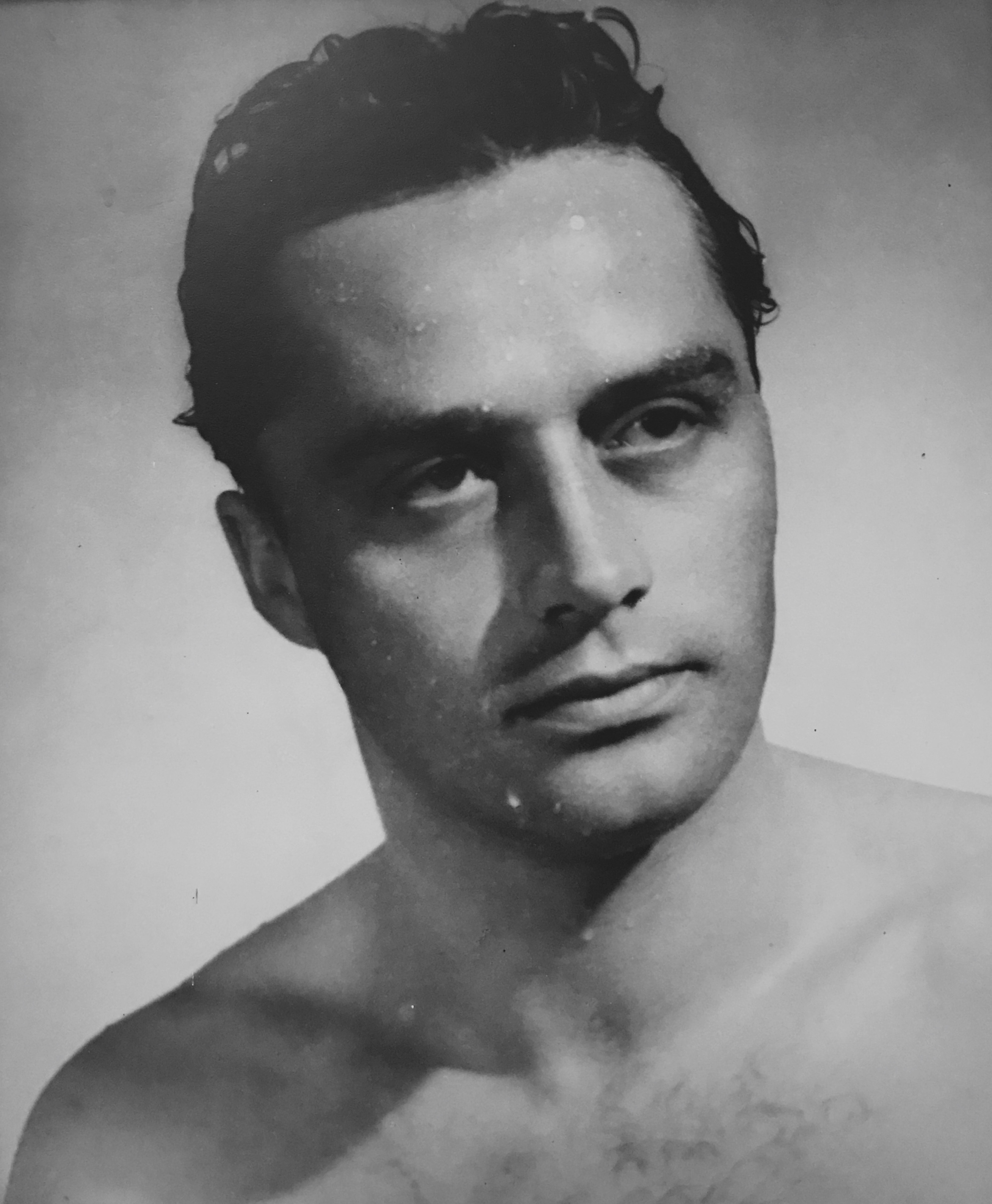

Personal information
- Born: 7 August 1926 Eger, Hungary
- Died: 6 March 1979 (aged 52) Budapest, Hungary

Sport
- Sport: Swimming
Medal record
Representing Hungary
Olympic Games
Silver medal – second place	1948 London	4x200 m freestyle
Bronze medal – third place	1948 London	100 m freestyle
European Championships
Gold medal – first place	1954 Turin	4×200 m freestyle
Bronze medal – third place	1947 Monte Carlo	4×200 m freestyle
Bronze medal – third place	1954 Turin	100 m freestyle

Géza Kádas (7 August 1926 – 6 March 1979) was a Hungarian swimmer and Olympic medalist. He participated at the 1948 and 1952 Summer Olympics, winning a silver medal in 4 × 200 metre freestyle relay, and a bronze medal in 100 metre freestyle in 1948. Kádas died in Budapest on 6 March 1979, at the age of 52.
