= Poland at the 2028 Summer Olympics =

- IOC code: POL
- NOC: Polish Olympic Committee
- Website: olimpijski.pl (in Polish)

in Los Angeles, United States 14 July 2028 – 30 July 2028
- Competitors: 12 in 1 sport
- Medals: Gold 0 Silver 0 Bronze 0 Total 0

Summer Olympics appearances (overview)
- 1924; 1928; 1932; 1936; 1948; 1952; 1956; 1960; 1964; 1968; 1972; 1976; 1980; 1984; 1988; 1992; 1996; 2000; 2004; 2008; 2012; 2016; 2020; 2024; 2028

Other related appearances
- Russian Empire (1900, 1912); Austria (1908–1912)

Poland will compete at the 2028 Summer Olympics in Los Angeles from 14 to 30 July 2028. Polish athletes have appeared in every edition of the Summer Olympic Games from 1924 onwards, except for the 1984 Summer Olympics because of the Soviet boycott.

== Competitors ==
The following is the list of number of competitors in the Games.

Sport	Men	Women	Total
Volleyball	12	0	12
Total	12	0	12

== Volleyball ==
=== Indoor ===
Summary

Team	Event	Group stage				Quarterfinal	Semifinal	Final / BM	
Team	Event	Opposition Score	Opposition Score	Opposition Score	Rank	Opposition Score	Opposition Score	Opposition Score	Rank
Poland men's	Men's tournament	–	–	–					

==== Men's tournament ====
Poland men's volleyball team qualified as the winner of the 2026 Men's European Volleyball Championship.

== See also ==
- Poland at the 2028 Winter Youth Olympics
- Poland at the 2028 Summer Paralympics
