= Horacio White =

Argentine swimmer

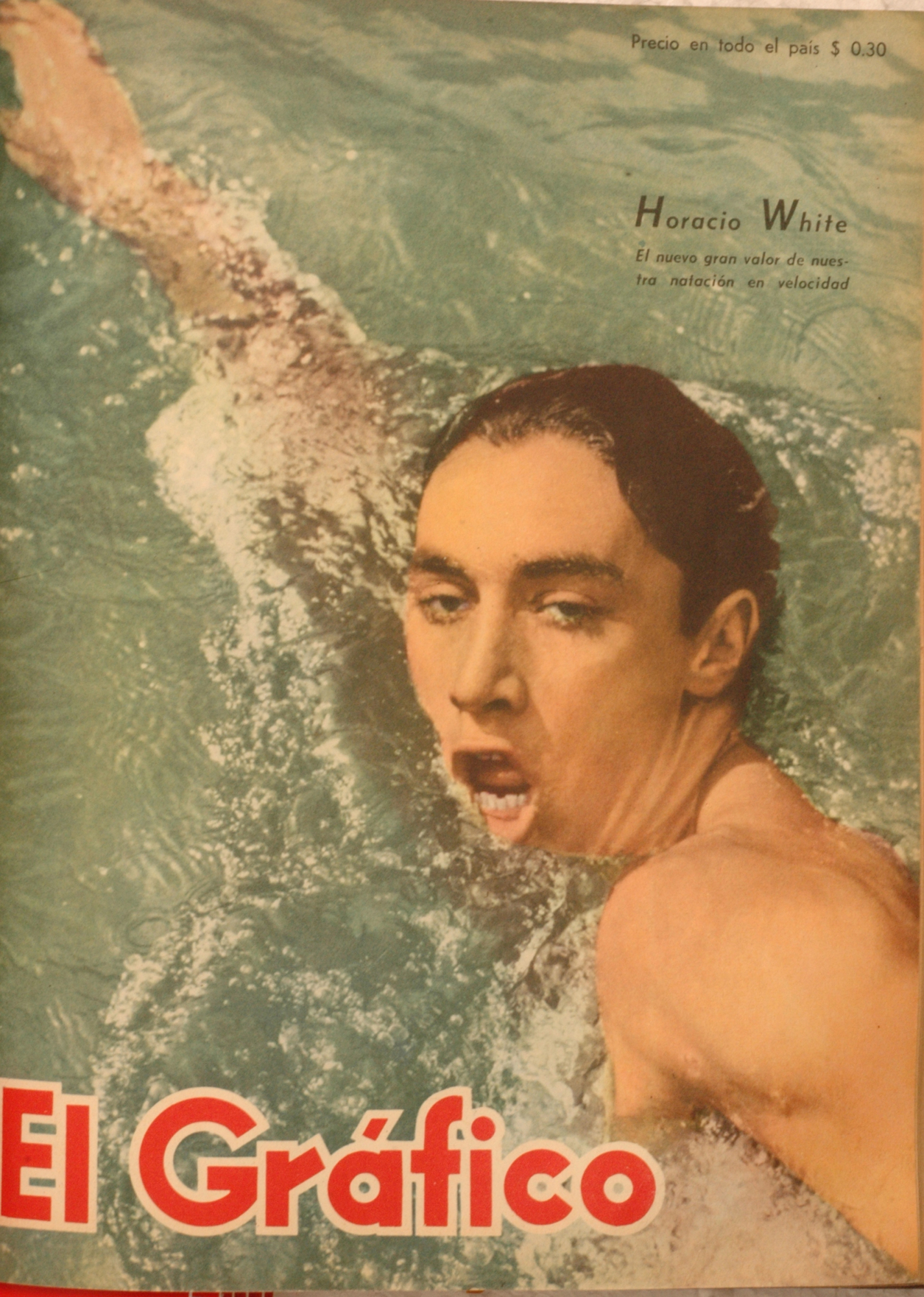
- Horacio White on the cover of El Gráfico

Personal information
- Full name: Horacio Rodolfo White
- Nationality: Argentina
- Born: 2 April 1927 Rosario, Santa Fe
- Died: 26 August 2017 (aged 90) Paraná, Entre Ríos

Sport
- Sport: Swimming
- Strokes: Freestyle

Horacio White (April 2, 1927 – August 26, 2017) was an Argentine swimmer who competed at the 1948 Summer Olympics in the 100 m freestyle and 4 × 200 m freestyle relay, reaching the final in the latter and coming 6th.
