= Willy Rist =

Swiss diver (1912–1996)

Personal information
- Full name: Wilhelm Rist
- Nationality: Swiss
- Born: 6 February 1912 Basel, Switzerland
- Died: 27 February 1996 (aged 84)

Sport
- Sport: Diving

Wilhelm Rist (6 February 1912 – 27 February 1996) was a Swiss diver. He competed in the men's 10 metre platform event at the 1948 Summer Olympics. Rist died on 27 February 1996, at the age of 84.
