= Gustavo Somohano =

Mexican diver

Personal information
- Full name: Gustavo Adolfo Somohano Winfield
- Born: 3 April 1925; Monterrey, Mexico
- Died: 30 September 2004 (aged 79); Monterrey, Mexico

Sport
- Sport: Diving

Gustavo Adolfo Somohano Winfield (Note: In this Spanish name, the first or paternal surname is Somohano and the second or maternal family name is Winfield.) (3 April 1925 – 30 September 2004) was a Mexican diver. He competed in the men's 10 metre platform event at the 1948 Summer Olympics.
