= Ronald Stedman =

British swimmer (1927–2022)

Personal information
- Born: 3 June 1927 Beckenham, Kent, England
- Died: 16 October 2022 (aged 95)

Sport
- Sport: Swimming

Ronald Edwin Stedman (3 June 1927 – 16 October 2022) was a British swimmer. He competed in the men's 100 metre freestyle at the 1948 Summer Olympics. He won the 1948 and 1949 ASA National Championship 100 metres freestyle title.

Stedman died on 16 October 2022, at the age of 95.
