= Dilip Mitra =

Indian swimmer (1926–1992)

Personal information
- Full name: Dilip Mitra
- Nationality: Indian
- Born: 1926
- Died: 1992 (aged 65–66)
- Spouse: Late. Reba Mitra
- SWIMMING FEDERATION OF INDIA

Sport
- Sport: Swimming
- Strokes: Free Style
- Club: National Swimming Association

Dilip Mitra (1926–1992) was an Indian swimmer. He competed in the men's 100 metre freestyle at the 1948 Summer Olympics.
