= Augusto Cantón =

Argentine swimmer

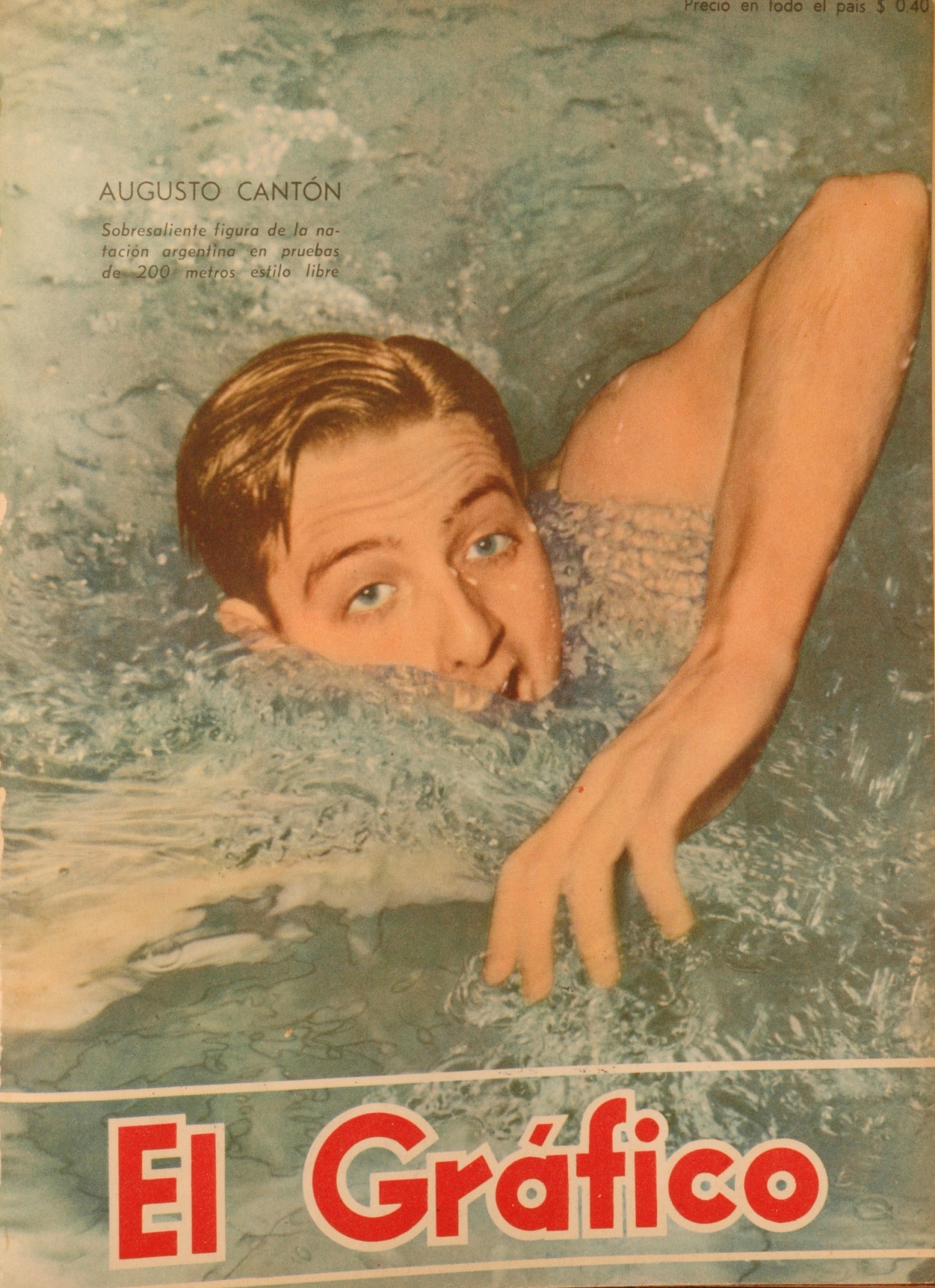

Personal information
- Nickname: Babu
- Nationality: Argentina
- Born: 27 November 1928
- Died: 3 February 1991 (aged 62)

Sport
- Sport: Swimming
- Strokes: Freestyle

Augusto Luis Cantón Portugal (27 November 1928 – 3 February 1991) was an Argentine swimmer who competed at the 1948 Summer Olympics in the 100 m freestyle and 4 × 200 m freestyle relay, reaching the final in the latter and coming 6th .
