= Rolf Stigersand =

Norwegian diver

Personal information
- Full name: Rolf Mørck Stigersand
- Nickname: Brumle
- Nationality: Norwegian
- Born: 7 December 1916; Kristiania, Norway
- Died: 21 June 2006 (aged 89)

Sport
- Sport: Diving

Rolf Mørck Stigersand (7 December 1916 – 21 June 2006) was a Norwegian sports diver. He was born in Kristiania, Norway. He competed at the 1948 Summer Olympics in London, where he placed ninth in 10 metre platform.
