= James Flynn (fencer) =

American fencer (1907–2000)

Personal information
- Born: James Hummitzsch Flynn; August 8, 1907 Paterson, New Jersey, U.S.
- Died: August 15, 2000 (aged 93) West Orange, New Jersey, U.S.

Sport
- Sport: Fencing
Medal record
Men's fencing
Representing United States
Olympic Games
Bronze medal – third place	1948 London	Sabre, team

James Hummitzsch Flynn (August 8, 1907 – August 15, 2000) was an American fencer. He won a bronze medal in the team sabre event at the 1948 Summer Olympics.

== See also ==
- List of USFA Division I National Champions
