= Raúl García (swimmer) =

Cuban swimmer (1930–2020)

Raoúl García-Vidal
Personal information
- Born: 9 April 1930 Havana, Cuba
- Died: 30 August 2020 (aged 90) Miami, FL

Sport
- Sport: Swimming

Raoúl García-Vidal (9 April 1930 – 30 August 2020) was a Cuban swimmer. He competed in the men's 100 metre freestyle at the 1948 Summer Olympics.
