= Geoff Mandy =

South African diver

Personal information
- Nationality: South African
- Born: 28 December 1919; Uitenhage, Union of South Africa
- Died: 28 May 1994 (aged 74); Port Elizabeth, South Africa

Sport
- Sport: Diving

Geoff Mandy (28 December 1919 – 28 May 1994) was a South African diver. He competed in the men's 10 metre platform event at the 1948 Summer Olympics.
