= Claude Netter =

French fencer (1924–2007)

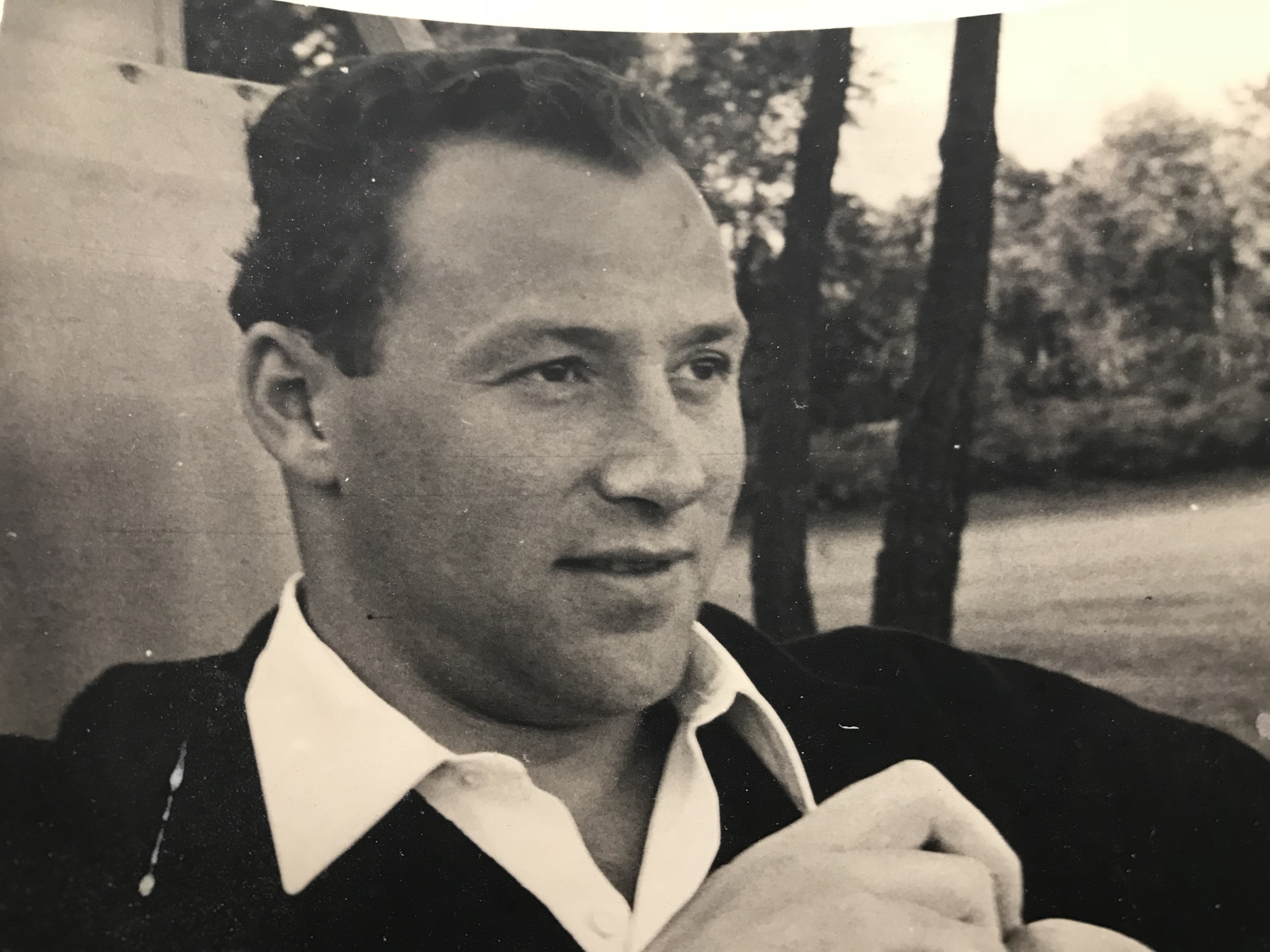

Personal information
- Born: 23 October 1924 Paris, France
- Died: 13 June 2007 (aged 82)

Sport
- Sport: Fencing
Medal record
Men's fencing
Representing France
Olympic Games
Gold medal – first place	1952 Helsinki	Team foil
Silver medal – second place	1956 Melbourne	Team foil
Mediterranean Games
Silver medal – second place	1951 Alexandria	Team foil
Bronze medal – third place	1951 Alexandria	Individual foil
Bronze medal – third place	1951 Alexandria	Team sabre

Claude Netter (23 October 1924, in Paris, France – 13 June 2007) was a French Olympic champion foil fencer.

Netter competed in three Olympiads for the French foil team, winning two medals. Netter was Jewish.

== Fencing career ==
=== French Championships ===
Netter was the French national foil champion in 1952.

=== World Championships ===
Netter was a member of the French team that won the gold medal at the World Championships in 1951, 1953 and 1958. In 1959 he won silver at the World Championships in the individual foil competition.

=== Olympics ===
Netter won a gold medal in team foil at the 1952 Summer Olympics in Helsinki. The French team defeated Egypt (15–1), Hungary (12–4), and Italy (8–6) in the finals.

He won a silver medal in team foil in the 1956 Summer Olympics in Melbourne and placed 6th in individual foil.

Netter's final Olympic appearance was in Rome at the 1960 Summer Olympics in the team foil competition. The French team placed 5th.

=== Mediterranean Games ===
He competed at the 1951 Mediterranean Games where he won a silver medal in the team foil event and bronze medals in the individual foil and team sabre events.

== See also ==
- List of select Jewish fencers
- List of Jewish Olympic medalists
