= Fernand Martinaux =

French swimmer

Personal information
- Full name: Fernand Martinaux
- Nationality: France
- Born: 29 September 1928
- Died: 15 March 2017 (aged 88)

Sport
- Sport: Swimming
- Club: AVIA CLUB - C.N. PARIS - RACING CLUB DE FRANCE

Fernand Martinaux (29 September 1928 – 15 March 2017) was a French swimmer. He competed in the men's 100 metre freestyle at the 1948 Summer Olympics.

== NATATION ==
1948 J.O. à LONDRES 100 N.L. 20ème

1953 Championnats de France à Dijon 4 X 200 N.L. 1er 9'33'5 Composition du relais: Aldo EMINENTE-Fernand MARTINAUX-Jo BERNARDO-Roger PERRIQUET

1954 Championnats de France à BELLERIVE 4 X 200 N.L. 1er 9'37'9 Composition du relais: Aldo EMINENTE-Fernand MARTINAUX-Jo BERNARDO-Roger PERRIQUET

1955 Championnats de France à PARIS 4 X 200 N.L. 1er 9'37'2 Composition du relais: Aldo EMINENTE-Fernand MARTINAUX-Jo BERNARDO-Roger PERRIQUET

1961 Championnat de France de sauvetage Toutes épreuves 1er
