= Eugene Rogers =

American Olympic swimmer (1924–2017)

Personal information
- Full name: Eugene Roy Rogers
- Nickname: "Gene"
- National team: United States
- Born: February 17, 1924 New York City, U.S.
- Died: December 30, 2017 (aged 93)

Sport
- Sport: Swimming
- Strokes: Freestyle
- Club: New York Athletic Club
- College team: Columbia University
Medal record
Men's swimming
NCAA
Gold medal – first place	New Haven 1944	220-yard freestyle
Gold medal – first place	Ann Arbor 1945	220-yard freestyle

Eugene Roy Rogers (February 17, 1924 – December 30, 2017) was an American competition swimmer who represented the United States at the 1948 Summer Olympics in London. He swam for the gold medal-winning U.S. team in the preliminary heats of the men's 4×200-meter freestyle relay.

At the US Olympic trials of the 1948 4x200-meter freestyle relay, several swimmers who had already qualified in other events slowed down in their heats or swam fast in the prelims and scratched themselves for the final to allow more swimmers to qualify for the US Olympic Team.

Ultimately, coach Robert Kiphuth did hold a time trial shortly after the actual trials with eleven of the swimmers. This time trial had Jimmy McLane as first overall with a time of 2:11.0, Bill Smith and Wally Wolf in 2:11.2, and Wally Ris in 2:12.4. This quartet was used for the Olympic final. The next four-Eugene Rogers in 2:14.2, Edwin Gilbert in 2:15.4, Robert Gibe in 2:15.6, and William Dudley in 2:15.9, were used in the Olympic prelims. The next three swimmers-Joe Verdeur who came in 2:16.3, Alan Ford in 2;16.4 and George Hoogerhyde in 2:17.4 were not used in any capacity in the 4x200 freestyle relay.

Rogers did not receive a medal, however, because under the Olympic swimming rules in effect in 1948, only those relay swimmers who competed in the event final were medal-eligible. He was inducted into The Columbia University Athletics Hall of Fame. He died in 2017 at the age of 93.

== See also ==
- List of Columbia University alumni
