= Wally Ris =

American swimmer (1924–1989)

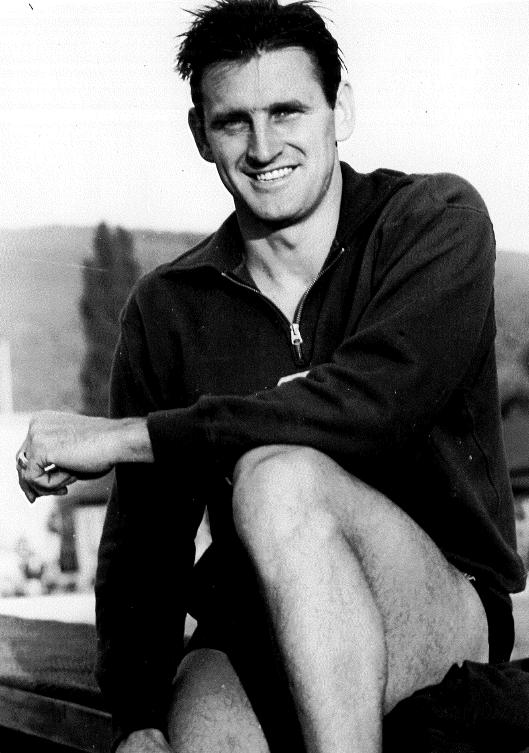

Personal information
- Full name: Walter Steven Ris
- Nickname: "Wally"
- National team: United States
- Born: January 4, 1924 Chicago, Illinois, U.S.
- Died: December 25, 1989 (aged 65) Mission Viejo, California, U.S.
- Spouse: Virginia Lee Ris
- Children: 4

Sport
- Sport: Swimming
- Strokes: Freestyle
- Club: Chicago Town Club
- College team: University of Iowa
- Coach: David Armbruster (U. of Iowa)
Medal record
Men's swimming
Representing United States
Olympic Games
| Gold medal – first place | 1948 London | 100 m freestyle |
| Gold medal – first place | 1948 London | 4×200 m freestyle relay |
Representing Iowa
NCAA
| Gold medal – first place | 1948 Ann Arbor | 100-yard freestyle |
| Gold medal – first place | 1949 Chapel Hill | 100-yard freestyle |

Walter Steven Ris (January 4, 1924 – December 25, 1989) was an American competition swimmer, two-time Olympic champion, and world record-holder.

He was born one of three brothers in Chicago, Illinois to Russian immigrant parents on January 4, 1924.

Ris was a star swimmer at Crane Technical High in Chicago. He attended the University of Iowa, where he was a member of the Iowa Beta chapter of Sigma Alpha Epsilon and swam for the Iowa Hawkeyes swimming and diving team in National Collegiate Athletic Association (NCAA) and Big Ten Conference competition from 1947 to 1949. At Iowa, where he graduated in 1949, he was mentored and trained by Hall of Fame Coach David Armbruster, and was the NCAA national champion in the 100-yard freestyle in 1948 and 1949.

== 1948 Olympic trials ==
At the US Olympic trials of the 1948 4x200-meter freestyle relay, several swimmers who had already qualified in other events slowed down in their heats or swam fast in the prelims and scratched themselves for the final to allow more swimmers to qualify for the US Olympic Team.

Ultimately, coach Robert Kiphuth did hold a time trial shortly after the actual trials with eleven of the swimmers. This time trial had Jimmy McLane as first overall with a time of 2:11.0, Bill Smith and Wally Wolf in 2:11.2, and Wally Ris in 2:12.4. This quartet was used for the Olympic final. The next four-Eugene Rogers in 2:14.2, Edwin Gilbert in 2:15.4, Robert Gibe in 2:15.6, and William Dudley in 2:15.9, were used in the Olympic prelims. The next three swimmers-Joe Verdeur who came in 2:16.3, Alan Ford in 2;16.4 and George Hoogerhyde in 2:17.4 were not used in any capacity in the 4x200 freestyle relay.

== 1948 London Olympics ==
Ris won two gold medals at the 1948 Summer Olympics in London, England. He received his first gold medal as a member of the winning U.S. team in the men's 4×200-meter freestyle relay, and set a new world record of 8:46.0 with American teammates Jimmy McLane, Wally Wolf, and Bill Smith.

In individual competition, he won a second gold in the men's 100-meter freestyle (57.3), finishing a half-second ahead of U.S. teammate Alan Ford (57.8).

=== Honors ===
Ris was inducted into the International Swimming Hall of Fame as an "Honor Swimmer" in 1966. He is a member of the Helms Hall of Fame, and the Iowa Hall of Fame.

Ris died of a heart attack in his home in Mission Viejo, California on December 25, 1989. He was survived by his wife Virginia Lee Ris, two sons and two daughters.

== See also ==
- List of members of the International Swimming Hall of Fame
- List of multiple Olympic gold medalists at a single Games
- List of Olympic medalists in swimming (men)
- List of University of Iowa people
- World record progression 4 × 200 metres freestyle relay
