= Warren Boyd (swimmer) =

Australian swimmer

Personal information
- Born: 23 December 1926 Sydney, Australia
- Died: 17 December 2018 (aged 91)

Sport
- Sport: Swimming
- Strokes: freestyle
- Club: Manly Swimming Club

Warren Boyd (23 December 1926 – 17 December 2018) was an Australian swimmer. He competed in the men's 100 metre freestyle at the 1948 Summer Olympics.
