= Zoltán Szilárd =

Hungarian swimmer (1930–2015)

Personal information
- Full name: Zoltán Miklos Szilárd II
- Nationality: Hungarian
- Born: 10 October 1930 Budapest, Hungary
- Died: 20 March 2015 (aged 84) Hesperia, California, U.S.

Sport
- Sport: Swimming

Zoltán Szilárd (10 October 1930 – 20 March 2015) was a Hungarian swimmer. He competed in the men's 100 metre freestyle at the 1948 Summer Olympics.
