= Haroldo Mariano =

Brazilian diver

Personal information
- Born: 22 August 1928; São Paulo, Brazil
- Died: 1997 (aged 68–69)

Sport
- Sport: Diving

Haroldo Mariano (22 August 1928 – 1997) was a Brazilian diver. He competed in the men's 10 metre platform event at the 1948 Summer Olympics.
