= Ilmari Niemeläinen =

Finnish architect and diver

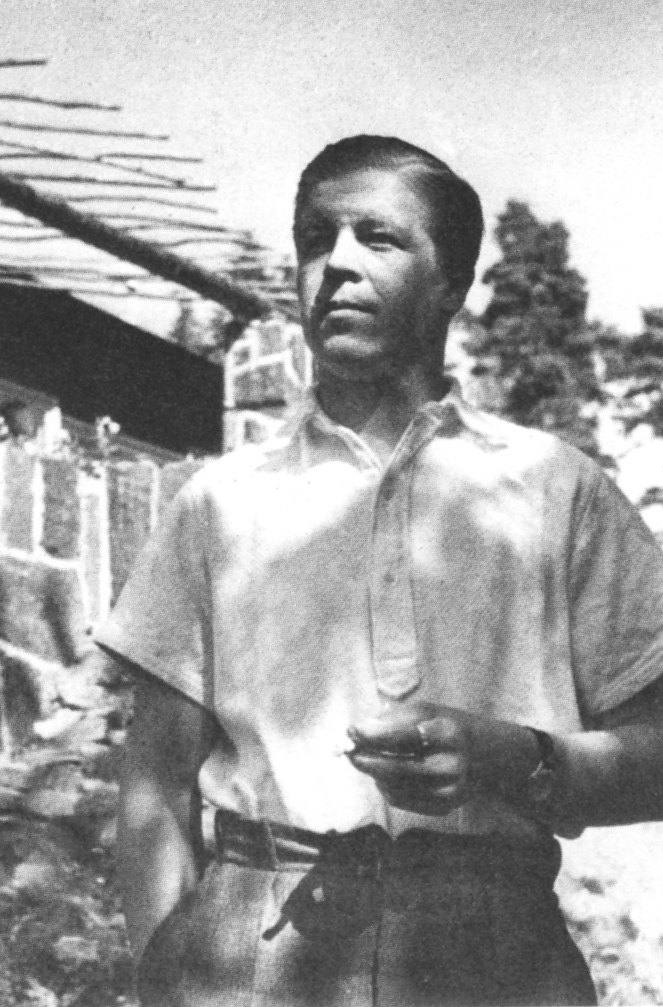
- Ilmari Niemeläinen in the late 1940s

Personal information
- Born: December 16, 1910 Jyväskylä, Finland
- Died: May 28, 1951 (aged 40) Helsinki, Finland

Sport
- Sport: Diving
Medal record
Representing Finland
Olympic Games
Bronze medal – third place	1948 London	Town planning

Heikki Ilmari "Immu" Niemeläinen (Finnish pronunciation: [ˈilmɑri ˈnie̯melæi̯nen]; December 16, 1910 – May 28, 1951) was a Finnish diver and architect. He was born in and died in Helsinki.

At the 1936 Summer Olympics in Berlin he finished 13th in the 3 metre springboard event and 14th in the 10 metre platform competition. Twelve years later, at the 1948 Summer Olympics in London he finished 19th in the 10 metre platform event.

Art competitions formed part of the modern Olympic Games during its early years, from 1912 to 1948. In 1948, at the London Olympics, Niemeläinen won a bronze medal for his "Athletic Centre in Kemi, Finland".
