= Bruce Bourke =

Australian swimmer (1929–2023)

Personal information
- Born: 5 February 1929 Brighton-Le-Sands, New South Wales, Australia
- Died: 21 June 2023 (aged 94)

Sport
- Sport: Swimming
- Strokes: backstroke, freestyle

Bruce Bourke (5 February 1929 – 21 June 2023) was an Australian swimmer. He competed in two events at the 1948 Summer Olympics.

His son Glenn Bourke competed in sailing at the 1980 and 1992 Summer Olympics.
