= Ali Mustafa Baghdady =

Egyptian Air Force commander

Ali Ahmed Mustafa Baghdady
- علي مصطفى بغدادي
- Born: 4 December 1922; Cairo, Egypt
- Died: 2 February 2005 (aged 82); Cairo, Egypt
- Military career
- Allegiance: Egypt
- Branch: Egyptian Air Force
- Rank: Major-General
- Conflicts: 1948 Arab–Israeli War; Suez Crisis; Six-Day War
- Other work: Sportsman, Artist

Ali Ahmed Mustafa Baghdady (Arabic: علي مصطفى بغدادي) (4 December 1922 – 2 February 2005) was the Egyptian Air Force commander from 1969 to 1972. He was also an Olympic swimmer and water polo player, and competed in the London 1948 Olympics. He died in January 2005 due to complications of a stroke.

== Early life and family ==
Ali Baghdady was born in Cairo, Egypt, to parents Mustafa and Nabaweya. His father ran the Egyptian Post office until the early 1960s. He had three brothers: the late Adli, a prominent judge and deputy minister of justice, the late Ibrahim, the governor of Cairo and intelligence officer, and the late Hassan, an engineer and executive of the Egyptian national sugar factories. His sisters were Nadia, Fayza and Nehal. In 1951 he married Seyada Mashour, and with her he had three sons: Amr, Essam and Tarek.

== Education and military career ==
He attended the Tawfikeya school in Shubra, Cairo, where he gained a baccalaureate degree. He then joined the Military Academy and graduated as an officer in the Egyptian Armed forces. He then joined the Air Force academy and progressed his career as an officer and pilot in the Egyptian Air Force. He served under King Farouk, President Gamal Abdel Nasser and President Anwar Sadat. In 1969 General Baghdady was appointed the Commander of the Egyptian Air Force (while it was part of the United Arab Republic Air Force). In 1972 he was succeeded by Hosni Mubarak (who was later to become president of Egypt) as the Commander of the air force. In October 2016 he was posthumously promoted to the rank of lieutenant general by Egyptian President Abdel Fattah el-Sisi.

== Sport ==
Ali Baghdady was Egypt's short distance swimming champion and captain of the national water polo team. He represented his country at the 1948 London Olympics. In the 1970s he was also President of the Egyptian squash association, and later went on to play tennis in the over 40s category.

=== Olympic participation ===
Baghdady participated in the following events at the 1948 Summer Olympics for Egypt:

- Men's 100 metres Freestyle - Scored 4th of 6 in Round One Heat Three
- Men's 4 × 200 metres Freestyle Relay - Scored 7th of 7 in Round One Heat Two

== Art ==
Ali Baghdady was a keen artist and carpenter, and was tutored in the 1950s by Italian artist Menotti in oil painting.

Military offices
Preceded by Mustafa Shalaby El Hennawy	Commander of the Egyptian Air Force; 1969 – 1972	Succeeded by Hosni Mubarak
