= Georg Loisel =

Austrian fencer

Personal information
- Born: 1 June 1957 (age 69)

Sport
- Sport: Fencing

Georg Loisel (born 1 June 1957) is an Austrian fencer. He competed in the team foil event at the 1984 Summer Olympics. His father, Hubert Loisel, also fenced at the Olympics for Austria.
