= Domenico Pace (fencer) =

Italian fencer (1924–2022)

Personal information
- Born: 9 July 1924 Padua, Italy
- Died: 16 August 2022 (aged 98) Milan, Italy

Sport
- Sport: Fencing
Medal record
Mediterranean Games
| Gold medal – first place | 1951 Alexandria | Team sabre |

Domenico Pace (9 July 1924 – 16 August 2022) was an Italian fencer. He competed in the team sabre event at the 1956 Summer Olympics. He also competed at the 1951 Mediterranean Games where he won a gold medal in the team sabre event.
