= Martin Lundén =

Swedish swimmer (1925–2011)

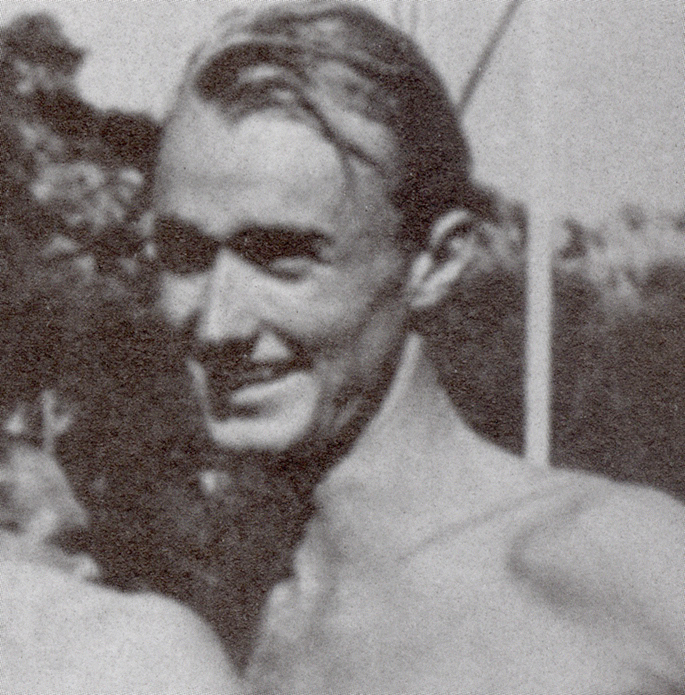

Personal information
- Full name: Karl Martin Lundén
- Nationality: Swedish
- Born: 1 January 1925 By, Avesta Municipality, Sweden
- Died: 14 February 2011 (aged 86) Sollentuna, Stockholm, Sweden

Sport
- Sport: Swimming
- Strokes: Freestyle, backstroke
- Club: SK Neptun, Stockholm
Medal record
Representing Sweden
European Championships
Gold medal – first place	1947 Monte Carlo	4×200 m freestyle

Karl Martin Lundén (1 January 1925 – 14 February 2011) was a Swedish swimmer who won the 4 × 200 m freestyle European title in 1947. He competed at the 1948 Summer Olympics in the 100 m backstroke and 100 m and 4 × 200 m freestyle events and finished fourth in the relay.
