= Alan Ford (swimmer) =

American swimmer (1923–2008)

Personal information
- Full name: Alan Robert Ford
- National team: United States
- Born: December 7, 1923 Panama Canal Zone, Panama, U.S.
- Died: November 3, 2008 (aged 84) Sarasota, Florida
- Height: 5 ft 9 in (1.75 m)
- Weight: 170 lb (77 kg)

Sport
- Sport: Swimming
- Strokes: Freestyle
- College team: Yale University
Medal record
Men's swimming
Representing the United States
Olympic Games
| Silver medal – second place | 1948 London | 100 m freestyle |
Amateur Athletic Union
| Gold medal – first place | 1943 Outdoor Championships | 110 yd Freestyle |
| Gold medal – first place | 1943 Outdoor Championships | 220 yd Freestyle |
| Silver medal – second place | 1943 Indoor Championships | 220 yd Freestyle |
| Silver medal – second place | 1945 Indoor Championships | 100 yd Freestyle |
NCAA
| Gold medal – first place | 1944 Championships | 50 yd Freestyle |
| Gold medal – first place | 1944 Championships | 150 yd Backstroke |
| Gold medal – first place | 1944 Championships | 100 yd Freestyle |

Alan Robert Ford (December 7, 1923 – November 3, 2008) was an American competition swimmer, Olympic medalist, and former world record-holder in two events. Ford won a silver medal at the 1948 Summer Olympics in London, and was the first person to swim the 100-yard freestyle in under 50 seconds.

== Biography ==
Born in the Panama Canal Zone, he moved to Sarasota, Florida from Midland, Michigan. Ford attended U.S schools in the Panama Canal Zone, Mercersburg Academy, and graduated from Yale University with a Bachelor of Science degree in mechanical engineering in 1945. He served as an ensign in the U.S. Navy during the final months of World War II.

During his prep and university swimming careers, Ford held numerous national and world records. While at Yale, he trained under swimming coach Robert J. H. Kiphuth, an innovator who introduced dry-land exercises and interval training. Ford broke Johnny Weissmuller's 17-year-old world record in the 100-yard freestyle. In 1944, Ford became the first person to swim 100 yards freestyle in less than 50 seconds, swimming's equivalent of running a sub-four-minute mile in track. Ford became known as the "human fish," an unofficial title he took over from Weissmuller. This performance was unequaled for eight years. During his senior year at Yale University, he was the captain of Yale Bulldogs swimming and diving team.

In 1944, when Ford was in the prime of his swimming career, the 1944 Summer Olympics were cancelled because of World War II. That year he won national college titles in the 50-yard and 100-yard freestyle and the 150-yard backstroke. He came out of retirement after the war and returned to New Haven to train with Kiphuth. He had lost as much as 25 pounds of muscle and hadn't been in a pool for three years. After only six months of training, and quitting smoking during that time, he made the U.S. Olympic Team and won a silver medal at the 1948 Summer Olympics in London in the 100 meter freestyle losing to his teammate Wally Ris.

At the US Olympic trials of the 1948 4x200-meter freestyle relay, several swimmers who had already qualified in other events slowed down in their heats or swam fast in the prelims and scratched themselves for the final to allow more swimmers to qualify for the US Olympic Team.

Ultimately, coach Robert Kiphuth did hold a time trial shortly after the actual trials with eleven of the swimmers. This time trial had Jimmy McLane as first overall with a time of 2:11.0, Bill Smith and Wally Wolf in 2:11.2, and Wally Ris in 2:12.4. This quartet was used for the Olympic final. The next four-Eugene Rogers in 2:14.2, Edwin Gilbert in 2:15.4, Robert Gibe in 2:15.6, and William Dudley in 2:15.9, were used in the Olympic prelims. The next three swimmers-Joe Verdeur who came in 2:16.3, Alan Ford in 2;16.4 and George Hoogerhyde in 2:17.4 were not used in the 4x200 freestyle relay.

After his graduation from Yale, Ford went on to become a mechanical engineer. Ford designed and managed the construction of oil refineries, chemical, ore, and food-processing plants as well as petroleum and chemical storage facilities in the United States and abroad.

Ford was inducted into the International Swimming Hall of Fame as an "Honor Swimmer" in 1966. At the ceremonies, when Ford was introduced, someone in the audience booed loudly. The crowd broke into laughter when they realized it was Johnny Weissmuller.

His swimming talents can still be seen in the 1940s film, Blue Winners.

Ford died of emphysema on November 3, 2008, in Sarasota, Florida; he was 84 years old.

== See also ==
- List of Olympic medalists in swimming (men)
- List of Yale University people
- World record progression 100 metres freestyle
- World record progression 4 × 100 metres freestyle relay
