= Aladár Gerevich =

Hungarian fencer (1910–1991)

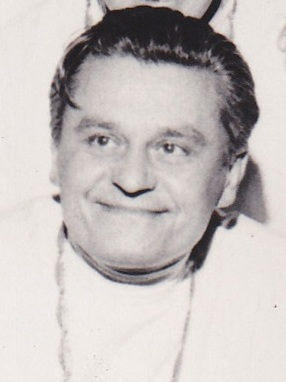
- Gerevich in 1960

Personal information
- Born: 16 March 1910 Jászberény, Kingdom of Hungary, Austria-Hungary
- Died: 14 May 1991 (aged 81) Budapest, Hungary
- Height: 1.77 m (5 ft 10 in)
- Weight: 78 kg (172 lb)

Sport
- Sport: Fencing
- Club: Magyar Atlétikai Club; Csepeli MTK; Budapesti Vörös Meteor SK
Medal record
Representing Hungary
Olympic Games
Gold medal – first place	1932 Los Angeles	Sabre team
Gold medal – first place	1936 Berlin	Sabre team
Gold medal – first place	1948 London	Sabre team
Gold medal – first place	1948 London	Sabre individual
Gold medal – first place	1952 Helsinki	Sabre team
Gold medal – first place	1956 Melbourne	Sabre team
Gold medal – first place	1960 Rome	Sabre team
Silver medal – second place	1952 Helsinki	Sabre individual
Bronze medal – third place	1936 Berlin	Sabre individual
Bronze medal – third place	1952 Helsinki	Foil team

Aladár Gerevich (16 March 1910 – 14 May 1991) was a Hungarian fencer, regarded as "the greatest Olympic swordsman ever". He won seven gold medals in sabre at six different Olympic Games.

== Biography ==
Gerevich was the first athlete to win the same Olympic event six times (despite two Games cancelled because of the Second World War) with a record 28-year gap between first and last medals. (Both records were broken by Isabell Werth, who won seven team dressage golds between 1992 and 2024.)

Gerevich's wife, Erna Bogen (also known as Erna Bogathy), his son, Pál Gerevich, and his father-in-law, Albert Bogen (a silver medalist in team sabre for Austria at the 1912 Summer Olympics), all won Olympic medals in fencing.

In the Hungarian Olympic trials for the 1960 Rome Olympics, the fencing committee told Gerevich that he was too old to compete. He silenced them by challenging the entire sabre team to individual matches and winning every match. He missed the finals of the 1960 Olympic individual sabre event, and a possible individual gold medal, by a single touch. After retiring, he coached fencing at the Vasas Sports Club in Budapest, where he died aged 81. Asteroid 228893 Gerevich, discovered by Krisztián Sárneczky and Brigitta Sipőcz at Piszkéstető Station in 2003, was named in his memory. The official naming citation was published by the Minor Planet Center on 16 January 2014 (M.P.C. 86716).

== See also ==
- List of athletes with the most appearances at Olympic Games
- List of multiple Olympic gold medalists
- List of multiple Olympic gold medalists in one event
- List of multiple Summer Olympic medalists
