= Mauro Racca =

Italian fencer (1912–1977)

Personal information
- Born: 3 April 1912 Turin, Italy
- Died: 27 April 1977 (aged 65) Padua, Italy

Sport
- Sport: Fencing
Medal record
Men's fencing
Representing Italy
Olympic Games
Silver medal – second place	1948 London	Sabre, team
Silver medal – second place	1952 Helsinki	Sabre, team
Mediterranean Games
Gold medal – first place	1951 Alexandria	Team sabre
Silver medal – second place	1951 Alexandria	Individual sabre

Mauro Racca (3 April 1912 – 27 April 1977) was an Italian fencer. He won two silver medals in the team sabre events at the 1948 and 1952 Summer Olympics. He also competed at the 1951 Mediterranean Games where he won a gold medal in the team sabre event and a silver medal in the individual sabre event.
