= Walter Schneider (swimmer) =

Swiss swimmer (1928–2007/2008)

Personal information
- Born: 13 June 1928
- Died: 2007 or 2008

Sport
- Sport: Swimming

Walter Schneider (13 June 1928 – 2007 or 2008) was a Swiss freestyle swimmer. He competed at the 1948 Summer Olympics and the 1952 Summer Olympics.
