= Gordon Ward (philatelist) =

British philatelist

Gordon Reginald Ward (23 February 1885 – 10 July 1962) was a British philatelist who signed the Roll of Distinguished Philatelists in 1953.

== Publications ==
- War Time Posts of Malta. 1950.
- The Springbok Half-Penny of South Africa. 1956.
- South Africa - The Ship Penny.
- KG V 1½d, Die 2, of Australia. 1950.
- KG V 5d of Australia. 1953.
- Franco Heads Issue of Spain. 1952.
