= Vincenzo Pinton =

Italian fencer (1914–1980)

Personal information
- Born: 14 March 1914 Vicenza, Italy
- Died: 8 April 1980 (aged 66) Venice, Italy

Sport
- Sport: Fencing
Medal record
Men's fencing
Representing Italy
Olympic Games
Silver medal – second place	1936 Berlin	Sabre, team
Silver medal – second place	1948 London	Sabre, individual
Silver medal – second place	1948 London	Sabre, team
Silver medal – second place	1952 Helsinki	Sabre, team

Vincenzo Pinton (14 March 1914 – 8 April 1980) was an Italian fencer. He won four silver medals at three Olympic Games.
