= Plauto Guimarães =

Brazilian swimmer (1925–1972)

Personal information
- Full name: Plauto de Barros Guimarães
- Nationality: Brazil
- Born: 25 April 1925 São Paulo, Brazil
- Died: October 10, 1972 (aged 47)

Sport
- Sport: Swimming
- Strokes: Freestyle
Medal record
Men's swimming
Representing Brazil

Plauto de Barros Guimarães (25 April 1925 – 10 October 1972) was an Olympic freestyle swimmer from Brazil, who participated in a Summer Olympics for his native country. He was born in São Paulo.

He was a member of Esporte Clube Pinheiros, São Paulo.

At the 1948 Summer Olympics in London, he swam the 100-metre freestyle, not reaching the finals. He was also ranked to compete in the 4×200-metre freestyle, but at the Brazilian trials, Willy Otto Jordan persuaded the Brazilian principals to make a new classification proof, where Willy took the vacancy of Plauto.

In 1955, he had already retired from swimming.
