= Gordon Ward (diver) =

British diver (1920–1986)

Personal information
- Full name: Gordon Frank Ward
- Nationality: British
- Born: 31 July 1920 Hendon, Middlesex, England
- Died: 29 March 1986 (aged 65) Hillingdon, London, England

Sport
- Sport: Diving

Gordon Frank Ward (31 July 1920 – 29 March 1986) was a British diver. He competed in the men's 10 metre platform event at the 1948 Summer Olympics. Ward died in Hillingdon, London on 29 March 1986, at the age of 65.
