= Panagiotis Hatzikyriakakis =

Greek swimmer (died 1964)

Personal information
- Full name: Panagiotis Hatzikyriakakis
- Nationality: Greek
- Died: 1964

Sport
- Sport: Swimming

Panagiotis Hatzikyriakakis (died 1964) was a Greek swimmer. He competed in the men's 100 metre freestyle at the 1948 Summer Olympics. He played at club level for Ethnikos Piraeus. Hatzikyriakakis died in 1964.
