= Stefanos Zintzos =

Greek fencer (1917–1992)

Personal information
- Born: 1917 Alexandria, Egypt
- Died: 1992

Sport
- Sport: Fencing

Stefanos Zintzos (Greek: Στέφανος Ζιντζος; 1917–1992) was a Greek fencer. He competed in the individual and team foil and team épée events at the 1948 Summer Olympics.
