= Trevor Harrop =

Canadian-born British swimmer (1927–2022)

Personal information
- Born: April 19, 1927 Winnipeg, Canada
- Died: April 9, 2022 (aged 94)

Sport
- Sport: Swimming

Trevor James Harrop (19 April 1927 – 9 April 2022) was a British swimmer. He was born in Winnipeg, Manitoba, Canada. He later went on to practice dentistry in Vancouver, B.C., Canada. He competed for Great Britain at the 1948 Summer Olympics.
