= Mohamed Abdel Khalek Allam =

Egyptian diver (1921–2011)

Personal information
- Nationality: Egyptian
- Born: 22 December 1921 Cairo, Egypt
- Died: January 2011 (aged 89) Cairo, Egypt

Sport
- Sport: Diving

Mohamed Abdel Khalek Allam (22 December 1921 – January 2011) was an Egyptian diver. He competed in the men's 10 metre platform event at the 1948 Summer Olympics. Outside of sports, he was an educator. Allam died in Cairo in January 2011, at the age of 89.
