= Konstantinos Mylonas =

Greek sports shooter (1916–2010)

Personal information
- Born: 1916 Athens, Kingdom of Greece
- Died: 2010 (aged 93–94) Athens, Greece

Sport
- Sport: Sports shooting

Konstantinos Mylonas (1916–2010) was a Greek sports shooter. He competed at the 1948 Summer Olympics and 1952 Summer Olympics.
