= Jorge Sarria =

Peruvian fencer (1915–??)

Personal information
- Born: 13 May 1915

Sport
- Sport: Fencing

Jorge Sarria (born 13 May 1915, date of death unknown) was a Peruvian fencer. He competed in the individual sabre event at the 1948 Summer Olympics.
