= Georgios Vikhos =

Greek sports shooter

Personal information
- Born: 11 January 1915 Athens, Greece
- Died: 19 April 1990 (aged 75)

Sport
- Sport: Sports shooting

Georgios Vikhos (11 January 1915 – 19 April 1990) was a Greek sports shooter. He competed at the 1936 Summer Olympics and 1948 Summer Olympics.
