= George Worth =

Hungarian-American fencer (1915–2006)

Personal information
- Full name: George Vitéz Worth
- Nationality: Hungarian; American
- Born: György Woittitz; April 1, 1915 Budapest, Kingdom of Hungary
- Died: January 15, 2006 (aged 90) Orangeburg, New York, U.S.
- Height: 5 ft 8 in (173 cm)
- Weight: 154 lb (70 kg)
- Spouse: Karen

Sport
- Country: United States
- Sport: Fencing
- Event: Sabre
- Club: Salle Santelli
- Coached by: Italo Santelli
Medal record
Men's fencing
Representing United States
Olympic Games
Bronze medal – third place	1948 London	Team sabre
Pan American Games
Gold medal – first place	1951 Buenos Aires	Team sabre
Gold medal – first place	1955 Mexico City	Team sabre
Gold medal – first place	1959 Chicago	Team sabre
Silver medal – second place	1951 Buenos Aires	Individual sabre
Silver medal – second place	1955 Mexico City	Team foil

George Vitéz Worth (born György Woittitz; April 1, 1915 – January 15, 2006) was a Hungarian-born American sabre Olympic medalist fencer.

== Early and personal life ==
Worth was born György Woittitz in Budapest, Hungary, and was Jewish. Because of the political climate in Hungary and rising anti-Semitism in 1937, he sought to emigrate to the United States, but he was unable to do so directly because he was Jewish and spent two years in Cuba.

Woittitz was finally able to come to the US through Miami in 1940. He changed his name to George Worth, and at 22 lived in Manhattan in New York City, becoming a US citizen in February 1944. After gaining citizenship, he won several Bronze Stars fighting for the American Army's 62nd Division in World War II during the Battle of the Bulge, from 1944-5.

He later served as Captain of the South Orangetown, New York Ambulance Corps and Chief Commissioner of the Orangeburg, New York Fire Department.

== Fencing career ==
Worth began fencing while he was a youth in Hungary, at Salle Santelli, the fencing school of Italo Santelli. Italo Santelli was recognized as the pre-eminent sabre coach of his era and the father of Giorgio Santelli, who became a five-time US Olympic coach. During Worth's two years in Cuba, he won the Cuban national sabre championship and fenced often with Ramon Fonst, who had won the Olympic championship in both 1900 and 1904.

=== US Championship ===
Worth won the US AFLA national sabre championship in 1954, and was a 5-time medalist. He was a member of 14 national championship teams, representing Salle Santelli his entire career.

=== Olympics ===
Worth competed at four Olympic Games for the US Olympic team—in 1948, 1952, 1956, and 1960.

==== Bronze medal ====
He won a bronze medal at the 1948 Summer Olympics in London at 33 years of age in the team saber competition, and he reached the finals and placed fifth in the individual saber event.

At the 1952 Summer Olympics in Helsinki at 37 years of age, he reached the quarterfinals in the solo event and advanced to the final in the team saber event, where they finished in fourth place.

At the 1956 Summer Olympics in Melbourne at 41 years of age, he reached the semifinals in the sabre event. In the team event, they had a bye into the semifinals, where they were defeated.

His final Olympics was the 1960 Summer Olympics in Rome at 45 years of age, where he and his team placed fourth in the sabre competition.

=== Pan American Games ===
Worth was also a member of three Pan-American teams on behalf of the US. He won the individual silver medal in sabre and the team gold medal in sabre and foil at the 1951 Pan American Games in Argentina. He repeated those results at the 1955 Pan American Games in Mexico. At the 1959 Pan American Games in Chicago, he again won a team gold, and came in fifth in the individual competition.

He took the Pan American Games Oath of Participation on behalf of all athletes of the United States during the opening ceremonies of the 1959 Games.

After his fencing career concluded, he was a leading official in the sport. After retiring from the South Orangetown Ambulance Corps, he delivered Meals-on-Wheels as a volunteer. He died on January 15, 2006, at the advanced age of 90. He was married to his wife Karen for 52 years, and was survived by her and his children James and Karen. He was buried at Loescher's Veterans Cemetery in New Hempstead, New York.

== Hall of Fame ==
He was inducted into the USFA Hall of Fame in 1974.

== See also ==
- List of select Jewish fencers
- List of Jewish Olympic medalists
- List of USFA Hall of Fame members
