= Jan Nawrocki =

Polish fencer (1913–2000)

Personal information
- Born: 6 September 1913 Strzyżów, Austria-Hungary
- Died: 19 June 2000 (aged 86)

Sport
- Sport: Fencing

Jan Nawrocki (6 September 1913 – 19 June 2000) was a Polish fencer. He competed at the 1948 and 1952 Summer Olympics.

== Family ==
His sister, Irena Nawrocka, was also an Olympic fencer. She and their first cousin, Halina Dobrowolska (during the war, Halina Korabiowska), served as messengers for Home Army during World War II. The two cousins and three other female Home Army messengers narrowly escaped during a forced march to Ozarow.
