= Evangelos Kouvelis =

Greek cyclist (born 1917)

Personal information
- Full name: Evangelos Kouvelis
- Born: 1917

Cycling career
- Sport: Cycling

Evangelos Kouvelis (born 1917, date of death unknown) was a Greek cyclist. He competed in the individual and team road race events at the 1948 Summer Olympics. Kouvelis is deceased.
