= Juan Antonio Martínez (fencer) =

Cuban fencer (born 1920)

Personal information
- Full name: Juan Antonio Martínez Valdés Cantero
- Born: 21 December 1920

Sport
- Sport: Fencing

Juan Antonio Martínez (born 21 December 1920) is a Cuban fencer. He competed in the individual sabre and team épée events at the 1948 Summer Olympics.
