= Kamal Ali Hassan =

Egyptian diver

Personal information
- Nationality: Egyptian
- Born: 14 July 1924 Alexandria, Egypt
- Died: 3 June 1984 (aged 59) Corinth, Mississippi

Sport
- Sport: Diving

Kamal Ali Hassan (July 14, 1924 – 3 June 1984) was an Egyptian former diver. He competed at the 1952 Summer Olympics.
