= Ignacio Goldstein =

Chilean fencer

Personal information
- Born: 21 January 1924
- Died: 30 July 2001 (aged 77)

Sport
- Sport: Fencing

Ignacio Goldstein (21 January 1924 – 30 July 2001) was a Chilean fencer. He competed in the individual sabre and épée events at the 1948 Summer Olympics.
