= Alois Sokol =

Czech fencer (1914–1991)

Personal information
- Born: 27 June 1914 Munich, Germany
- Died: 6 September 1991 (aged 77)

Sport
- Country: Czechoslovakia
- Sport: Fencing

Alois Sokol (27 June 1914 – 6 September 1991) was a Czech fencer. He competed for Czechoslovakia in the individual and team sabre events at the 1948 Summer Olympics. Sokol died on 6 September 1991, at the age of 77.
