= Eddy Kuijpers =

Dutch fencer (1914–1992)

Personal information
- Born: 14 October 1914 The Hague, Netherlands
- Died: 12 October 1992 (aged 77) The Hague, Netherlands

Sport
- Sport: Fencing

Eddy Kuijpers (14 October 1914 – 12 October 1992) was a Dutch fencer. He competed in the individual and team foil and sabre events at the 1948 Summer Olympics.
