= Taha Youssef El-Gamal =

Egyptian swimmer (1923–1956)

Personal information
- Born: 26 March 1923
- Died: October–November 1956 (age 33)

Sport
- Sport: Swimming
Medal record
Representing Egypt
Mediterranean Games
Swimming
Bronze medal – third place	1951 Alexandria	4x200m freestyle relay
Water polo
Silver medal – second place	1951 Alexandria	Men's tournament

Taha Youssef El-Gamal (26 March 1923 – October–November 1956) was an Egyptian swimmer. He competed in two events at the 1948 Summer Olympics and the water polo tournaments at the 1948 and 1952 Summer Olympics.
