= Carlo Turcato =

Italian fencer (1921–2017)

Personal information
- Born: 22 September 1921 Cervignano del Friuli
- Died: 2 June 2017 (aged 95) Padova, Italy

Sport
- Sport: Fencing
Medal record
Men's fencing
Representing Italy
Olympic Games
Silver medal – second place	1948 London	Sabre, team

Carlo Turcato (22 September 1921 – 2 June 2017) was an Italian fencer. He won a silver medal in the team sabre event at the 1948 Summer Olympics.
