= Gastone Darè =

Italian fencer and politician

Personal information
- Born: 18 February 1918 Suzzara, Italy
- Died: 7 June 1976 (aged 58) Mantua, Italy

Sport
- Sport: Fencing
Medal record
Men's fencing
Representing Italy
Olympic Games
Silver medal – second place	1948 London	Sabre, team
Silver medal – second place	1952 Helsinki	Sabre, team
Mediterranean Games
Gold medal – first place	10955 Barcelona	Team sabre
Bronze medal – third place	1955 Barcelona	Individual sabre

Gastone Darè

Italian Senator from Lombardy
- In office 16 May 1963 – 24 May 1972
- Preceded by: Title jointly held
- Succeeded by: Title jointly held
- Constituency: Ostiglia

Personal details
- Born: Gastone Darè; 18 February 1918 Suzzara, Italy
- Died: 7 June 1976 (aged 58) Mantua, Italy
- Party: Italian Socialist Party
- Profession: Journalist

Gastone Darè (18 February 1918 – 7 June 1976) was an Italian fencer and politician. He won two silver medals in the team sabre events at the 1948 and 1952 Summer Olympics. He also competed at the 1955 Mediterranean Games where he won a gold medal in the team sabre event and a bronze medal in the individual sabre event. He was elected to the Italian Senate for the Socialist Party in 1963 and 1968.

Italian Senate
Preceded by Title jointly held	Italian Senator for Lombardy; 1963–1972	Succeeded by Title jointly held
