= Dean Cetrulo =

American fencer (1919–2010)

Personal information
- Born: February 24, 1919 Newark, New Jersey, United States
- Died: May 9, 2010 (aged 91) Bay Head, New Jersey, United States

Sport
- Sport: Fencing
Medal record
Men's fencing
Representing United States
Olympic Games
Bronze medal – third place	1948 London	Sabre, team

Dean Cetrulo (February 24, 1919 – May 9, 2010) was an American fencer. He won a bronze medal in the team sabre event at the 1948 Summer Olympics.

== See also ==
- List of USFA Division I National Champions
