= Walter Widemann =

Swiss fencer (1893–1969)

Personal information
- Born: Walter Emil Widemann; 20 November 1893 Zurich, Switzerland
- Died: 10 March 1969 (aged 75) Zollikon, Switzerland

Sport
- Sport: Fencing

Walter Emil Widemann (20 November 1893 – 10 March 1969) was a Swiss sabre fencer. He competed at the 1936 and 1948 Summer Olympics. Widemann died on 10 March 1969, at the age of 76.
