= Heinz Putzl =

Austrian fencer

Personal information
- Born: 17 April 1928

Sport
- Sport: Fencing

Heinz Putzl (born 17 April 1928) is an Austrian former fencer. He competed at the 1948 and 1952 Summer Olympics.
