= Nikolaos Christogiannopoulos =

Greek fencer (1916–1991)

Personal information
- Born: 1916
- Died: 1991 (aged 74–75)

Sport
- Sport: Fencing

Nikolaos Christogiannopoulos (Greek: Νικόλαος Χριστογιαννόπουλος, 1916–1991) was a Greek fencer. He competed in the individual and team sabre events at the 1948 Summer Olympics.
