= Antoni Sobik =

Polish fencer

Personal information
- Born: 17 January 1905 Gortatowice, Russian Empire
- Died: 23 June 1994 (aged 89) Katowice, Poland

Sport
- Sport: Fencing

Antoni Sobik (17 January 1905 – 23 June 1994) was a Polish fencer. He competed at the 1936 and 1948 Summer Olympics.
