= Petros Leonidis =

Greek cyclist

Personal information
- Full name: Petros Leonidis

Cycling career
- Sport: Cycling

Petros Leonidis was a Greek cyclist. He competed in the individual and team road race events at the 1948 Summer Olympics.
