= Mahmoud Younes =

Egyptian fencer (1915–2001)

Personal information
- Born: 5 March 1915
- Died: 27 June 2001 (aged 86)

Sport
- Sport: Fencing
Medal record
Mediterranean Games
Silver medal – second place	1951 Alexandria	Team sabre
Bronze medal – third place	1951 Alexandria	Team épée
Bronze medal – third place	1951 Alexandria	Team foil
Bronze medal – third place	1955 Barcelona	Team sabre
Bronze medal – third place	1955 Barcelona	Team épée
Bronze medal – third place	1955 Barcelona	Team foil

Mahmoud Khattab Younes (5 March 1915 – 27 June 2001) was an Egyptian épée, foil and sabre fencer. He competed at the 1948 and 1952 Summer Olympics. He competed at the Mediterranean Games in 1951 where he won a silver medal in the team sabre event and bronze medals in the épée and foil events, and in 1955, where he won bronze medals in the sabre, épée and foil team events.
