= Alphonse Ruckstuhl =

Swiss fencer (1901–1966)

Personal information
- Born: 30 September 1901
- Died: January 1966 (aged 64) Zurich, Switzerland

Sport
- Sport: Fencing

Alphonse Ruckstuhl (30 September 1901 – January 1966) was a Swiss fencer. He competed in the individual and team sabre events at the 1936 and 1948 Summer Olympics.
