= Willem van den Berg =

Dutch fencer (1910–1987)

Personal information
- Born: 1 August 1910 Rotterdam, Netherlands
- Died: 8 November 1987 (aged 77) Hoorn, Netherlands

Sport
- Sport: Fencing

Willem van den Berg (1 August 1910 – 8 November 1987) was a Dutch fencer. He competed in the individual and team sabre and team foil events at the 1948 Summer Olympics.
