= Teodor Zaczyk =

Polish fencer

Personal information
- Born: 20 April 1900 Kobyla, Russian Empire
- Died: 23 April 1990 (aged 90) Sosnowiec, Poland

Sport
- Sport: Fencing

Teodor Zaczyk (20 April 1900 – 23 April 1990) was a Polish fencer. He competed at the 1936 and 1948 Summer Olympics.
