= Frans Mosman =

Dutch fencer (1904–1994)

Personal information
- Full name: Franciscus Albertus Mosman
- Born: 5 December 1904 Amsterdam, Netherlands
- Died: 1 June 1994 (aged 89) Amsterdam, Netherlands

Sport
- Sport: Fencing

Frans Mosman (5 December 1904 – 1 June 1994) was a Dutch foil and sabre fencer. He competed at the 1928, 1936 and 1948 Summer Olympics.
