= Fernando Huergo =

Argentine fencer (1908–1995)

Personal information
- Full name: Fernando Ignacio Huergo Tonnelier
- Born: 31 July 1908 Buenos Aires, Argentina
- Died: 3 April 1995 (aged 86)

Sport
- Sport: Fencing
Medal record
Men's fencing
Representing Argentina
Pan American Games
Silver medal – second place	1951 Buenos Aires	Team sabre

Fernando Ignacio Huergo Tonnelier (31 July 1908 – 3 April 1995) was an Argentine fencer.

== Career ==
He competed in the individual and team sabre events at the 1948 Summer Olympics. Huergo won a silver medal at the 1951 Pan American Games and a bronze medal at the 1955 Pan American Games. He was also the President of the Argentine Olympic Committee from 1955 to 1957.
