= Jorge Cermesoni =

Argentine fencer (1908–2002)

Personal information
- Born: 16 August 1908 Buenos Aires, Argentina
- Died: 27 December 2002 (aged 94)

Sport
- Sport: Fencing

Jorge Cermesoni (16 August 1908 – 27 December 2002) was an Argentine fencer. He competed in the individual and team sabre events at the 1948.
