= Hassan Hosni Tawfik =

Egyptian fencer

Personal information
- Born: 7 November 1911
- Died: 25 November 2005 (aged 94)

Sport
- Sport: Fencing
Medal record
Mediterranean Games
Bronze medal – third place	1951 Alexandria	Team foil

Hassan Hosni Tawfik (7 November 1911 – 25 November 2005) was an Egyptian épée and foil fencer. He competed at the 1936, 1948 and 1952 Summer Olympics. He also competed at the 1951 Mediterranean Games where he won a bronze medal in the team foil event.
