= Antonio Haro =

Mexican fencer (1910–2002)

Personal information
- Born: 26 October 1910 Mexico City, Mexico
- Died: 22 September 2002 (aged 91) Mexico City, Mexico

Sport
- Sport: Fencing

Antonio Haro (26 October 1910 – 22 September 2002) was a Mexican épée and sabre fencer. He competed at four Olympic Games.
