= Maurice Gramain =

French fencer

Personal information
- Born: 6 August 1911
- Died: 26 March 1996 (aged 84)

Sport
- Sport: Fencing

Maurice Gramain (6 August 1911 – 26 March 1996) was a French sabre fencer. He competed at the 1936 and 1948 Summer Olympics.
