= Bolesław Banaś =

Polish fencer

Personal information
- Born: 17 March 1912 Łódź, Russian Empire
- Died: 24 September 1991 (aged 79) Łódź, Poland

Sport
- Sport: Fencing

Bolesław Banaś (17 March 1912 – 24 September 1991) was a Polish fencer. He competed in the team épée and individual and team sabre events at the 1948 Summer Olympics.
