= Ioannis Karamazakis =

Greek fencer

Personal information
- Died: 1978

Sport
- Sport: Fencing

Ioannis Karamazakis (Greek: Ιωάννης Καραμαζάκης; died 1978) was a Greek fencer. He competed in six events at the 1948 Summer Olympics.
