= Hubert Loisel =

Austrian fencer

Personal information
- Born: 23 April 1912
- Died: 24 February 1999 (aged 86)

Sport
- Sport: Fencing

Hubert Loisel (23 April 1912 – 24 February 1999) was an Austrian fencer. He competed at the 1936, 1948 and 1952 Summer Olympics. His son, Georg Loisel, also fenced for Austria at the Olympics.
