= Ahmed Abou-Shadi =

Egyptian fencer

Personal information
- Born: أحمد فريد أبو شادي; 28 November 1909 Shibin Al Kawm, Al Minufiyah, Egypt

Sport
- Sport: Fencing
Medal record
Mediterranean Games
Silver medal – second place	1951 Alexandria	Team sabre

Ahmed Farid Abou-Shadi (Arabic: أحمد فريد أبو شادي; 28 November 1909 – unknown) was an Egyptian sabre fencer who competed in the individual and team sabre events at the 1948 and 1952 Summer Olympics. He was born in Shibin Al Kawm, Al Minufiyah, Egypt. He competed at the age of 42 years, 246 days in 1952, and holds the record as the oldest Egyptian Olympic fencer. He also competed at the 1951 Mediterranean Games where he won a silver medal in the team sabre event.
