= Athanasios Nanopoulos =

Greek fencer

Personal information
- Born: 1911
- Died: March 1992 (aged 80–81)

Sport
- Sport: Fencing

Athanasios Nanopoulos (Greek: Αθανάσιος Νανόπουλος) (1911 – March 1992) was a Greek fencer. He competed in five events at the 1948 Summer Olympics.
