= Mohamed Zulficar =

Egyptian fencer (born 1918)

Personal information
- Full name: Mohamed Zulficar Al-Kashif
- Born: 4 September 1918

Sport
- Sport: Fencing
Medal record
Mediterranean Games
Silver medal – second place	1951 Alexandria	Team sabre

Mohamed Zulficar (born 4 September 1918, date of death unknown) was an Egyptian Olympic sabre fencer. He competed at the 1948 and 1952 Summer Olympics. He also competed in the 1951 Mediterranean Games where he won a silver medal in the team sabre event. Zulficar is deceased.
