= Swimming at the 1948 Summer Olympics – Men's 400 metre freestyle =

Men's 400 metre freestyle at the Games of the XIV Olympiad
- Venue: Wembley Arena
- Date: 31 July 1948 (heats); 2 August 1948 (semifinals); 4 August 1948 (final)
- Competitors: 41 from 21 nations
- Winning time: 4:41.0 OR

Medalists
| 1st place, gold medalist(s) | | William Smith | United States |
| 2nd place, silver medalist(s) | | Jimmy McLane | United States |
| 3rd place, bronze medalist(s) | | John Marshall | Australia |

The men's 400 metre freestyle event at the 1948 Olympic Games took place between 31 July and 4 August at the Empire Pool. This swimming event used freestyle swimming, which means that the method of the stroke is not regulated (unlike backstroke, breaststroke, and butterfly events). Nearly all swimmers use the front crawl or a variant of that stroke. Because an Olympic-size swimming pool is 50 metres long, this race consisted of eight lengths of the pool.

== Results ==
=== Heats ===
| Rank | Athlete | Country | Time | Notes |
|---|---|---|---|---|
| 1 | Jimmy McLane | United States | 4:42.2 | Q, OR |
| 2 | Bill Smith | United States | 4:45.3 | Q |
| 3 | John Marshall | Australia | 4:51.4 | Q |
| 4 | Géza Kádas | Hungary | 4:52.8 | Q |
| 5 | Jack Hale | Great Britain | 4:53.3 | Q |
| 5 | Alex Jany | France | 4:53.3 | Q |
| 7 | Per-Olof Östrand | Sweden | 4:53.5 | Q |
| 8 | Alfredo Yantorno | Argentina | 4:53.8 | Q |
| 9 | György Mitró | Hungary | 4:56.0 | Q |
| 10 | Bill Heusner | United States | 4:58.3 | Q |
| 11 | Don Johnston | South Africa | 4:57.4 | Q |
| 12 | Miroslav Bartůšek | Czechoslovakia | 4:57.9 | q |
| 13 | Branko Vidović | Yugoslavia | 4:58.7 | q |
| 14 | Janko Puhar | Yugoslavia | 5:00.8 | q |
| 15 | Marijan Stipetić | Yugoslavia | 5:01.4 | q |
| 16 | Imre Nyéki | Hungary | 5:01.8 | Q |
| 17 | Luis González | Colombia | 5:02.1 | |
| 18 | Roy Botham | Great Britain | 5:03.4 | |
| 19 | Jo Bernardo | France | 5:03.8 | |
| 20 | Florbel Pérez | Uruguay | 5:04.7 | |
| 21 | René Cornu | France | 5:05.2 | |
| 22 | José Durañona | Argentina | 5:05.8 | |
| 23 | Garrick Agnew | Australia | 5:06.1 | |
| 24 | Luis Child | Colombia | 5:08.5 | |
| 25 | Isidoro Martínez-Vela | Spain | 5:10.0 | |
| 26 | Juan Garay | Argentina | 5:10.4 | |
| 27 | Doug Gibson | Canada | 5:13.4 | |
| 28 | Isidoro Pérez | Spain | 5:16.1 | |
| 29 | Ari Guðmundsson | Iceland | 5:16.2 | |
| 30 | Alejandro Febrero | Spain | 5:16.9 | |
| 31 | Tom Holt | Great Britain | 5:20.7 | |
| 32 | Derek Oatway | Bermuda | 5:20.9 | |
| 33 | Allen Gilchrist | Canada | 5:21.5 | |
| 34 | Sambiao Basanung | Philippines | 5:21.5 | |
| 35 | Walter Schneider | Switzerland | 5:25.5 | |
| 36 | Walter Bardgett | Bermuda | 5:37.2 | |
| 37 | Robert Cook | Bermuda | 5:37.9 | |
| 38 | Bimal Chandra | India | 5:38.6 | |
| 39 | Jack Hakim | Egypt | 5:40.3 | |
| 40 | Anwar Aziz Chaudhry | Pakistan | 6:17.4 | |
| 41 | Sultan Karim Ali | Pakistan | 7:16.9 | |

Key: OR = Olympic record, Q = qualification by place in heat, q = qualification by overall place

=== Semifinals ===
| Rank | Athlete | Country | Time | Notes |
|---|---|---|---|---|
| 1 | Géza Kádas | Hungary | 4:47.8 | Q |
| 2 | William Smith | United States | 4:48.4 | Q |
| 3 | Jimmy McLane | United States | 4:49.5 | Q |
| 4 | John Marshall | Australia | 4:50.0 | Q |
| 5 | György Mitró | Hungary | 4:50.8 | q |
| 6 | Alex Jany | France | 4:51.3 | q |
| 7 | Jack Hale | Great Britain | 4:51.4 | q |
| 8 | Alfredo Yantorno | Argentina | 4:57.3 | q |
| 9 | Bill Heusner | United States | 4:57.4 | |
| 10 | Marjan Stipetić | Yugoslavia | 4:58.6 | |
| 11 | Janko Puhar | Yugoslavia | 4:58.7 | |
| 11 | Miroslav Bartůšek | Czechoslovakia | 4:58.7 | |
| 13 | Branko Vidović | Yugoslavia | 4:59.4 | |
| 14 | Don Johnston | South Africa | 4:59.5 | |

Key: Q = qualification by place in heat, q = qualification by overall place

=== Final ===
| Rank | Athlete | Country | Time | Notes |
|---|---|---|---|---|
| 1 | Bill Smith | United States | 4:41.0 | OR |
| 2 | Jimmy McLane | United States | 4:43.4 | |
| 3 | John Marshall | Australia | 4:47.4 | |
| 4 | Géza Kádas | Hungary | 4:49.4 | |
| 5 | György Mitró | Hungary | 4:49.9 | |
| 6 | Alex Jany | France | 4:51.4 | |
| 7 | Jack Hale | Great Britain | 4:55.9 | |
| 8 | Alfredo Yantorno | Argentina | 4:58.7 | |

Key: OR = Olympic record
