= Swimming at the 1948 Summer Olympics – Men's 1500 metre freestyle =

Men's 1,500 metre freestyle at the Games of the XIV Olympiad
- Venue: Wembley Arena
- Dates: 5 August 1948 (heats); 6 August 1948 (semifinals); 7 August 1948 (final)
- Competitors: 39 from 21 nations
- Winning time: 19:18.5

Medalists
1st place, gold medalist(s)		Jimmy McLane	United States
2nd place, silver medalist(s)		John Marshall	Australia
3rd place, bronze medalist(s)		György Mitró	Hungary

The men's 1500 metre freestyle event at the 1948 Olympic Games took place between 5 and 7 August, at the Empire Pool. This swimming event used freestyle swimming, which means that the method of the stroke is not regulated (unlike backstroke, breaststroke, and butterfly events). Nearly all swimmers use the front crawl or a variant of that stroke. Because an Olympic size swimming pool is 50 metres long, this race consists of 30 lengths of the pool.

== Results ==
=== Heats ===
Rank	Athlete	Country	Time	Notes
1	John Marshall	Australia	20:01.1	
2	György Csordás	Hungary	20:06.8	
3	Marijan Stipetić	Yugoslavia	20:10.1	
4	Donald Bland	Great Britain	20:13.9	
5	György Mitró	Hungary	20:15.0	
6	Jimmy McLane	United States	20:17.7	
7	Miroslav Bartůšek	Czechoslovakia	20:19.4	
8	Per-Olof Östrand	Sweden	20:19.8	
9	Florbel Pérez	Uruguay	20:20.2	
10	Forbes Norris	United States	20:21.0	
11	Bill Heusner	United States	20:29.6	
12	Ferenc Vörös	Hungary	20:31.9	
13	Jack Hale	Great Britain	20:31.9	
14	Jo Bernardo	France	20:34.8	
15	Rolf Kestener	Brazil	20:36.3	
16	Luis González	Colombia	20:40.6	
17	Don Johnston	South Africa	20:41.8	
18	Jack Wardrop	Great Britain	20:43.0	
19	Ramón Bravo	Mexico	20:45.5	
20	Luis Child	Colombia	20:47.0	
21	Angel Maldonado	Mexico	20:47.2	
22	René Cornu	France	21:01.6	
23	Sambiao Basanung	Philippines	21:05.9	
24	Isidoro Martínez-Vela	Spain	21:13.7	
25	César Borja	Mexico	21:15.8	
26	Alejandro Febrero	Spain	21:15.9	
27	Adolfo Mancuso	Argentina	21:16.7	
28	Vanja Illić	Yugoslavia	21:17.0	
29	Joseph Reynders	Belgium	21:23.1	
30	Doug Gibson	Canada	21:25.6	
31	Juan Garay	Argentina	21:33.2	
32	Jesús Domínguez	Spain	21:33.5	
33	Garrick Agnew	Australia	21:40.1	
34	Janko Puhar	Yugoslavia	21:45.1	
35	Derek Oatway	Bermuda	21:55.1	
36	Bimal Chandra	India	22:52.9	
37	Philip Tribley	Bermuda	22:56.6	
38	Allen Gilchrist	Canada	23:00.6	
39	Anwar Aziz Chaudhry	Pakistan	25:37.4	

=== Semifinals ===
Rank	Athlete	Country	Time	Notes
1	Jimmy McLane	United States	19:52.2	Q
2	John Marshall	Australia	19:53.8	Q
3	György Mitró	Hungary	20:06.5	Q
4	György Csordás	Hungary	20:06.6	Q
5	Forbes Norris	United States	20:09.3	Q
6	Marjan Stipetić	Yugoslavia	20:12.9	Q
7	Donald Bland	Great Britain	20:19.8	q
8	Bill Heusner	United States	20:23.9	q
9	Jo Bernardo	France	20:25.5	
10	Ferenc Vörös	Hungary	20:31.4	
11	Florbel Pérez	Uruguay	20:32.6	
12	Miroslav Bartůšek	Czechoslovakia	20:32.9	
13	Luis González	Colombia	20:41.6	
14	Rolf Kestener	Brazil	20:44.6	

Key: Q = qualification by place in heat, q = qualification by overall place

=== Final ===
Rank	Athlete	Country	Time	Notes
1	Jimmy McLane	United States	19:18.5	
2	John Marshall	Australia	19:31.3	
3	György Mitró	Hungary	19:43.2	
4	György Csordás	Hungary	19:54.2	
5	Marjan Stipetić	Yugoslavia	20:10.7	
6	Forbes Norris	United States	20:18.8	
7	Donald Bland	Great Britain	20:19.8	
8	Bill Heusner	United States	20:45.4	
