= Deaths in June 1993 =

The following is a list of notable deaths in June 1993.

Entries for each day are listed alphabetically by surname. A typical entry lists information in the following sequence:

- Name, age, country of citizenship at birth, subsequent country of citizenship (if applicable), reason for notability, cause of death (if known), and reference.

== June 1993 ==
=== 1 ===
- Walker O. Cain, 78, American architect.
- Mauro Mina, 59, Peruvian boxing champion, heart attack.
- Austin Robinson, 95, English economist.
- John Terpak, 80, American weightlifter and Olympian (1936, 1948).

=== 2 ===
- Tahar Djaout, 39, Algerian journalist, poet, and fiction writer, murdered.
- Johnny Mize, 80, American Hall of Fame baseball player (St. Louis Cardinals, New York Giants, New York Yankees), coach and scout.
- Barrington D. Parker, 77, American district judge (United States District Court for the District of Columbia).
- Juan José Rodríguez, 56, Argentine football player.
- Norton Simon, 86, American industrialist and philanthropist.
- Frans-Jozef van Thiel, 86, Dutch politician and lawyer.

=== 3 ===
- Werner Bochmann, 93, German composer.
- Frantz Casseus, 77, Haitian-American guitarist and composer.
- Joe Fortenberry, 82, American Olympic basketball player (1936), cancer.
- Bai Modi Joof, 59, Gambian lawyer.
- Carl Morris, 82, American abstract painter.
- Marcelle Neveu, 86, French Olympic middle-distance runner (1928).
- Richard Anthony Parker, 87, American egyptologist.
- Yeoh Ghim Seng, 74, Singaporean politician, lung cancer.

=== 4 ===
- Robert Checchi, 67, American set decorator.
- Molly Drake, 77, English poet and musician.
- Bernard Evslin, 71, American author, heart attack.
- Georgy Millyar, 89, Soviet and Russian actor.
- Bobby Reeves, 88, American baseball player (Washington Senators, Boston Red Sox).
- Erna Tauro, 76, Finnish-Swedish pianist and composer.
- Eric Trist, 83, English social scientist.

=== 5 ===
- Ida Adamoff, 82, French tennis player.
- Mike Bloom, 78, American basketball player (Boston Celtics, Minneapolis Lakers).
- Dupree Bolton, 64, American jazz trumpeter.
- Nello Carrara, 93, Italian physicist.
- Andres dela Cruz, 69, Filipino Olympic basketball player (1948).
- Peter Kalifornsky, 81, American writer and ethnographer.
- Gabriel Preil, 81, Estonian -American poet.
- George Strauss, 91, British politician.
- Conway Twitty, 59, American country music singer and songwriter, aneurysm.
- Wolf Graf von Baudissin, 86, German general peace researcher.

=== 6 ===
- James Bridges, 57, American film director and screenwriter (Urban Cowboy, The China Syndrome, White Hunter Black Heart), cancer.
- W. McNeil Lowry, 80, American businessman.
- Mort Mills, 74, American actor (Man Without a Gun, Perry Mason, Touch of Evil).
- Richard Norman, 61, British chemist.
- Ioan Reinhardt, 73, Romanian football player and manager.
- Peter Tazelaar, 73, Dutch resistance member and SOE operative during World War II.

=== 7 ===
- Evelyn Bark, 92, British humanitarian, first female recipient of the CMG (died 1993)
- Fabrizio Clerici, 80, Italian painter.
- Don Kent, 59, American professional wrestler, leukemia.
- Dražen Petrović, 28, Yugoslav and Croatian basketball player (Portland Trail Blazers, New Jersey Nets), and Olympian (1984, 1988, 1992), traffic collision.
- Louie Ramirez, 55, American boogaloo, salsa and latin jazz musician, heart attack.
- Skippy Roberge, 76, American baseball player (Boston Braves).
- Nils Johan Rud, 84, Norwegian novelist, children's writer, and magazine editor.
- Kurt Weitzmann, 89, American art historian.

=== 8 ===
- John Atyeo, 61, English football player.
- René Bousquet, 84, French political appointee and police chief, murdered.
- Roy Henshaw, 81, American baseball player.
- Sergei Javorski, 90, Estonian Olympic football player (1924).
- Anton Morosani, 85, Swiss Olympic ice hockey player (1928).
- José Nora, 52, Spanish Olympic basketball player (1960).
- Severo Sarduy, 56, Cuban poet, author, and playwright, AIDS related disease.
- Root Boy Slim, 48, American musician.

=== 9 ===
- Arthur Alexander, 53, American southern soul songwriter and singer, heart attack.
- Satyen Bose, 77, Indian film director.
- Juan Downey, 53, Chilean artist, cancer.
- Samuel Finer, 77, British political scientist and historian.
- Alexis Smith, 72, Canadian-American actress and singer, brain cancer.
- Charles E. Tuttle, 78, American publisher and book dealer.

=== 10 ===
- Arleen Auger, 53, American soprano, brain cancer.
- Les Dawson, 62, English comedian, actor, writer, and presenter, heart attack.
- Francis Ebejer, 67, Maltese dramatist and novelist.
- Piet Jan van der Giessen, 75, Dutch Olympic sailor (1952).
- Archie Macaulay, 77, Scottish football player and manager.
- Alice Reinheart, 83, American actress.
- Richard Webb, 77, American actor, suicide.

=== 11 ===
- M. C. Bradbrook, 84, British literary scholar.
- Bernard Bresslaw, 59, English comic actor, heart attack.
- Mikhail Chumakov, 83, Soviet and Russian microbiologist and virologist.
- Jack Conway, 74, American baseball player (Cleveland Indians, New York Giants).
- Karel Effa, 71, Czechoslovak actor.
- Jack Jennings, 66, American football player (Chicago Cardinals).
- Mstyslav, 95, Ukrainian Orthodox Church hierarch.
- Antonio Salcedo, 80, Filipino Olympic sprinter (1936).
- Ray Sharkey, 40, American actor (The Idolmaker, Wiseguy, Body Rock), AIDS-related complications.
- Milward L. Simpson, 95, American politician, governor and senator from Wyoming, parkinson's disease.
- Friedrich Thielen, 77, German politician.

=== 12 ===
- Gérard Côté, 79, Canadian marathon runner and Olympian (1948).
- Remo Galli, 80, Italian football player and coach.
- Wilhelm Gliese, 77, German astronomer.
- Alexander Koroviakov, 80, Soviet and Russian painter and art teacher.
- Ekrem Koçak, 62, Turkish middle distance runner and Olympian (1952, 1960).
- Monte Melkonian, 35, Armenian-American revolutionary, killed in action.
- Ivan Potrč, 80, Slovene writer and playwright.
- Warren Sandel, 72, American baseball player.
- Manuel Summers Rivero, 58, Spanish film director, screenwriter and actor, colorectal cancer.
- Binay Ranjan Sen, 95, Indian diplomat and civil servant.
- Ingeborg Weber-Kellermann, 74, German folklorist, anthropologist and ethnologist.

=== 13 ===
- John Campbell, 41, American blues guitarist, singer, and songwriter, heart attack.
- Ewald Dytko, 78, Polish football player and Olympian (1936).
- Ena Gregory, 87, Australian-American actress.
- Gajo Petrović, 66, Yugoslav-Croatian Marxist philosopher.
- Deke Slayton, 69, American Air Force pilot and aeronautical engineer, brain cancer.

=== 14 ===
- Étienne Borne, 86, French philosopher.
- Ruggero Chiesa, 59, Italian classical guitarist, teacher and editor.
- Ron Fisher, 81, Australian rules footballer.
- V. T. Hamlin, 93, American cartoonist (Alley Oop).
- Louis Jacquinot, 94, French lawyer and politician.

=== 15 ===
- Marjorie Clark, 83, South African track and field athlete and Olympic medalist (1928, 1932).
- Tahirou Congacou, 80, Beninese politician.
- John Connally, 76, American politician, pulmonary fibrosis.
- James Hunt, 45, British racing driver and media commentator, heart attack.
- Norman Park Ramsey, 70, American district judge (United States District Court for the District of Maryland).
- Petey Scalzo, 75, American featherweight boxing champion.
- Béla Sárosi, 74, Hungarian football player and manager.
- Don Smillie, 82, Canadian ice hockey player (Boston Bruins).
- Karl-Heinz Thun, 56, German Olympic sailor (1968, 1972).

=== 16 ===
- Elbrus Allahverdiyev, 34, Azerbaijani Armed Forces soldier, killed in action.
- Aldo Bini, 77, Italian road bicycle racer.
- J. Herbert Burke, 80, American politician, member of the United States House of Representatives (1967-1979).
- Lindsay Hassett, 79, Australian cricket player.
- Joe Lyons, 79, Australian rules footballer.
- Arad McCutchan, 80, American Hall of Fame college basketball coach (Evansville Purple Ace).
- Jørgen Weel, 70, Danish actor.

=== 17 ===
- Bud Germa, 72, Canadian politician.
- Angelo Longoni, 60, Italian football player.
- Guy Roberts, 93, American football player.
- Jean Savy, 86, French citizen and a commander in the French army.
- Adolfo Winternitz, 86, Peruvian artist of Austrian origin.

=== 18 ===
- Eva Arndt, 73, Danish swimmer and Olympic medalist (1936, 1948).
- Ben Auerbach, 74, American basketball player.
- Barnabás Berzsenyi, 75, Hungarian Olympic fencer (1952, 1956).
- Brynjulf Bull, 86, Norwegian lawyer and politician.
- Jean Cau, 67, French writer and journalist.
- Alexandra Hasluck, 84, Australian author and social historian.
- Narciso Perales Herrero, 78, Spanish politician and Falangist.
- Forbes Norris, 65, American Olympic swimmer (1948).
- Craig Rodwell, 52, American gay rights activist, stomach cancer.
- Luther Tucker, 57, American blues guitarist, heart attack.
- Martin Young, 69, English cricketer.

=== 19 ===
- Josef Dědič, 68, Czechoslovak figure skater and sport official.
- Raoul Degryse, 80, Belgian Olympic boxer (1936).
- Jack Duggan, 82, Australian politician.
- Helmut Fath, 64, German sidecar racer and engineer.
- Sir William Golding, 81, British novelist (Lord of the Flies, To the Ends of the Earth, The Inheritors), heart failure.
- Alex Hooks, 86, American baseball player (Philadelphia Athletics).
- Abraham Kaplan, 75, American philosopher.
- James Benton Parsons, 81, United States district judge
- Franco Scaglione, 76, Italian automobile coachwork designer.

=== 20 ===
- Jim Greenham, 77, Australian rules footballer.
- Frederick Johnson, 76, Canadian lawyer, judge, and politician.
- Viktor Makhorin, 44, Soviet and Russian Olympic handball player (1980), traffic collision.
- Keith Sinclair, 70, New Zealand poet and historian.
- György Sárosi, 80, Hungarian football player.

=== 21 ===
- Colin Dixon, 49, Welsh rugby player, stroke.
- Al Fairweather, 66, British jazz trumpeter.
- Alan J. Gould, 95, American newspaper writer and editor.
- Elisabeth Johansen, 85, Greenlandic midwife and politician.
- E. Grahame Joy, 104, American-born Canadian WW1 flying ace.
- Frank Moro, 49, Cuban-born American actor, heart attack.
- Kalika Prasad Shukla, 71, Indian sanskrit scholar and poet.

=== 22 ===
- Sir William Mount, 2nd Baronet, 88, British Army officer and High Sheriff of Berkshire.
- Emmett Berry, 77, American jazz trumpeter.
- Luigi Cuomo, 92, Italian Olympic fencer (1924).
- Rodolfo Díaz, 75, Mexican Olympic basketball player (1948).
- Victor Maddern, 65, English actor, brain cancer.
- Elisabeth Nagele, 60, Swiss luger and Olympian (1964).
- Pat Nixon, 81, First Lady of the United States (1969–1974) as wife of President Richard Nixon, lung cancer.
- Bubba Phillips, 65, American baseball player (Detroit Tigers, Chicago White Sox, Cleveland Indians).

=== 23 ===
- Flora Bramley, 83, British actress and comedian.
- Lance East, 92, British Olympic pentathlete (1928).
- Lina Galli, 94, Italian writer.
- Alexi Inauri, 85, Soviet and Georgian military officer.
- Zdeněk Kopal, 79, Czechoslovak astronomer.
- Albert Mangan, 78, American Olympic racewalker (1936).
- Dave Mays, 82, American baseball player.
- Swen Swenson, 63, Broadway dancer and singer, AIDS-related complications.

=== 24 ===
- Hans Beirer, 82, Austrian operatic tenor.
- Rich Matteson, 64, American jazz artist musician.
- Massimo Urbani, 36, Italian jazz alto saxophonist, heroin overdose.
- Gottlieb Wanzenried, 86, Swiss Olympic cyclist (1928).
- Archie Williams, 78, American Air Force officer, athlete, and Olympic champion (1936).

=== 25 ===
- Mona Baptiste, 67, Trinidad and Tobago singer and actress.
- Sergey Gorshkov, 90, Soviet lieutenant general.
- Hans Hopf, 76, German operatic tenor.
- Arturo Moreno, 84, Spanish comics artist and animator.
- Monique Piétri, 48, French Olympic swimmer (1964).
- Giovanni Tonoli, 46, Italian Olympic cyclist (1972).

=== 26 ===
- Roy Campanella, 71, American Hall of Fame baseball player (Brooklyn Dodgers), heart attack.
- William Ghosh, 64, Indian cricketer.
- Garo Kahkejian, 31, Armenian military commander, killed in action.
- William H. Riker, 72, American political scientist, cancer.
- James Thomas, 66, American blues musician and sculptor, stroke.
- Willy van Hemert, 81, Dutch actor, songwriter and theatre and television director.
- Ruth von Mayenburg, 85, Austrian journalist and writer.

=== 27 ===
- Layla Al-Attar, 49, Iraqi artist, painter and activist, U.S. missile attack.
- André Auville, 81, French racing cyclist.
- Dawson Buckley, 76, Australian rugby league footballer.
- Wolfgang Grams, 40, German member of the terrorist organisation RAF, suicide.
- Kurt Mahr, 59, German author, traffic collision.
- James Trifunov, 89, Canadian freestyle sport wrestler and Olympic medalist (1924, 1928, 1932).

=== 28 ===
- GG Allin, 36, American punk rock musician, opioid overdose.
- Gudrun Brost, 83, Swedish actress.
- Boris Christoff, 79, Bulgarian opera singer.
- Olga Costa, 79, Mexican painter and cultural promoter.
- Dovid Lifshitz, 87, American Haredi rabbi.
- Norman May, 76, Canadian Olympic wrestler (1948).
- Adelchi Pelaschier, 71, Italian Olympic sailor (1952, 1956).
- Didi Perego, 58, Italian actress, cancer.
- Mátyás Plachy, 63, Hungarian Olympic boxer (1952).

=== 29 ===
- Antonio Badú, 78, Mexican film actor and producer.
- Jimmy Fratianno, 79, Italian-American mobster and FBI informant.
- André Gillet, 76, Canadian politician, member of the House of Commons of Canada (1958-1962).
- Erwin Glock, 68, German Olympic sports shooter (1972, 1976).
- Héctor Lavoe, 46, Puerto Rican salsa singer, complications from AIDS.
- Patrick Lindsay, 79, Irish politician and lawyer.
- Sein Win, 74, Burmese military officer and politician.
- Bentong Kali, 32, Malaysian-Tamil criminal and gangster.

=== 30 ===
- Leo Camera, 78, American politician.
- Wong Ka Kui, 31, Hong Kong musician, singer and songwriter, cerebral hemorrhage.
- Ian MacIntosh, 66, Canadian ice hockey player (New York Rangers).
- Spanky McFarland, 64, American actor (Our Gang), heart attack.

== Sources ==
- Liebman, Roy (2000). The Wampas Baby Stars: A Biographical Dictionary, 1922–1934. Jefferson, North Carolina: McFarland. ISBN 0-7864-0756-5.
