= Bermuda at the 1948 Summer Olympics =

- IOC code: BER
- NOC: Bermuda Olympic Association

in London
- Competitors: 12 in 3 sports
- Flag bearer: Whitfield Fredrick Hayward
- Medals: Gold 0 Silver 0 Bronze 0 Total 0

Summer Olympics appearances (overview)
- 1936; 1948; 1952; 1956; 1960; 1964; 1968; 1972; 1976; 1980; 1984; 1988; 1992; 1996; 2000; 2004; 2008; 2012; 2016; 2020; 2024

Bermuda competed at the 1948 Summer Olympics in London, England.

== Background ==
On 22 June 1948, the Bermuda Olympic team was announced, which included: Hazzard Dill, Perry Johnson, Stanley Lines, Frank Mahoney, Phyllis Edness and Phyllis Lightbourn in athletics; Walter Bardgett, Robert Cook, Derek Oatway, Donald Shanks and Philip Tribley in swimming; and Frank Gosling in diving. Edness and Lightbourn were the only two female athletes, and they were the first two female athletes to compete for Bermuda at the Olympics. Since Lightbourn was racing first, she became the first female to represent Bermuda at the Olympics, while Edness became the first black woman to do so. The delegation also included D. J. Williams (track and field coach), James F. Murray (secretary), Mrs. W. F. Hayward (chaperone), W. F. Hayward (chef de mission), Bill Brooks (swimming coach) and Loraine Bruenig (Pan American Airways hostess). They boarded their flight for New York City on 13 July, before taking another flight to London.

W. F. Hayward was the flag bearer for the Bermudian team at the opening ceremony, where the Bermudian team was the seventh to enter the stadium. Each member of the team wore white doeskins and white helmets. Bardgett suffered from stomach pains during the ceremony which were attributed to the hot climate in the stadium at the time.

Upon returning to Bermuda on 29 August, the team was welcomed by 100 Bermudians.

== Athletics ==
=== Men ===
==== Track & road ====
Hazzard Dill, Perry Johnson, Stanley Lines and Frank Mahoney competed across four track events.

Bermudian men's results in track and road
Athlete	Event	Heat		Quarterfinal		Semi-final		Final		Ref
Athlete	Event	Result	Rank	Result	Rank	Result	Rank	Result	Rank	Ref
Hazzard Dill	200 m	—	5	did not advance						
Hazzard Dill	400 m	53.0	3	did not advance						
Perry Johnson	100 m	DQ	6	did not advance						
Perry Johnson	200 m	—	4	did not advance						
Stanley Lines	100 m	11.69 (Note: Automatically timed result. Although hand-timed results were used for the official results, some athletes only received automatically timed results.)	6	did not advance						
Stanley Lines	200 m	—	4	did not advance						
Frank Mahoney	100 m	11.8	3	did not advance						
Hazzard Dill Perry Johnson Stanley Lines Frank Mahoney	4 × 100 m relay	45.4	5	did not advance						

=== Women ===
==== Track & road ====
At the Bermuda Olympic Track and Field Trials, Phyllis Lightbourn and Phyllis Edness ran a time of 12.7 seconds in the 100 metres, which was faster than the Bermuda Olympic qualifying time of 13.3. The Royal Gazette wrote that there were "tremendous possibilities in the Olympics" with these performances. Phyllis Edness and Phyllis Lightbourn both competed in the women's 100 and 200 metres. After arriving in London, it was reported that Lightbourn and Edness were struggling to adapt to the warmer temperatures in London at the time.

Edness did not advance past the heats in either event. In the 200 metres she finished last and did not qualify. In the 100 metres, she was leading her heat 85 metres into the race, but she suffered from stomach cramps which slowed her down and caused her to drop from first to third, thereby not qualifying for the finals.

Lightbourn advanced to the semi-finals in both the 100 and 200 metres. In her 200 metres heat, she was in third position near the finish, but the second-place runner (Czechoslovakia's Olga Šicnerová) fell, which allowed Lightbourn to take second position and qualify for the semi-finals. Lightbourn also fainted at the finish line. She was treated by paramedics. She finished last in the semi-finals of both her events and thus did not qualify for any finals.

Bermudian women's results in swimming
Athlete	Event	Heat		Semi-final		Final		Ref
Athlete	Event	Result	Rank	Result	Rank	Result	Rank	Ref
Phyllis Edness	100 m	13.6	3	did not advance				
Phyllis Edness	200 m	—	5	did not advance				
Phyllis Lightbourn	100 m	13.0	2	13.65	6	did not advance		
Phyllis Lightbourn	200 m	27.0	2	—	7	did not advance		

==== Field ====
Phyllis Lightbourn was the only woman to compete in a field event. She competed in the long jump, where she jumped a distance of 5.23 metres to finish in fifteenth position overall.

== Diving ==
Bermuda's only competitor in diving was Frank Gosling, who scored 113.98 points to place tenth in the men's 3 metre springboard event.

== Swimming ==
Walter Bardgett, Robert Cook, Derek Oatway, Donald Shanks and Philip Tribley competed across five swimming events.

Bermudian men's results in swimming
Athlete	Event	Heat		Semi-final		Final		Ref
Athlete	Event	Time	Rank	Time	Rank	Time	Rank	Ref
Walter Bardgett	400 m freestyle	5:37.2	7	did not advance				
Robert Cook	400 m freestyle	5:37.9	6	did not advance				
Derek Oatway	100 m freestyle	1:08.6	6	did not advance				
Derek Oatway	400 m freestyle	5:20.9	6	did not advance				
Derek Oatway	1500 m freestyle	21:55.1	7	did not advance				
Donald Shanks	100 m backstroke	1:17.1	3	did not advance				
Philip Tribley	1500 m freestyle	22:56.6	7	did not advance				
Walter Bardgett Derek Oatway Robert Cook Philip Tribley	4 × 200 m freestyle	DQ	7	did not advance				
