= Swimming at the 1948 Summer Olympics – Men's 4 × 200 metre freestyle relay =

Men's 4 × 200 metre freestyle relay at the Games of the XIV Olympiad
- Venue: Wembley Arena
- Dates: 2 August 1948 (heats); 3 August 1948 (final)
- Competitors: 61 from 14 nations
- Teams: 14
- Winning time: 8:46.0 WR

Medalists
1st place, gold medalist(s)		Wally Ris, Jimmy McLane, Wally Wolf, Bill Smith	United States
2nd place, silver medalist(s)		Elemér Szathmáry, György Mitró, Imre Nyéki, Géza Kádas	Hungary
3rd place, bronze medalist(s)		Joseph Bernardo, René Cornu, Henri Padou, Jr., Alex Jany	France

The men's 4 × 200 metre freestyle relay event at the 1948 Olympic Games took place on 2 and 3 August at the Empire Pool. The relay featured teams of four swimmers each swimming four lengths of the 50 m pool freestyle.

== Results ==
=== Heats ===
Heat One

Place	Swimmers	Time	Qual.
1	Elemér Szathmáry, György Mitró, Imre Nyéki, and Géza Kádas (HUN)	8:53.6	QQ
2	Bob Gibe, William Dudley, Edwin Gilbert, and Eugene R. Rogers (USA)	8:55.9	QQ
3	Horacio White, José Durañona, Juan Garay, Alfredo Yantorno and Augusto Cantón (ARG)	9:16.9	QQ
4	Sérgio Rodrígues, Willy Otto Jordan, Rolf Kestener, and Aram Boghossian (BRA)	9:19.9	qq
5	Jesús Domínguez, Manuel Guerra, Isidoro Martínez-Vela, and Isidoro Pérez (ESP)	9:28.3	
6	Anwar Aziz Chaudhry, Iftikhar Ahmed Shah, Jaffar Ali Shah, and Sultan Karim Ali (PAK)	12:25.8	
7	Walter Bardgett, Derek Oatway, Robert Cook, and Philip Tribley (BER)		DQ

Heat Two

Place	Swimmers	Time	Qual.
1	Jo Bernardo, René Cornu, Henri Padou, Jr., and Alex Jany (FRA)	9:08.8	QQ
2	Vanja Illić, Ciril Pelhan, Janko Puhar, and Branko Vidović (YUG)	9:12.4	QQ
3	Martin Lundén, Per-Olof Östrand, Olle Johansson, and Per-Olof Olsson (SWE)	9:12.9	QQ
4	Ramón Bravo, Angel Maldonado, Apolonio Castillo, and Alberto Isaac (MEX)	9:23.4	qq
5	Roy Botham, Jack Hale, Norman Wainwright, and John Holt (GBR)	9:26.6	
6	Doug Gibson, Eric Jubb, Allen Gilchrist, and Peter Salmon (CAN)	9:43.2	
7	Ali Ahmed Bagdadi, Ahmed Kandil, Taha El-Gamal, and Mohamed Abdel Aziz Khalifa (EGY)	10:25.0	

=== Final ===
Place	Swimmers	Time	Notes
1	Walter Ris, Jimmy McLane, Wally Wolf, and Bill Smith (USA)	8:46.0	WR
2	Elemér Szathmáry, György Mitró, Imre Nyéki, and Géza Kádas (HUN)	8:48.4	
3	Jo Bernardo, René Cornu, Henri Padou, Jr., and Alex Jany (FRA)	9:08.0	
4	Martin Lundén, Per-Olof Östrand, Olle Johansson, Per-Olof Olsson (SWE)	9:09.1	
5	Vanja Illić, Ciril Pelhan, Janko Puhar, and Branko Vidović (YUG)	9:14.0	
6	Horacio White, José Durañona, Juan Garay, Alfredo Yantorno (ARG)	9:19.2	
7	Ramón Bravo, Angel Maldonado, Apolonio Castillo, and Alberto Isaac (MEX)	9:20.2	
8	Sérgio Rodrígues, Willy Otto Jordan, Rolf Kestener, and Aram Boghossian (BRA)	9:31.0	
