= Colombia at the 1948 Summer Olympics =

- IOC code: COL
- NOC: Colombian Olympic Committee

in London
- Competitors: 6 in 3 sports
- Medals: Gold 0 Silver 0 Bronze 0 Total 0

Summer Olympics appearances (overview)
- 1932; 1936; 1948; 1952; 1956; 1960; 1964; 1968; 1972; 1976; 1980; 1984; 1988; 1992; 1996; 2000; 2004; 2008; 2012; 2016; 2020; 2024; 2028

Colombia at the 1948 Summer Olympics in London, England was the nation's third appearance at the eleventh edition of the Summer Olympic Games. An all-male national team of six male athletes competed in six events in three sports.

== Fencing ==
Two fencers, both men, represented Colombia in 1948.

Men's foil

- Roberto Camargo

Men's épée

- Roberto Camargo
- Alfonso Ahumada

== Swimming ==
Men

Athlete	Event	Heat		Semifinal		Final	
Athlete	Event	Time	Rank	Time	Rank	Time	Rank
Luis Child	400 m freestyle	5:08.5	24	Did not advance			
Luis González	400 m freestyle	5:02.1	17	Did not advance			
Luis Child	1500 m freestyle	20:47.0	20	Did not advance			
Luis González	1500 m freestyle	20:40.6	16 Q	20:41.6	13	Did not advance	

== See also ==
- Sports in Colombia
