= Padou =

Padou is a French surname. Notable people with the surname include:

- Henri Padou (1898–1981), French water polo player and swimmer
- Henri Padou Jr. (1928–1999), French swimmer
