= Stained glass in Chile =

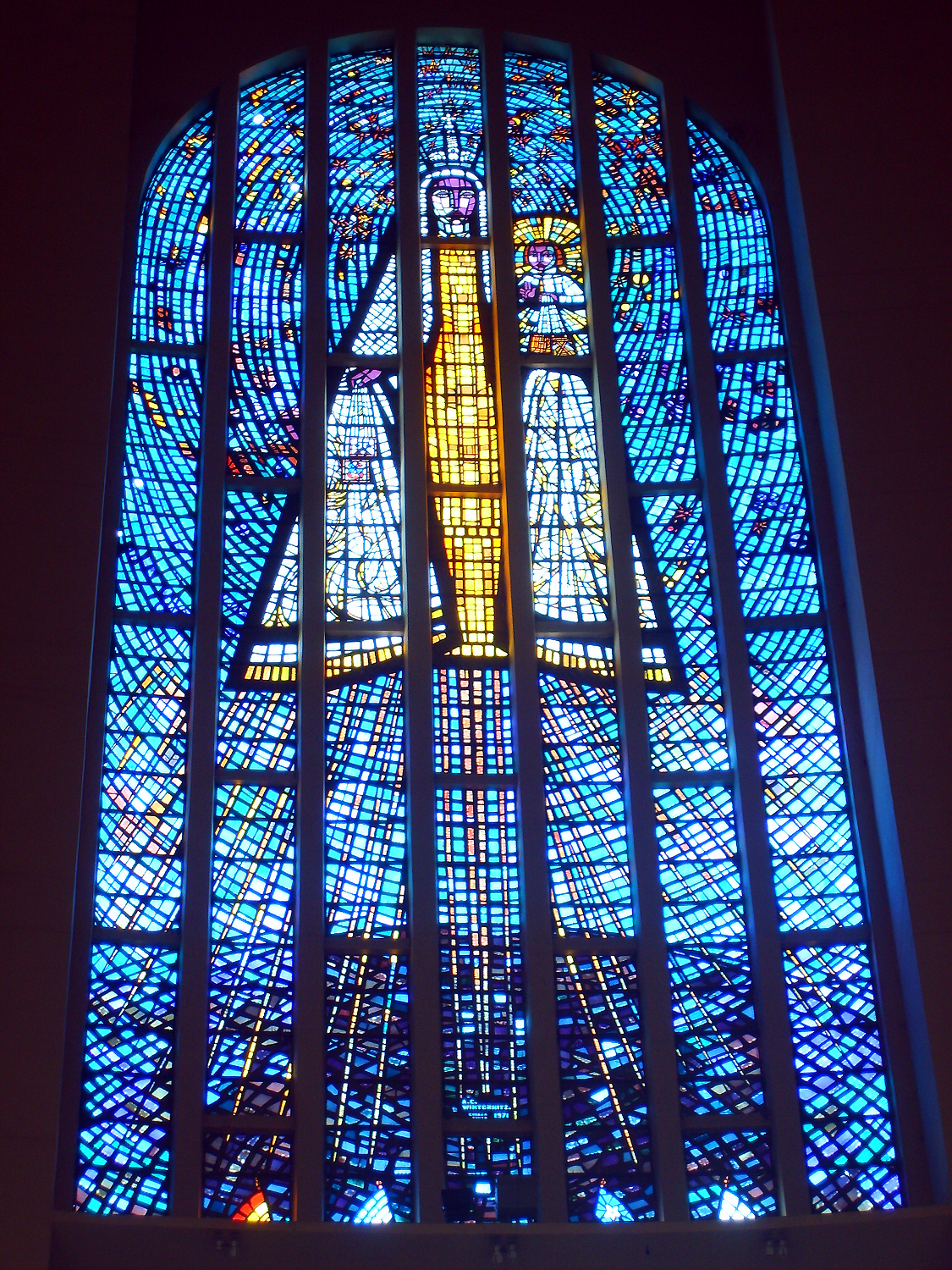
The principal window of the Temple of Maipú, depicting the Virgin Mary and Christ Child, by Adolfo Winternitz

Stained glass was first imported to Latin America during the 17th-18th century by Portuguese and Spanish settlers. For some countries, however, stained glass was imported much later.

For Chile, stained glass was imported in 1875, coinciding with the campaign to build an image of the new Chilean nation following independence. To bolster this national identity and this new preference for everything European, stained-glass windows imported from Europe followed the image program dictated by Rome and the Roman Catholic Church. They showed images of the Immaculate Conception, the Sacred Heart, and the religious congregation that settled in Latin America centuries prior. This campaign also meant that Chile opened itself up to commerce with other countries as well as immigration from certain European countries through the implementation of state policies. This new influx of people created a complex society made up of skilled laborers, including stained glass artists.

By the 20th century, many European artists had begun to establish their own studios within Latin America and had started up local production. With these new local studios came inventive techniques and less traditional imagery. For example, in Ecuador, a group of contemporary artists developed stained-glass art and mixed it with glass fusing and mosaic to create something entirely unique.

While some stained glass was made locally, most stained glass was still being imported from Europe. One way that European studios distributed their work to Latin America was through international exhibitions. These international exhibitions influenced the global style and consumption of stained glass in an enormous way by expanding it from a solely religious art form into a more secular context. As of today, there are approximately 250 monuments with stained glass windows that hold historical, artistic, and cultural significance.

== Major works ==
=== Basílica Nuestra Señora de Lourdes ===
The Basílica Nuestra Señora de Lourdes is located in Santiago, Chile and it's stained glass windows were designed by the French artist Gabriel Loire. The altar window speaks to the program that Loire developed by representing traditional saints together with more modern saints like Catalina Lobouré. There is also a large focus on the Virgin within the imagery of the windows. Throughout the north and south transepts there are 16 devotions to the Virgin highlighting the local popularity, not seen as much in Europe. This was purposefully done as a response to the conflict within the Catholic Church surrounding the 'popular devotion' to the Virgin by Latin American Catholics which was looked down upon by Rome because the festivities of the Virgin are events that the Church did not play a meditating role. The technique used by Loire was also a modern technique, looked down upon by more traditional models, called dalle de verre.

=== Templo Vótivo de Maipú ===
The Templo Vótivo de Maipú in Maipú Chile was dedicated to the Virgen del Carmen by Liberator Bernardo O'Higgins who promised to erect the church if he was victorious. The stained glass windows were designed by Adolfo Winternitz. At the time of its creation, the size of the stained glass design was the largest on the continent and one of the largest pieces in the world. The church functions in both a religious and patriotic sense through its imagery of the Virgin as well as scenes from the parables. Surrounding those cycles are abstract scenes that evoke the Chilean geography from north to south.

== Conservation efforts ==
Despite the large amount of stained glass windows throughout Latin America there is very little research being done surrounding these windows in part due to a lack of understanding of the heritage countries in Latin America have as well as the environmental conditions of the area not being studied before. With little research being done, there is serious concern that the windows will deteriorate over time and along with them the history that they hold.

The first conservation studies on stained glass in Latin America are only from the 21st century.
