= 1951 NCAA swimming and diving championships =

American college aquatic sports competition

- Host city: Austin, Texas
- Date(s): March 1951
- Venue(s): Gregory Gymnasium; University of Texas at Austin
- Teams: 22
- Events: 14

The 1951 NCAA swimming and diving championships were contested in March 1951 at the pool at Gregory Gymnasium at the University of Texas at Austin in Austin, Texas at the 15th annual NCAA-sanctioned swim meet to determine the team and individual national champions of men's collegiate swimming and diving among its member programs in the United States.

Yale finished on top of the team standings, earning the Bulldogs' their third national title.

== Program ==
- The 150-yard backstroke was eliminated from the championship program this year. Previously included in the program since 1925, it was replaced by the 200-yard backstroke (initially introduced the prior year).

== Team standings ==
- (H) = Hosts
- (DC) = Defending champions
- Italics = Debut appearance

Rank	Team	Points
1st place, gold medalist(s)	Yale	81
2nd place, silver medalist(s)	Michigan State	60
3rd place, bronze medalist(s)	Ohio State (DC)	58
4	Stanford	25
5	Texas (H)	15
6	Iowa State	14
6	Princeton	14
8	Michigan	12
9	Iowa	12
9	Washington	10
11	Dartmouth	8
12	Purdue	7
13	Indiana	6
13	USC	6
15	Oklahoma	4
15	Rutgers	4
17	Harvard	3
18	Minnesota	2
19	California	1
19	Florida State	1
19	Georgia	1
19	Northwestern	1

== Individual events ==
=== Swimming ===
Event	Champion	Team	Time
50 yard freestyle	Clark Scholes	Michigan State	22.9
100 yard freestyle	Clark Scholes (DC)	Michigan State	51.0
220 yard freestyle	(Australia) John Marshall	Yale	2.05.6
440 yard freestyle	(Australia) John Marshall	Yale	4:30.2
1,500 meter freestyle	(Australia) John Marshall	Yale	18:18.8
100 yard backstroke	Richard Thoman	Yale	57.5
200 yard backstroke	Jack Taylor	Ohio State	2:07.3
100 yard butterfly	Bob Brawner (DC)	Princeton	1:01.1
200 yard butterfly	Bob Brawner (DC)	Princeton	2:18.6
150 yard individual medley	(Canada) Peter Salmon	Washington	1:32.4
400 yard freestyle relay	David Hoffman; James Quigley; Clark Scholes; George Hoogerhyde	Michigan State	3:26.7
300 yard medley relay	Jack Taylor; Gerald Holan; Herbert Kobayashi	Ohio State	2:52.2

=== Diving ===
Event	Champion	Team	Score
1 meter diving	Skippy Browning	Texas	131.43
3 meter diving	Skippy Browning	Texas	144.75

== See also ==
- List of college swimming and diving teams
