= Ajnala =

Ajnala may refer to:

- Ajnala, India
  - Ajnala Assembly Constituency
- Ajnala, Pakistan
