= Donald Shanks =

Donald Shanks can refer to:

- Donald Shanks (bass-baritone) (1930–2011), Australian operatic bass-baritone
- Don Shanks (stuntman) (born 1950), American actor and stuntman
- Don Shanks (footballer) (born 1952), British footballer
- Donald Shanks (swimmer) (born 1923), a Bermudian swimmer
