= Perry Johnson =

Perry Johnson may refer to:

- Perry Johnson (sprinter) (1924–1999), Bermudian sprinter
- Perry Johnson (ice hockey) (b. 1977), Canadian ice hockey player
- Perry Johnson (businessman) (born 1948), American businessman and political candidate
