= Edwin Gilbert =

Edwin Gilbert may refer to:

- Edwin Gilbert (writer) (1907–1976), American novelist, playwright and scriptwriter
- Edwin Gilbert (swimmer) (born 1929), American former swimmer
