= Csordás =

Csordás is a Hungarian surname. Notable people with the surname include:

- Csaba Csordás (born 1977), Hungarian swimmer
- György Csordás (1928–2000), Hungarian swimmer
- Lajos Csordás (1932–1968), Hungarian footballer
