= Mancuso =

Mancuso is an Italian surname derived from a Sicilian noun, related to the Italian mancino, which means "left-handed". An alternate form can be Mancusi. Notable people with the surname include:

- Adolfo Mancuso (born 1930), Argentine swimmer
- Alejandro Mancuso (born 1968), Argentine footballer
- Anna Mancuso (born 1971), Canadian politician
- Ciro Mancuso (born 1949), Nevada-based drug dealer convicted of running a $140-million marijuana smuggling operation
- David Mancuso (1944–2016), American DJ
- Eros Mancuso (born 1999), Argentine footballer
- Filippo Mancuso (1922–2011), Italian judge and politician
- Francis Xavier Mancuso (1887–1970), leader of Tammany Hall and judge for New York's Court of General Sessions
- Frank Mancuso Jr. (born 1958), movie producer
- Gianluca Mancuso (born 1998), Argentine footballer
- Graciela Mancuso (1947–2016), Argentine presenter
- Gus Mancuso (1905–1984), catcher in Major League Baseball from 1928 to 1945
- Julia Mancuso (born 1984), American alpine skier who won a gold medal at the 2006 Winter Olympics
- Laurence Mancuso (1934–2007), founding abbot of the New Skete monastery
- Leonardo Mancuso (born 1992), Italian footballer
- Matteo Mancuso (born 1996), Italian jazz and rock guitarist and composer
- Nick Mancuso (born 1948), Italian-Canadian cinema and stage actor
- Renee Mancuso, American bridge player
- Rudy Mancuso (born 1992), American actor, Internet personality and musician
- Salvatore Mancuso (born 1964), Colombian paramilitary warlord
- Stefano Mancuso (born 1965), Italian botanist and writer

== In fiction ==
- Angelo Mancuso in the novel A Confederacy of Dunces (1980) by author John Kennedy Toole
- Bart Mancuso, played by Scott Glenn in the film The Hunt for Red October (1990)
- Nick Mancuso, played by Robert Loggia in the television miniseries Favorite Son (1988) and the television crime series Mancuso, F.B.I. (1989)
