= Jack Hakim =

Egyptian swimmer (born 1931)

Personal information
- Born: 10 October 1931

Sport
- Sport: Swimming

Jack Hakim (born 10 October 1931) is an Egyptian former swimmer. He competed in the men's 400 metre freestyle at the 1948 Summer Olympics and the water polo tournament at the 1952 Summer Olympics.
