= Bob Gibe =

American swimmer (1928–2005)

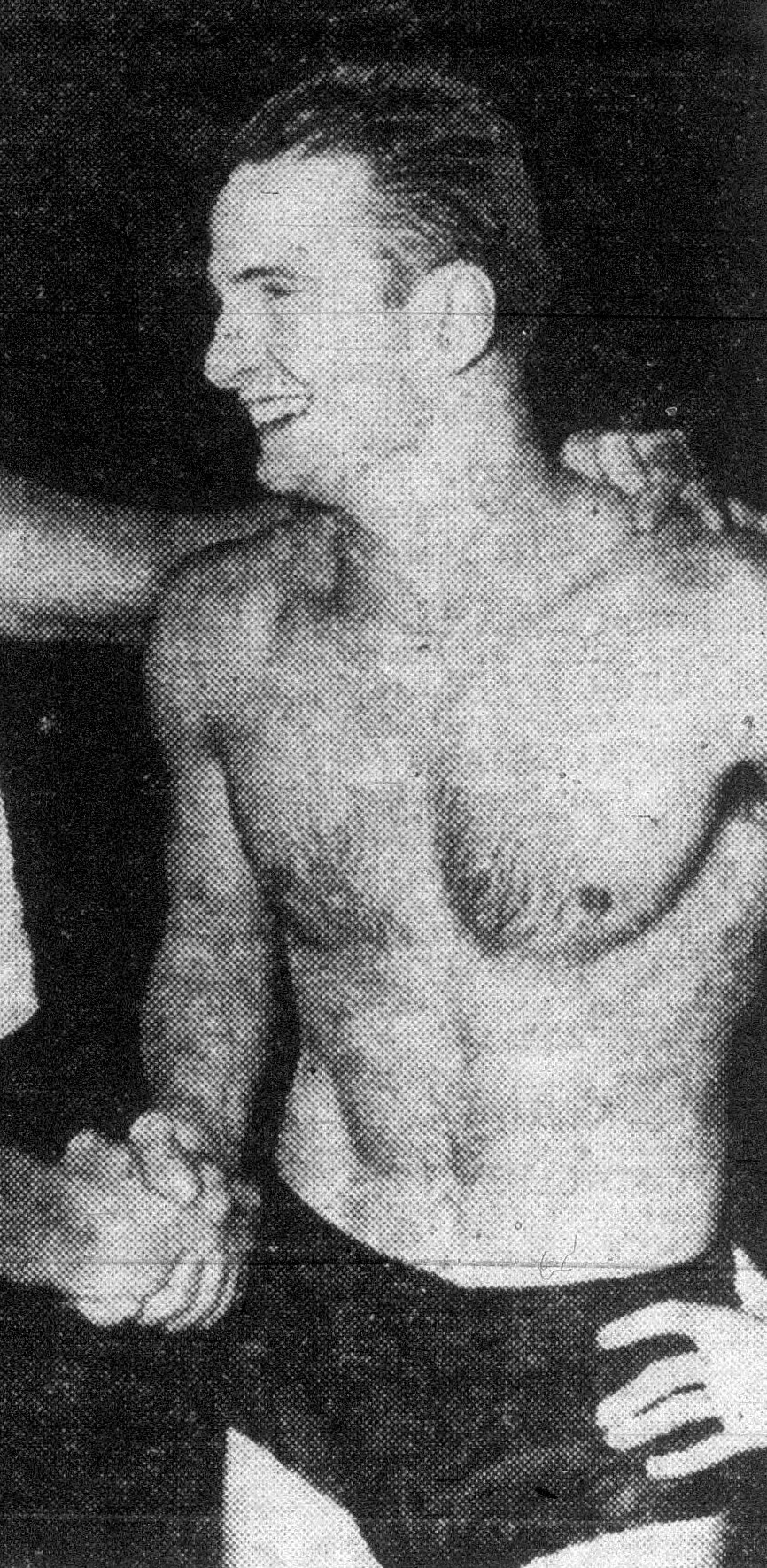
- Gibe near the height of his swimming career in 1949

Personal information
- Full name: Robert Jerome Gibe
- Nickname: "Bob"
- National team: United States
- Born: August 10, 1928 Chicago, Illinois, U.S.
- Died: August 27, 2005 (aged 77) Palm Harbor, Florida, U.S.
- Education: Wayne State University

Sport
- Sport: Swimming
- Strokes: Freestyle
- Club: Detroit Athletic Club
- Coach: John Newman (Lane Technical High); Robert R. H. Kiphuth (Olympics)

Robert Jerome Gibe (August 10, 1928 – August 27, 2005) was an American competition swimmer who attended Wayne State University and represented the United States at the 1948 Summer Olympics in London swimming in the preliminaries of the 4x200 freestyle relay event. He swam for the strong swimming program at Lane State Technical High School in Chicago, Illinois.

== Early life ==
Robert Jibe was born August 10, 1928 in Chicago, Illinois. He attended Lane Technical High School, a large Public School on Chicago's North Side, where he swam for the strong and regionally dominant swimming program coached by John Newman. As a High School Junior at 15, while swimming for Lane Technical, Gibe was a defending champion in the 50 and 100 yard events, when he qualified for the Chicago City League 25-yard pool championship at Roosevelt High in April, 1944. In qualifying times for the City League Championship, he swam the fastest qualifying times in the 50-yard event of :25.6, and in the 100-yard event of 58.4. In February, 1945, Gibe helped lead Lane Technical High to the Illinois State Championship with a victory over New Trier High School in a close meet. At the State Championship, Gibe won the 50-yard freestyle in :24.9 and the 100-yard freestyle in 55.3. In June, 1945, Gibe received All American honors for his performance in the 50-yard freestyle.

Gibe attended Wayne State University, and though they had a swim team, he swam primarily for the Detroit Athletic Club during his collegiate years. Representing Detroit Athletic Club in early April, 1949, he won the 220-yard freestyle with a time of 2:10.8 at the AAU National Championship indoor meet at Daytona Beach Florida, and placed second in the 100-yard freestyle. Gibe won the 100-yard AAU freestyle championship in 1949.

At the 1948 trials for the Olympics that year, Gibe finished third in the 200 meter freestyle, qualifying for the 4x200 freestyle relay.

== 1948 London Olympics ==
On February 8, 1948, Gibe swam for the gold medal-winning U.S. team in the preliminary heats of the men's Olympic 4×200-meter freestyle relay that swam a combined time of 8:55.90. His preliminary team consisted of Bill Dudley of New Orleans, Ed Gilbert of Austin, and Gene Rodgers of New York. Gibe did not swim in the finals, but his preliminary team finished in a time allowing the Americans to progress to the next round. International Swimming Hall of Fame inductee, and Yale swim Coach Robert “Bob” Kiphuth coached the U.S. men's swim team in 1948. However, Gibe did not receive a medal because under the Olympic swimming rules in effect in 1948, relay swimmers who swam in preliminary heats only for teams that later won medals in the finals were not eligible.

Gibe died August 27, 2005 in Palm Harbor, Florida.

== See also ==
- List of Wayne State University people
