= Jack Taylor (swimmer) =

American swimmer

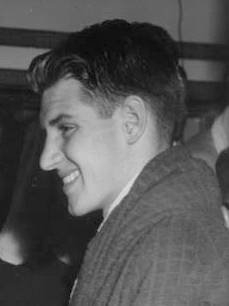
- Taylor in 1950

Personal information
- Full name: Jack George Neil Taylor
- National team: United States
- Born: January 31, 1931 Akron, Ohio, U.S.
- Died: May 30, 1955 (aged 24) near Guantanamo Bay Naval Base, Cuba

Sport
- Sport: Swimming
- Strokes: Backstroke
- Club: Akron YMCA; Firestone Swim Club; U.S. Navy
- College team: Ohio State University (OSU)
- Coach: Harold Minto (Firestone SC); Mike Peppe OSU
Medal record
Representing the United States
Olympic Games
Bronze medal – third place	1952 Helsinki	100 m backstroke
Representing Ohio State
NCAA
Gold medal – first place	1950 Columbus	1,500 meter freestyle
Gold medal – first place	1950 Columbus	150 yard backstroke
Gold medal – first place	1951 Austin	200 yard backstroke
Gold medal – first place	1951 Austin	300 yard medley relay
Gold medal – first place	1952 Princeton	Team event
Gold medal – first place	1952 Princeton	100 yard backstroke

Jack George Neil Taylor (January 31, 1931 – May 30, 1955) was an American competition swimmer who competed for Ohio State University, and was an Olympic bronze medalist in the 100-meter backstroke at the 1952 Helsinki Olympics. Enlisting after the Olympics in June 1952 after graduating Ohio State, Jack died prematurely three years later at the age of 24 during his service with the U.S. Navy Air Corps when he crashed his fighter plane while practicing landing exercises at Guantanamo Bay, Cuba on May 30, 1955.

== Early life and swimming ==
Taylor was born in Akron, Ohio, on January 31, 1931, to Mr. and Mrs. Ross Morse Taylor, and attended Akron's Buchtel High School graduating in 1948. Taylor's father Ross worked as a Manager in the Auditing Department for the local Firestone Tire and Rubber Company in Akron, the company that acted as Jack's swimming sponsor. Jack began swimming first with the Akron YMCA while still in elementary school where he was coached by Harry Weller. In High School, by his Freshman year, he continued swimming both for the Firestone Swim Club under Harry Minto and for his own Buchtel High School swim team in Akron. Minto, who coached at the Firestone Aquatic Club from around 1936–1948, where he trained and mentored 22 All Americans during his long career, was an Associate Coach for the American swimming team at the 1948 Olympics. At the 1947 Junior National AAU championship in New Jersey, Taylor set records in the 3-mile long-distance event and the 440 yard freestyle. He lifted the Firestone Swim team to a victory when he broke rival Jimmy McLane's former record in the 3-mile long-distance event, which McLane had established three years prior.

At 16, on August 14, 1947, at the Ohio State Senior Swimming Championship in Cincinnati, Taylor placed first in the 800-yard freestyle with a time of 9:51.4, leading the Firestone Club men's team to an overall third-place team finish. In a close 800 yard event, Taylor closed and passed second place Ted Stevens of Cleveland in the final 100 yards. As noted earlier, one of Taylor's chief rivals at the Firestone Club was Hall of Fame swimmer, and three-time freestyle Olympic gold medalist Jimmy McLane. During his swimming career at Buchtel High, Taylor established records in both District and Akron-wide competition in the 100-yard backstroke event.

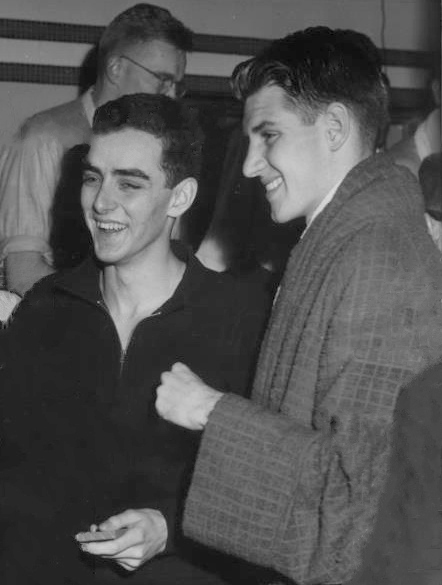
Taylor (right) with Firestone swimmer and Olympic gold medalist Jimmy McLane (left), 1950

As a Buchtel High Senior in February 1948, at the Greater Akron Aquatic Championships, Taylor recorded a winning scholastic record time of 61.4 seconds in the 100-yard backstroke, and a winning scholastic record time of 44.7 seconds in the 75-yard Individual Medley, breaking two of his own former times. At the same 1948 Greater Akron Championships, he swam on a winning team that broke the meet record for the 150-yard Medley Relay with a time of 1:27.8. In one of his last swims for the Firestone Club, Taylor swam a 19:48.1 for the 1,500-meter freestyle at the Men's AAU championship at Cuyahoga Falls, breaking the Ohio AAU record, and the Northeastern Ohio District Record. Taylor finished 5.2 seconds ahead of rival and fellow Firestone Club swimmer Jimmy McLane, shown at left, establishing a four-length lead in only the last 150 meters of the event. The win gave Taylor both the indoor and outdoor 1500 meter titles.

== 1948 Olympic trials in Detroit ==
At the age of 17, at the 1948 U.S. London Olympic trials in Detroit, Taylor placed fourth in his 1500-meter event trial final with a time of 20:25.8 with fellow Firestone club swimmer Jimmy McLane placing first with a time of 19:27.7. Taylor would have required a third-place finish to qualify for the U.S. team. Taylor had qualified one day earlier for the trial finals in the 1500 meter trial preliminary swim placing second with a time of 20:06.9, the second fastest time behind Jimmy McLane, but, as noted, he did not finish high enough in the 1500 meter event trial final to qualify for the U.S. team.

== Ohio State University ==
He attended Ohio State University, where he swam for the Ohio State Buckeyes swimming and diving team in National Collegiate Athletic Association (NCAA) competition from 1950 to 1952, graduating with a degree in Business Administration in 1952. Taylor was a member of Sphinx, an Ohio State academic and social honorary for Seniors and was a member of Sigma Chi Fraternity. As a swimmer for Ohio State, he was mentored and trained by Hall of Fame Head Coach Mike Peppe. In his earliest years at Ohio State, Taylor established a 1,500-meter record swimming at the 1950 NCAA National Championship, where the Ohio State swim team defeated Robert J. H. Kiphuth's powerful Yale swim team with a score of 65–43 in front of an enthusiastic home crowd at the Ohio State swimming facility. At the 1950 NCAA championship, Taylor was top scorer with 18 points.

Two years later, at the 1952 NCAA Championship at Yale University, Ohio State achieved the highest points total of 94 ever accumulated at an NCAA championship, and defeated the strong runner-up Yale team coached by Robert J. H. Kiphuth. At the 1952 National NCAA Meet, Taylor set a collegiate record in one of his signature events, the 100-yard backstroke. His performance in the 100 and 200-yard backstroke placed him on the All-American swimming team. A highly accomplished swimmer at Ohio State, Taylor captured eight Championships in the Big Ten Conference including fourteen individual titles, and four championships in the National Collegiate Athletic Association. In competition outside the collegiate ranks, he won two National American Athletic Union championships. As an exceedingly versatile swimming competitor, he won his championships in backstroke events, the long 1500-meter freestyle, and the 440 yard freestyle.

On a year-by-year basis, Taylor's titles in NCAA competition included one in 1950 in the 1,500 free event, a 150-yard backstroke title in 1950, and a title in 1952 in the 100-yard backstroke. In the longer backstroke event, he captured an NCAA title in 1951 in the 200-yard backstroke competition. In 1948, he captured the 1500-meter freestyle event in both indoor and outdoor American Athletic Union national championships. In American Athletic Union indoor competition, he won both the 100 and 200 yard backstroke events in 1951. Through 1955, as a competitor with multiple stroke skills, Taylor's Ohio State Record in the 300-yard Medley was still in place.

== 1952 Helsinki Olympic bronze ==
At the 1952 Summer Olympics in Helsinki, Finland, as a 21-year-old, Taylor received a bronze medal for his third-place finish in the event final of the men's 100-meter backstroke where he swam a 1:06.4, touching only .2 seconds behind Gilbert Bozon of France who took the silver with a time of 1:06.2. American Yoshi Oyakawa took the gold in the record time of 1:05.4 breaking a 16-year Olympic record which had been established in 1936.

Taylor married Jacksonville, Florida's Iris Ann Owens at Riverside Baptist Church in Jacksonville on Friday evening, September 10, 1954, having met her while training as a Navy pilot at Cecil Field. Taylor's brother James Farris Taylor acted as best man, and several Lieutenants who had served with Taylor at Cecil field acted as ushers, forming an arch of swords as guests were leaving. A reception was held at the Officers Club at Jacksonville's Naval Air Station, and the couple planned a wedding trip to Nassau. A Jacksonville native, Taylor's bride Iris had received her B.A. from the University of Florida.

=== Naval service and death ===
Serving from his enlistment on June 6, 1952, through May 30, 1955, Taylor became a naval aviator in the Naval Air Corps of the United States Navy where he was trained as a Fighter Pilot for Attack Squadron 105 and reached the rank of Lieutenant Junior Grade. His premature death at age 24 on May 30, 1955, came while practicing landings on a strip of land simulating an aircraft carrier at Guantanamo Bay Naval Base, Cuba. Waved away during an approach to land, his AD-4 Skyraider, a Douglas fighter plane, failed to climb straight up, and when a wing tip contacted the ground, the plane spun in a cartwheel. Taylor was survived by his wife Iris Ann and younger brother James. After services on June 4, 1955, conducted by Jacksonville, Florida's Estes Kraus Funeral Home, he was buried at Jacksonville's Oak Lawn Cemetery.

=== Honors ===
On June 10, 1955, the Ohio State House of Representatives passed a resolution to honor Taylor as both an outstanding athlete and American patriot introduced by the Summitt County Delegation. He became an inductee of Ohio State University's sports hall of fame in 1983.

== See also ==
- List of Ohio State University people
- List of Olympic medalists in swimming (men)
