= Phyllis Edness =

Bermudian sprinter (1930–c.2007)

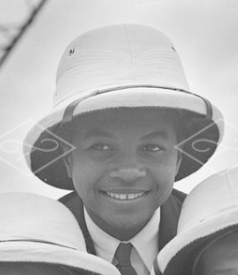
- Edness in 1948

Personal information
- Born: 8 April 1930 Bermuda
- Died: before 2007

Sport
- Sport: Sprinting
- Event(s): 100 metres, 200 metres

Phyllis Adelle Edness-Holland (born 8 April 1930 – before 2007) was a Bermudian sprinter. She was selected to be part of the Bermudian team at the 1948 Summer Olympics and was one of the favourites to win the women's 100 metres. She was the first Black woman and one of the first women to represent Bermuda at a Games.

At the Games, she did not make past the preliminary rounds of the women's 100 metres and women's 200 metres, citing stomach cramps for the former. After the Games, she studied at Central State University and graduated in 1956. She married in the same year of her graduation and died sometime before 2007.

== Biography ==
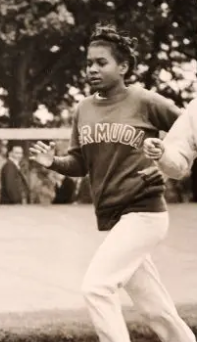
Edness training before the 1948 Summer Games

Phyllis Adelle Edness was born on 8 April 1930 in Bermuda to Joseph and Myrtle Edness, who hail from Pembroke Parish. Her cousin was eventual acting premier Quinton Edness. Phyllis studied at Sandy's Secondary School in Somerset Village, Bermuda.

Coming into the 1948 Summer Olympics in London, Edness was stated by The Royal Gazette as one of the favourites to win the gold medal in the women's 100 metres. While representing her school at the Bermudian Olympic trials, she had placed first and broke the Bermudian record in the women's 100 metres with a time of 12.7 seconds. This time was also faster than the Bermudian Olympic selection standard of 13.3 seconds. In the same trials, she had also broken the Bermudian record in the women's 200 metres with a time of 27.5 seconds.

She was announced to be part of the Bermudian team at the 1948 Summer Olympics on 22 June 1948 at a ceremony held by the Bermuda Olympic Association. In the lead-up to the games she and other members of the athletics team were coached by DJ Williams. At a practice session at Prospect Garrison Field, she had broken her personal best time in the 100 metres with a time of 12.4 seconds according to The Royal Gazette.

Edness and the rest of the team left for New York City on 13 July to travel to London for the 1948 Summer Games. Edness and fellow sprinter Phyllis Lightbourn-Jones were the only two women on the twelve-person Bermudian team, and Edness became the first Black woman and second woman overall when she competed in heat eight of the 100 metres on 31 July (Lightbourn-Jones's first appearance was in heat five). She and Lightbourn-Jones struggled to adapt to the climate of London at the time.

Edness first competed in the preliminary rounds of the women's 100 metres on 31 July against four other athletes. She was leading the race for 85 metres but had a bout of stomach cramps and eventually finished with a time of 13.6 seconds. She placed third and did not qualify for the semifinals. She then competed in the preliminary rounds of the women's 200 metres five days later on 5 August against four other athletes. She placed last in her heat (Note: The Royal Gazette reported that she had placed fourth, overtaking Melânia Luz in the last few moments.) and did not advance further to the semifinals.

After the 1948 Olympic Games, she studied at Central State University in Wilberforce, Ohio, and graduated with a degree majoring in physical education in 1956. In the same year, she married Jackson Holland in New York City. She would adopt the married name of Phyllis Adelle Edness-Holland. She later died sometime before 2007.
