= Phyllis Lightbourn-Jones =

Bermudian sprinter (born 1928)

Personal information
- Full name: Phyllis Marjorie Lightbourn-Jones-Sherburne
- Born: Phyllis Lightbourn; 8 August 1928 (age 97) Bermuda

Sport
- Sport: Sprinting, long jump
- Events: 100 metres, 200 metres, long jump

Phyllis Marjorie Lightbourn-Jones-Sherburne (born 8 August 1928) is a Bermudian former sprinter and long-jumper who represented Bermuda at the 1948 and 1952 Summer Olympics. After qualifying for the 1948 Olympics through the Bermudian Olympic Trials, she competed in the 100 metres, 200 metres, and the long jump at the Games. She reached the semi-finals of the 100 and 200 metres and was eliminated in the heats of the long jump. During the games, Lightbourn-Jones became the first woman to represent Bermuda at the Olympics. She qualified again through the Bermuda Olympic Trials for the 1952 Olympics, where she competed in the 100 metres and the long jump. She was eliminated in the first round of both events.

After retiring from competitive athletics, she married and moved to Alaska and then to New London, Connecticut, where she was a volunteer coach at the United States Coast Guard Academy. This position made her the first female track coach to work at a higher institution in the United States.

== Biography ==
Phyllis Marjorie Lightbourn was born on 8 August 1928 in Bermuda. At the age of seven, she began participating in athletics, and after World War II, she broke several Bermudian records in multiple events.

=== 1948 Olympics ===
By 1948, Lightbourn had become the Bermuda champion in the women's 100 metres. At the 1948 Bermuda Olympic Track and Field Trials for the 1948 Summer Olympics in London, Phyllis Edness beat her in the 100 metres event. Both Lightbourn and Edness ran a time of 12.7 seconds, which was faster than the Bermuda Olympic qualifying time of 13.3, and The Royal Gazette wrote that there were "tremendous possibilities in the Olympics" with these performances. On 22 June 1948, the Bermuda Olympic team was announced, which included Lightbourn as one of twelve athletes selected for the team. The only other female athlete on the team was Edness. After arriving in London, it was reported that Lightbourn and Edness were struggling to adapt to the warmer temperatures in London at the time. Through the Olympics, the athletics team coach was D. J. Williams. At the Olympics, she competed in the 100 metres, 200 metres, and the long jump. Her first appearance was in heat five of the 100 metres on 31 July 1948, in which she competed in heat five, becoming the first female to represent Bermuda at the Olympics. Edness ran in heat eight shortly afterwards. In the 100 metres, she placed second in her heat to qualify for the semi-finals with a time of 13.0 seconds. She was eliminated in the semi-finals after running a time of 13.65 to finish sixth (last). In her 200 metres heat, she was in third position near the finish, but the second-place runner (Czechoslovakia's Olga Šicnerová) fell, which allowed Lightbourn to take second position and qualify for the semi-finals with a time of 27.0. Lightbourn also fainted at the finish line. She was treated by paramedics. She was eliminated in semi-finals after finishing seventh (last). In the long jump, she finished seventh out of thirteen in her heat with a jump of 5.23 metres that was not far enough to qualify for the semi-finals. The Royal Gazette wrote that Lightbourn was the most outstanding track and field performer representing the Colony.

=== 1952 Olympics ===
At the 1952 Bermuda Olympic Trials, Phyllis, now competing under the surname "Jones" won the long jump with a new Bermudian record of 17 feet and 2$\textstyle\frac{1}{2}$ inches (5.26 metres). She also placed second behind Thelma Jones in the 100 metres with a time of 12.3. She qualified for the Bermudian Olympic team in both events. Again, the athletics team coach was Williams. On 16 June 1952, the Bermuda Olympic team was announced, including Phyllis Jones as one of the six Bermudian athletes.

At the 1952 Summer Olympics in the 100 metres, she was eliminated after finishing fifth (last) in her heat with a time of 13.55. In the long jump, she did not progress to the final after jumping 4.92 metres, finishing 33rd in the qualifying round. The Royal Gazette reported that Jones injured her leg, which hindered her performances.

=== Later life ===
In 1953, she was awarded Bermuda's Athlete of the year by the Bermudian Amateur Athletic Association. After briefly retiring, Lightbourn competed in the Bermuda athletics championships in 1954. In 1955, she married Gilbert Sherburne, an American naval officer, and subsequently retired from athletic competition. She moved first to Alaska, then to New London, Connecticut. In New London, she worked as a volunteer coach at the United States Coast Guard Academy. Her work there made her the first female track coach to work at a higher institution in the United States. She later moved with her husband to Florida.
