= Juan Garay =

Argentine swimmer

Personal information
- Full name: Juan Carlos Garay
- Born: August 20, 1928 Ensenada, Argentina
- Died: May 2009 (aged 80) La Plata, Argentina

Sport
- Sport: Swimming
- Strokes: Freestyle

Juan Garay (August 20, 1928 – May 2009) was an Argentine swimmer who competed at the 1948 Summer Olympics in the 400 m freestyle, 1500 m freestyle and the 4×200 m freestyle relay, reaching the final in the latter and coming 6th.
