= Hazzard Dill =

Bermudian sprinter

Personal information
- Nationality: Bermudian
- Born: Florentus Hazzard Willis Dill; 1 September 1918 Sandys Parish, Bermuda
- Died: 20 August 2001 (aged 82) Bermuda

Sport
- Sport: Sprinting
- Events: 200 metres, 400 metres

Florentus Hazzard Willis Dill (1 September 1918 – 20 August 2001) was a Bermudian sprinter. He competed for Bermuda in the 200 metres, 400 metres, and the men's 4 × 100 metres relay at the 1948 Summer Olympics.

== Biography ==
Florentus Hazzard Willis Dill was born on 1 September 1918 in Sandys Parish, Bermuda. During World War II, he fought as part of the First Caribbean Regiment in Italy and Egypt, under the rank of Gunner. Before his time in the regiment, Dill had trained as a runner. Determining that to run faster he needed strong legs, he trained by running with 5-pound (2.3 kg) weights strapped to each leg; this practice ended after he enlisted, where he was instructed in physical training techniques. During his time in the military, Dill competed in athletics events for War Certificates which had monetary value. In 1942, Dill set a Bermudian record of 52.0 in the 440-yard run. After the war, he went onto join the Bermuda Amateur Sports Association, an organisation that was created to support black athletes.

At the Bermuda Olympic Track and Field Trials for the 1948 Summer Olympics in London, Dill set a new Bermudian record of 53.6 seconds in the 400 metres, and he was part of the team that set a new Bermudian record of 45.8 in the 4 × 100 metres relay. On 22 June 1948, the Bermuda Olympic team was announced, which included Dill as one of the twelve athletes selected. The 1948 delegation was the first Bermudian Olympic team to include black athletes, of which Dill was one.

Dill represented Bermuda at the Olympics in the 200 metres, 400 metres, and the men's 4 × 100 metres relay. In the 200 metres, he finished fifth in his heat, in the 400 metres, he ran a time of 45.4 to finish third in his heat, and in the 4 × 100 metres relay, the Bermudian team finished fifth in their heat with a time of 45.4. He did not progress to the second round in any event.

While away at the Olympics, Hazzard became the father of a son. At the 1952 Bermuda Olympic Trials, Dill placed second in the 400 metres, and at a 1953 meet pitting Bermudan athletes against Royal Navy athletes, he won the 220 yards event.

After the Olympics, he worked for the Department of Education to look after Bermuda's playing fields.

In 1944, Dill married Mabel Louis Butterfield. He lived in Pembroke and had at least two sons, named Paul and Malcolm. In 1994, he won an award at the Bermuda House of Assembly for his sporting achievements. He died on 20 August 2001 in Bermuda.
