= Elemér Szathmáry =

Hungarian swimmer (1926–1971)

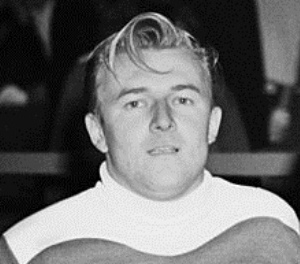
- Elemér Szathmáry in 1948

Personal information
- Born: 16 February 1926 Budapest, Hungary
- Died: 17 December 1971 (aged 45) Sydney, Australia

Sport
- Sport: Swimming
Medal record
Representing Hungary
Olympic Games
| Silver medal – second place | 1948 London | 4x200 m freestyle |
European Championships
| Bronze medal – third place | 1947 Monte Carlo | 100 m freestyle |
| Bronze medal – third place | 1947 Monte Carlo | 4×200 m freestyle |

Elemér Szathmáry (16 February 1926 – 17 December 1971) was a Hungarian swimmer and Olympic medalist, born in Budapest. He participated in the 1948 Summer Olympics in London, winning a silver medal in 4 x 200 metre freestyle relay. Szathmáry died in Sydney, Australia on 17 December 1971, at the age of 45.
