= Clarke Scholes =

American swimmer (1930–2010)

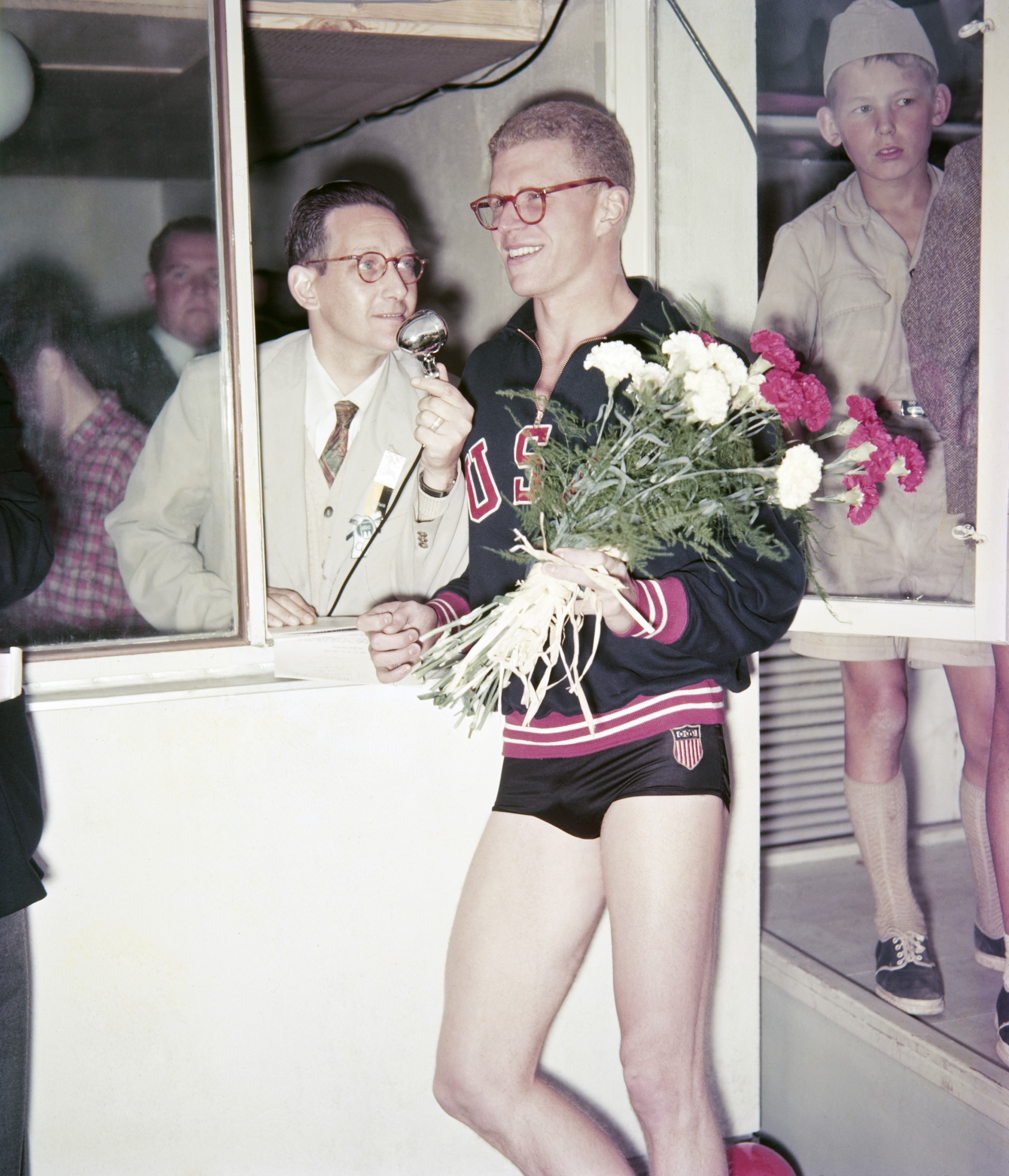
- Scholes being interviewed at the Helsinki Summer Games (1952)

Personal information
- Full name: Clarke Currie Scholes
- National team: United States
- Born: November 25, 1930 Detroit, Michigan, U.S.
- Died: February 5, 2010 (aged 79) Detroit, Michigan, U.S.
- Height: 6 ft 3 in (1.91 m)
- Weight: 174 lb (79 kg)

Sport
- Sport: Swimming
- Strokes: Freestyle
- College team: Michigan State University
- Coach: Clarence Pinkston; Charles McCaffree (MSU)
Medal record
Representing the United States
Olympic Games
Gold medal – first place	1952 Helsinki	100 m freestyle
Pan American Games
Gold medal – first place	1955 Mexico City	100 m freestyle
Gold medal – first place	1955 Mexico City	4×100 m medley
Representing Michigan State Spartans
NCAA Championships
Gold medal – first place	1950 Columbus	100 yard freestyle
Gold medal – first place	1951 Austin	50 yard freestyle
Gold medal – first place	1951 Austin	100 yard freestyle
Gold medal – first place	1951 Austin	400 yard freestyle relay
Gold medal – first place	1952 Princeton	100 yard freestyle

Clarke Currie Scholes (November 25, 1930 – February 5, 2010) was an American competition swimmer and Olympic champion.

Scholes was awarded the gold medal in the 100-meter freestyle at the 1952 Summer Olympics in Helsinki, Finland. His posted time of 57.4 seconds for the event matched that of fellow competitor Hiroshi Suzuki of Japan. Officials used a judge's decision and awarded Scholes the gold medal. He also won gold medals in the 100-meter freestyle and 4×100-meter medley relay at the 1955 Pan American Games.

In 1948, as a Redford High School senior, Scholes won Detroit City League titles in the 50- and 100-yard freestyle. He attended Michigan State University, and swam for the Michigan State Spartans swimming and diving team under Coach Charles McCaffree in National Collegiate Athletic Association (NCAA) competition. While under the direction of coach Charles McCaffree, Clarke was transformed into a five-time All-American and three-time NCAA champion in the 100-yard freestyle.

Scholes was inducted into the International Swimming Hall of Fame in 1980. He was part of the inaugural class of thirty inductees into the Michigan State University Sports Hall of Fame in 1992, and he was inducted into the Michigan Sports Hall of Fame in February 2008.

== See also ==
- List of members of the International Swimming Hall of Fame
- List of Michigan State University people
- List of Olympic medalists in swimming (men)
