= Joseph Reynders =

Belgian swimmer (1929–2024)

Personal information
- Born: 16 December 1929 Antwerp, Belgium
- Died: 12 April 2024 (aged 94) Antwerp, Belgium

Sport
- Sport: Swimming

Joseph Reynders (16 December 1929 – 12 April 2024) was a Belgian swimmer. He competed in the men's 1500 metre freestyle at the 1948 Summer Olympics and the water polo tournament at the 1952 Summer Olympics. Reynders died in Antwerp on 12 April 2024, at the age of 94.
