= John Marshall (swimmer) =

Australian swimmer (1930–1957)

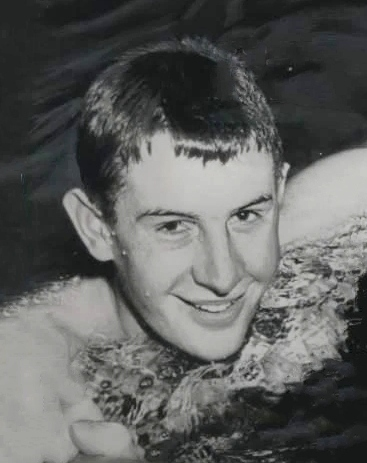
- Marshall in 1950

Personal information
- Full name: John Birnie Marshall
- National team: Australia
- Born: 29 March 1930 Bondi, New South Wales
- Died: 31 January 1957 (aged 26) Melbourne, Victoria

Sport
- Sport: Swimming
- Strokes: Freestyle, butterfly
- College team: Yale University
- Coach: Bob Kiphuth
Medal record
Representing Australia
Olympic Games
Bronze medal – third place	1948 London	400 m freestyle
Silver medal – second place	1948 London	1500 m freestyle
Representing Yale
NCAA
Gold medal – first place	1951 Austin	Team competition
Gold medal – first place	1951 Austin	220 yard freestyle
Gold medal – first place	1951 Austin	440 yard freestyle
Gold medal – first place	1951 Austin	1,500 meter freestyle

John Birnie Marshall (29 March 1930 – 31 January 1957) was an Australian competitive swimmer of the 1940s and 1950s who won a silver medal in the 1500-metre and a bronze medal in the 400-metre freestyle at the 1948 Summer Olympics. By the age of 21, he had set 28 world and 38 American records (see note below).

== Biography ==
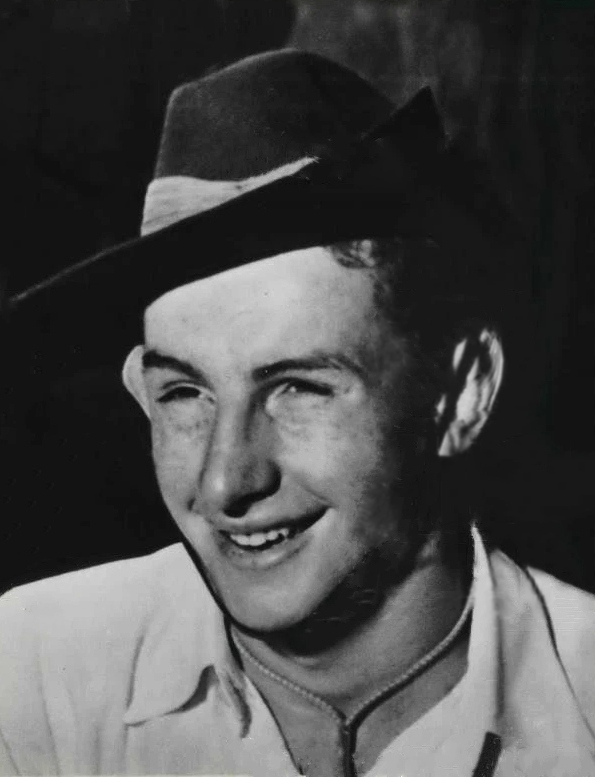
Marshall in 1951

Marshall was born in Bondi, New South Wales, the elder son of Alexander St Andrew McLean Marshall, a window dresser and former surfing champion from Western Australia. He soon moved to Perth, where he started swimming in the Swan River by the age of three, and in 1935 to Melbourne, where he was educated at Haileybury College (according to the haileybury website). As a teenager he took up cricket, association football and athletics and only later shifted to swimming.

In 1947 he won every event from the 220-yard to the 1650-yard freestyle at the 1947 Australian championships. The following year, he was selected for the London Olympics, where he claimed bronze in the men's 400-metre freestyle behind the American duo of Bill Smith and Jimmy McLane. He claimed a silver medal in the men's 1500 metre freestyle, behind McLane. In Marshall's era, the 200-metre freestyle was not part of the Olympic swimming program. McLane's coach, Bob Kiphuth was so impressed by Marshall's performance that the same year he arranged for Marshall to study at Yale University and swim for the Yale Bulldogs swimming and diving team. Under Kiphuth's guidance, Marshall set 19 world records, 15 of them within four months in 1950. At the 1949 Australian championships he won all freestyle events from 100- to 1500-metre, and at the 1950 U.S. Amateur Athletic Union (AAU) Indoor Championships he collected the 220-yard, 440-yard, 880-yard, 200-metre, 400-metre and 1-mile titles.

Marshall was burnt out by the 1952 Summer Olympics – he failed to qualify for the final of the 400-metre freestyle, and finished an eighth in the final of the 1500-metre freestyle, more than 41 seconds behind the second-last finisher. In 1954 he returned to Australia, where he worked for the tyre company of the Australian former swimmer Frank Beaurepaire. On 14 September 1955 he married Wendy Patricia Byrne, an 18-year-old competition diver.

Marshall made a third attempt at Olympic glory at the 1956 Summer Olympics in Melbourne. At the age of 26, he had given up freestyle, and placed his efforts in the newly recognised butterfly stroke. Although he reached the finals of the 200-metre butterfly, he finished fifth behind American William Yorzyk. A few weeks after the 1956 Olympics, Marshall was killed in a car accident, while three teenagers, the passengers of the car he was driving, escaped with minor injuries. In 1973 he was inducted into the International Swimming Hall of Fame and in 1985 to the Sport Australia Hall of Fame.

== See also ==
- List of members of the International Swimming Hall of Fame
- List of Olympic medalists in swimming (men)
- World record progression 200 metres freestyle
- World record progression 400 metres freestyle

== Notes ==
Before records were standardized, any swimmer could set an American record at an AAU meet. If the fastest American swimmer had a slower time than the foreign American record holder, it was referred to as the American citizen record. Foreign athletes can also be "All Americans" while competing at the collegiate level.
