= Ciril Pelhan =

Yugoslav swimmer

Personal information
- Born: 4 November 1921 Ljubljana, Kingdom of Yugoslavia
- Died: 20 May 2011 (aged 89)

Sport
- Sport: Swimming

Ciril Pelhan (4 November 1921 – 20 May 2011) was a Yugoslav swimmer. He competed in the men's 4 × 200 metre freestyle relay at the 1948 Summer Olympics.
