= Tom Holt (swimmer) =

British swimmer (1923–2004)

Personal information
- Full name: Thomas Patrick Holt
- Born: 21 October 1923 Africa
- Died: 17 August 2004 (aged 80) Queensland, Australia

Sport
- Sport: Swimming

Thomas Patrick Holt (21 October 1923 – 17 August 2004) was a British swimmer. He competed in the men's 400 metre freestyle at the 1948 Summer Olympics. His elder brother John was also part of the British swimming team at the same Games.
