= David Browning =

American diver (1931–1956)

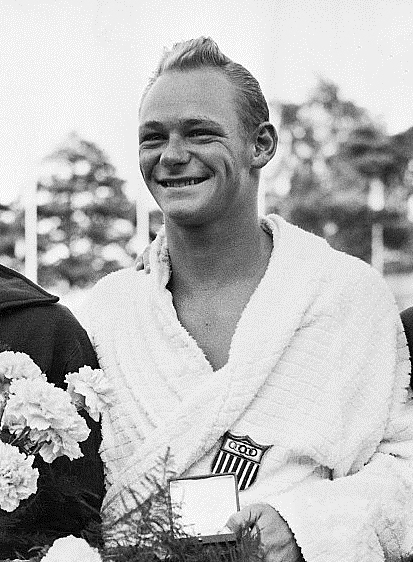
- Browning at the 1952 Olympics

Personal information
- Full name: David Greig Browning Jr.
- Nickname: Skippy
- Born: June 5, 1931 Boston, Massachusetts, U.S.
- Died: March 13, 1956 (aged 24) Near Rantoul, Kansas, U.S.
- Education: Business administration, University of Texas
- Occupation: United States Naval Aviator
- Years active: 1948–1956

Sport
- Sport: Diving
- Event: Springboard diving
- University team: University of Texas
- Club: Texas Longhorns

Achievements and titles
- Olympic finals: 1952
Medal record
Representing the United States
Olympic Games
Gold medal – first place	1952 Helsinki	Springboard
Representing Texas
NCAA
Gold medal – first place	1951 Austin	1 meter diving
Gold medal – first place	1951 Austin	3 meter diving
Gold medal – first place	1952 Princeton	1 meter diving
Gold medal – first place	1952 Princeton	3 meter diving
- Updated on 25 July 2012

David Greig "Skippy" Browning Jr. (June 5, 1931 – March 13, 1956) was a diver from the United States and Olympic champion. He represented the US at the 1952 Summer Olympics in Helsinki, where he received a gold medal in springboard diving. After his Olympic victory in Helsinki, Browning shinnied up a flag pole to steal an Olympic flag and was arrested.

Browning married Corinne L. Couch on September 7, 1950. In January 1953 he graduated from the University of Texas at Austin with a degree in business administration. In June 1955 he received his wings as a pilot in the United States Navy at Pensacola, Florida.

On March 13, 1956, he was on a training flight in a North American FJ-3 Fury jet carrier fighter when the plane crashed near Rantoul, Kansas, killing Browning. At the time, he was scheduled to be reassigned to Los Angeles to begin training for the 1956 Summer Olympics.

Browning was inducted into the International Swimming Hall of Fame in Fort Lauderdale, Florida in 1975. His father was his coach and instructor.

== See also ==
- List of members of the International Swimming Hall of Fame
