= José Durañona =

Argentine swimmer (1923–2021)

Personal information
- Nationality: Argentina
- Born: March 29, 1923 Buenos Aires, Argentina
- Died: February 5, 2021 (aged 97)

Sport
- Sport: Swimming
- Strokes: Freestyle

José María Durañona Oríe (March 29, 1923 – February 5, 2021) was an Argentine freestyle swimmer who competed at the 1948 Summer Olympics in the 400 m freestyle and 4 × 200 m freestyle relay, reaching the final in the latter and coming 6th.

In 1940, he set the South American swimming record in the 300 metres freestyle.

He was featured several times on the cover of the magazine El Gráfico.
