= John Holt (swimmer) =

British swimmer

Personal information
- Full name: John David Holt
- Born: 27 May 1922
- Died: 4 February 1966 (aged 43)

Sport
- Sport: Swimming

John David Holt (27 May 1922 – 4 February 1966) was a British swimmer. He competed in the men's 4 × 200 metre freestyle relay at the 1948 Summer Olympics. His younger brother Tom was also part of the British swimming team at the same Games.
