= Henri Padou Jr. =

French swimmer (1928–1999)

Personal information
- Born: 21 August 1928 Tourcoing, France
- Died: 16 November 1999 (aged 71) Marcq-en-Baroeul, France

Sport
- Sport: Swimming
- Club: EN Tourcoing
Medal record
Representing France
Olympic Games
Bronze medal – third place	1948 London	4×200 m freestyle

Henri Padou Jr. (21 August 1928 – 16 November 1999) was a French freestyle swimmer who competed at the 1948 Summer Olympics. He won a bronze medal in the 4 × 200 m relay and failed to reach the final of the 100 m race.

His father Henri Padou was an Olympic swimmer and water polo player.
