= Ferenc Vörös =

Hungarian swimmer (born 1922)

Personal information
- Born: 9 April 1922 Budapest, Hungary

Sport
- Sport: Swimming
- Club: Neményi Madisz
Medal record
Representing Hungary
European Championships
Silver medal – second place	1947 Monte Carlo	1500 m freestyle

Ferenc Vörös (born 9 April 1922) is a Hungarian retired swimmer who won a silver medal in the 1500 m freestyle at the 1947 European Aquatics Championships. He competed in the same event at the 1948 Summer Olympics, but did not reach the finals.
