= Adolfo Mancuso =

Argentine swimmer

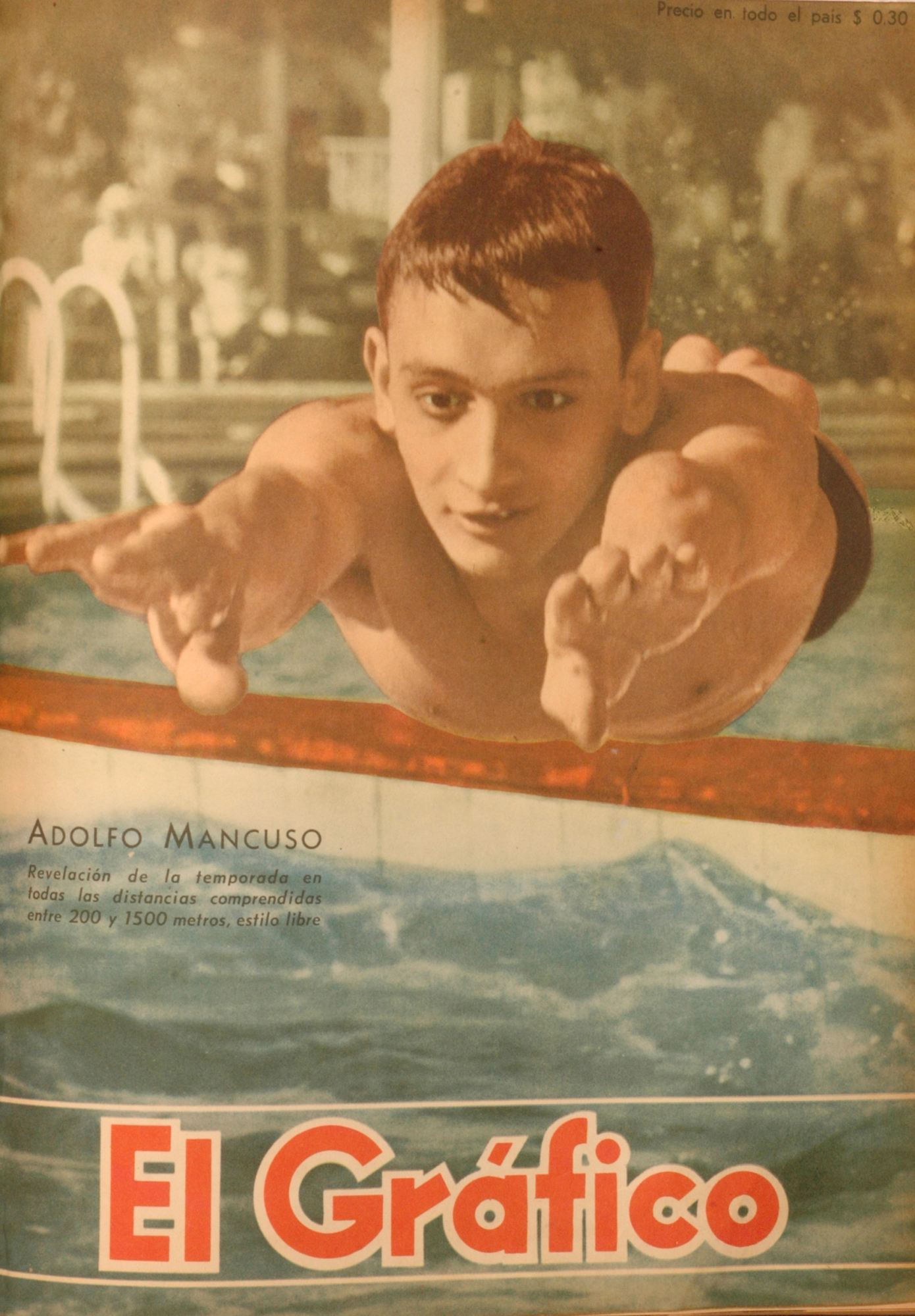

Personal information
- Full name: Adolfo Jorge Mancuso
- Nationality: Argentina
- Born: 13 June 1930 (age 96)

Sport
- Sport: Swimming
- Strokes: Freestyle

Adolfo Jorge Mancuso (born 13 June 1930) is an Argentine swimmer who competed at the 1948 Summer Olympics in the 1500 m freestyle.
