= Frank Gosling =

Bermudian diver

Personal information
- Full name: Francis Jones Gosling
- Nationality: Bermudian
- Born: 3 August 1917; Paget Parish, Bermuda
- Died: 13 February 2001 (aged 83)

Sport
- Sport: Diving

Frank Gosling (3 August 1917 – 13 February 2001) was a Bermudian diver. He competed at the 1948 Summer Olympics and the 1952 Summer Olympics.
