= Alfonso Ahumada =

Colombian fencer (1913–1992)

Personal information
- Full name: Alfonso Ahumada Ruiz
- Born: 3 February 1913 Bogotá, Colombia
- Died: 28 January 1992 (aged 78) Bogotá, Colombia

Sport
- Sport: Fencing

Alfonso Ahumada (3 February 1913 – 28 January 1992) was a Colombian fencer. He competed in the individual épée event at the 1948 Summer Olympics.
