= Imre Nyéki =

Hungarian swimmer (1928–1995)

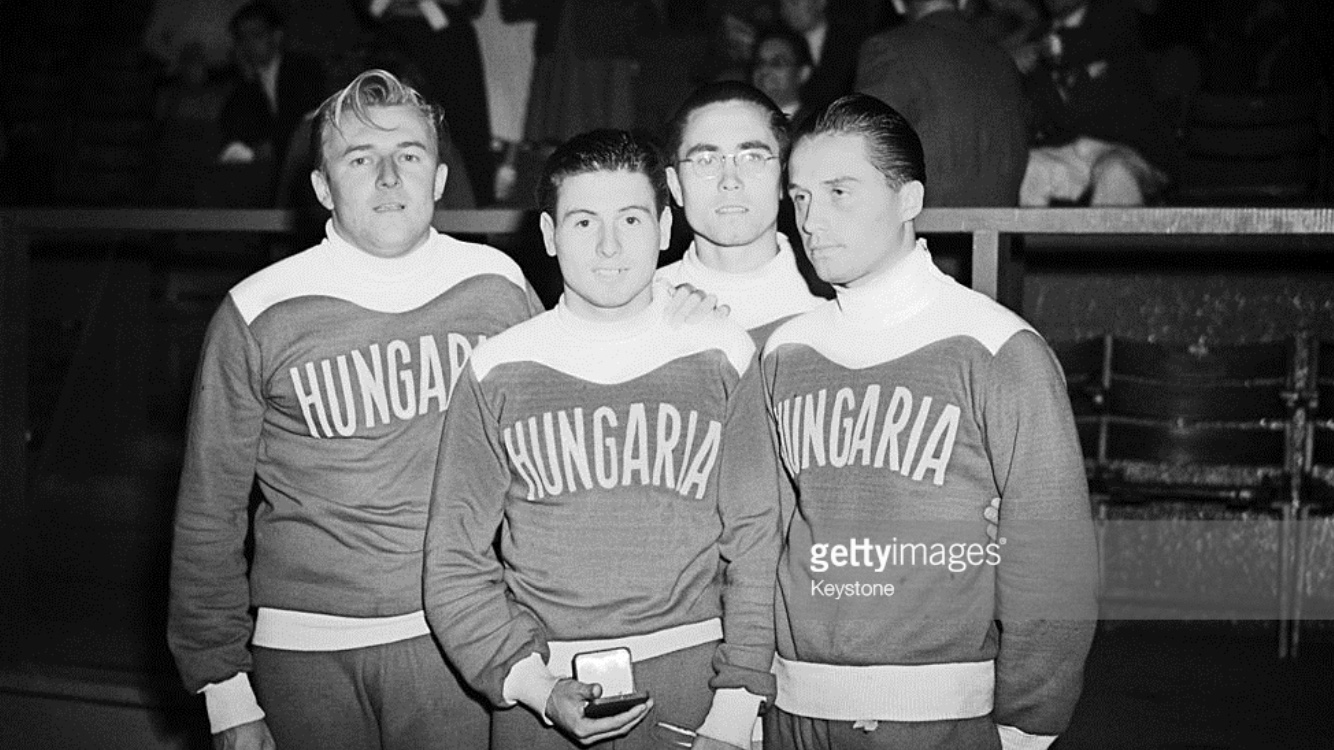
- Imre Nyeki, György Mitró, Géza Kádas, and Elemér Szatmári

Personal information
- Born: November 1, 1928
- Died: March 27, 1995 (aged 66)

Sport
- Sport: Swimming
Medal record
Representing Hungary
Olympic Games
Silver medal – second place	1948 London	4×200 m freestyle
European Championships
Gold medal – first place	1954 Turin	100 m freestyle
Gold medal – first place	1954 Turin	4×200 m freestyle
Bronze medal – third place	1947 Monte Carlo	4×200 m freestyle
Bronze medal – third place	1958 Budapest	4×200 m freestyle

Imre Nyéki (1 November 1928 – 27 March 1995) was a Hungarian swimmer and Olympic medalist. He participated at the 1948 Summer Olympics, winning a silver medal in 4 × 200 metre freestyle relay. He also competed at the 1952 Summer Olympics.
