= Sergei Javorsky =

Estonian footballer

Personal information
- Date of birth: 9 June 1902
- Place of birth: Tallinn, Governorate of Estonia, Russian Empire
- Date of death: 8 June 1993 (aged 90)
- Place of death: Tootsi, Estonia

International career
Years	Team	Apps	(Gls)
1922	Estonia	2	(0)

Sergei Javorsky (9 June 1902 – 8 June 1993) was an Estonian footballer. He played in two matches for the Estonia national football team in 1922. He also competed in the 1924 Summer Olympics.
