= György Mitró =

Hungarian swimmer

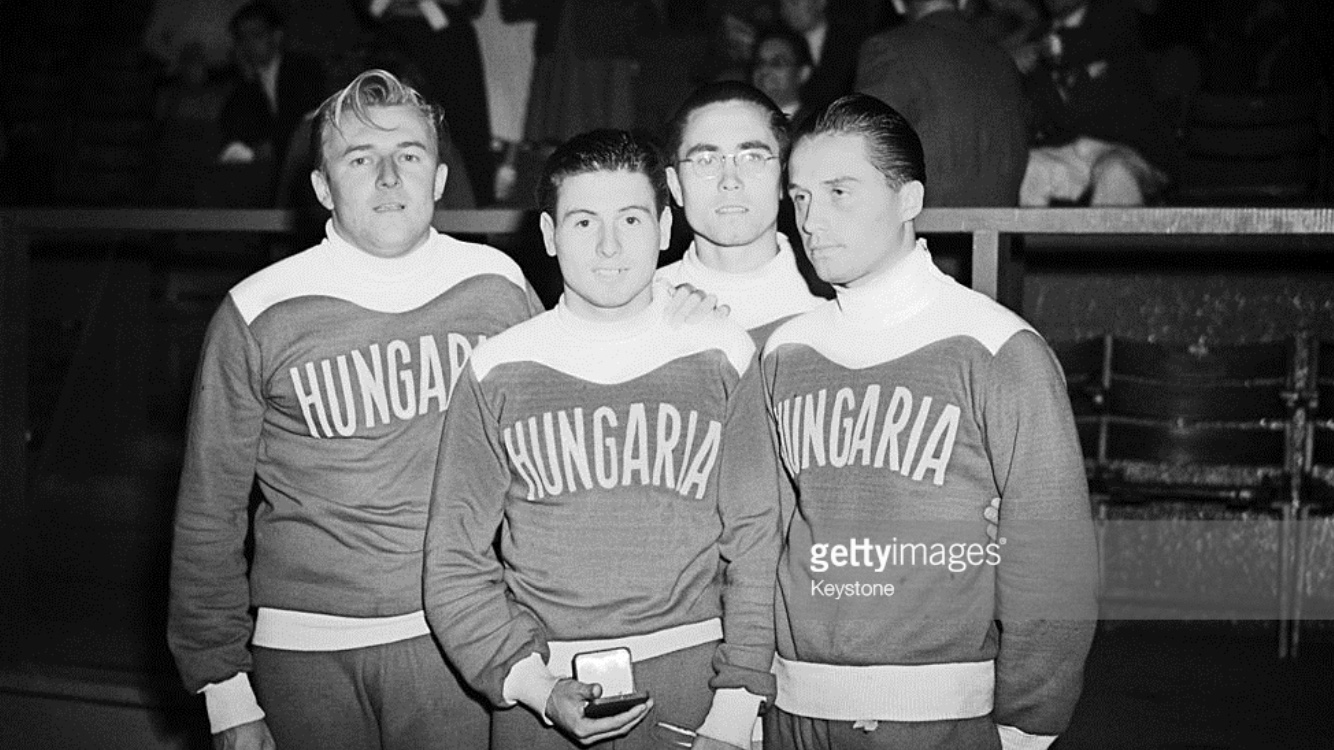

Personal information
- Born: March 6, 1930 Nyiregyháza, Hungary
- Died: January 4, 2010 (aged 79) Budapest, Hungary

Sport
- Sport: Swimming
Medal record
Representing Hungary
Olympic Games
Silver medal – second place	1948 London	4x200 m freestyle
Bronze medal – third place	1948 London	1500 m freestyle
European Championships
Gold medal – first place	1947 Monte Carlo	1500 m freestyle
Silver medal – second place	1947 Monte Carlo	400 m freestyle
Bronze medal – third place	1947 Monte Carlo	4×200 m freestyle

György Mitró (6 March 1930 – 4 January 2010) was a Hungarian swimmer and Olympic medalist. He participated at the 1948 Summer Olympics, winning a silver medal in 4 × 200 metre freestyle relay, and a bronze medal in 1500 metre freestyle. He also became a European champion in 1500 metres freestyle swimming in 1947.
