= Alfredo Yantorno =

Argentine swimmer (1924–1963)

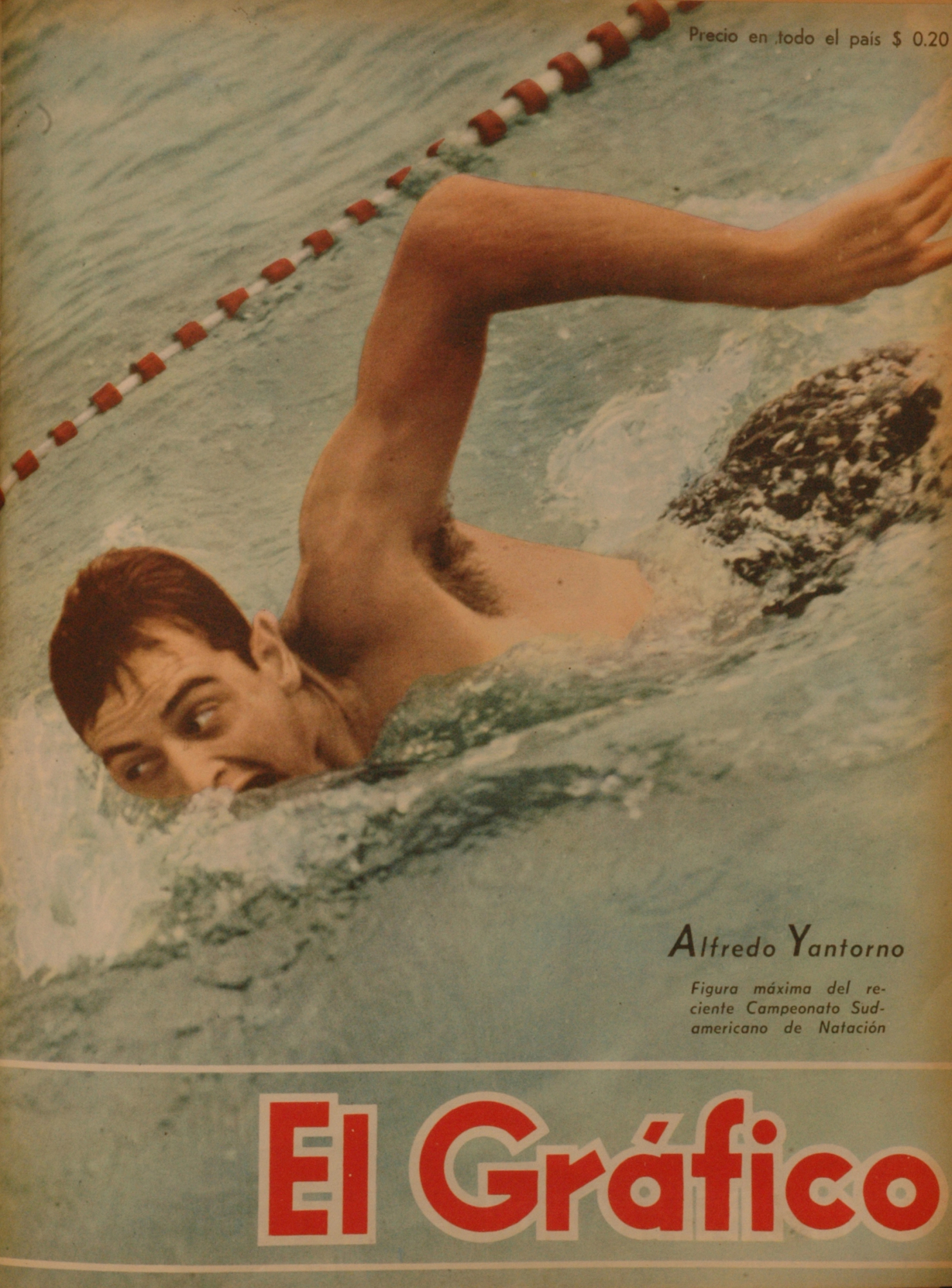

Personal information
- Nationality: Argentina
- Born: 8 June 1924
- Died: 28 July 1963 (aged 39)

Sport
- Sport: Swimming
- Strokes: Freestyle

Alfredo Yantorno (8 June 1924 – 28 July 1963) was an Argentine swimmer who competed at the 1948 Summer Olympics and the 1952 Summer Olympics. He was the flag bearer for Argentina at the 1948 Summer Olympics during the opening ceremony, where he reached the final of the 400 m freestyle finishing 8th.

Olympic Games
Preceded by Juan Carlos Zabala	Flagbearer for Argentina; London 1948	Succeeded by Delfo Cabrera
