= Jean Savy =

- Born: 4 December 1906; Sarceles, France
- Died: 17 June 1993 (aged 86)
- Military career
- Allegiance: United Kingdom, France
- Branch: Special Operations Executive; French Army
- Service years: 1943–1945
- Nickname: Savy
- Unit: Wizard

Jean Savy (4 December 1906 – 17 June 1993) was a French citizen and a commander in the French army.

== Early life ==
William Jean Savy was born in Sarcelles, Seine-et-Oise, France on 4 December 1906. He attended l'Ecole des Science Politique in Paris and read Law. After completing his studies, he practiced Law.

== Special Operations Executive ==
Savy was interviewed by Colonel Buckmaster and was recruited by the Special Operations Executive. Jean Savy was given the pseudonym Jean Millet.

=== The Wizard Network ===
The main brief by the SOE was to form an organisation for the furnishing of safe houses for the reception of teams of British officers after D-Day.

Savy worked undercover as a solicitor in Paris and rented an office from a Monsieur Gieules (aka "Marcellin"). The Gestapo was aware of this. One night in a brave act of courage, Gieules raced from his office to the Métro station where Jean Savy was about to descend and informed him that the Gestapo was waiting for him.

On the 19/20 July 1943 Savy and Antelme, both now hunted, were expatriated from France by Lysander operation near Tour (Tours?). Meanwhile, Monsieur Gieules had been arrested and deported to Mittelbau-Dora, a concentration camp.

=== Operation Mitchel ===
After the arrests of Madeleine Damerment, France Antelme and Lionel Lee in February 1944, Savy volunteered to return to France. On 2 March 1944 he arrived near Châteauroux and was received by 'Greyhound'. Savy was accompanied by Jacqueline Nearne's sister Eileen Nearne (ROSE) as his wireless operator. Savy was on a particularly dangerous mission. He was to form a large and widespread organisation, the establishment and arrangement for the reception and utilisation of uniformed teams to be sent into France by parachute on and after D-Day.

Savy was a prominent figure in French legal circles and very well known, in addition he suffered from a badly disfigured arm, which rendered him conspicuous. In spite of this and with the knowledge that he was posted as wanted by the Gestapo, he displayed a complete disregard of personal danger and traveled extensively in order to visit a large number of contacts and leaders - themselves marked men - in order to make sure of the sound foundation of his plans.

Antelme's arrest disrupted his plans for pursuing supply and financial contacts; seeking to make himself useful, he stumbled accidentally on a piece of intelligence so important that he left Paris, Miss Nearne and a second operator Jean Gernard Maury (Arnaud) and returned to England. (The two operators attached themselves to 'Spiritualist'). Savy's information was about a large secret ammunition dump in stone quarries at Saint Leu d'Esserent. He had discovered precise details of its site and, more important of its content: 2000 V1 rockets, ready to fire.

== Awards ==
Savy was appointed as a member of The Most Excellent Order of the British Empire and awarded the Chevalier de la Légion d'honneur, the Croix de Guerre, and the Médaille de la Résistance by the French government.

== Sources ==
- SOE French Section
- http://perso.orange.fr/redtarget
- They Landed by Moonlight by Hugh Verity
