= Lance East =

British modern pentathlete

Personal information
- Born: 22 May 1901 Madras, India
- Died: 23 June 1993 (aged 92) Surrey, England

Sport
- Sport: Modern pentathlon

Lance East (22 May 1901 – 23 June 1993) was a British modern pentathlete. He competed at the 1928 Summer Olympics.
