= 1950 NCAA swimming and diving championships =

American college aquatic sports competition

- Host city: Columbus, Ohio
- Date(s): March 1950
- Venue(s): Ohio State Natatorium; Ohio State University
- Teams: 20
- Events: 14

The 1950 NCAA swimming and diving championships were contested in March 1950 at the Ohio State Natatorium at the Ohio State University in Columbus, Ohio at the 14th annual NCAA-sanctioned swim meet to determine the team and individual national champions of men's collegiate swimming and diving among its member programs in the United States.

Hosts Ohio State repeated as team champions, capturing their sixth overall title and fifth title in six years.

== Program changes ==
- Two new events were added to the NCAA championship program: the 100-yard backstroke and the 100-yard butterfly.

== Team standings ==
- (H) = Hosts
- (DC) = Defending champions
- Italics = Debut appearance

Rank	Team	Points
1st place, gold medalist(s)	Ohio State (H, DC)	64
2nd place, silver medalist(s)	Yale	43
3rd place, bronze medalist(s)	Iowa	25
4	Michigan	24
5	Michigan State	17
6	Stanford	15
7	Princeton	13
8	Texas	11
9	La Salle	10
10	Northwestern	9
11	Purdue	8
12	Miami (FL)	4
13	Army	2
13	Colgate	2
13	Indiana	2
13	USC	2
13	Washington State	2
13	Wisconsin	2
19	Georgia	1
19	SMU	1

== Individual events ==
=== Swimming ===
Event	Champion	Team	Time
50-yard freestyle	Edward Garst	Iowa	23.4
100-yard freestyle	Clark Scholes	Michigan State	50.9
220-yard freestyle	John Blum	Yale	2:10.0
440-yard freestyle	Ralph Sala	Stanford	4:43.1
1,500-meter freestyle	Jack Taylor	Ohio State	18:38.3
100-yard backstroke	Bill Sonner	Ohio State	59.1
150-yard backstroke	Jack Taylor	Ohio State	1:32.1
100-yard butterfly	Bob Brawner	Princeton	59.9
200-yard butterfly	Bob Brawner	Princeton	2:14.3
150-yard individual medley	Joe Verdeur (DC)	La Salle	1:31.2
400-yard freestyle relay	Bill Farnsworth; Larry Munson; John Blum; Ray Reid	Yale (DH)	3:27.9
300-yard medley relay	Al Ratkiewich; Bob Essert; Ray Reid	Yale	2:51.2

=== Diving ===
Event	Champion	Team	Score
One-meter diving	Bruce Harlan (DC)	Ohio State	145.00
Three-meter diving	Bruce Harlan (DC)	Ohio State	153.65

== See also ==
- List of college swimming and diving teams
