= Henri Padou =

French swimmer (1898–1981)

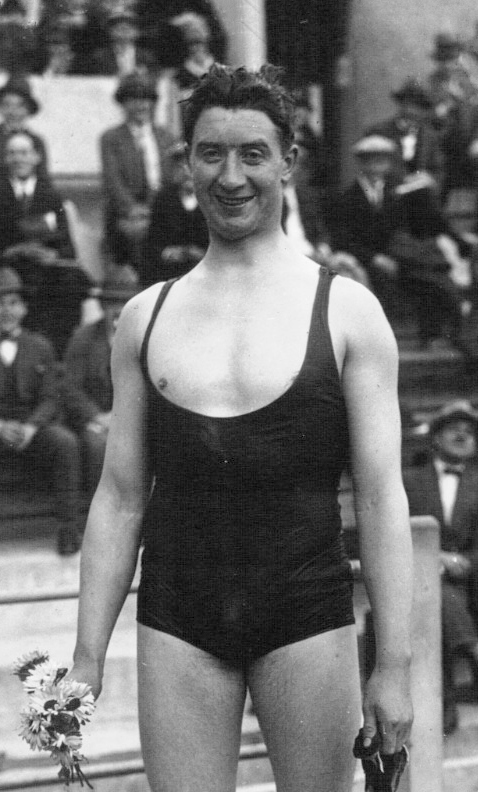
- Henri Padou in 1927

Personal information
- Born: 15 May 1898 Tourcoing, France
- Died: 19 November 1981 (aged 83) Wasquehal, France

Sport
- Sport: Swimming
- Club: EN Tourcoing
Medal record
Water polo
Representing France
Olympic Games
| Gold medal – first place | 1924 Paris | Team competition |
| Bronze medal – third place | 1928 Amsterdam | Team competition |

Henri Padou (15 May 1898 – 19 November 1981) was a French water polo player and freestyle swimmer. He competed in water polo at the 1920, 1924, 1928 and 1936 Summer Olympics and finished in 9th, 1st, 3rd and 4th place, respectively. In 1920 and 1924, he also participated in the 100 m and 4 × 200 m swimming events but failed to reach the finals. In 1970 he was inducted into the International Swimming Hall of Fame in the category water polo.

His son Henri Padou Jr. was an Olympic swimmer.

== See also ==
- France men's Olympic water polo team records and statistics
- List of Olympic champions in men's water polo
- List of Olympic medalists in water polo (men)
- List of players who have appeared in multiple men's Olympic water polo tournaments
- List of members of the International Swimming Hall of Fame
