= György Csordás =

Hungarian swimmer

Personal information
- Full name: György Csordás
- Nationality: Hungary
- Born: 6 October 1928 Cegléd, Hungary
- Died: 9 May 2000 (aged 71) Budapest, Hungary

Sport
- Sport: Swimming
- Strokes: freestyle
- Club: Újpesti TE
Medal record
European Championships (LC)
Gold medal – first place	1954 Turin	400 m freestyle
Gold medal – first place	1954 Turin	1500 m freestyle

György Csordás (6 October 1928 – 9 May 2000) was a freestyle swimmer from Hungary, who competed in three consecutive Summer Olympics for his native country, starting in 1948.

His best individual result came in 1948, when he placed fourth in the 1500 m freestyle event.

At the European Championships in 1954 he became European champion in the 400 m and 1500 m freestyle events.
