= Forbes Norris =

American swimmer

Dr. Forbes Norris Jr.
Personal information
- Full name: Dr. Forbes Holten Norris Jr.
- Nickname: "Teddy"
- National team: United States
- Born: May 1, 1928 Richmond, Virginia, U.S.
- Died: June 18, 1993 (aged 65) Mill Valley, California, U.S.
- Education: Harvard University (1949); Harvard Medical School (1955)
- Occupations: Neurologist, ALS Researcher; Assoc. Professor (U. Rochester); Founder/Director, ALS Foundation
- Spouse: Delores Holden Norris (Second wife)
- Children: 2 sons

Sport
- Sport: Swimming
- Strokes: Freestyle
- College team: Harvard University
- Coach: Hal Ulen (Harvard)

Dr. Forbes "Teddy" Holten Norris Jr. (May 1, 1928 – June 18, 1993) was an American competition swimmer who competed for Harvard University and represented the United States at the 1948 Summer Olympics in London where he placed sixth in his specialty the 1500-meter freestyle. After graduating Havard Medical School in 1955, he became a neurologist, taking an early interest into researching Amyotrophic lateral sclerosis (ALS) also known as Lou Gherig's Disease. From 1961-1966, he worked as an Associate Professor, eventually chairing the Department of Neurology, and performing research at the University of Rochester Medical School. After moving to San Francisco in 1966, he performed more focused medical research into ALS, was the Director of the California Pacific Medical Center Clinic that treated ALS patients, now known as the Forbes Norris Treatment Center, and was a founder and a research director for the ALS Foundation.

== Early life and family ==
Forbes H. Norris Jr., known as "Ted" was born May 1, 1928 one of two siblings, in Richmond, Virginia to Dr. Forbes H. Norris Senior, an Educator who served as the Assistant Superintendent of Richmond Schools from 1933-45, and Veda Mae Vose Norris, a homemaker and former teacher active in the Richmond Parent Teacher Association. An athletic family, Forbes H. Norris Senior excelled in basketball at Indiana's Manchester College, competed in track and baseball, and later enjoyed golf and tennis. Forbes Jr.'s , younger sister Marjorie would later excel as a tennis player at Rollins College in Winter Park, Florida where Forbes Norris Senior would retire. At the age of seven, Forbes Jr. fell thirty feet from the scaffold of a chimney, injuring the heel of his left leg, requiring a year on crutches. His year on crutches for his left leg left him with a dislocated hip for favoring his opposite leg, which once relocated, left Forbes Jr. on crutches and braces for another two years for his right leg. Never fully recovering, Norris walked with a limp the remainder of his life with one leg shorter than the other.

Forbes Norris Junior attended Richmond's Thomas Jefferson High School, where he graduated on June 11, 1945. Limited in his ability to excel in sports, he managed the football, baseball, and basketball teams and as an accomplished student was a member of the school's National Honor Society. Forbes Jr., known as "Teddy" played tennis at the Hermitage Club in Richmond, and trained in swimming primarily on his own, working as a lifeguard at coastal Virginia's Westmoreland Park. In 1943, he completed an application for Eagle Scout. In 1946, his family moved from Richmond to New England where Forbes Norris Senior became Winchester Massachusetts's School Superintendent, having graduated that year from Harvard with a PHd. in Education. After his Superintendent position in Massachusetts, in the 1950's Forbes Norris Sr. served as a School Superintendent in Montgomery County, Maryland.

== Swimming highlights ==
Forbes was the long distance Outdoor AAU champion in 1947 while at Harvard. Representing Harvard at the March, 1948 National AAU Indoor Swimming Championship in New Haven, Connecticut, Norris Jr. swam a 20:46 for the 1500 meter freestyle event, placing fifth nationally. Representing Harvard at the National AAU Outdoor Swimming Championships in September, 1948 at the Waterworks Pool in Cuyahoga Falls in Ohio, Norris placed third in the 1500-meter freestyle.

At the July, 1948 Olympic trials at the Rouge Park Pools in Detroit, Norris placed second in the 1500-meter freestyle with a time of 20:04.0, qualifying him for the London Olympics. He did not qualify in the 400 freestyle, though he also swam the event in the trials.

== 1948 London Olympics ==
Managed by Head U.S. Olympic Coach Robert J. H. Kiphuth at the 1948 London Olympics, Norris competed in the men's 1,500-meter freestyle, and finished sixth in the event final with a time of 20:18.8, less than 45 seconds from contending for the bronze medal. Norris's rival at the 1948 trials, American Jimmy McClane won gold in the event with a time of 19:18.5, John Marshall of Australia won the Silver medal with a time of 19:31.5, and Gyorgi Mitro of Hungary took the bronze medal with a time of 19:43.2.

=== Harvard University ===
Enrolling around 1945 and graduating in 1949, he attended Harvard University where despite his childhood hip injury, he swam for Coach Hal Ulen and excelled as the school's top distance swimmer for four years, breaking several school records during his tenure with the team. After taking a compulsory swimming course, Norris decided to swim for the Harvard varsity team. He received three consecutive varsity letters in swimming at Harvard from 1946-1949. His Harvard team mates noted his strong finish in distance events, and observed he had a strong kick and arm stroke. Coach Ulen, who swam for the University of Cincinnati, coached Harvard swimming from around 1930-1959, having previously coached Syracuse University for seven years.

=== Harvard Medical School and early career ===
In 1955, Norris graduated Harvard Medical School. After his first year at Harvard Medical, Nooris swam professionally in August, 1952 at the 10-mile Ontario Swimming Championship. Completing the race in second place, he won $2,250, and won an additional $200 for winning four laps, bringing his earnings to $2,450, which helped him pay tuition at Harvard Medical. He finished the race in fifth place in 1951.

In the 1950's he began his study into the causes of ALS and its symptoms at Harvard Medical School. ALS would later become the primary research interest of his life.

He joined the staff of the University of Rochester School of Medicine in 1961, and in May, 1963 became acting chair of the Neurology Department at Rochester Medical School. As part of his research while at University of Rochester in 1962, using a microscopic electrode, Norris discovered irregular voltage patterns as part of the electrical properties of muscle cells in myotonia patients. Myotonia usually causes involuntary muscle spasms and muscle degeneration and occurs in patients of Myotonia dystrophica, which affects around a quarter of the victims of muscular dystrophy. In December, 1964, Norris received a grant from the Muscular Dystrophy Association to further his research.

== ALS Foundation and treatment center ==
In 1966, he moved from New England to San Francisco. In August of 1966, Norris joined the Institute of Medical Sciences Staff at the Presbyterian Medical Center in San Francisco, where he undertook a three year research project which included research on the relationship between slow viruses and ALS. In his later career, he was a founder of the ALS foundation and a Vice-President of research for the organization that had offices and a clinic at the California Pacific Medical Center. After his death, plans were made to merge the foundation with the medical center, to be named the Forbes Norris ALS research center in his honor. During his life, he published five books on the topic of ALS.

=== Marriage to Delores Holden ===
After 1966, in a second marriage, Norris married wife Delores Holden, a co-founder of Norris's ALS Research Foundation , and a co-director of the California Pacific Medical Center's Forbes Norris Research and Treatment Center. She had earned a nursing degree from UT Austin, and met Norris while working at the intensive care unit of what is now known as the Forbes Norris Treatment Center. For over 40 years, Delores was a Director in an advisory role to the Forbes Norris Research and Treatment Center. In his later years, Norris harbored hopes that a treatment that might slow or possibly reverse ALS would emerge from discoveries in genetics and molecular biology.

He died at the age of 65 on the morning of June 18, 1993 of colon cancer at his home in Mill Valley, California. He was survived by two sons from his first marriage, and Delores Holden Norris, his wife from his second marriage.

=== Honors ===
In 1994, he became a member of the Harvard Varsity Club Hall of Fame for his athletic achievements as a swimmer at Harvard. The Forbes Norris Award was established in 1994 to honor the work he did to help patients of the nerve disease ALS/MND. The annual award is presented to honor a person who has most contributed to advancing medical knowledge of ALS/MND, and benefited those living with the disease.

== See also ==
- List of Harvard University people
