= Stanley Lines =

Bermudian sprinter (1918–1975)

Personal information
- Nationality: Bermudian
- Born: 13 February 1918
- Died: 10 February 1975 (aged 56)

Sport
- Sport: Sprinting
- Event: 100 metres

Stanley Campbell Lines (13 February 1918 – 10 February 1975) was a Bermudian sprinter. He competed in the men's 100 metres at the 1948 Summer Olympics.
