= Frank Mahoney (athlete) =

Bermudian sprinter (born 1929)

Personal information
- Nationality: Bermudian
- Born: Francis Xavier Mahoney; 1929

Sport
- Sport: Sprinting
- Event: 100 metres

Francis Xavier Mahoney (born 1929) is a Bermudian sprinter. He competed in the men's 100 metres at the 1948 Summer Olympics.
