= Edwin Gilbert (swimmer) =

American swimmer (1929–2020)

Personal information
- Full name: Edwin Fisher Gilbert
- National team: United States
- Born: June 22, 1929 Beaumont, Texas, U.S.
- Died: November 7, 2020 (aged 91)

Sport
- Sport: Swimming
- Strokes: Freestyle
- College team: University of Texas

Edwin Fisher Gilbert (June 22, 1929 – November 7, 2020) was an American competition swimmer who represented the United States at the 1948 Summer Olympics in London. He competed for the gold medal-winning U.S. team in the qualifying heats of the men's 4×200-meter freestyle relay. Gilbert did not receive a medal under the Olympic swimming rules in effect in 1948; only relay swimmers who competed in the event final were medal-eligible.

== See also ==
- List of University of Texas at Austin alumni
