= Lina Galli =

Italian writer

- Born: 10 February 1899; Poreč, Austria-Hungary
- Died: 23 June 1993 (aged 94); Trieste, Italy
- Occupation: Writer

Lina Galli (10 February 1899 – 23 June 1993) was an Italian writer. Her work was part of the literature event in the art competition at the 1936 Summer Olympics.

== Biography ==
Born in Poreč, then part of the Austria-Hungary, after the annexation of Istria to Italy, she lived in her hometown until 1931; having obtained her master's degree in Koper, she moved to Trieste, where she taught elementary school.

In 1936, she participated in the art competitions of the Summer Olympics. In Trieste, she frequented the Circolo della Cultura e delle Arti as well as the city's cultural cafes, and in time she forged friendships with Marcello Fraulini, Virgilio Giotti, Umberto Saba, Italo Svevo, Pier Antonio Quarantotti Gambini, Marcello Mascherini, Dyalma Stultus and Pedra Zandegiacomo, to name the most important.

In 1950, she was responsible for writing a biography of Italo Svevo together with his widow, Livia Veneziani, which was later translated into German and English.

Shortly before her death, she received the Tagliacozzo Prize. She wrote for Difesa Adriatica, Pagine Istriane, La Voce Giuliana, La Porta Orientale and Il Piccolo.

She adopted a hermetic style in his intimist poetics and dealt with themes such as the anguish of living, World War II, and the Istrian–Dalmatian exodus.
