= Erwin Glock =

German sports shooter

Personal information
- Born: 9 April 1925 Heidelberg, Germany
- Died: 29 June 1993 (aged 68) Heidelberg, Germany

Sport
- Sport: Sports shooting

Erwin Glock (9 April 1925 – 29 June 1993) was a German sports shooter. He competed at the 1972 Summer Olympics and the 1976 Summer Olympics for West Germany. Glock won 34 West German national titles during his career. He also worked as a sports teacher, and authored books on shooting and developed a training target for shooting.
