= Joe Lyons (footballer) =

Australian rules footballer, born 1914

Personal information
- Full name: John Joseph Lyons
- Born: 21 March 1914; Carlton, Victoria
- Died: 16 June 1993 (aged 79); Preston, Victoria
- Original team: Carlton Reserves / Mines Rovers

Playing career^{1}
Years	Club	Games (Goals)
1938	Hawthorn	1 (0)
- ^{1} Playing statistics correct to the end of 1938.

John Joseph Lyons (21 March 1914 – 16 June 1993) was an Australian rules footballer who played with Hawthorn in the Victorian Football League (VFL).
