= Adolfo Winternitz =

Peruvian artist

Adolfo Cristobal Winternitz, birth name: Adolf Gustav Winternitz(-)Wurmser (20 October 1906 – 17 June 1993), was a Peruvian artist of Austrian origin, with Jewish roots and belonging to a Lutheran family. He and his family converted to Catholicism. His children are Clara, Elena, Andrés and Isabel Winternitz de Riess.

== Biography ==
He was born in Vienna. Adolfo Winternitz was enrolled at the age of 15 in the Academy of Arts in Vienna. From 1921 to 1929 he studied painting, sculpture and graphics with professor Karl Sterrer. After his marriage with Hannah Pollak (1905–1986), he moved to Italy, first to Florence and then to Rome. In 1938 he and his family converted to Catholicism. With clerical support he managed to escape from fascism and emigrated to Lima, Peru in 1939. Already in 1940 he founded the art school 'Academia de Arte Católico' he led by himself. In 1942 he acquired the Peruvian citizenship. In 1947 the Academia de Arte Católico was integrated into the Pontifical Catholic University of Peru (PUCP). In 1952 Winternitz was appointed Director of the 'Escuela de Artes Plásticas' at the PUCP. In 1981 the former Academia de Arte Católico was converted into a Faculty of Arts. From 1984 he has been Dean of the Faculty. Winternitz was a founder member of SIAC (International Society of Christian Artists), established in 1950. He died in Lima.

== Decorations and awards ==
- 1966 Austrian Cross of Honour for Science and Art, 1st class
- 1979 UNESCO award
- 1989 Award by the Peruvian Ministry of Education
