= Marijan Stipetić =

Croatian swimmer (1930–2011)

Personal information
- Born: 8 December 1930
- Died: 8 April 2011 (aged 80) Markham, Ontario, Canada
Medal record
Men's swimming
Representing Yugoslavia
European Championships
Bronze medal – third place	1947 Monte Carlo	1500 m freestyle
Bronze medal – third place	1950 Vienna	4×200 m freestyle

Marijan Stipetić (also Mariyan or Marjan as well as the nickname Bibi; 8 December 1930 – 8 April 2011) was a Croatian swimmer who won two bronze medals at the European Championships of 1947 and 1950 for SFR Yugoslavia. He competed in the 4×200 m freestyle relay at the 1948 Summer Olympics and finished fifth with the Yugoslav team.

He was also a successful water polo player and won the Italian Championship of 1951 with the Canottieri Napoli club. In 1951, he moved to Canada after defecting from the former Yugoslavia. Once he arrived in Canada he competed in swimming and water polo for the university of Toronto and went on to be the head coach of the Arvida swimming club "Les Ouananiches" for 17 years(1968-1985). In 1985 the family moved to Markham, Ontario, where he swam in the masters category for the Markham Masters Swimming Club. In particular, he set national records in the 400 m, 800 m and 1500 m freestyle in the age groups 70–74 and 80–84. Stipetić held the honorary position of an Ambassador for the Croatian Olympic Committee. He died of leukemia leaving a wife, brother and four children.

His brother, Mislav, swam with Marijan in the same 4×200 m freestyle team that won the bronze medal at the 1950 European Aquatics Championships.
