= Vanja Ilić (swimmer) =

Yugoslav swimmer (1927–2018)

Personal information
- Full name: Vanja Ilić
- Born: 10 February 1927 Fiume, Kingdom of Italy
- Died: 10 November 2018 (aged 91) New York City, New York, U.S.

Sport
- Sport: Swimming

Vanja Ilić (10 February 1927 – 10 November 2018) was a Yugoslav swimmer. He competed in two events at the 1948 Summer Olympics. He was a member of swimming club Jadran Split. With the death of Željko Čajkovski on 11 November 2016, he became the oldest Croatian Olympic participant.
