= Perry Johnson (sprinter) =

Bermudian sprinter

Personal information
- Nationality: Bermudian
- Born: 1924 Somerset, Bermuda
- Died: 23 May 1999 (aged 74–75) Smith's Parish, Bermuda

Sport
- Sport: Sprinting
- Event: 100 metres

Perry Oliver Johnson III (1924 – 23 May 1999) was a Bermudian sprinter. He competed in the men's 100 metres at the 1948 Summer Olympics.
