= Ajnala, Pakistan =

Ajnala اجنالہ
- Village, town and union council
- Location within Pakistan Location within Punjab, Pakistan
- Coordinates: 32°48′N 74°15′E
- Country: Pakistan
- Province: Punjab
- District: Gujrat
- Tehsil: Gujrat
- Time zone: UTC+5 (PST)

Ajnala is a village and union council of Gujrat District, in the Punjab province of Pakistan. It is located at 32°48'0N 74°15'0E with an altitude of 277 metres.

Ajnala is a famous historical village of Gujrat, village of the Nawabs of Gujrat and many renowned personalities who had played a vital role in the partition of India and the creation of Pakistan.
