= Branko Vidović =

Croatian swimmer (1923–2013)

Personal information
- Born: 4 September 1923 Križevci
- Died: 5 October 2013 (aged 90) Samobor
Medal record
Men's swimming
Representing Yugoslavia
European Championships
Bronze medal – third place	1950 Vienna	4×200 m freestyle

Branko Vidović (4 September 1923 – 5 October 2013) was a Croatian swimmer who won a bronze medal in the 4×200 m freestyle relay at the 1950 European Aquatics Championships. He finished fifth in the same event at the 1948 Summer Olympics.
