= Don Johnston (swimmer) =

South African swimmer (1929–2018)

Personal information
- Born: 30 October 1929 Cape Town, South Africa
- Died: 22 December 2018 (aged 89)

Sport
- Sport: Swimming

Don Johnston (30 October 1929 – 22 December 2018) was a South African swimmer. He competed in two events at the 1948 Summer Olympics.
