= Miroslav Bartůšek =

Czech swimmer (1921–1985)

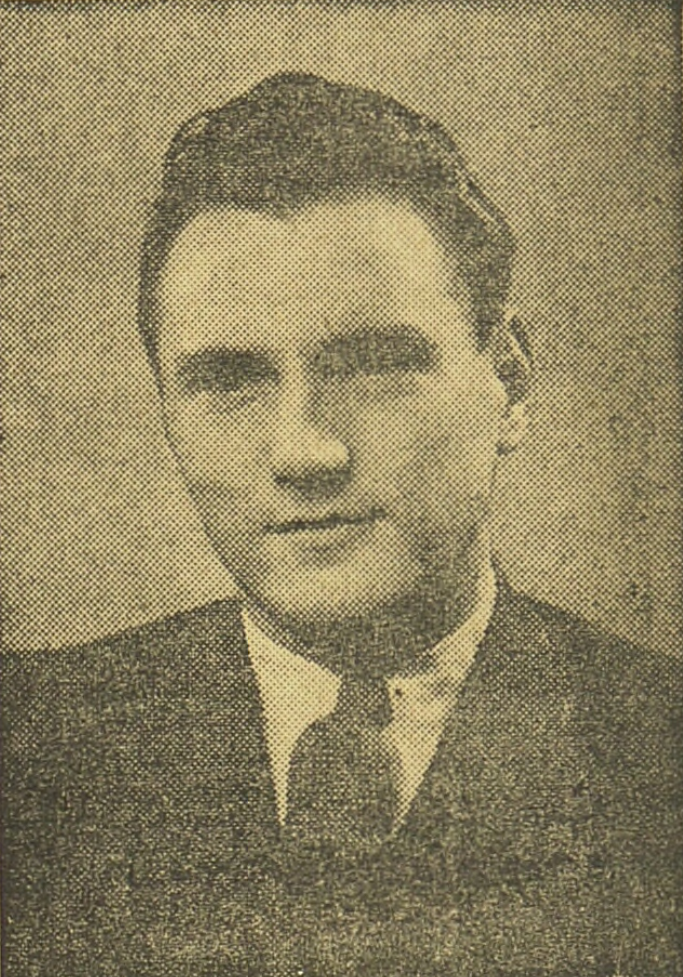
- Bartůšek in 1947

Personal information
- Born: 11 August 1921 Prague, Czechoslovakia
- Died: 18 December 1985 (aged 64)

Sport
- Sport: Swimming
Medal record
Men's swimming
Representing Czechoslovakia
European Championships (LC)
Bronze medal – third place	1947 Monte Carlo	400 m freestyle

Miroslav Bartůšek (11 August 1921 – 18 December 1985) was a Czech swimmer. He competed in two events at the 1948 Summer Olympics. He died on 18 December 1985, at the age of 64.
