= Anwar Aziz Chaudhry =

Pakistani politician and swimmer (1930–2020)

Personal information
- Nationality: Pakistani
- Born: 6 November 1930 Ajnala, Punjab, British India
- Died: 22 November 2020 (aged 90) Lahore, Punjab Pakistan
- Children: Daniyal Aziz (son)

Sport
- Sport: Swimming

Anwar Aziz Chaudhry (6 November 1930 – 22 November 2020) was a Pakistani politician and swimmer. He competed in three events at the 1948 Summer Olympics. He was a member of the National Assembly and federal minister. He was the Interior Minister of Punjab. His son is the Pakistani politician Daniyal Aziz. In 1990, he served as the Federal Minister of Railways & Law. He also served as the Federal Minister of Defense.

== Early life ==
Anwar Aziz was born 6 November 1930 into an influential Punjabi family of Muslim Gujjars in the village of Ajnala in the Gujrat Tehsil of Gujrat District in British Punjab.

== Death ==
Chaudhry died on 22 November 2020, at the age of 90.
