= Florbel Pérez =

Uruguayan swimmer

Personal information
- Full name: Florbel Héctor Pérez Martínez
- Born: 7 June 1928 Montevideo, Uruguay

Sport
- Sport: Swimming

Florbel Pérez (born 7 June 1928) is a Uruguayan former swimmer. He competed in two events at the 1948 Summer Olympics.
