= Donald Shanks (swimmer) =

Bermudian swimmer (1922–1978)

Personal information
- Full name: Donald Joseph Shanks
- Born: 3 October 1922 New York City, U.S.
- Died: 4 October 1978 (aged 56) Smith's Parish, Bermuda

Sport
- Sport: Swimming

Donald Joseph Shanks (3 October 1922 – 4 October 1978) was a Bermudian swimmer. He competed in the men's 100 metre backstroke at the 1948 Summer Olympics.

== Personal life ==
Shanks served in the Bermuda Volunteer Engineers and the Royal Air Force as a wireless operator during the Second World War. He was awarded the Defence Medal for his service. Shanks died of cancer in 1978.
