= Philip Tribley =

Bermudian swimmer (1929–c. 1990s

Personal information
- Full name: Philip Hadley Tribley
- Nationality: Bermudan
- Born: 15 July 1929 Bermuda
- Died: c. 1990s

Sport
- Sport: Swimming
- Strokes: Freestyle

Philip Hadley Tribley (15 July 1929 – c. 1990s) was a Bermudian swimmer. He competed in two events at the 1948 Summer Olympics. Tribley participated in two events: the men's 100-meter freestyle and the 4x200-meter freestyle relay.
