= Luis González (swimmer) =

Colombian swimmer (1925–2019)

Personal information
- Full name: Luis González
- Nationality: Colombian
- Born: 21 October 1925
- Died: 24 July 2019 (aged 93) Cali, Colombia

Sport
- Sport: Swimming
Medal record
Representing Colombia
Central American and Caribbean Games
Gold medal – first place	1946 Barranquilla	400m freestyle
Gold medal – first place	1946 Barranquilla	1500m freestyle

Luis Eduardo González (21 October 1925 – 24 July 2019) was a Colombian swimmer. He competed in two events at the 1948 Summer Olympics.
