= Walter Bardgett =

Bermudian swimmer (1932–2020)

Personal information
- Born: 25 September 1932 Paget Parish, Bermuda
- Died: 19 October 2020 (aged 88) Bermuda

Sport
- Sport: Swimming

Walter Edward Bardgett (25 September 1932 – 19 October 2020) was a Bermudian swimmer. He competed at the 1948 Summer Olympics and the 1952 Summer Olympics.

Bardgett suffered from stomach pains during the opening ceremony of the 1952 Olympics. The pains were attributed to the hot climate in the stadium at the time.
