= Luis Child =

Colombian swimmer (c. 1930–1992)

Personal information
- Full name: Luis Child
- Born: c. 1930 Bogotá, Colombia
- Died: 17 December 1992 Bogotá, Colombia

Sport
- Sport: Swimming

Luis Child (c. 1930 – 17 December 1992) was a Colombian swimmer. He competed in two events at the 1948 Summer Olympics.
