= Robert Cook (swimmer) =

Bermudian swimmer (born 1932)

Personal information
- Full name: Robert James Cook
- Born: 11 October 1932

Sport
- Sport: Swimming

Robert James Cook (born 11 October 1932) is a Bermudian former swimmer. He competed at the 1948 Summer Olympics and the 1952 Summer Olympics.
