= Derek Oatway =

Bermudian swimmer (1931–2003)

Personal information
- Full name: Derek Anthony Oatway
- Born: 10 January 1931 Pembroke Parish, Bermuda
- Died: 15 January 2003 (aged 72) Florida, United States

Sport
- Sport: Swimming

Derek Anthony Oatway (10 January 1931 – 15 January 2003) was a Bermudian swimmer. He competed in four events at the 1948 Summer Olympics.
