= Swimming at the 1952 Summer Olympics – Women's 4 × 100 metre freestyle relay =

Women's 4 × 100 metre freestyle relay at the Games of the XV Olympiad
- Venue: Helsinki Swimming Stadium
- Date: 30 July 1952 (heats); 1 August 1952 (final)
- Competitors: 53 from 13 nations
- Teams: 13
- Winning time: 4:32.5 WR

Medalists
1st place, gold medalist(s)		Ilona Novák, Judit Temes, Éva Gérard-Novák, Katalin Szőke	Hungary
2nd place, silver medalist(s)		Marie-Louise Linssen-Vaessen, Koosje van Voorn, Hannie Termeulen, Irma Heijting-Schuhmacher	Netherlands
3rd place, bronze medalist(s)		Jackie LaVine, Marilee Stepan, Jody Alderson, Evelyn Kawamoto	United States

The women's 4 × 100 metre freestyle relay event at the 1952 Olympic Games took place on 30 July and 1 August at the Swimming Stadium. This swimming event used freestyle as a relay, with swimmers typically using the front crawl. Because an Olympic size swimming pool is 50 metres long, each of the four swimmers completed two lengths of the pool. The first swimmer had to touch the wall before the second could leave the starting block; timing of the starts was thus important.

== Results ==
=== Heats ===
Heat One

Place	Swimmers	Time	Notes
1	Mária Littomeritzky, Éva Gérard-Novák, Ilona Novák and Katalin Szőke (HUN)	4:32.5	
2	Phyllis Linton, Jean Botham, Angela Barnwell and Lillian Preece (GBR)	4:36.0	
3	Rita Larsen, Mette Ove Petersen, Greta Andersen and Ragnhild Hveger (DEN)	4:36.4	
4	Vera Schäferkordt, Kati Jansen, Elisabeth Rechlin and Gisela Jacob-Arendt (GER)	4:42.7	
5	Maria Nardi, Fides Benini, Eva Belaise and Romana Calligaris (ITA)	4:52.6	
6	Yasuko Oishi, Fumiko Sakaguchi, Misako Tamura and Sadako Yamashita (JPN)	4:54.0	NR

Heat Two

Place	Swimmers	Time	Notes
1	Evelyn Kawamoto, Jackie LaVine, Marilee Stepan and Jody Alderson (USA)	4:28.1	
2	Marie-Louise Linssen-Vaessen, Koosje van Voorn, Hannie Termeulen and Irma Heijting-Schuhmacher (NED)	4:30.6	
3	Marianne Lundquist, Anita Andersson, Maud Berglund and Ingegerd Fredin (SWE)	4:38.1	
4	Josette Arène, Maryse Morandini, Gaby Tanguy and Ginette Jany-Sendral (FRA)	4:42.0	
5	Irene Strong, Lenora Fisher, Gladys Priestley and Kay McNamee (CAN)	4:54.8	
6	Nicole Guilini, Huguette Peeters, Irène Possemiers and Sybille Verckist (BEL)	4:54.8	
7	Raili Riuttala, Ritva Koivula, Anneli Haaranen and Ritva Järvinen (FIN)	4:56.0	

=== Final ===
Place	Swimmers	Time	Notes
1st place, gold medalist(s)	Ilona Novák, Judit Temes, Éva Gérard-Novák, and Katalin Szőke (HUN)	4:24.4	WR
2nd place, silver medalist(s)	Marie-Louise Linssen-Vaessen, Koosje van Voorn, Hannie Termeulen and Irma Heijting-Schuhmacher (NED)	4:29.0	
3rd place, bronze medalist(s)	Jackie LaVine, Marilee Stepan, Jody Alderson and Evelyn Kawamoto (USA)	4:30.1	
4	Rita Larsen, Mette Ove Petersen, Greta Andersen and Ragnhild Hveger (DEN)	4:36.2	
5	Phyllis Linton, Jean Botham, Angela Barnwell and Lillian Preece (GBR)	4:37.8	
6	Marianne Lundquist, Anita Andersson, Maud Berglund and Ingegerd Fredin (SWE)	4:39.0	
7	Elisabeth Rechlin, Vera Schäferkordt, Kati Jansen and Gisela Jacob-Arendt (GER)	4:40.3	
8	Gaby Tanguy, Maryse Morandini, Ginette Jany-Sendral and Josette Arène (FRA)	4:44.1	
