= Swimming at the 1952 Summer Olympics – Women's 100 metre freestyle =

Women's 100 metre freestyle at the Games of the XV Olympiad
- Venue: Helsinki Swimming Stadium
- Dates: 26 July 1952 (heats); 27 July 1952 (semifinals); 28 July 1952 (finals)
- Competitors: 41 from 19 nations
- Winning time: 1:06.8

Medalists
1st place, gold medalist(s)		Katalin Szőke; Hungary
2nd place, silver medalist(s)		Hannie Termeulen; Netherlands
3rd place, bronze medalist(s)		Judit Temes; Hungary

The women's 100 metre freestyle event at the 1952 Olympic Games took place between 26 and 28 July at the Swimming Stadium. This swimming event used freestyle swimming, which means that the method of the stroke is not regulated (unlike backstroke, breaststroke, and butterfly events). Nearly all swimmers use the front crawl or a variant of that stroke. Because an Olympic size swimming pool is 50 metres long, this race consisted of two lengths of the pool.

== Results ==
=== Heats ===
Heat 1

Rank	Athlete	Country	Time	Notes
1	Irma Heijting-Schuhmacher	Netherlands	1:06.7	
2	Ilona Novák	Hungary	1:07.7	
3	Elisabeth Rechlin	Germany	1:08.5	
4	Mette Ove Petersen	Denmark	1:09.6	
5	Maria Nardi	Italy	1:13.2	
6	Sadako Yamashita	Japan	1:13.2	
7	Cynthia Eager	Hong Kong	1:16.8	

Heat 2

Rank	Athlete	Country	Time	Notes
1	Hannie Termeulen	Netherlands	1:07.3	
2	Greta Andersen	Denmark	1:08.0	
3	Judy Roberts	United States	1:08.2	
4	Marianne Lundquist	Sweden	1:10.8	
5	Vera Schäferkordt	Germany	1:10.9	
6	Romana Calligaris	Italy	1:11.0	
7	Dolly Nazir	India	1:24.6	

Heat 3

Rank	Athlete	Country	Time	Notes
1	Katalin Szőke	Hungary	1:07.1	
2	Koosje van Voorn	Netherlands	1:07.4	
3	Josette Arène	France	1:09.1	
4	Jean Botham	Great Britain	1:10.5	
5	Fumiko Sakaguchi	Japan	1:14.6	
6	Irene Strong	Canada	1:15.1	

Heat 4

Rank	Athlete	Country	Time	Notes
1	Joan Harrison	South Africa	1:06.5	
2	Jody Alderson	United States	1:07.4	
3	Angela Barnwell	Great Britain	1:07.6	
4	Ingegerd Fredin	Sweden	1:08.0	
5	Denise Norton	Australia	1:11.8	
6	Gladys Priestley	Canada	1:13.4	
7	Raili Riuttala	Finland	1:13.5	

Heat 5

Rank	Athlete	Country	Time	Notes
1	Judit Temes	Hungary	1:05.5	OR
2	Ragnhild Hveger	Denmark	1:08.6	
3	Maud Berglund	Sweden	1:09.8	
4	Lillian Preece	Great Britain	1:10.0	
5	Ritva Järvinen	Finland	1:11.5	
6	Sybille Verckist	Belgium	1:13.7	
7	Shizue Miyabe	Japan	1:16.6	

Heat 6

Rank	Athlete	Country	Time	Notes
1	Marilee Stepan	United States	1:07.7	
2	Marjorie McQuade	Australia	1:07.9	
3	Ana María Schultz	Argentina	1:10.6	
4	Gaby Tanguy	France	1:10.6	
5	Kay McNamee	Canada	1:12.9	
6	Susy Vaterlaus	Switzerland	1:16.8	
7	Ritva Koivula	Finland	1:17.3	

=== Semifinals ===
==== Semifinal 1 ====
Rank	Athlete	Country	Time	Notes
1	Jody Alderson	United States	1:06.6	Q
2	Irma Heijting-Schuhmacher	Netherlands	1:06.7	Q
3	Hannie Termeulen	Netherlands	1:07.1	Q
4	Marilee Stepan	United States	1:07.4	Q
5	Judit Temes	Hungary	1:07.4	Q
6	Ragnhild Hveger	Denmark	1:07.7	
7	Marjorie McQuade	Australia	1:08.2	
8	Ingegerd Fredin	Sweden	1:08.7	

==== Semifinal 2 ====
Rank	Athlete	Country	Time	Notes
1	Joan Harrison	South Africa	1:07.2	Q
2	Katalin Szőke	Hungary	1:07.2	Q
3	Angela Barnwell	Great Britain	1:07.2	Q
4	Ilona Novák	Hungary	1:07.8	
5	Koosje van Voorn	Netherlands	1:08.1	
6	Greta Andersen	Denmark	1:08.2	
7	Judy Roberts	United States	1:08.2	
8	Elisabeth Rechlin	Germany	1:08.5	

=== Final ===
Rank	Athlete	Country	Time	Notes
1	Katalin Szőke	Hungary	1:06.8	
2	Hannie Termeulen	Netherlands	1:07.0	
3	Judit Temes	Hungary	1:07.1	
4	Joan Harrison	South Africa	1:07.1	
5	Jody Alderson	United States	1:07.1	
6	Irma Heijting-Schuhmacher	Netherlands	1:07.3	
7	Marilee Stepan	United States	1:08.0	
8	Angela Barnwell	Great Britain	1:08.6	
