= Swimming at the 1952 Summer Olympics – Women's 400 metre freestyle =

Women's 400 metre freestyle at the Games of the XV Olympiad
- Venue: Helsinki Swimming Stadium
- Date: 31 July 1952 (heats); 1 August 1952 (semifinals); 2 August 1952 (final)
- Competitors: 34 from 17 nations
- Winning time: 5:12.1 OR

Medalists
| 1st place, gold medalist(s) | | Valéria Gyenge | Hungary |
| 2nd place, silver medalist(s) | | Éva Novák | Hungary |
| 3rd place, bronze medalist(s) | | Evelyn Kawamoto | United States |

The women's 400 metre freestyle event at the 1952 Olympic Games took place between 31 July and 2 August at the Swimming Stadium. This swimming event used freestyle swimming, which means that the method of the stroke is not regulated (unlike backstroke, breaststroke, and butterfly events). Nearly all swimmers use the front crawl or a variant of that stroke. Because an Olympic size swimming pool is 50 metres long, this race consisted of sixteen lengths of the pool.

== Results ==
=== Heats ===
Sixteen fastest swimmers advanced to semi-finals.

Heat 1

| Rank | Athlete | Country | Time | Notes |
|---|---|---|---|---|
| 1 | Ana María Schultz | Argentina | 5:26.1 | Q |
| 2 | Huguette Peters | Belgium | 5:29.8 | Q |
| 3 | Mette Petersen | Denmark | 5:30.6 | |
| 4 | Grace Wood | Great Britain | 5:31.2 | |
| 5 | Kay McNamee | Canada | 5:50.5 | |
| 6 | Geertje Wielema | Netherlands | 6:02.6 | |

Heat 2

| Rank | Athlete | Country | Time | Notes |
|---|---|---|---|---|
| 1 | Ragnhild Hveger | Denmark | 5:19.6 | Q |
| 2 | Éva Székely | Hungary | 5:20.9 | Q |
| 3 | Judy Davies | Australia | 5:21.2 | Q |
| 4 | Delia Meulenkamp | United States | 5:21.4 | Q |
| 5 | Lillian Preece | Great Britain | 5:32.1 | |
| 6 | Sybille Verckist | Belgium | 5:40.1 | |
| 7 | Ritva Järvinen | Finland | 5:53.5 | |

Heat 3

| Rank | Athlete | Country | Time | Notes |
|---|---|---|---|---|
| 1 | Valéria Gyenge | Hungary | 5:22.6 | Q |
| 2 | Carolyn Green | United States | 5:23.8 | Q |
| 3 | Colette Thomas | France | 5:36.8 | |
| 4 | Elisabeth Rechlin | Germany | 5:38.0 | |
| 5 | Johanna Termeulen | Netherlands | 5:45.5 | |
| 6 | Gladys Priestley | Canada | 5:52.7 | |
| 7 | Cynthia Eager | Hong Kong | 5:55.8 | |

Heat 4

| Rank | Athlete | Country | Time | Notes |
|---|---|---|---|---|
| 1 | Evelyn Kawamoto | United States | 5:16.6 | Q |
| 2 | Daphne Wilkinson | Great Britain | 5:16.6 | Q |
| 3 | Joan Harrison | South Africa | 5:21.8 | Q |
| 4 | Ingegärd Fredin | Sweden | 5:28.7 | Q |
| 5 | Ginette Jany | France | 5:32.6 | |
| 6 | Irma Heyting-Schumacher | Netherlands | 5:45.2 | |
| 7 | Sadako Yamashita | Japan | 5:48.4 | |

Heat 5

| Rank | Athlete | Country | Time | Notes |
|---|---|---|---|---|
| 1 | Éva Novák | Hungary | 5:19.1 | Q |
| 2 | Greta Andersen | Denmark | 5:21.3 | Q |
| 3 | Piedade Coutinho-Tavares | Brazil | 5:26.9 | Q |
| 4 | Denise Norton | Australia | 5:28.5 | Q |
| 5 | Marianne Lundqvist | Sweden | 5:34.4 | |
| 6 | Josette Arene | France | 5:44.1 | |
| 7 | Misako Tamura | Japan | 5:59.0 | |

=== Semifinals ===
Eight fastest swimmers advanced to the finals.

Heat 1

| Rank | Athlete | Country | Time | Notes |
|---|---|---|---|---|
| 1 | Evelyn Kawamoto | United States | 5:21.2 | Q |
| 2 | Éva Novák | Hungary | 5:21.3 | Q |
| 3 | Ana María Schultz | Argentina | 5:22.0 | Q |
| 4 | Greta Andersen | Denmark | 5:22.1 | Q |
| 5 | Joan Harrison | South Africa | 5:23.1 | |
| 6 | Judy Davies | Australia | 5:25.6 | |
| 7 | Piedade Coutinho-Tavares | Brazil | 5:28.5 | |
| | Ingegärd Fredin | Sweden | – | |

Heat 2

| Rank | Athlete | Country | Time | Notes |
|---|---|---|---|---|
| 1 | Valéria Gyenge | Hungary | 5:16.9 | Q |
| 2 | Carolyn Green | United States | 5:18.3 | Q |
| 3 | Éva Székely | Hungary | 5:19.3 | Q |
| 4 | Ragnhild Hveger | Denmark | 5:19.5 | Q |
| 5 | Daphne Wilkinson | Great Britain | 5:27.2 | |
| 6 | Delia Meulenkamp | United States | 5:27.9 | |
| 7 | Denise Norton | Australia | 5:30.9 | |
| 8 | Huguette Peters | Belgium | 5:36.5 | |

=== Final ===
| Rank | Athlete | Country | Time | Notes |
|---|---|---|---|---|
| 1 | Valéria Gyenge | Hungary | 5:12.1 | OR |
| 2 | Éva Novák | Hungary | 5:13.7 | |
| 3 | Evelyn Kawamoto | United States | 5:14.6 | |
| 4 | Carolyn Green | United States | 5:16.5 | |
| 5 | Ragnhild Hveger | Denmark | 5:16.9 | |
| 6 | Éva Székely | Hungary | 5:17.9 | |
| 7 | Ana María Schultz | Argentina | 5:24.0 | |
| 8 | Greta Andersen | Denmark | 5:27.0 | |

Key: OR = Olympic record
