= Swimming at the 1948 Summer Olympics – Women's 100 metre freestyle =

Women's 100 metre freestyle at the Games of the XIV Olympiad
- Venue: Wembley Arena
- Date: 30 July 1948 (heats); 31 July 1948 (semifinals); 2 August 1948 (final)
- Competitors: 34 from 14 nations
- Winning time: 1:06.3

Medalists
1st place, gold medalist(s)		Greta Andersen; Denmark
2nd place, silver medalist(s)		Ann Curtis; United States
3rd place, bronze medalist(s)		Marie-Louise Linssen-Vaessen; Netherlands

The women's 100 metre freestyle event at the 1948 Olympic Games took place between 30 July and 2 August at the Empire Pool. This swimming event used freestyle swimming, which means that the method of the stroke is not regulated (unlike backstroke, breaststroke, and butterfly events). Nearly all swimmers use the front crawl or a variant of that stroke. Because an Olympic size swimming pool is 50 metres long, this race consisted of two lengths of the pool.

== Results ==
=== Heats ===
Rank	Athlete	Country	Time	Notes
1	Fritze Carstensen	Denmark	1:06.5	
2	Ann Curtis	United States	1:06.9	
3	Greta Andersen	Denmark	1:07.0	
4	Marie-Louise Linssen-Vaessen	Netherlands	1:07.5	
5	Irma Heijting-Schuhmacher	Netherlands	1:07.9	
6	Ingegerd Fredin	Sweden	1:08.1	
7	Judit Temes	Hungary	1:08.3	
8	Karen Margrethe Harup	Denmark	1:08.4	
9	Marie Corridon	United States	1:08.4	
10	Marjorie McQuade	Australia	1:08.5	
11	Piedade Coutinho-Tavares	Brazil	1:08.6	
12	Elisabeth Ahlgren	Sweden	1:08.7	
13	Brenda Helser	United States	1:09.0	
14	Marianne Lundquist	Sweden	1:09.0	
15	Lillian Preece	Great Britain	1:09.0	
16	Patricia Nielsen	Great Britain	1:09.4	
17	Josette Arène	France	1:09.7	
18	Margaret Wellington	Great Britain	1:09.8	
19	Hannie Termeulen	Netherlands	1:09.8	
20	Denise Spencer	Australia	1:10.0	
21	Eleonora Schmitt	Brazil	1:10.8	
22	Eileen Holt	Argentina	1:12.0	
23	Ginette Jany-Sendral	France	1:12.1	
24	Fernande Caroen	Belgium	1:12.1	
25	Magda Bruggemann	Mexico	1:12.5	
26	Mária Littomeritzky	Hungary	1:13.0	
27	Kay McNamee	Canada	1:13.3	
28	Irene Strong	Canada	1:13.5	
29	Gisèle Vallerey	France	1:14.0	
30	Enriqueta Duarte	Argentina	1:14.9	
31	Zsuzsa Nádor	Hungary	1:15.8	
32	Maria da Costa	Brazil	1:16.0	
33	Adriana Camelli	Argentina	1:16.5	
34	Marianne Erismann	Switzerland	1:19.9	

=== Semifinals ===
Rank	Athlete	Country	Time	Notes
1	Greta Andersen	Denmark	1:05.9	Q
2	Fritze Carstensen	Denmark	1:07.5	Q
3	Ann Curtis	United States	1:07.6	Q
4	Irma Heijting-Schuhmacher	Netherlands	1:07.7	Q
5	Marie-Louise Linssen-Vaessen	Netherlands	1:08.4	Q
6	Ingegerd Fredin	Sweden	1:08.4	Q
7	Elisabeth Ahlgren	Sweden	1:08.6	q
8	Karen Margrethe Harup	Denmark	1:08.7	q
9	Marie Corridon	United States	1:08.9	
10	Marianne Lundquist	Sweden	1:09.3	
11	Lillian Preece	Great Britain	1:09.3	
12	Marjorie McQuade	Australia	1:09.5	
13	Piedade Coutinho-Tavares	Brazil	1:09.5	
14	Patricia Nielsen	Great Britain	1:09.6	
15	Judit Temes	Hungary	1:09.7	
16	Brenda Helser	United States	1:10.0	

=== Final ===
Rank	Athlete	Country	Time	Notes
1	Greta Andersen	Denmark	1:06.3	
2	Ann Curtis	United States	1:06.5	
3	Marie-Louise Linssen-Vaessen	Netherlands	1:07.6	
4	Karen Margrethe Harup	Denmark	1:08.1	
5	Ingegerd Fredin	Sweden	1:08.4	
6	Irma Heijting-Schuhmacher	Netherlands	1:08.4	
7	Elisabeth Ahlgren	Sweden	1:08.8	
8	Fritze Carstensen	Denmark	1:09.1	
