= Denmark at the 1952 Summer Olympics =

- IOC code: DEN
- NOC: Danish Olympic Committee

in Helsinki
- Competitors: 129 in 15 sports
- Flag bearer: Erik Swane Lund
- Medals Ranked 15th: Gold 2 Silver 1 Bronze 3 Total 6

Summer Olympics appearances (overview)
- 1896; 1900; 1904; 1908; 1912; 1920; 1924; 1928; 1932; 1936; 1948; 1952; 1956; 1960; 1964; 1968; 1972; 1976; 1980; 1984; 1988; 1992; 1996; 2000; 2004; 2008; 2012; 2016; 2020; 2024; 2028

Other related appearances
- 1906 Intercalated Games

Denmark competed at the 1952 Summer Olympics in Helsinki, Finland. 129 competitors, 115 men and 14 women, took part in 73 events in 15 sports.

== Medalists ==
Medal	Name	Sport	Event	Date
Gold	Bent Peder Rasch; Finn Haunstoft	Canoeing	Men's C-2 1000 m	28 July
Gold	Paul Elvstrøm	Sailing	Men's Finn	28 July
Silver	Lis Hartel	Equestrian	Dressage individual	29 July
Bronze	Jørgen Frantzen; Svend Ove Petersen; Poul Svendsen	Rowing	Men's coxed pair	23 July
Bronze	Karen Lachmann	Fencing	Women's foil individual	27 July
Bronze	Victor Jörgensen	Boxing	Men's Welterweight	2 August

== Boxing ==
Men's Flyweight

- Kjeld Steen (16th=)

Men's Lightweight

- Niels Bertelsen (17th=)

Men's Light welterweight

- Hans Petersen (17th=)

Men's Welterweight

- Victor Jörgensen Bronze

Men's Light middleweight

- Ebbe Kops (17th=)

== Cycling ==
Road Competition

Men's Individual Road Race (190.4 km)

- Hans Andresen — 5:11:18.5 (→ 8th place)
- Jørgen Frank Rasmussen — 5:14:09.4 (→ 19th place)
- Wedell Østergaard — 5:22:34.1 (→ 37th place)
- Helge Hansen — 5:27:08.8 (→ 52nd place)

Track Competition

Men's 1.000m Time Trial

- Ib Vagn Hansen
  - Final — 1:14.4 (→ 6th place)

Men's 1.000m Sprint Scratch Race

- Ove Krogh Rants — 12th place

Men's 4.000m Team Pursuit

- Bent Jørgensen, Jean Hansen, Knud Andersen, Preben Lundgren Kristensen, and Henning R. Larsen
  - Eliminated in quarterfinals (→ 6th place)

== Diving ==
Men

Athlete	Event	Preliminary		Final	
Athlete	Event	Points	Rank	Points	Rank
Thomas Christiansen	10 m platform	69.10	11	Did not advance	
Jacob Gjerding	10 m platform	65.88	15	Did not advance	

== Equestrian ==
=== Dressage ===
Athlete	Horse	Event	Final	
Athlete	Horse	Event	Score	Rank
Lis Hartel	Jubilee	Individual	541.5	Silver medal
Kristian Jensen	Odense	Individual	439.0	18

=== Eventing ===
Athlete	Horse	Event	Dressage		Cross-country			Jumping			Total	
Athlete	Horse	Event	Dressage		Cross-country			Final			Total	
Athlete	Horse	Event	Penalties	Rank	Penalties	Total	Rank	Penalties	Total	Rank	Penalties	Rank
Otto Mønsted Acthon	Sirdar	Individual	121.66	12	126.00	247.66	27	20	267.66	26	267.66	26
Hans Christian Andersen	Tom	Individual	142.20	29	40.00	182.20	20	40	222.20	25	222.20	25
Aage Rubæk-Nielsen	Sahara	Individual	119.00	10	200.00	319.00	29	20	339.00	30	339.00	30
Otto Mønsted Acthon; Hans Christian Andersen; Aage Rubæk-Nielsen	See above	Team	382.86	5	366.00	748.86	5	80.00	828.86	5	828.86	5

== Fencing ==
12 fencers, 9 men and 3 women, represented Denmark in 1952.

Men's épée

- Mogens Lüchow
- René Dybkær
- Raimondo Carnera

Men's team épée

- Raimondo Carnera, Erik Swane Lund, René Dybkær, Mogens Lüchow, Ib Nielsen, Jakob Lyng

Men's sabre

- Palle Frey
- Raimondo Carnera
- Ivan Ruben

Men's team sabre

- Paul Theisen, Raimondo Carnera, Ivan Ruben, Palle Frey, Jakob Lyng

Women's foil

- Karen Lachmann
- Ulla Barding-Poulsen
- Kate Mahaut

== Football ==
First round

15 July 1952
19:00

Denmark	2–1	Greece
P.E. Petersen 36', 37'	Report	Emmanouilidis 85'

Ratina Stadion, Tampere
Attendance: 4,372
Referee: Waldemar Karni (FIN)

Second round

21 July 1952
19:00

Denmark	2–0	Poland
Seebach 17'; S. Nielsen 69'	Report

Kupittaa, Turku
Attendance: 6,024
Referee: Folke Bålstad (NOR)

Quarter finals

25 July 1952
19:00

Yugoslavia	5–3	Denmark
Čajkovski 19'; Ognjanov 35'; Vukas 41'; Bobek 78'; Zebec 81'	Report	Lundberg 63'; Seebach 85'; Hansen 87'

Töölön Pallokenttä, Helsinki
Attendance: 11,456
Referee: Waldemar Karni (FIN)
- Team roster
  - Poul Andersen, B 93
  - Steen Blicher, AB
  - Jens Peter Hansen, Esbjerg fB
  - Jørgen W. Hansen, KB
  - Jørgen Johansen, KB (goalkeeper)
  - Knud Lundberg, AB
  - Svend Nielsen, B 93
  - Poul Petersen, AB
  - Poul Erik Petersen, Køge BK
  - Holger Seebach, AB
  - Erik Terkelsen, Esbjerg fB
  - Reserve: Søren Andersen, Esbjerg fB
  - Reserve: Henry From, AGF
  - Reserve: Ralf Ginsborg, Hellerup IK
  - Reserve: Carl Holm, B 1903
  - Reserve: Aage Rou Jensen, AGF
  - Reserve: Knud Blak Jensen, KB
  - Reserve: Per Knudsen, AGF
  - Reserve: Jørgen Olesen, AGF
  - Reserve: Jens Torstensen, Odense KFUM

Head coach: Axel Bjerregaard

== Rowing ==
Denmark had 25 male rowers participate in six out of seven rowing events in 1952.

Men

Athlete	Event	Heats		Repechage		Semifinal		Second Repechage		Final	
Athlete	Event	Time	Rank	Time	Rank	Time	Rank	Time	Rank	Time	Rank
Aage Larsen; Ebbe Parsner	Men's double sculls	7:27.3	4 R	7:09.3	3	Did not advance					13
Bent Jensen; Palle Tillisch	Coxless pair	8:13.3	2 R	BYE		8:15.7	4 R	7:47.1	2	Did not advance	8
Svend Ove Pedersen; Poul Svendsen; Jørgen Frantzen	Coxed pair	8:02.7	2 Q	BYE		8:18.7	3 Q	7:51.2	1 Q	8:34.9	Bronze medal
Knud Bruun Jensen; Carl Nielsen; Harry Nielsen; Paul Locht	Coxless four	6:50.5	4 R	6:51.9	2	Did not advance					13
Niels Kristensen; Ove Nielsen; Peter Hansen; Bent Blach Petersen; Eivin Kristensen	Coxed four	7:33.9	3 R	7:03.4	1 Q	BYE		7:08.6	3	Did not advance	9
Bjørn Stybert; Preben Hoch; Mogens Snogdahl; Jørn Snogdahl; Helge Muxoll Schrøder; Björn Brönnum; Leif Hermansen; Ole Scavenius Jensen; John Vilhelmsen	Men's eight	6:17.9	4 R	6:17.8	1 Q	BYE		6:16.0	3	Did not advance	8

== Sailing ==
Open

Athlete	Event	Race							Net points	Final rank
Athlete	Event	1	2	3	4	5	6	7	Net points	Final rank
Paul Elvstrøm	Finn	1	~~5~~	1	1	3	4	1	8209	Gold medal
William Berntsen; Aage Birch; Ole Berntsen	Dragon	3	7	1	5	4	8	~~17~~	4460	5
Poul Ohff; Henning Christensen; Ingemann Bylling Jensen	5.5 Metre	5	7	~~DNF~~	13	5	5	DSQ	2469	11

== Shooting ==
Five shooters represented Denmark in 1952.

Men

Athlete	Event	Final	
Athlete	Event	Score	Rank
Allan Christensen	Trap	165	31
Jørgen Hare	Men's 50 m rifle prone	392	38
Uffe Schultz Larsen	Men's 300 m rifle three positions	1067	15
Uffe Schultz Larsen	Men's 50 m rifle three positions	1152	15
Uffe Schultz Larsen	Men's 50 m rifle prone	394	28
Per Nielsen	Men's 25 m pistol	527	47
Per Winge	Men's 25 m pistol	549	27

== Swimming ==
Men

Athlete	Event	Heat		Semifinal		Final	
Athlete	Event	Time	Rank	Time	Rank	Time	Rank
Knud Gleie	200 metre breaststroke	2:51.4	6	Did not advance			

Women

Athlete	Event	Heat		Semifinal		Final	
Athlete	Event	Time	Rank	Time	Rank	Time	Rank
Greta Andersen	100 metre freestroke	1:08.0	2 Q	1:08.2	12	Did not advance	
Greta Andersen	400 metre freestroke	5:21.3	2 Q	5:22.1	8 Q	5:27.0	8
Jytte Hansen	200 metre breaststroke	2:57.7	3 Q	2:59.5	7 Q	2:57.8	5
Ragnhild Hveger	100 metre freestroke	1:08.6	2 Q	1:07.7	9	Did not advance	
Ragnhild Hveger	400 metre freestroke	5:19.6	1 Q	5:19.5	4 Q	5:16.9	5
Kirsten Hedegaard Jensen	200 metre breaststroke	3:07.5	21	Did not advance			
Gerda Olsen	100 metre backstroke	1:20.1	5	Did not advance			
Mette Ove Petersen	100 metre freestroke	1:09.6	4	Did not advance			
Mette Ove Petersen	400 metre freestroke	5:30.6	3	Did not advance			
Eileen Ward Petersen	200 metre breaststroke	3:09.3	22	Did not advance			
Rita Larsen; Mette Ove Petersen; Greta Andersen; Ragnhild Hveger	4 x 100 metre freestyle	4:36.4	3 Q	—N/a		4:36.2	4

== Weightlifting ==
Men

Athlete	Event	Military Press		Snatch		Clean & Jerk		Total	Rank
Athlete	Event	Result	Rank	Result	Rank	Result	Rank	Total	Rank
Johan Runge	67.5 kg	105	2	97.5	12	127.5	9	330	7
Jørgen Moritzen	75 kg	97.5	16	105	12	137.5	12	340	13
Jens Jørn Mortensen	90 kg	102.5	16	100	19	142.5	12	345	15
