= Swimming at the 1952 Summer Olympics =

Swimming at the Games of the XV Olympiad
- Venue: Helsinki Swimming Stadium
- Dates: 26 July – 2 August 1952
- No. of events: 11
- Competitors: 319 from 48 nations

At the 1952 Summer Olympics in Helsinki, a total number of eleven swimming events were contested, six for men and five for women. The events were held at the Swimming Stadium. There was a total of 319 participants from 48 countries competing.

== Medal table ==
| Rank | Nation | Gold | Silver | Bronze | Total |
|---|---|---|---|---|---|
| 1 | United States | 4 | 2 | 3 | 9 |
| 2 | Hungary | 4 | 2 | 1 | 7 |
| 3 | France | 1 | 1 | 1 | 3 |
| 4 | Australia | 1 | 0 | 0 | 1 |
| 4 | South Africa | 1 | 0 | 0 | 1 |
| 6 | Japan | 0 | 3 | 0 | 3 |
| 6 | Netherlands | 0 | 3 | 0 | 3 |
| 8 | Sweden | 0 | 0 | 2 | 2 |
| 9 | Brazil | 0 | 0 | 1 | 1 |
| 9 | Germany | 0 | 0 | 1 | 1 |
| 9 | Great Britain | 0 | 0 | 1 | 1 |
| 9 | New Zealand | 0 | 0 | 1 | 1 |
| Totals (12 entries) | | 11 | 11 | 11 | 33 |

== Medal summary ==
=== Men's events ===
| Games | Gold | | Silver | | Bronze | |
|---|---|---|---|---|---|---|
| 100 m freestyle | Clarke Scholes; United States | 57.4 | Hiroshi Suzuki; Japan | 57.4 | Göran Larsson; Sweden | 58.2 |
| 400 m freestyle | Jean Boiteux; France | 4:30.7 (OR) | Ford Konno; United States | 4:31.3 | Per-Olof Östrand; Sweden | 4:35.2 |
| 1500 m freestyle | Ford Konno; United States | 18:30.3 (OR) | Shiro Hashizume; Japan | 18:41.4 | Tetsuo Okamoto; Brazil | 18:51.3 |
| 100 m backstroke | Yoshi Oyakawa; United States | 1:05.4 (OR) | Gilbert Bozon; France | 1:06.2 | Jack Taylor; United States | 1:06.4 |
| 200 m breaststroke | John Davies; Australia | 2:34.4 (OR) | Bowen Stassforth; United States | 2:34.7 | Herbert Klein; Germany | 2:35.9 |
| 4 × 200 m freestyle relay | United States; Wayne Moore; Bill Woolsey; Ford Konno; Jimmy McLane | 8:31.1 (OR) | Japan; Hiroshi Suzuki; Yoshihiro Hamaguchi; Toru Goto; Teijiro Tanikawa | 8:33.5 | France; Joseph Bernardo; Aldo Eminente; Alexandre Jany; Jean Boiteux | 8:45.9 |

=== Women's events ===
| Games | Gold | | Silver | | Bronze | |
|---|---|---|---|---|---|---|
| 100 m freestyle | Katalin Szöke; Hungary | 1:06.8 | Hannie Termeulen; Netherlands | 1:07.0 | Judit Temes; Hungary | 1:07.1 |
| 400 m freestyle | Valéria Gyenge; Hungary | 5:12.1 (OR) | Éva Novák; Hungary | 5:13.7 | Evelyn Kawamoto; United States | 5:14.6 |
| 100 m backstroke | Joan Harrison; South Africa | 1:14.3 | Geertje Wielema; Netherlands | 1:14.5 | Jean Stewart; New Zealand | 1:15.8 |
| 200 m breaststroke | Éva Székely; Hungary | 2:51.7 (OR) | Éva Novák; Hungary | 2:54.4 | Helen Gordon; Great Britain | 2:57.6 |
| 4 × 100 m freestyle relay | Hungary; Ilona Novák; Judit Temes; Éva Novák; Katalin Szöke | 4:24.4 (WR) | Netherlands; Marie-Louise Linssen-Vaessen; Koosje van Voorn; Hannie Termeulen; Irma Heijting-Schuhmacher | 4:29.0 | United States; Jackie LaVine; Marilee Stepan; Jody Alderson; Evelyn Kawamoto | 4:30.1 |

== Participating nations ==
319 swimmers from 48 nations competed.

- Argentina (7)
- Australia (10)
- Austria (3)
- Belgium (10)
- Bermuda (2)
- Brazil (12)
- Canada (9)
- Ceylon (1)
- Chile (1)
- China (1)
- Cuba (2)
- Czechoslovakia (4)
- Denmark (9)
- Egypt (3)
- Finland (13)
- France (16)
- Germany (9)
- Great Britain (21)
- Guatemala (1)
- Hong Kong (4)
- Hungary (15)
- India (5)
- Indonesia (1)
- Israel (1)
- Italy (10)
- Japan (22)
- Luxembourg (1)
- Mexico (8)
- Netherlands (13)
- New Zealand (2)
- Norway (3)
- Pakistan (2)
- Philippines (1)
- Poland (7)
- Portugal (4)
- Romania (1)
- Saar (1)
- Singapore (1)
- South Africa (6)
- Soviet Union (18)
- Spain (3)
- Sweden (12)
- Switzerland (8)
- United States (30)
- Uruguay (1)
- Venezuela (1)
- Vietnam (1)
- Yugoslavia (3)
