= Mária Littomeritzky =

Hungarian swimmer (1927–2017)

Personal information
- Full name: Littomeritzky Mária
- Nationality: Hungary
- Born: May 12, 1927 Szeged, Hungary
- Died: December 24, 2017 (aged 90) Budapest, Hungary

Sport
- Sport: Swimming
- Strokes: butterfly
- Club: BVSC
Medal record
Olympic Games
Gold medal – first place	1952 Helsinki	4×100 m freestyle
European Championships (LC)
Silver medal – second place	1954 Turin	100 m butterfly

Mária Littomeritzky (also known as Littomeritzky-Bognár; May 12, 1927 – December 24, 2017) was a butterfly swimmer from Hungary, who competed in three consecutive Summer Olympics for her native country, starting in 1948. She was born in Szeged.

Her best individual result came in 1956, when she placed fourth in 100 metres butterfly. At the 1952 Summer Olympics she started in the heats of the 4×100 freestyle relay but was replaced for the final. Her team-mates Ilona Novák, Judit Temes, Éva Novák, Katalin Szőke won the final with a new world record and Littomeritzky also received a gold medal. At the European Championships she won a silver medal in 1954 in 100 m butterfly.
