= Grete Andersen =

Grete Andersen can refer to:

- Greta Andersen (1927–2023), Danish swimmer
- Grete Waitz (born Andersen, 1953–2011), Norwegian runner
- Grethe Andersen (born 1966), Norwegian politician
