= Jody Alderson =

American swimmer (1935–2021)

Personal information
- Full name: Joan Alderson
- Nickname: "Jody"
- National team: United States
- Born: March 5, 1935 Chicago, Illinois, U.S.
- Died: February 14, 2021 (aged 85) Stuart, Florida, U.S.
- Height: 5 ft 7 in (1.70 m)
- Weight: 130 lb (59 kg)

Sport
- Sport: Swimming
- Strokes: Freestyle
- Club: Chicago Town Club
Medal record
Women's swimming
Representing the United States
Olympic Games
Bronze medal – third place	1952 Helsinki	4×100 m freestyle

Joan Alderson (March 5, 1935 – February 14, 2021), later known by her married name Joan Braskamp, was an American competition swimmer and Olympic medalist. She received a bronze medal at the 1952 Summer Olympics.

Alderson was born and grew up in Chicago. Her father Edmund had been a collegiate swimmer at the University of Illinois, and she began swimming at the age of 5. She first trained under coach Bill Moyle at the Beverly Country Club, and then under coach Walter Schlueter of the Chicago Town Club where her elite swimming potential was recognized. Fellow Olympic swimmer Jackie LaVine, who also trained with the Chicago Town Club, served as her mentor.

As a 17-year-old, Alderson represented the United States at the 1952 Summer Olympics in Helsinki, Finland. She received a bronze medal as a member of the third-place U.S. team in the women's 4×100-meter freestyle relay, together with teammates Jackie LaVine, Marilee Stepan and Evelyn Kawamoto. Individually, she also competed in the women's 100-meter freestyle and finished fifth in the event final with a time of 1:07.1, only three tenths of a second behind the winner, Hungarian Katalin Szőke. According to the official event clock time of 1:07.1, Alderson finished in a third-place tie with Judit Temes of Hungary and Joan Harrison of South Africa, but the judges awarded her fifth place.

In addition to her athletic prowess, Alderson's attractive physical appearance was noted by news publications, several of which called her "blonde," "statuesque," "a blue-eyed whiz" with a "winning smile" and "pretty enough to win beauty contests."

After the Olympics, Alderson attended the University of Illinois, where she was a member of Kappa Kappa Gamma sorority. She continued to swim competitively while attending college, set a world record in the 100-yard freestyle event in 1954, and was a member of Amateur Athletic Union (AAU) national championship relay teams in 1952 and 1953. She married Lt. Bernard Braskamp, Jr., a U.S. Air Force officer in 1954, and retired from competitive swimming.

Alderson died in Stuart, Florida, on February 14, 2021, at the age of 85.

== See also ==
- List of Olympic medalists in swimming (women)
- List of University of Illinois at Urbana–Champaign people
