= Swane =

Swane is a surname. Notable people with the surname include:

- Christine Swane (1876–1960), Danish painter
- Erik Swane Lund (1923–2012), Danish fencer
- Sigurd Swane (1879–1973), Danish painter and poet

== See also ==
- Shane (name)
- Swan (disambiguation)
