= Koosje van Voorn =

Dutch swimmer

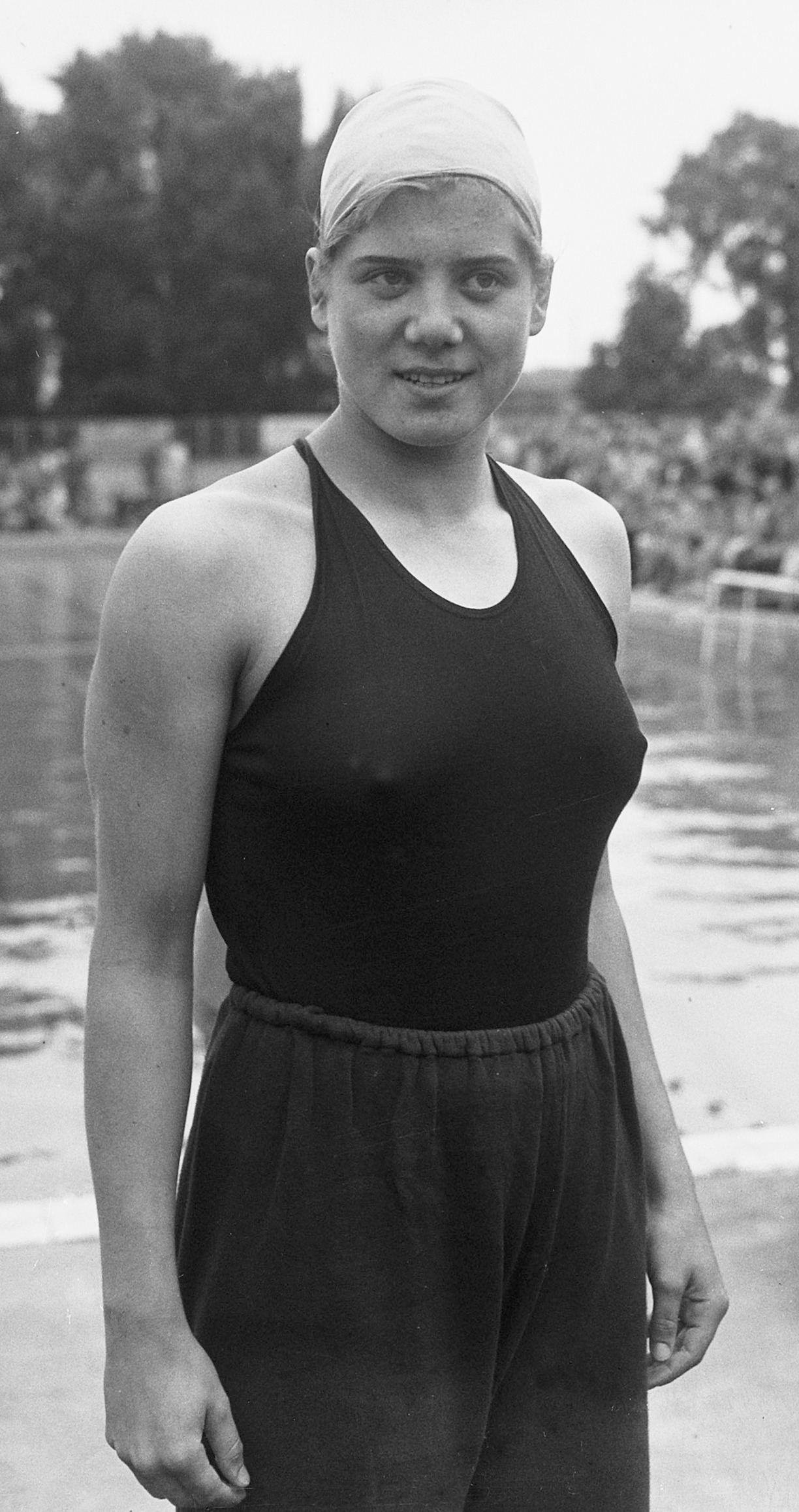
- Koosje van Voorn in 1952

Personal information
- Born: 15 January 1935 Groningen, the Netherlands
- Died: 5 August 2018 (aged 83) Scheveningen, the Netherlands

Sport
- Sport: Swimming
- Club: VZN, Groningen
Medal record
Women's swimming
Representing the Netherlands
Olympic Games
Silver medal – second place	1952 Helsinki	4×100 m freestyle
Universiade
Bronze medal – third place	1959 Turin	100 m freestyle

Koosje van Voorn, (15 January 1935 – 5 August 2018) was a freestyle swimmer from the Netherlands. She competed in the 100 m and 4 × 100 m relay events at the 1952 Summer Olympics and won a silver medal in the relay, alongside Marie-Louise Linssen-Vaessen, Irma Heijting-Schuhmacher and Hannie Termeulen.
