= Cynthia Eager =

Hong Kong swimmer

Personal information
- Full name: Maureen Cynthia Eager
- Nationality: Hong Konger
- Born: 24 November 1936 British Hong Kong
- Died: 25 August 1996 (aged 59) Keizer, Oregon, USA

Sport
- Sport: Swimming

Maureen Cynthia Eager (24 November 1936 – 25 August 1996) was a Hong Kong swimmer. Domestically, she would represent the Victoria Recreation Club. She also compete at the 1952 Summer Olympics, representing Hong Kong for their first appearance at an Olympic Games. She would compete in two freestyle events.

At the 1952 Summer Games, she would compete in the women's 100 metre freestyle and women's 400 metre freestyle. In both of the heats for the events, she would place last and would not advance to the semifinals. She later died in Keizer, Oregon, United States.

== Biography ==
Maureen Cynthia Eager was born on 24 November 1936 in British Hong Kong. Domestically, she would represent the Victoria Recreation Club.

Hong Kong would compete at the 1952 Summer Olympics in Helsinki, Finland, making their first appearance at any edition of the Olympic Games. There, Eager would compete as part of the team and be one of the first Olympians for Hong Kong. She would compete in two freestyle events in swimming.

She would first compete in the heats of the women's 100 metre freestyle on 26 July against six other competitors in her round. There, she would finish with a time of 1:16.8 and placed last in her heat; she would not advance to the semifinals. She would then compete in the heats of the women's 400 metre freestyle on 31 July against six other competitors in her round. There, she would finish with a time of 5:55.8 and would again place last in her heat; she would not advance to the semifinals.

Eager later died on 25 August 1996 in Keizer, Oregon, United States.
