= Erik Lund =

Erik Lund is the name of:

- Erik Lund (director) (1893–1958), German film director
- Erik Lund (rugby union) (born 1979), Norway rugby union player
- Erik Lund (footballer) (born 1988), Swedish footballer and manager
- Erik Swane Lund (1923–2012), Danish fencer
