= Lillian Preece =

British swimmer (1928–2004)

Personal information
- Nationality: British (English)
- Born: 1 April 1928 Stockport, England
- Died: July 2004 Harare, Zimbabwe

Sport
- Sport: Swimming
- Strokes: freestyle
- Club: Wallasey
Medal record
Women's swimming
Representing Great Britain
European Championships
Bronze medal – third place	1947 Monte Carlo	4×100 m freestyle
Representing England
British Empire Games
Bronze medal – third place	1950 Auckland	4×110 yd freestyle

Lillian Preece married name Parrington (1 April 1928 – July 2004) was a British swimmer. She competed at the 1948 Summer Olympics and the 1952 Summer Olympics.

== Biography ==
At the 1948 Olympic Games in London, she competed in the 100 metre freestyle and the 4 × 100 metre freestyle relay.

She represented the English team at the 1950 British Empire Games in Auckland, New Zealand, where she won the bronze medal in the 440 Yard freestyle relay.

She won the 1952 ASA National Championship 220 yards freestyle title.

At the 1952 Olympic Games in Helsinki, she competed in three events; the 100 metre freestyle, 400 metre freestyle and the 4 × 100 metre freestyle relay.
