= Evelyn Kawamoto =

American swimmer (1933–2017)

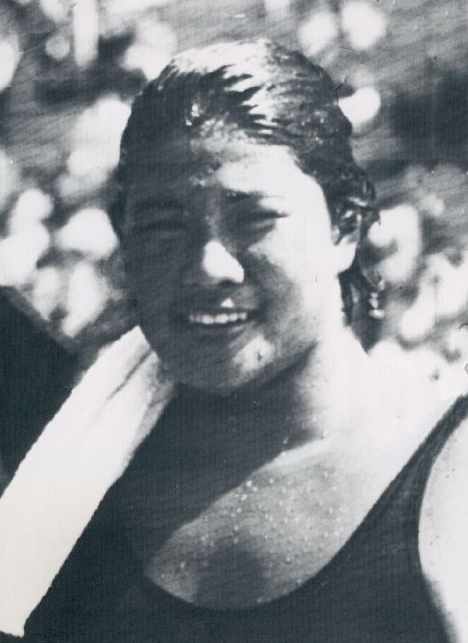
- Kawamoto at the 1952 Olympics

Personal information
- Full name: Evelyn Tokue Kawamoto
- National team: United States
- Born: September 17, 1933 Honolulu, Hawaii
- Died: January 22, 2017 (aged 83) Hawaii, U.S.
- Education: University of Hawaii
- Occupation: Teacher
- Spouse: Ford Konno

Sport
- Sport: Swimming
- Strokes: Freestyle, Medley
- Club: Hawaii Swim Club
- Coach: Soichi Sakamoto (Hawaii Swim Club, '52 Olympics)
Medal record
Representing the United States
Olympic Games
Bronze medal – third place	1952 Helsinki	400 m freestyle
Bronze medal – third place	1952 Helsinki	4×100 m freestyle

Evelyn Tokue Kawamoto (Japanese: 川本 トクエ, September 17, 1933 – January 22, 2017), also known by her married name as Evelyn Konno, was an American competition swimmer, and American record holder, who won bronze medals in the 400-meter individual freestyle and the 4x100-meter freestyle relay events at the 1952 Helsinki Olympics. She set American records in both the 300-meter IM and 200-meter breaststroke in 1949. After graduating the University of Hawaii in her 30's with a degree in Education, she worked as an elementary school teacher.

== Early education and swimming ==
Kawamoto was born on September 17, 1933 in greater Honolulu to mother Sadako Kawamoto, who as a single parent took in laundry and ironing to earn a living for her family. Growing up in Honolulu's McCulley area, Kawamoto trained and competed for the outstanding swim team at Honolulu's McKinley High School, which had also been the training ground for 1952 Olympic gold medalist Bill Woolsey and future husband and fellow 1952 Olympian Ford Konno. By her High School Senior year at McKinley High, she was coached by Tai Hi Lim, recipient of a Masters in Physical Education from Columbia University in 1951. On April 21, 1952, after winning the 220-yard freestyle, and 100-yard breaststroke, and successfully anchoring McKinley's winning 400-yard freestyle relay, Kawamoto led the McKinley team to a championship at the Uluniu Bowl defeating several Honolulu area high school swim teams.

== Hawaii swim club ==
In the late 1940s and early 1950s Kawamoto trained and competed with the Hawaii Swim Club, a highly competitive age group team in Honolulu managed by Hall of Fame Coach Soichi Sakamoto. Kawamoto and the team frequently trained at the University of Hawaii pool, after Sakamoto became the University's Head Coach beginning in 1946. By the age of 13, young Evelyn was training seven days a week for Sakamoto's demanding program. She was one of Sakamoto's earliest and most outstanding young female achievers for the Hawaii Swim Club, after he founded the team in 1946. Kawamoto later said her Coach Sakamoto influenced her to work hard as he sensed her potential as an athlete.

=== National AAU competition ===
As detailed in this section, Kawamoto was a National AAU Champion in the 220-yard or 200-meter breaststroke in 1949 and 1950, and the 300 Individual Medley in 1949 and 1951.

In late August 1949, she helped lead the Hawaii Swim Club to the National AAU Team championship in San Antonio, Texas. In the 330-yard Individual Medley, she broke the American record with a time of 4:27.5, improving on the standing record by 2.4 seconds. Swimming as a 15-year-old in the meet, she also won the 220-yard breaststroke, placed second in the 110-yard breaststroke, and was on the winning 880-yard relay. Another future female Olympian, Thelma Kalama swam with Kawamoto on the Hawaii Swim Club, and Catherine Klienschmidt was a third outstanding team member who won the half mile freestyle event. At the team's annual meet at the University of Hawaii in February 1952, Kawamoto won the 440 and 100-yard freestyle events, with her primary competition coming from her Hawaii Swim Club teammate Joel Leeman.

Kawamoto qualified for the 1948 Olympic trials as a 15-year old at McKinney High, but did not win a berth in the final competition.

The Hawaii swim team also won the 1950 National AAU Championships held in High Point, North Carolina, with Kawamoto excelling in the 200-meter breaststroke, a signature event, where she set a meet record time of 3:10.2, finishing in a tie with Marge Hulton of Portland though she did not match her prior record American time. In the 1951 AAU Championships in Detroit in late July, Kawamoto won the 300-meter individual medley for the third straight year with a time of 4:33, though her time was around 15 seconds behind her standing American record. Kawamoto placed sixth in her signature 200-meter breaststroke event, but placed third in the 800-meter freestyle. Though Kawamoto put in the best performance on her team, the Hawaii Swim Club girls did not win the team championship that year, though they had taken it in the previous two National AAU Championship meets.

== American records ==
In 1949, Kawamoto broke the American record in the 300-meter individual medley (IM) and 200-meter breaststroke on the same day. A month later, she won both events at the US Nationals. On the final day of the 1952 U.S. Women's Olympic Trials, she set the American record in the 400-meter freestyle. Gaining immediate coverage from the New York Times, Kawamoto had first broken the American record for the 400 freestyle in 1948, when she bettered the standing record of her own Hawaii Swim Club teammate and 1948 Olympic gold medalist Thelma Kalama.

== 1952 Olympics ==
=== Olympic trials ===
On July 6, 1952, at the American Olympic trials in Indianapolis, Indiana, Kawamoto won the 400-meter freestyle in the finals, with a new American record time of 5:14.6, finishing first by a margin of more than five seconds. Kawamoto had set the previous American record on July 5, 1951, in Honolulu. She passed the competition after 150 yards, and sprinting to the finish opened a lead of around thirty feet. The time also bettered the standing Olympic record in the event of 5:17.8 but a highly competitive Hungarian team would compete against her at the Olympic finals in Helsinki.

=== Olympic finals ===
Kawamoto represented the United States at the 1952 Summer Olympics in Helsinki, where she earned two bronze medals as an 18-year-old. She received her first bronze in the women's 4×100-meter freestyle relay, when the U.S. team of Jackie LaVine, Marilee Stepan, Jody Alderson and Kawamoto placed third behind the teams from Hungary and the Netherlands. Individually, she set an Olympic record in the 400-meter freestyle in a preliminary heat and received a second bronze for her third-place performance in the women's 400-meter freestyle behind Hungarian swimmers Valéria Gyenge and Éva Novák. In the close 400-meter free event, she finished only .9 seconds behind the second place silver medalist Eva Novak.

=== Marriage ===
She was married on June 9, 1956 at St. Stephens Episcopal Church in Columbus, Ohio near the Ohio State Campus, where her husband-to-be Ford Konno had been a student. The marriage was a double wedding with Canadian swimmer Gerald McNamee, who had been a teammate of Ford Konno at Ohio State. Evelyn had worked as a secretary for Pan American World Airlines in New York, and after a honeymoon in Nassau, the couple planned to return to New York, where Konno would train intensively for the 1956 Olympics. Ford Konno had attended McKinley High with Evelyn, and had been a teammate for the U.S. team at the 1952 Summer Olympics in Helsinki where he won two golds and a silver medal. After their marriage, he would earn a silver medal in the 1956 Summer Olympics.

=== College and career ===
Around 1963 at age 30, despite her own family responsibilities and the time she spent working with her husband's business, Kawamoto returned to the University of Hawaii to earn a degree in education. She had first enrolled at the University of Hawaii around 1952, but her training for the Olympics and swimming career interrupted her studies. After graduating, she would later work as an elementary school teacher in Honolulu County's Kaneohe, and later Wailupe, before her retirement from teaching.

She married U.S. Olympic swimming gold medalist Ford Konno, who was a teammate at the 1952 Summer Olympics in Helsinki where he won two golds and a silver medal, and later swam for a silver medal in the 1956 Summer Olympics. Like Evelyn, Ford attended Honoulu's McKinley High, and was trained by Hall of Fame Coach Soichi Sakamoto with the Hawaii Swim Club.

Evelyn Kawamoto Konno was inducted into the Hawaii Sports Hall of Fame in 2000.

In her retirement from teaching, she was an active volunteer at Holy Trinity Catholic Church in Honolulu. She died on January 22, 2017 in Honolulu at the age of 83, with services held at Diamond Head Mortuary on March 3. She was preceded in death by her daughter Melanie Ofoia, and was survived by a second daughter, Bonnie, and six grandchildren.

== See also ==
- List of Olympic medalists in swimming (women)
