= Carolyn Green =

American swimmer (born 1933)

Personal information
- Full name: Carolyn Virginia Green
- National team: United States
- Born: November 6, 1933 (age 92) Germantown, Pennsylvania, U.S.
- Education: University of Miami ('57, Education)
- Occupations: School teacher, Swim Coach
- Spouse: Alan Graham Lewis (1957)

Sport
- Sport: Swimming
- Strokes: Freestyle
- Club: Fort Lauderdale Swim Assoc. (FLSA)
- Coach: Thomas R. Lamar (High Scl, FLSA); Richard O. Papenguth (Olympics)
Medal record
Women's swimming
Representing the United States
Pan American Games
Gold medal – first place	1951 Buenos Aires	4×100 m freestyle
Gold medal – first place	1955 Mexico City	4×100 m freestyle
Silver medal – second place	1951 Buenos Aires	400 m freestyle
Silver medal – second place	1955 Mexico City	400 m freestyle

Carolyn Virginia Green (born November 6, 1933), also known by her married name Carolyn Virginia Lewis after 1957, is an American former competition swimmer and two-time Pan American Games gold medalist who excelled in distance events and competed for the Fort Lauderdale Swimming Association and Fort Lauderdale High School. As a specialist in freestyle distance events, by the end of her Junior year at Fort Lauderdale High School in August 1951, she was an American record holder in the 500, 800, and 1500-meter freestyle. She participated in the 1956 Helsinki Olympics in the women's 400-meter freestyle, where she qualified for the finals, and placed fourth with a time of 5:16.5, finishing just behind American bronze medalist Evelyn Kawamoto, a former rival, who swam a 5:14.6. In October, 1953, she set a world record of 23:03.4 in the 1980-yard mile. After graduating the University of Miami, where she majored in Education, she married Alan Graham Lewis in Fort Lauderdale.

== High school era swimming ==
Carolyn Green was born November 6, 1933 in Germantown, Pennsylvania to Mr. and Mrs. J. R. Green. After a family move, she attended Fort Lauderdale High School where she competed with the state championship Fort Lauderdale High Swim team, coached by Thomas Reynolds Lamar. Lamar attended the University of Miami, majoring in Education, and founded both the Men's and Women's swim teams there. After coaching at the University of Miami, he moved to Fort Lauderdale, and simultaneously coached swimming at both the Fort Lauderdale Swim Association and Fort Lauderdale High School. Green swam for both with Lamar, and was one of his more promising competitors, benefiting from his long practices and knowledge of technique. She graduated Fort Lauderdale High School in June, 1952, having been named to the All American team in 1950. By August 1951, as a High School Junior, she held American and national records for the 1500-meter freestyle with a National AAU time of 21:20.8 set in Detroit, and would hold the National AAU record for the event in four consecutive years through 1955. She held a national record of 11:15.8 for the 800-meter freestyle. For the 500-meter freestyle she held an American record of 6:42.2.

== Competition highlights ==
In August, 1950, representing the Fort Lauderdale Swim Association, she placed second to Thelma Kalama who swam a 5:30.9 at the Senior Women's National AAU meet in High Point, North Carolina. Green finished only a half-length behind first place finisher Kalama. Improving substantially three years later, at the women's National Championship in Tyler, Texas, on July, 4, 1956, she won one of her signature events, the 1500-meter freestyle for the second year in a row with a time of 21:30.02. Her time was fifteen seconds slower than her national championship time in 1955 of 21:15.4. By early July 1956, she held an American and AAU record in the 400-meter freestyle of 5:14.7, which may have also been a world record.

== 1952 Olympic trials ==
Green qualified for the 1952 Olympics by placing second to Evelyn Kawamoto in the 400-meter freestyle at the U.S. Olympic trials on July 4-6 in Indianapolis, Indiana. Green led in the qualifying heat for the first 100 meters, before she was passed by Kawamoto who finished in an American record time of 5:14.6.

== 1952 Helsinki Olympics ==
Green represented the United States as an 18-year-old Fort Lauderdale High School Senior at the early February 1952 Summer Olympics in Helsinki, Finland, under Head Women's Olympic swim Coach and Hall of Fame inductee Richard O. Papenguth. Papenguth would have a long career coaching Purdue University where he coached a team of Purdue women swimmers at the Lafayette Swim Club. The U.S. women did not dominate swimming at the 1952 Olympics, winning only two bronze medals. On February 8, 1952, she competed in the women's 400-meter freestyle, advanced to the event final, and finished fourth in a time of 5:16.5. Valiria Gyenge of Hungary won the gold medal with a time of 5:12.1, Eva Novak of Hungary won the silver with a time of 5:13.7, and former American rival Evelyn Kawamoto swam a 5:14.6 to take the bronze medal with a time of 5:14.6. For the first 300 meters of the 400 meter race, former world record holder Ragnhild Hveger-Anderson held the lead, but four competittors soon passed her. Hveger-Anderson had been in retirement for seven years, and a 32 lacked the stamina to medal, though she finished the race in a close fifth place with a time of 5:16.9, only .4 seconds behind Green. Green's time of 5:16.5 was only 2 seconds away from contending for the bronze medal.

After completing her journey from Helsinki to the East Coast, she traveled to Florida on the East Coast-Florida ship, The Champion. On August 25, 1952, she arrived by train to Fort Lauderdale. Proclaiming August 25, "Carolyn Green Day" in her honor, she was greeted upon arrival by Fort Lauderdale Vice-Mayor Charles M. White, Fort Lauderdale City Manager, and her parents, and later was part of a congratulatory motorcade followed by a dinner in her honor at the Plantation Golf Club. Fort Lauderdale resident Ensign Jack Calhoun, a 1952 diver for the U.S. Olympic team, was also feted in the welcoming ceremonies.

== University of Miami ==
From around 1952-1956, Green-Lewis attended the University of Miami, where she was a member of the Kappa Kappa Gamma Sorority, a women's social fraternity founded in Illinois in 1870. The University of Miami was the alma mater of her former High School swim Coach Thomas Reynolds Lamar. As Miami had no women's swim team, she continued to swim with private swim clubs during her collegiate years and compete both nationally and internationally. In January 1956, after her elite swimming career was winding down, she was drafted to swim with the Miami men's team in a meet against the University of Florida but was scratched prior to the event. Green graduated the University of Miami in February of 1957, with a Bachelor of Education, anticipating a career in teaching and coaching.

== World Record mile ==
At the Women's National Outdoor Swimming and Diving Championships at the Jantzen Beach Park Pool in Portland, Oregon on October 7, 1953, Green set a world record in the mile swim of 1980 yards. Her time of 23:03.4 was eight seconds faster than the prior record of 23:11.5 set by R. Hueger in 1938. Since the distance was not a standard competitive Olympic distance and the pool was 55-yards, a non-standard length, few contemporary record books or swimming histories contain the record. By 1953, Carolyn was attending the University of Miami, having graduated Fort Lauderdale High School, in June 1952.

== Pan American Games ==
Green swam in two consecutive Pan American Games. At the 1951 Pan American Games in Buenos Aires, Argentina, she won a gold medal as a member of the winning U.S. team in the women's 4×100-meter freestyle relay, together with American teammates Jackie LaVine, Betty Mullen and Sharon Geary. Individually, she received a silver medal for her second-place performance in the women's 400-meter freestyle. Four years later at the 1955 Pan American Games in Mexico City, she again won a gold medal in the women's 4×100-meter freestyle, this time with teammates Judith Roberts, Wanda Werner and Gretchen Gluter. Once again, she also won a silver medal in the women's 400-meter freestyle.

After the Olympics, Green continued to excel primarily in distance freestyle events. In 1954 she set a National record in the 800 freestyle event. She set a national record in the 1,500 meter event in 1951, and another national record in the 1,500 meter event in 1954. In 1954, Green helped her Fort Lauderdale Swim Association team win the 4x200 meter freestyle relay at the National AAU Outdoor Championship.

== Marriage ==
On June 15, 1957, Green married Alan Graham Lewis at Fort Lauderdale's Park Temple Methodist Church. Lewis anticipated studying for a Doctorate at the University of Miami in Marine Biology, having already completed a Masters there. The couple, who had met as upperclassmen at Miami, planned to reside in Hollywood, Florida after a trip to Nassau. After returning to Florida, Carolyn would work as a Junior High School physical education teacher and swim coach at Sunrise Junior High School in the Fall of 1957.

== Careers ==
As noted, Green worked as a Junior High School teacher and swim coach in greater Fort Lauderdale. She was selected to serve as the head swimming coach for the Fort Lauderdale Swimming Association (FLSA) in the Fall of 1957, and coached intermittently in later years while raising a family. She was selected to coach the Jr. Olympic swimming program as part of FLSA in the summer of 1957. In 1960, she planned to coach swimming in Honolulu and announced the birth of a daughter there.

== Honors ==
In May 1957, Green was honored as an inductee to the Helms Athletic Foundation Swimming Hall of Fame.
