= Raili Riuttala =

Finnish swimmer (1933–2024)

Personal information
- Birth name: Raili Anita Hillevi Riuttala
- Full name: Raili Anita Hillevi Laiho
- Nickname: Pimu
- National team: Finland
- Born: 23 October 1933; Ulvila, Finland
- Died: 9 March 2024 (aged 90); Pori, Finland
- Height: 160 cm (5 ft 3 in)

Sport
- Sport: Swimming
- Strokes: Freestyle
- Club: Porin Pyrintö

Raili Anita Hillevi Laiho (née Riuttala, 23 October 1933 – 9 March 2024) was a Finnish competitive swimmer. She represented Finland in the women's 100 metre freestyle and women's 4 × 100 metre freestyle relay at the 1952 Summer Olympics in Helsinki. Riuttala died in Pori on 9 March 2024, at the age of 90.
