= Gerda Olsen =

Danish swimmer

Personal information
- Born: 12 June 1932 (age 94) Copenhagen, Denmark

Sport
- Sport: Swimming
Medal record
Women's swimming
Representing Denmark
European Championships
Silver medal – second place	1950 Vienna	4×100 m freestyle

Gerda Olsen (born 12 June 1932) is a Danish former swimmer. She competed in the women's 400 metre freestyle at the 1952 Summer Olympics.
