= Nicole Guilini =

Belgian swimmer

Personal information
- Born: 22 September 1936 (age 89) Bruges, Belgium

Sport
- Sport: Swimming

Nicole Guilini (born 22 September 1936) is a Belgian former freestyle swimmer. She competed in the women's 4 × 100 metre freestyle relay at the 1952 Summer Olympics.
