= Maryse Morandini =

French swimmer (1932–2018)

Personal information
- Born: 28 December 1932
- Died: 12 November 2018 (aged 85)

Sport
- Sport: Swimming

Maryse Morandini (28 December 1932 – 12 November 2018) was a French swimmer. She competed in the women's 4 × 100 metre freestyle relay at the 1952 Summer Olympics.
