= Fides Benini =

Italian swimmer

Personal information
- Born: 9 September 1929 Trieste, Italy
- Died: 11 April 1993 (aged 63)

Sport
- Sport: Swimming

Fides Benini (9 September 1929 – 11 April 1993) was an Italian swimmer. She competed in the women's 4 × 100 metre freestyle relay at the 1952 Summer Olympics.
