= Yasuko Oishi =

Japanese swimmer

Personal information
- Born: 15 October 1931

Sport
- Sport: Swimming
- Strokes: freestyle

Yasuko Oishi (大石 康子, Ōishi Yasuko; born 15 October 1931) is a Japanese former swimmer. She competed in the women's 4 × 100 metre freestyle relay at the 1952 Summer Olympics.
