= Irène Possemiers =

Belgian swimmer

Personal information
- Born: 28 May 1934 (age 92) Antwerp, Belgium

Sport
- Sport: Swimming

Irène Possemiers (born 28 May 1934) is a Belgian former swimmer. She competed in the women's 4 × 100 metre freestyle relay at the 1952 Summer Olympics.
