= Marianne Erismann =

Swiss swimmer

Personal information
- Full name: Marianne Erismann
- Born: 14 July 1930
- Died: 12 June 2004 (aged 73)

Sport
- Sport: Swimming

Marianne Erismann (14 July 1930 – 12 June 2004) was a Swiss swimmer. She competed in the women's 100 metre freestyle at the 1948 Summer Olympics.
