= Rita Larsen =

Danish swimmer (born 1935)

Personal information
- Born: 12 September 1935 (age 90) Copenhagen, Denmark

Sport
- Sport: Swimming
- Club: P08, København

Rita Larsen (born 12 September 1935) is a Danish retired freestyle swimmer. She competed at the 1952 Summer Olympics and finished fourth in the 4 × 100 m freestyle relay, together with Mette Ove-Petersen, Greta Andersen and Ragnhild Hveger.
