= Susy Vaterlaus =

Swiss swimmer

Personal information
- Born: 26 July 1932 (age 94)

Sport
- Sport: Swimming

Susy Vaterlaus (born 26 July 1932) is a Swiss former freestyle swimmer. She competed in the women's 100 metre freestyle at the 1952 Summer Olympics.
