= Eva Belaise =

Italian swimmer

Personal information
- Born: 15 January 1927 Trento, Italy
- Died: 28 June 2008 (aged 81)

Sport
- Sport: Swimming

Eva Belaise (15 January 1927 – 28 June 2008) was an Italian swimmer. She competed in the women's 4 × 100 metre freestyle relay at the 1952 Summer Olympics.
