= Angela Barnwell =

British swimmer

Personal information
- Full name: Angela Mary Barnwell
- Born: 11 January 1936 Worthing, England
- Died: 29 June 1965 (aged 29) London, England

Sport
- Sport: Swimming

Angela Mary Barnwell (11 January 1936 – 29 June 1965) was a British swimmer. She competed in two events at the 1952 Summer Olympics. She won the 1952 ASA National Championship 100 metres freestyle title.

She died from cancer, aged 29.
