= Misako Tamura =

Japanese swimmer (born 1934)

Personal information
- Born: 8 April 1934 (age 92)

Sport
- Sport: Swimming
- Strokes: Freestyle
Medal record
Women's swimming
Representing Japan
Asian Games
Gold medal – first place	1954 Manila	400 m freestyle
Gold medal – first place	1954 Manila	4×100 m freestyle

Misako Tamura (田村 美佐子, Tamura Misako; born 8 April 1934) is a Japanese former freestyle swimmer. She competed in two events at the 1952 Summer Olympics.
