= Svend Nielsen (footballer) =

Danish footballer (1928–2005)

Personal information
- Date of birth: 20 November 1928
- Date of death: 25 May 2005 (aged 76)
- Position: Defender

Senior career*
Years	Team	Apps	(Gls)
- B.93
- * Club domestic league appearances and goals

Svend Nielsen (20 November 1928 – 25 May 2005) was a Danish footballer who competed in the 1952 Summer Olympics. He also played in ten matches for the Denmark national football team from 1950 to 1952.
