= Jackie LaVine =

American swimmer (1929–2022)

Jacqueline LaVine
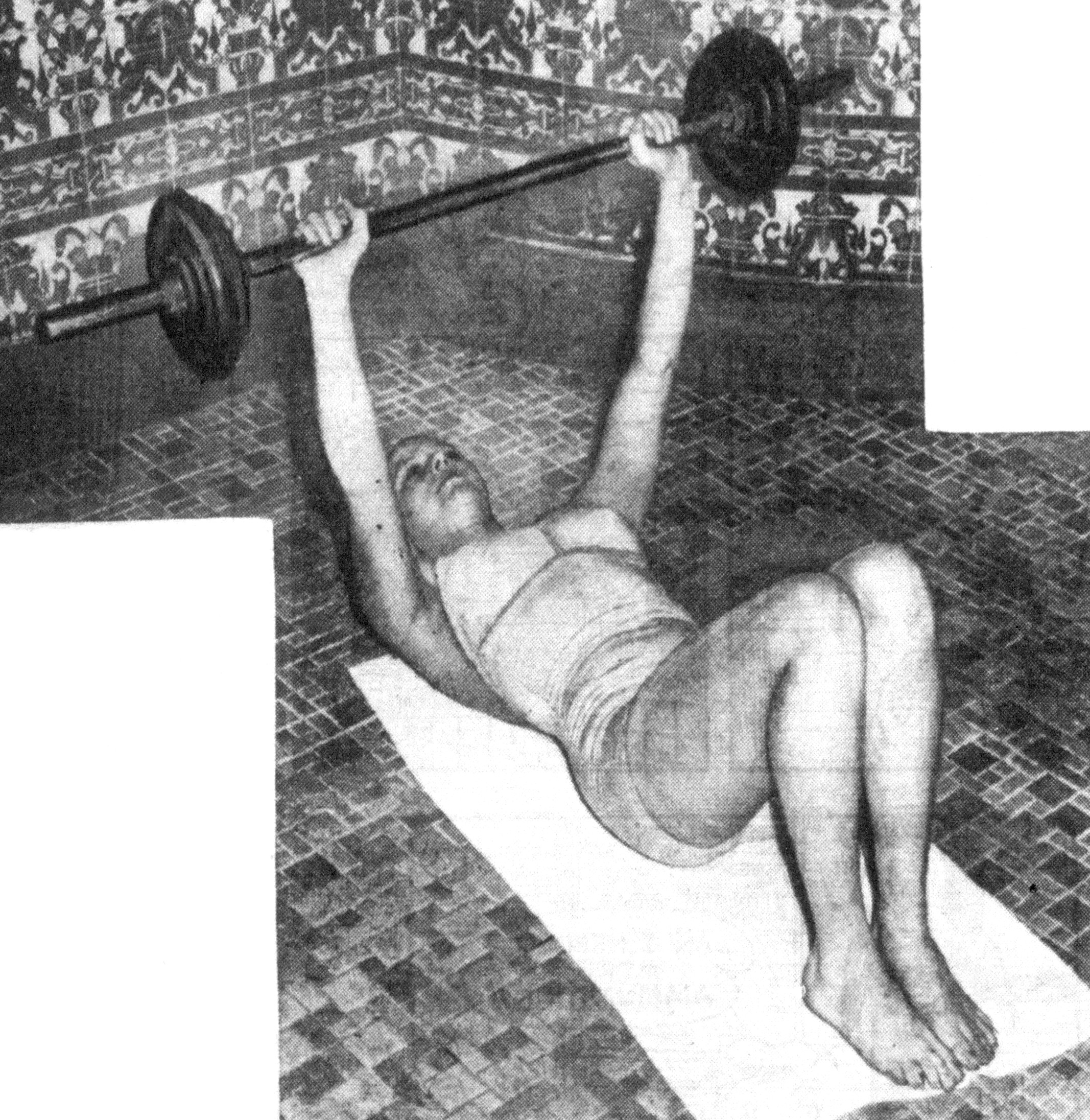
- Lavine, circa 1950

Personal information
- Full name: Jacqueline Carol LaVine -Collins
- Nickname: "Jackie"
- National team: United States
- Born: October 4, 1929 Maywood, Illinois, U.S.
- Died: October 21, 2022 (aged 93) Arlington Heights, Illinois, U.S.
- Height: 5 ft 9 in (1.75 m)
- Weight: 128 lb (58 kg)

Sport
- Sport: Swimming
- Strokes: Freestyle
- Club: Chicago Town Club
- Coach: Walter Schlueter (Chicago Town Club)
Medal record
Women's swimming
Representing the United States
Olympic Games
Bronze medal – third place	1952 Helsinki	4x100 m freestyle
Pan American Games
Gold medal – first place	1951 Buenos Aires	4x100 m freestyle
Silver medal – second place	1951 Buenos Aires	100 m freestyle

Jacqueline Carol LaVine (October 4, 1929 – October 21, 2022) was an American competition swimmer and Olympic medalist.

Jacqueline Carol LaVine was born into a family with nine other siblings on October 4, 1929 in Evergreen Park, in Maywood, Illinois to John and Laura (Snyder) LaVine. She learned to swim at 5, and began to receive formal training at 16 at Chicago's Town Club Swimming team. She attended Morgan Park High School, and though she had started as a diver, she switched to swimming after a diving injury. Training under the Town Club's Head Coach Walter Schlueter, she quickly gained recognition as a talented sprinter, excelling in short and mid-range freestyle swimming events. Achieving early, in 1946 she placed second in the Junior Central AAU 50-yard swim, and captured a first at the Junior Central AAU 220-yard swim.

== 1951 Pan Am Games ==
LaVine won her first medal in international competition, a gold, at the 1951 Pan American Games in Buenos Aires, Argentina. She was a member of the winning U.S. team in the women's 4×100-meter freestyle relay which included teammates Carolyn Green, Betty Mullen and Sharon Geary. Individually, she also won a silver medal for her second-place finish in the women's 100-meter freestyle.

== Olympics ==
In 1948, she had a fifth place finish in the 100m freestyle at the U.S. Olympic Trial finals in Detroit, Michigan, and travelled to London as an alternate to the relay team. She was unable to compete in the 1948 London Summer Olympics, however.

LaVine represented the United States at the 1952 Summer Olympics in Helsinki, Finland. She received a bronze medal as a member of the third-place U.S. team in women's 4×100-meter freestyle relay, together with American teammates Marilee Stepan, Jody Alderson and Evelyn Kawamoto.

LaVine died on October 21, 2022, at the age of 93.

== See also ==
- List of Olympic medalists in swimming (women)
