= Huguette Peeters =

Belgian swimmer

Personal information
- Born: 27 November 1936 (age 89)

Sport
- Sport: Swimming

Huguette Peeters (born 27 November 1936) is a Belgian former freestyle swimmer. She competed in two events at the 1952 Summer Olympics.
