= Grethe Andersen =

Norwegian politician

Grethe Andersen (born 8 March 1966) is a Norwegian politician for the Progress Party.

In the 2017 election she was elected as a deputy representative to the Parliament of Norway from Nordland. Hailing from Meløy Municipality, she made her local breakthrough as board member of Nordland Progress Party in 2010.
