= Fumiko Sakaguchi =

Japanese swimmer

Personal information
- Born: 27 April 1934 (age 92)

Sport
- Sport: Swimming

Fumiko Sakaguchi (坂口 文子, Sakaguchi Fumiko; born 27 April 1934) is a Japanese former swimmer. She competed in two events at the 1952 Summer Olympics.
