= Maria Nardi =

Italian swimmer

Personal information
- Born: 15 January 1935 (age 91) Ravenna, Italy

Sport
- Sport: Swimming

Maria Nardi (born 15 January 1935) is an Italian former freestyle swimmer. She competed in two events at the 1952 Summer Olympics.
