= Jakob Lyng =

Danish fencer (1907–1995)

Personal information
- Born: 1 April 1907 Søndbjerg, Denmark
- Died: 27 May 1995 (aged 88) Midtjylland, Denmark

Sport
- Sport: Fencing

Jakob Lyng (1 April 1907 – 27 May 1995) was a Danish fencer. He competed at the 1948 and 1952 Summer Olympics.
