= Anita Andersson =

Swedish swimmer

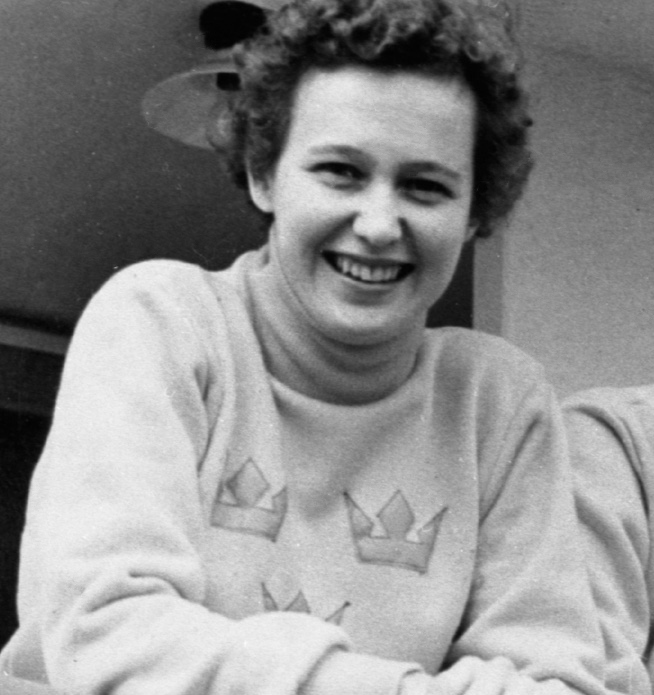
- Anita Andersson, circa 1952

Personal information
- Born: 20 May 1935 (age 91) Gothenburg, Sweden

Sport
- Sport: Swimming
- Strokes: Freestyle
- Club: SK Najaden, Göteborg

Marion Anita Andersson (later Odell, born 20 May 1935) is a retired Swedish freestyle swimmer. She was part of the 4 × 100 m relay team that finished sixth at the 1952 Summer Olympics.
