= Marilee Stepan =

American swimmer (1935–2021)

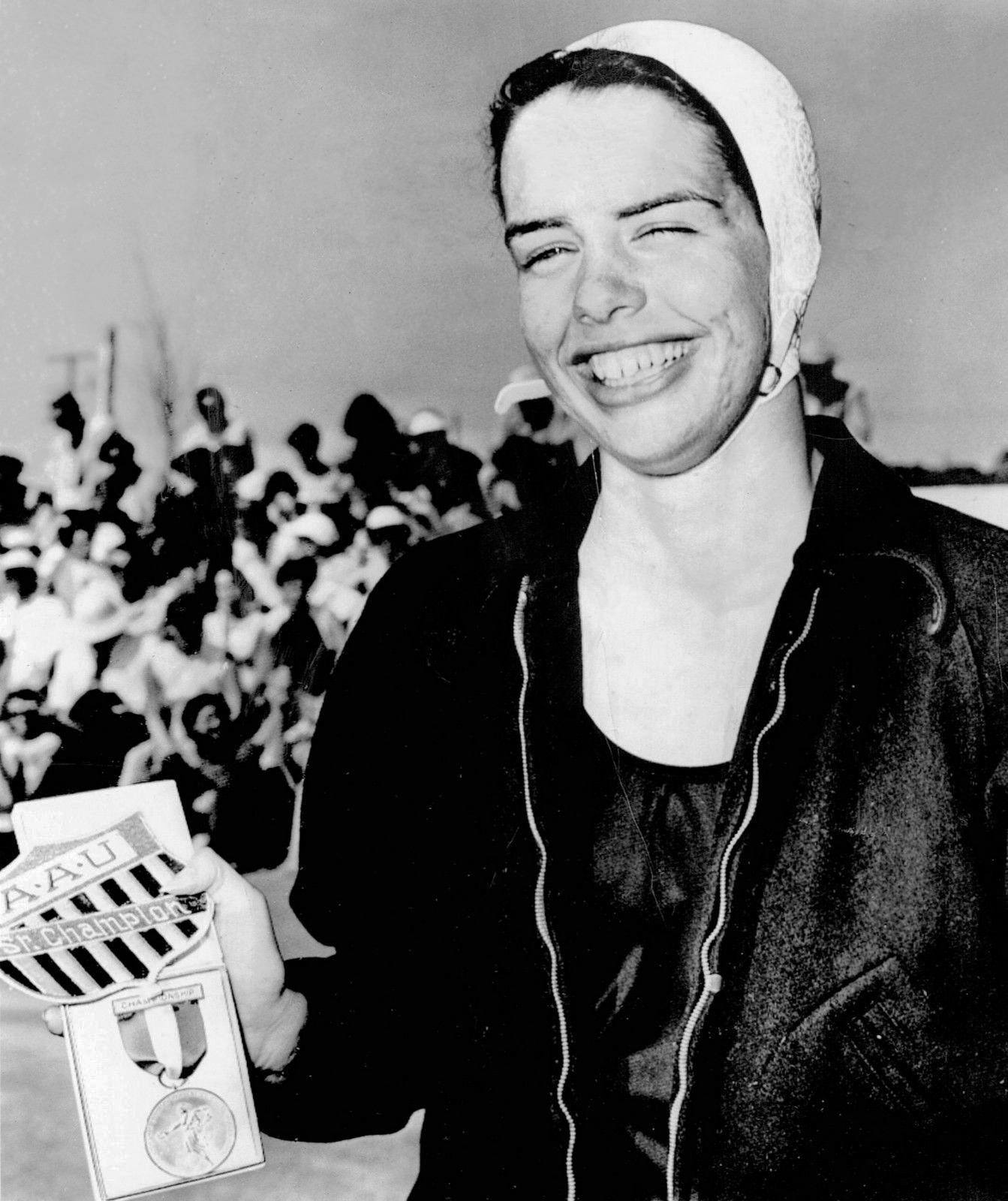
- Stepan in 1952

Personal information
- Full name: Mary Louise Stepan
- Nickname: "Marilee"
- National team: United States
- Born: February 2, 1935 Chicago, Illinois, U.S.
- Died: December 15, 2021 (aged 86) Winnetka, Illinois, U.S.
- Education: Barat College of the Sacred Heart
- Occupations: Producer WTTW television station Philanthropist, Arts, Education
- Spouse: Richard Halley Wehman
- Children: 4

Sport
- Sport: Swimming
- Strokes: Freestyle
- Club: Lake Shore Athletic Club
Medal record
Representing the United States
Olympic Games
Bronze medal – third place	1952 Helsinki	4×100 m freestyle

Mary Louise "Marilee" Stepan (February 2, 1935 – December 15, 2021), also known by her married name Marilee Stepan Wehman, was an American competition swimmer who trained for Chicago's Lakeshore Athletic Club and won a bronze medal at the 1952 Helsinki Olympics in the 4x100 meter freestyle relay. After the Olympics, she attended Barat College of the Sacred Heart, and was a producer at the Chicago area PBS television station WTTW. For many years, she was an arts and education philanthropist in the Chicago area, particularly active with the Lyric Opera of Chicago.

== Early life ==
Mary Stepan was born February 2, 1935, the oldest of seven children to Alfred Charles Stepan, Jr. and Mary Louise Quinn Stepan in Chicago, Illinois. She would live most of her life in the Chicago suburb of Winetka. Stepan's father, Alfred, who started the Stepan Company, a Northfield, Illinois specialty chemical business, was well known among Chicago philanthropists. By 1961, Alfred Stepan would serve as President of Chicago's Lyric Opera Board, and was one of the Board's founding members. Also active in educational philanthropies, Marilee's mother Mary Stepan and her father Alfred, endowed the student activities building, the Stepan Center, at the University of Notre Dame in 1962. From an athletic family, in the 1920's Marilee's mother Mary Louise was a national swimming champion in freestyle. In June, 1926, Marilee's mother Mary Louise Quinn, won the 100 meter event in a meet in Chicago in a time of 1:11.6, beating the time of Olympic champion Ethel Lackie.

=== Early swimming ===
Stepan swam for Chicago's Lake Shore Swim Club. She attended Woodlands Academy of the Sacred Heart, a private Roman Catholic girls' school in Lake Forest, Illinois, just 12 miles North of Winetka, and occasionally represented the school in meets. As Sacred Heart High School had no swimming pool, Stepan did her training with the highly competitive Lake Shore Swim Club, usually training with male swimmers.

At the Catholic Youth Organization swimming meet on August 12, 1950, at 15, she won the 100-meter freestyle with a time of 1:13.1, helping her Lakeshore Atletic Club to take the team championship. She won the 300-meter IM with a time of 5:14.4, and was on the winning 4x100 meter freestyle relay team that recorded a combined time of 5:40.1. In April, 1951, Stepan placed second in the 200-yard event with a 2:16.6 at the National AAU Women's Swimming Championship at the Shamrock Hotel in Houston, Texas.

=== American record ===
Stepan held an American record in the 200-yard freestyle, and earned honors as a National Champion in the early years of 1950. In the early 1950's a Chicago Tribune article listed Stepan as third in the nation in the 100-yard freestyle.

At the early July, 1952 Olympic trials in Indianapolis, Indiana, Stepan placed third in the trial finals of the 100-meter freestyle, and also swam on the winning 4x100 meter freestyle relay team.

== 1952 Helsinki Olympic bronze medal ==
As a 17-year-old, in early August of the summer before her High School Senior year at Woodlands Academy of the Sacred Heart, Stepan represented the United States at the 1952 Summer Olympics in Helsinki. She received a bronze medal as a member of the third-place U.S. team in the finals of the Women's 4×100-meter freestyle relay, together with teammates Jackie LaVine, Jody Alderson and Evelyn Kawamoto. Stepan's bronze medal team swam a combined time of 4:30.1, second behind the silver medal team from the Netherlands, and just under 6 seconds behind the gold medal team from Hungary, which recorded a combined time in the finals of 4:24.4. In the 1952 Olympics, Stepan received some training and tips from U.S. Olympic Women's Head Coach Dick Papenguth, a former swimmer for Michigan who did his collegiate competition under Hall of Fame Coach Matt Mann.

Stepan also competed in the women's 100-meter freestyle, advanced to the event final, and finished seventh overall with a time of 1:08.0. Hungary dominated the women's swimming competition that year, winning four of five events staged for women.

=== Marriage ===
On the morning of June 18, 1955, Stepan married Richard Halley Wehman while she was a student at Lake Forest's Barat College of the Sacred Heart, a small Catholic college in Lake Forest, Illinois. The wedding was held at Faith, Hope, and Charity Church in Winetka, North of Chicago. At the time, Stepan's husband Richard Wehman was at graduate school at Loyola College, and planning to complete army service at Fort Bliss while the couple lived in El Paso, Texas. Marilee and Richard would eventually have four children, and live most of their lives in the greater Chicago area.

=== Post swimming pursuits ===
In a primary career, Stepan served as a producer at Chicago's PBS television station WTTW. In tribute to the swimming community, she was on the US Olympic Committee board beginning in the late 70's and spanning into the early 80's, and was one of the first women as a prior Olympic athlete, to take such a strong role with the committee. Supporting the arts, she served on the Chicago Arts and Culture Advisory Council. In educational philanthropy, she was a Cristo Rey Jesuit High School of Chicago trustee and a founding trustee beginning when the school opened in 1996. Stepan also served on Northwestern University's women's board, and was the creator of the Marilee Prize which provided a scholarship to economically disadvantaged women athletes at the University of Chicago. For five decades, she was a long-serving member of Chicago's Lyric Women's Board. For just over three decades, she was a Trustee of the Lyric Ryan Opera Center. She also served with Highland Park's Ravinia Festival as a Trustee.

Stepan died at her home in Winnetka, Illinois, a Chicago suburb, of natural causes on December 15, 2021, at the age of 86. She was survived by her husband Richard, three daughters, and ten grandchildren. She had lived sixty-three years of her life in the Winnetka area. Visitation was held on December 17 at Divine Mercy Parish at Sacred Heart Church in her native Winetka, Illinois, and she was buried at Sacred Heart Cemetery in Northbrook, Illinois.

=== Honors ===
Stepan was inducted into the Chicagoland Sports Hall of Fame as Marilee Stepan Wehman in 1997.

== See also ==
- List of Olympic medalists in swimming (women)
