= Gaby Tanguy =

French swimmer

Personal information
- Born: 16 July 1929
- Died: 31 January 1981 (aged 51)

Sport
- Sport: Swimming

Gaby Tanguy (16 July 1929 – 31 January 1981) was a French freestyle swimmer. She competed in three events at the 1952 Summer Olympics.
