= Marie-Louise Linssen-Vaessen =

Dutch swimmer (1928–1993)

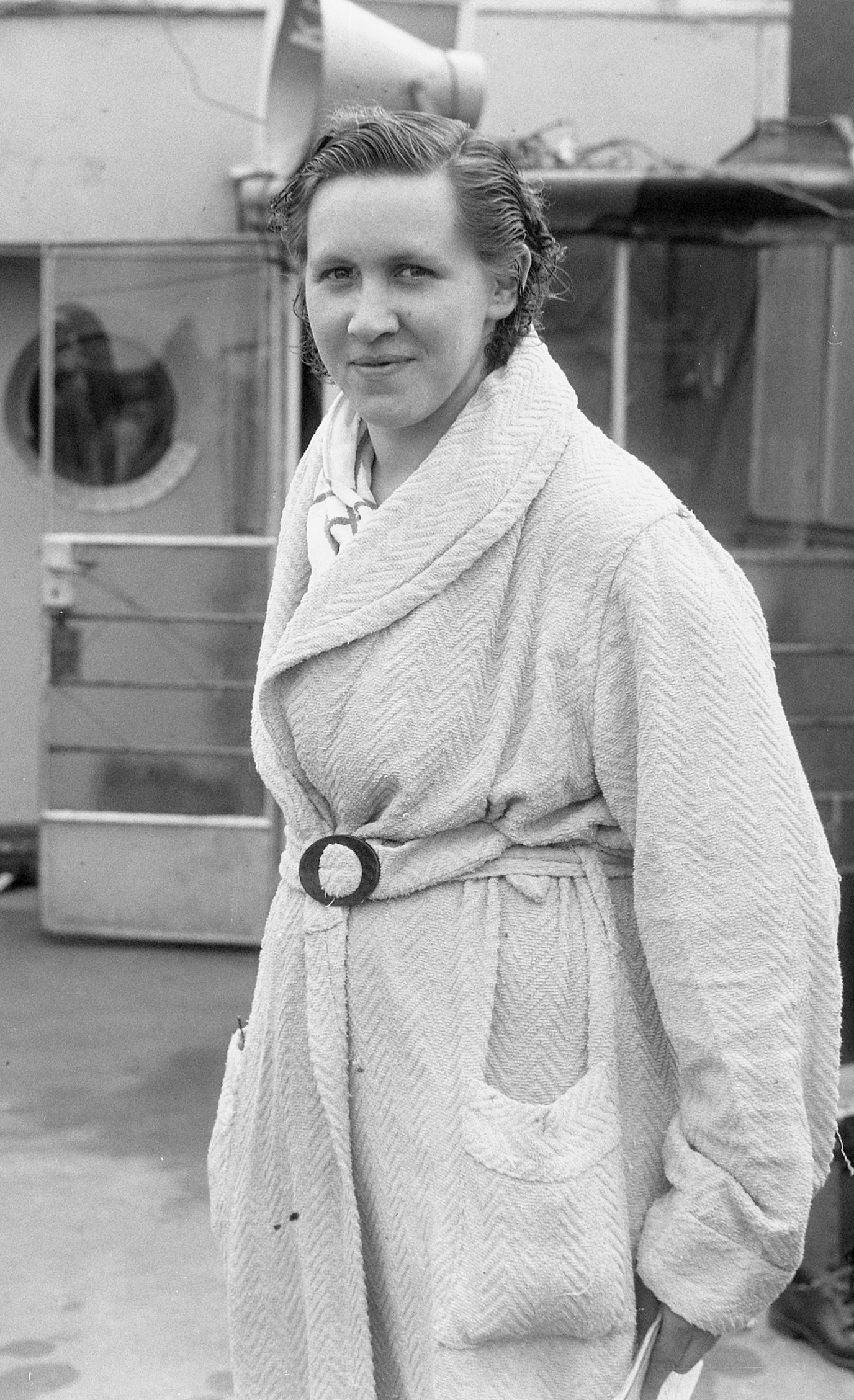
- Linssen-Vaessen in 1952

Personal information
- Full name: Marie-Louise Jean Joséphine Linssen-Vaessen
- Born: 19 March 1928 Maastricht, the Netherlands
- Died: 15 February 1993 (aged 64) Horst, the Netherlands

Sport
- Sport: Swimming
- Club: ZON, Heerlen
Medal record
Representing Netherlands
Olympic Games
Bronze medal – third place	1948 London	100 m freestyle
Bronze medal – third place	1948 London	4×100 m freestyle
Silver medal – second place	1952 Helsinki	4×100 m freestyle
European Championships
Silver medal – second place	1947 Monte Carlo	4×100 m freestyle
Gold medal – first place	1950 Vienna	4×100 m freestyle
Silver medal – second place	1950 Vienna	100 m freestyle

Marie-Louise Jean Joséphine Linssen-Vaessen (19 March 1928 – 15 February 1993) was a freestyle swimmer from the Netherlands. She competed at the 1948 and 1952 Olympics and won one silver and two bronze medals in the 100 m and 4 × 100 m events. She won three European medals in these events in 1947–1950.
