= Sybille Verckist =

Belgian swimmer

Personal information
- Born: 16 December 1934 Antwerp, Belgium
- Died: 26 August 2013 (aged 78)

Sport
- Sport: Swimming

Sybille Verckist (16 December 1934 – 26 August 2013) was a Belgian freestyle swimmer. She competed in three events at the 1952 Summer Olympics.
