= Ritva Järvinen =

Finnish swimmer

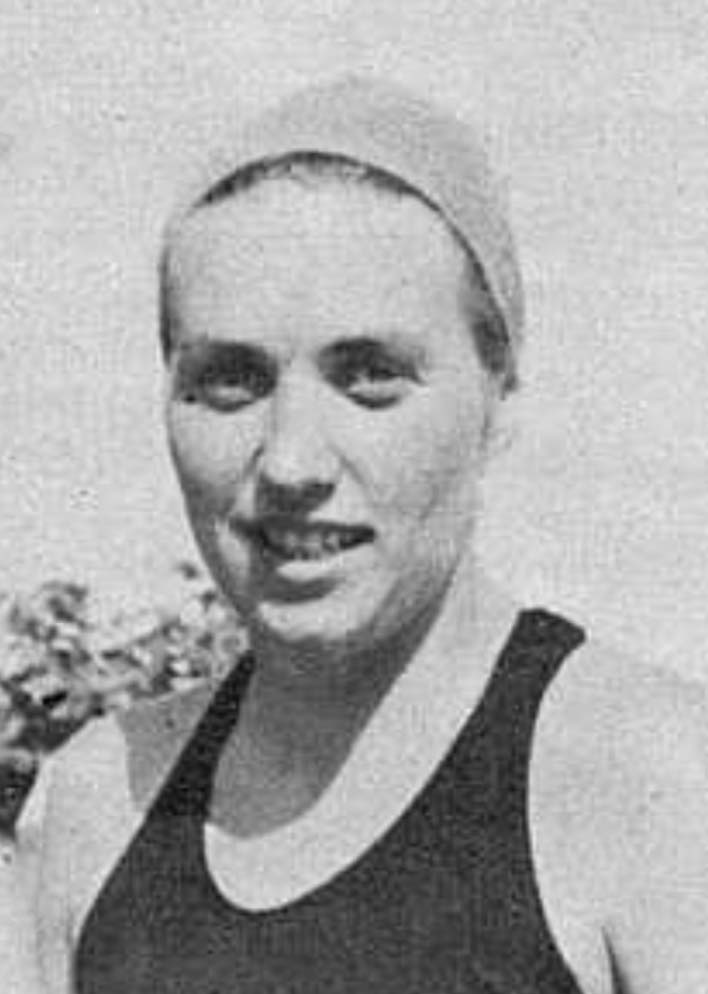

Personal information
- Born: 2 August 1932 (age 94) Helsinki, Finland

Sport
- Sport: Swimming

Ritva Järvinen (born 2 August 1932) is a Finnish former freestyle swimmer. She competed in three events at the 1952 Summer Olympics.
