= Sadako Yamashita =

Japanese swimmer (born 1932)

Personal information
- Born: 5 November 1932
- Died: before 2016

Sport
- Sport: Swimming
- Strokes: freestyle
Medal record
Representing Japan
Asian Games
Gold medal – first place	1954 Manila	4x100m freestyle relay

Sadako Yamashita (山下 貞子, Yamashita Sadako; 5 November 1932 – before 2016) was a Japanese freestyle swimmer. She competed in three events at the 1952 Summer Olympics. Yamashita died before 2016.
