= Maud Berglund =

Swedish swimmer

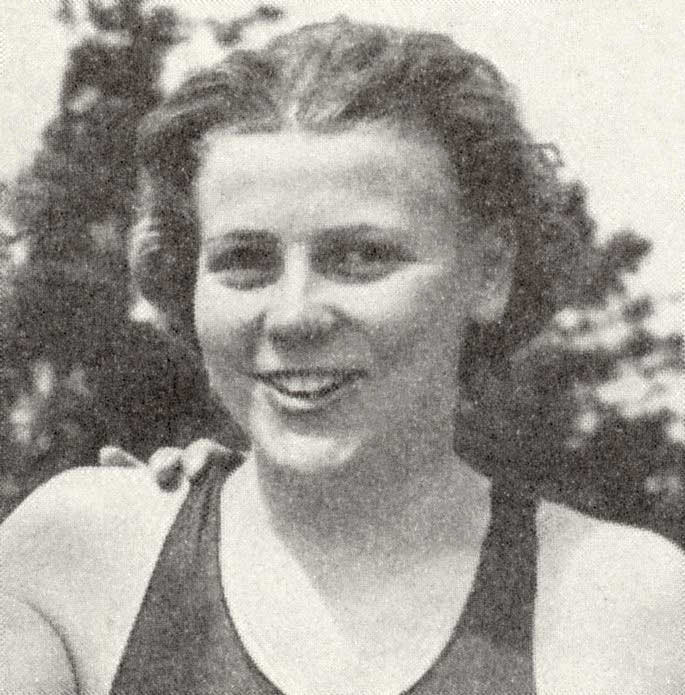

Personal information
- Born: 9 March 1934 Stockholm, Sweden
- Died: 1 June 2000 (aged 66) Stockholm, Sweden

Sport
- Sport: Swimming
- Strokes: Freestyle
- Club: SK Neptun, Stockholm

Maud Karin Berglund (later Svensson, 9 March 1934 – 1 June 2000) was a Swedish freestyle swimmer. She was part of the 4 × 100 m relay team that finished sixth at the 1952 Summer Olympics. She also competed in the individual 100 m event, but failed to reach the final.
