= Katalin Szőke =

Hungarian swimmer (1935–2017)

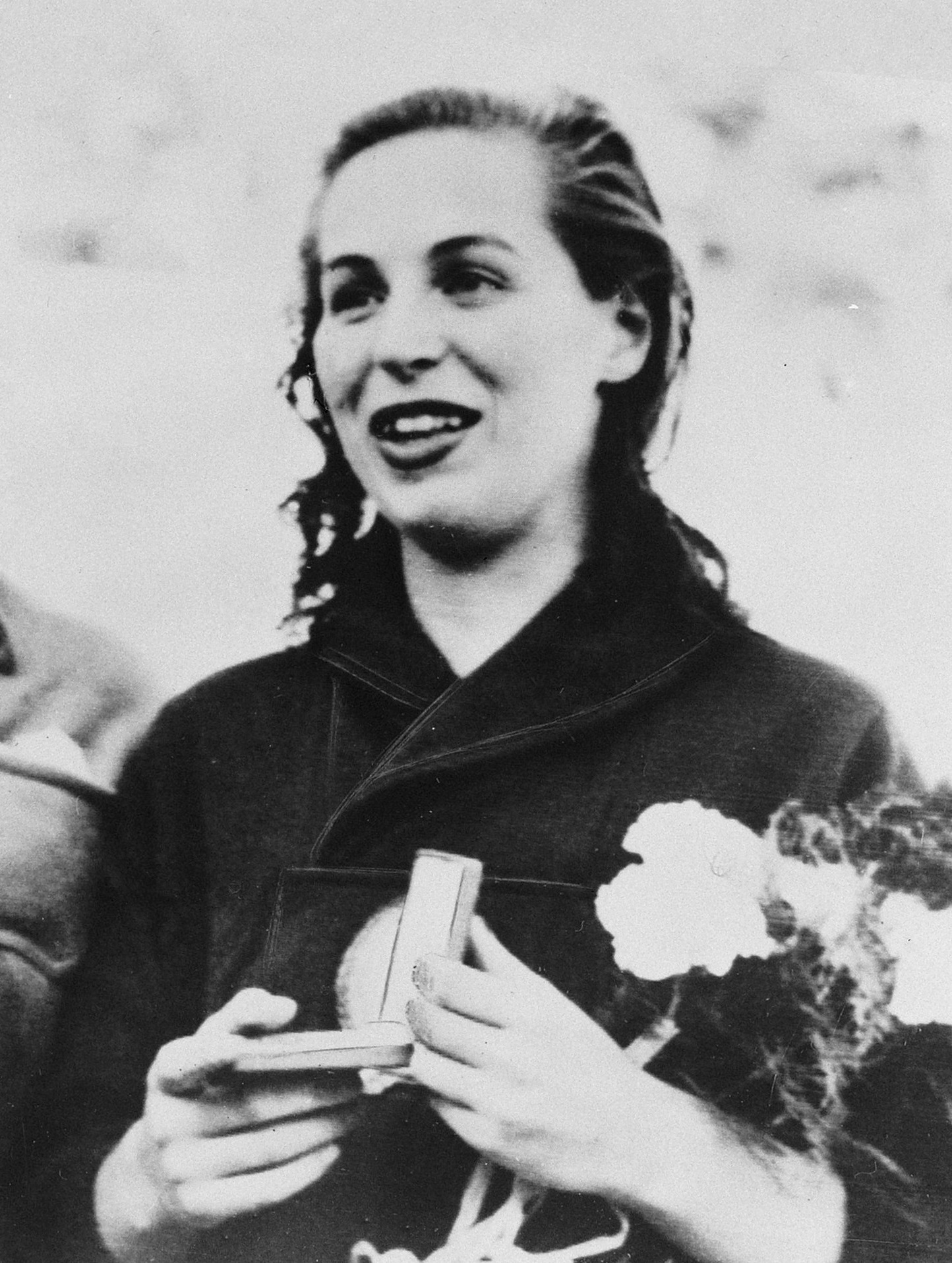
- Katalin Szőke in 1952

Personal information
- Full name: Katalin Szőke-Markovits
- Nationality: Hungary
- Born: 17 August 1935 Budapest, Hungary
- Died: 27 October 2017 (aged 82) Los Angeles, California, U.S.

Sport
- Sport: Swimming
- Strokes: Freestyle
- Club: Budapesti Kinizsi
- Coach: Imre Sarosi, Steffen Hunyadfi
Medal record
Women's swimming
Representing Hungary
Olympic Games
Gold medal – first place	1952 Helsinki	100 m freestyle
Gold medal – first place	1952 Helsinki	4×100 m freestyle
European Championships
Gold medal – first place	1954 Turin	100 m freestyle
Gold medal – first place	1954 Turin	4×100 m freestyle

Katalin Szőke (17 August 1935 – 27 October 2017) was a Hungarian swimmer. She competed at the 1952 Olympics and won two gold medals, in the 100 m and 4 × 100 m freestyle events. Two years later she repeated that success at the 1954 European Championships. She also competed in these two events at the 1956 Olympics but without success. During her career Szőke set four world records. In 1985 she was inducted into the International Swimming Hall of Fame.

== Biography ==
Szőke was born in Budapest to Márton Homonnai, an Olympic champion in water polo in 1932 and 1936. During World War II, her father was a policeman and a member of the Arrow Cross Party, which supported the Nazis. After the war, fearing prosecution (he was sentenced to death in absentia), he flew via Germany and Brazil to Argentina, where he died in 1969. Meanwhile, his daughter remained in Hungary and took her mother's name to hide relationship with her father. In 1956, due to the Soviet intervention in Hungary, she immigrated to the United States. She married an Olympic water polo player Kálmán Markovits, but later divorced him and married his teammate, Árpád Domján. They settled in Los Angeles, where she worked at a bank and did some modelling, while her husband built a successful career in developing office buildings and living apartments. They both adopted a last name of Domyan, and raised a son, Bryan Domyan, who became a basketball player.

== See also ==
- List of members of the International Swimming Hall of Fame
