= Elisabeth Rechlin =

German swimmer (1930–2021)

Personal information
- Born: 24 March 1930 Bochum, Germany
- Died: 26 May 2021 (aged 91) Hannover, Germany

Sport
- Sport: Swimming
- Club: Blau-Weiß Bochum
Medal record
Women's swimming
Representing West Germany
European Championships
Bronze medal – third place	1954 Turin	4×100 m freestyle

Elisabeth Rechlin (24 March 1930 – 26 May 2021) was a German swimmer who won a bronze medal at the 1954 European Aquatics Championships. She competed at the 1952 Summer Olympics in the 100 m, 400 m and 4 × 100 m freestyle events and finished seventh in the relay. She won four national titles in the 100 m and 400 m freestyle in 1951 and 1952. Her husband, Wilfried Bode (1929–2012), was a water polo player who competed in the 1952 and 1956 Olympics. She died on 26 May 2021, at the age of 91.
