= Éva Novák-Gerard =

Hungarian swimmer (1930–2005)

Éva Novák
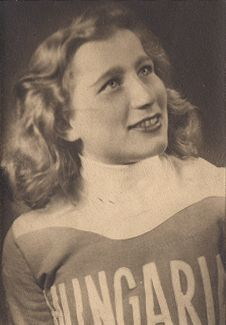

Personal information
- Full name: Éva Novák-Gerard
- Nationality: Hungary
- Born: 8 January 1930 Budapest, Hungary
- Died: 30 June 2005 (aged 75) Brussels, Belgium

Sport
- Sport: Swimming
- Strokes: Freestyle and breaststroke
- Club: Ferencvárosi Torna Club; Budapesti Kinizsi
Medal record
Women's swimming
Representing Hungary
Olympic Games
Gold medal – first place	1952 Helsinki	4×100 m freestyle
Silver medal – second place	1952 Helsinki	200 m breaststroke
Silver medal – second place	1952 Helsinki	400 m freestyle
Bronze medal – third place	1948 London	200 m breaststroke

Éva Novák (8 January 1930 – 30 June 2005), also known as Éva Novák-Gérard, was a swimmer from Hungary. She won three medals at the 1952 Summer Olympics in Helsinki, after a bronze four years earlier in London.

She was inducted into the International Swimming Hall of Fame in Fort Lauderdale, Florida in 1973, together with her sister, Ilona Novák.

== See also ==
- List of members of the International Swimming Hall of Fame
- List of Olympic medalist families

Records
Preceded by (Netherlands) Nel van Vliet	Women's 200 metres Breaststroke world record holder (long course); October 21, 1950 – November 13, 1956	Succeeded by (Netherlands) Ada den Haan
