= Irene Strong =

Canadian swimmer

Personal information
- Born: 3 March 1929
- Died: 20 February 2018 (aged 88) Cayman Islands

Sport
- Sport: Swimming

Irene Marie Watler (née Strong; 3 March 1929 – 20 February 2018) was a Canadian competitive swimmer from Surrey, British Columbia. She competed at the 1948 Summer Olympics and the 1952 Summer Olympics.
