= Ilona Novák =

Hungarian swimmer (1925–2019)

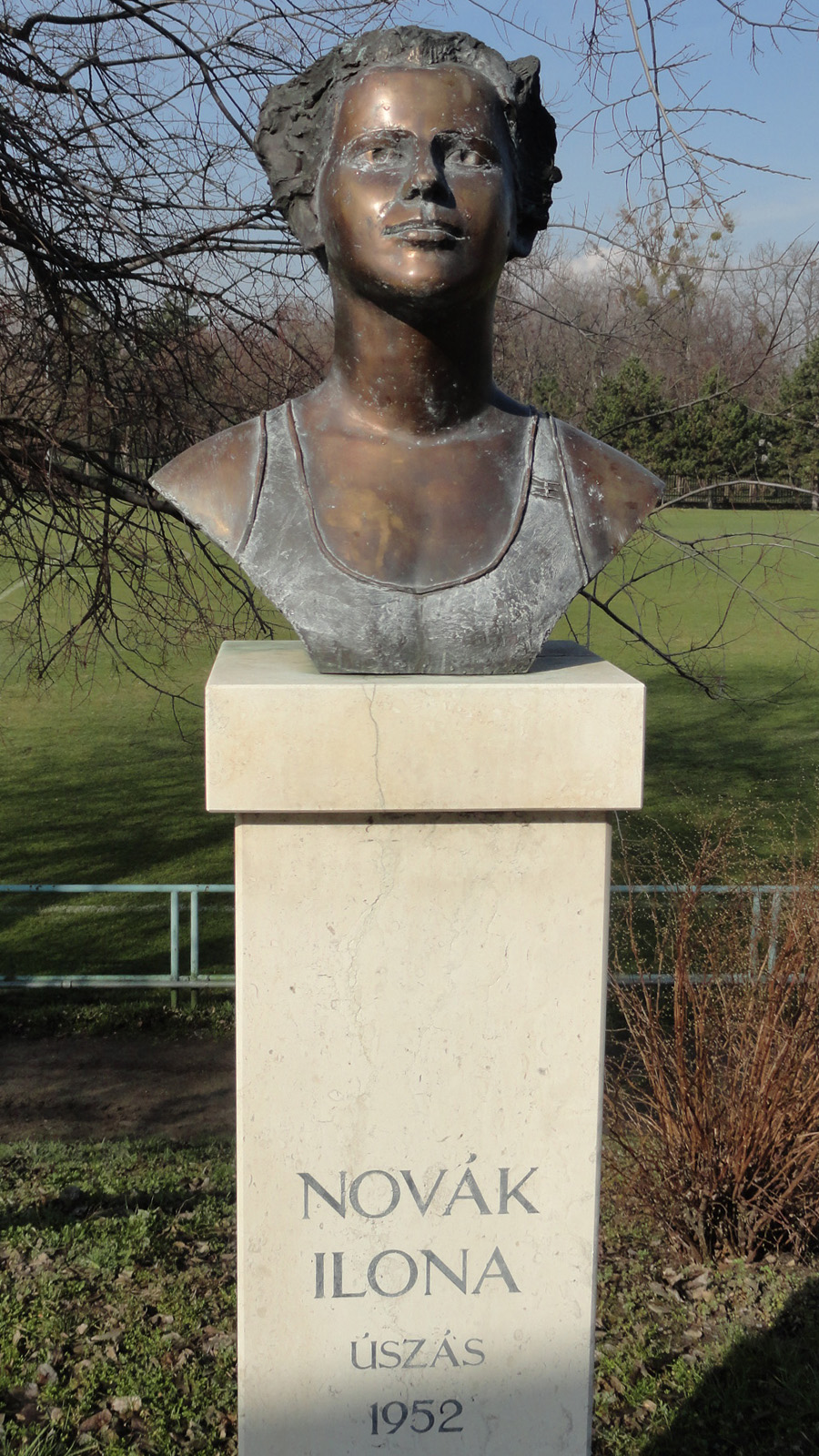
- Bust of Novák

Personal information
- Full name: Ilona Novák-Popper
- Nationality: Hungary
- Born: 16 May 1925 Budapest, Hungary
- Died: 14 March 2019 (aged 93) Budapest, Hungary

Sport
- Sport: Swimming
- Strokes: Freestyle and backstroke
- Club: Magyar Úszó Egyesület; Budapesti Kinizsi
Medal record
Women's swimming
Representing Hungary
Olympic Games
Gold medal – first place	1952 Helsinki	4×100 m freestyle

Ilona Novák (16 May 1925 – 14 March 2019) was a Hungarian swimmer and Olympic champion. She competed at the 1948 Olympic Games in London, where she finished 4th in 100 m backstroke and 5th in 4 × 100 m freestyle relay. At the 1952 Olympic Games in Helsinki she received a gold medal in 4 × 100 m freestyle relay as captain of the Hungarian team.

She was inducted into the International Swimming Hall of Fame in Fort Lauderdale, Florida in 1973, together with her sister, Éva Novák.

== See also ==
- List of members of the International Swimming Hall of Fame
- List of Olympic medalist families
