= Erik Swane Lund =

Danish fencer (1923–2012)

Personal information
- Born: 4 April 1923 Copenhagen, Denmark
- Died: 31 October 2012 (aged 89)

Sport
- Sport: Fencing

Erik Swane Lund (4 April 1923 – 31 October 2012) was a Danish fencer and lieutenant colonel of the Army Reserve. He competed in the team épée events at the 1952 Summer Olympics.
