= Ginette Jany-Sendral =

French swimmer

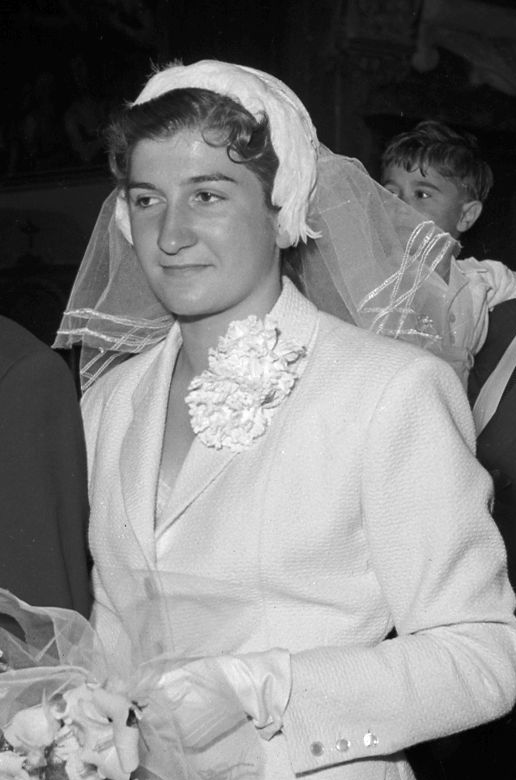

Personal information
- Born: 12 January 1932

Sport
- Sport: Swimming
- Strokes: backstroke, freestyle

Ginette Jany-Sendral (born 12 January 1932) is a French former swimmer. She competed at the 1948, 1952 and the 1956 Summer Olympics.
