= Ingegärd Fredin =

Swedish swimmer (1930–2020)

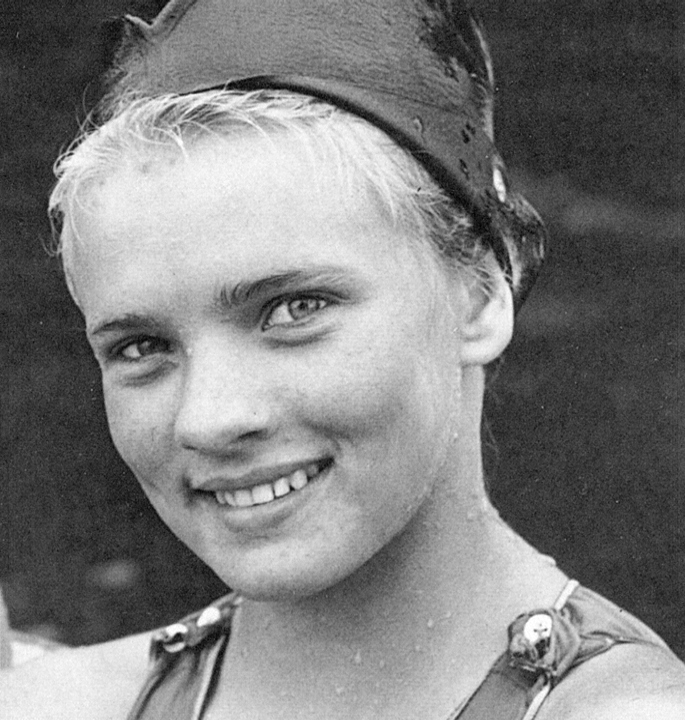

Personal information
- Full name: Eva Malin Ingegärd Fredin
- Born: 27 October 1930 Bromma, Stockholm, Sweden
- Died: 18 June 2020 (aged 89) Kirkland, Washington, United States

Sport
- Sport: Swimming
- Strokes: Freestyle
- Club: IFK Stockholm; SK Neptun, Stockholm
Medal record
Representing Sweden
European Championships
Bronze medal – third place	1950 Vienna	4×100 m freestyle

Eva Malin Ingegärd Fredin (also spelled as Ingegerd, 27 October 1930 – 18 June 2020) was a Swedish freestyle swimmer who won a bronze medal in the 4 × 100 m relay at the 1950 European Aquatics Championships. She competed at the 1948 and 1952 Olympics in the 100 m, 400 m and 4 × 100 m events with the best result of fifth place in the 100 m in 1948.

Fredin represented IFK Stockholm and SK Neptun
