= Marianne Lundquist =

Swedish swimmer (1931–2020)

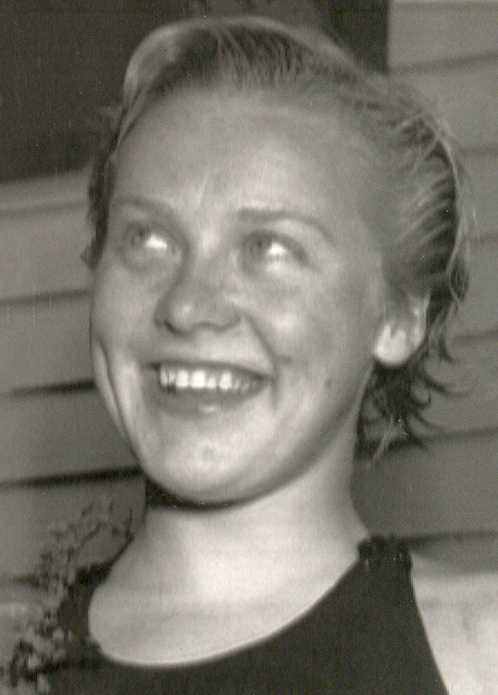

Personal information
- Born: 24 July 1931 Karlskoga, Sweden
- Died: 10 April 2020 (aged 88) Stockholm, Sweden

Sport
- Sport: Swimming
- Strokes: Freestyle
- Club: Karlskoga SS; SK Neptun, Stockholm
Medal record
Swimming
Representing Sweden
European Championships
Bronze medal – third place	1950 Vienna	4×100 m freestyle

Ingrid Marianne Lundquist (later Grane, 24 July 1931 – 10 April 2020) was a Swedish freestyle swimmer who won a bronze medal in the 4 × 100 m relay at the 1950 European Aquatics Championships. She competed at the 1948 and 1952 Olympics in the 100 m, 400 m and 4 × 100 m events with the best result of sixth place in the relay in 1952. She died 10 April 2020, from COVID-19.
