= Hannie Termeulen =

Dutch swimmer

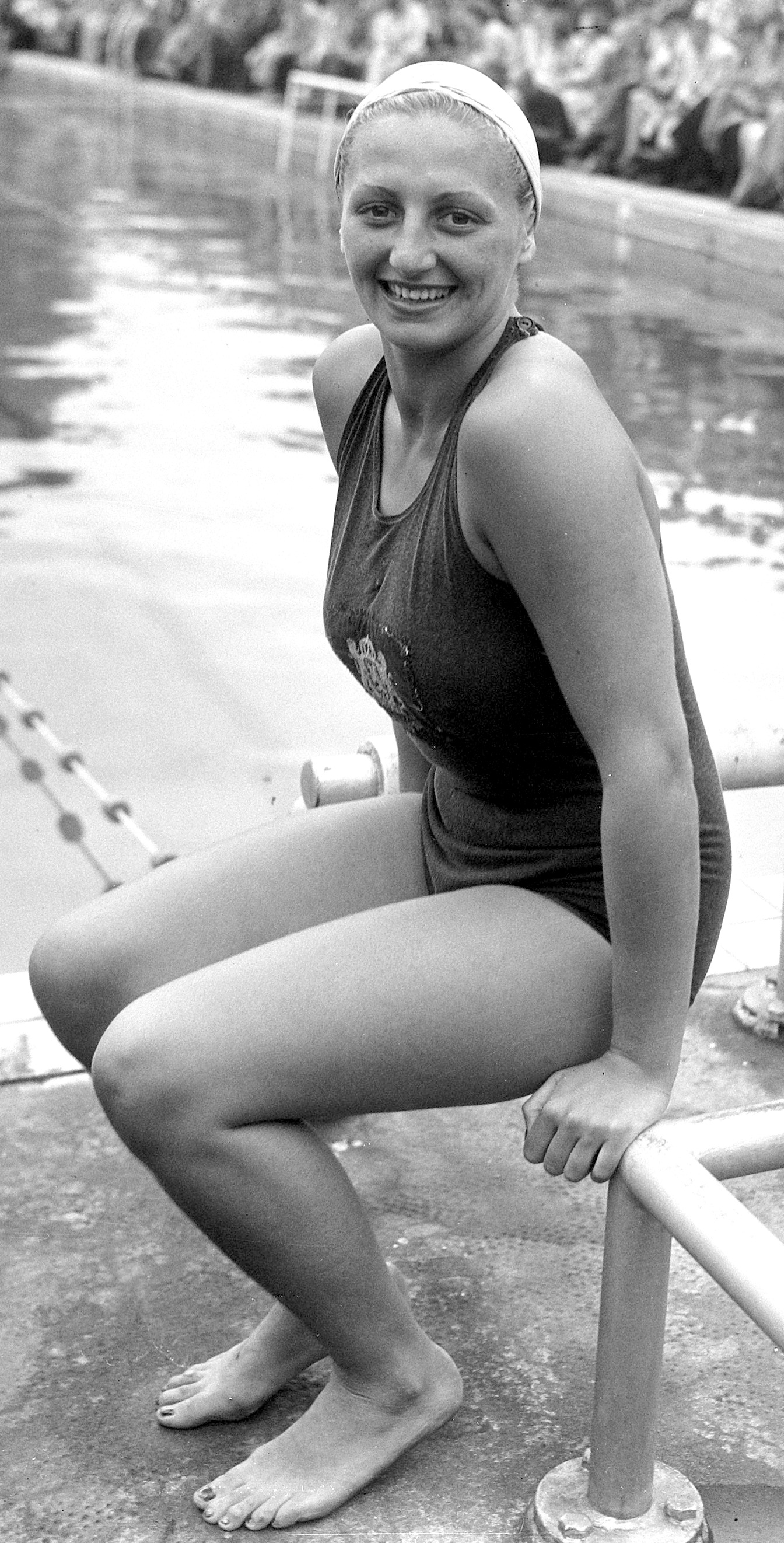
- Termeulen in 1952

Personal information
- Full name: Johanna Maria Termeulen
- Born: 18 February 1929 Wiesbaden, Germany
- Died: 1 March 2001 (aged 72) Amsterdam, the Netherlands

Sport
- Sport: Swimming
- Club: HDZ, Amsterdam
Medal record
Representing Netherlands
Olympic Games
Silver medal – second place	1952 Helsinki	100 m freestyle
Silver medal – second place	1952 Helsinki	4x100 m freestyle
Bronze medal – third place	1948 London	4x100 m freestyle
European Championships
Gold medal – first place	1950 Vienna	4×100 m freestyle
Silver medal – second place	1947 Monte Carlo	100 m freestyle
Silver medal – second place	1947 Monte Carlo	4×100 m freestyle

Johanna Maria "Hannie" Termeulen (18 February 1929 – 1 March 2001) was a freestyle swimmer from the Netherlands, who won three medals at the Summer Olympics. After having claimed the bronze medal in the women's 4 × 100 m freestyle relay in London in 1948, she won two silvers (100 m freestyle and 4 × 100 m freestyle relay) in Helsinki four years later. She also won three medals at the European championships of 1947 and 1950.
