= Kay McNamee =

Canadian swimmer (1931–2022)

Personal information
- Full name: Kathleen Mavis McNamee
- Born: January 8, 1931 Vancouver, British Columbia, Canada
- Died: January 11, 2022 (aged 91) Richmond, British Columbia, Canada

Sport
- Sport: Swimming

Kathleen Mavis McNamee (January 8, 1931 – January 11, 2022), known as Kay McNamee, was a Canadian swimmer. She competed at the 1948 Summer Olympics and the 1952 Summer Olympics.

== Personal life ==
McNamee was born on January 8, 1931, in Vancouver, British Columbia, Canada, and died in Richmond, British Columbia, on January 11, 2022, three days after her 91st birthday, from complications of COVID-19. Her son, with Canadian "Miracle Mile" runner Richard Ferguson, is Australian-born Canadian actor John Pyper-Ferguson. Her brother Gerry McNamee also represented Canada in swimming.
