= Joan Harrison (swimmer) =

South African swimmer (1935–2025)

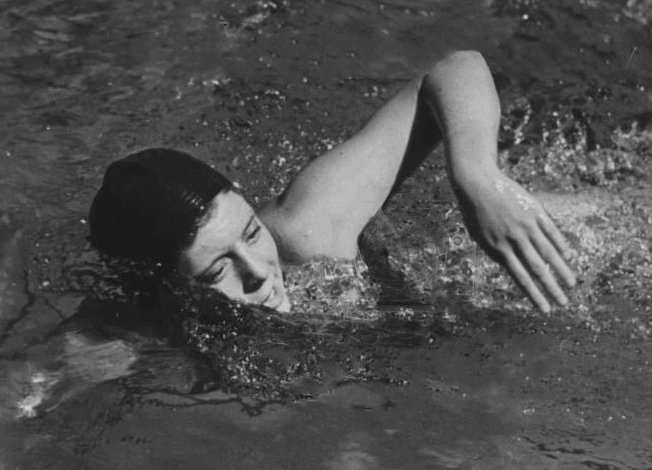
- Harrison in 1950

Personal information
- Full name: Joan Cynthia Harrison
- Nationality: South Africa
- Born: 29 November 1935 East London, Cape Province, South Africa
- Died: 20 May 2025 (aged 89)

Sport
- Sport: Swimming
- Strokes: Freestyle, backstroke
Medal record
Representing South Africa
Olympic Games
Gold medal – first place	1952 Helsinki	100 m backstroke
British Empire Games
Gold medal – first place	1950 Auckland	440 yd freestyle
Gold medal – first place	1954 Vancouver	110 yd backstroke
Gold medal – first place	1954 Vancouver	4×110 yd freestyle relay
Silver medal – second place	1954 Vancouver	3×110 yd medley relay
Bronze medal – third place	1950 Auckland	110 yd freestyle
Bronze medal – third place	1954 Vancouver	110 yd freestyle

Joan Cynthia Harrison (later Breetzke, 29 November 1935 – 20 May 2025) was a South African swimmer who won the 100 metres backstroke event at the 1952 Olympics. Harrison was born in 1935 in East London, South Africa. After setting multiple national records and winning multiple national titles at 13 years old, the year later, she won the 440-yard freestyle event at the 1950 British Empire Games. She then won gold in the 100 metres backstroke event at the 1952 Helsinki Olympics, making her the first South African swimmer to win Olympic gold. Harrison then won multiple medals, including two golds, at the 1954 British Empire and Commonwealth Games. She retired from international competitive swimming in 1956 at 22 years old.

== Career ==
Joan Cynthia Harrison was born on 29 November 1935 in East London, Cape Province, South Africa. Her mother was a swimmer and her father played rugby.

At 13 years old, Harrison won the 220-yard and 500-yard freestyle events at the South African national swimming championships. She also held two South African records and three South African junior records in the sport. At the 1950 British Empire Games she won the 440-yard freestyle event, finishing seven seconds ahead of second place with a new competition record which broke the old record by thirteen seconds. The also won bronze in the 110-yard freestyle event at that competition.

External videos
- Harrison wins the 100 metres backstroke at the 1952 Olympics

In 1952, she won gold in the 100 metres backstroke event at the Helsinki Olympics. This win made her the first South African swimmer to win Olympic gold. The next South African woman to win an Olympic medal was Penny Heyns in 1996. Upon arriving home from these Games, Harrison was greeted by thousands of people in the city hall. She later said: "People made a fuss about it. But my life did not really change. I was still an ordinary girl from East London. When we arrived back in the city there were thousands of people waiting for me at the city hall."

At the 1954 British Empire and Commonwealth Games, Harrison won gold in the 110 yards backstroke, gold as part of the South African team in the 4×110 yards freestyle relay, silver as part of the South African team in the 3×110 yards medley relay, and bronze in the 110 yards freestyle. She retired from international competitive swimming in 1956 at 17 years old, though she later competed at the 1956 South African national championships, where she won two events.

== Personal life ==
Harrison attended Clarendon High School for Girls. She married in 1956 to Charles Breetzke, changing her name to Joan Breetzke, and had four children.

In December 2022, Harrison's Olympic and Commonwealth medals were stolen from her house. In January, they were returned, having been found lying in some grass in the city.

== Death and legacy ==
In 1982, Harrison was inducted into the International Swimming Hall of Fame. In 2023, an aquatics centre in Clarendon was built, named the "Harrison Aquatic Centre" in her honour.

Harrison died on 20 May 2025, at the age of 89.

== See also ==
- List of members of the International Swimming Hall of Fame
