= Josette Arène =

French swimmer (1924–2019)

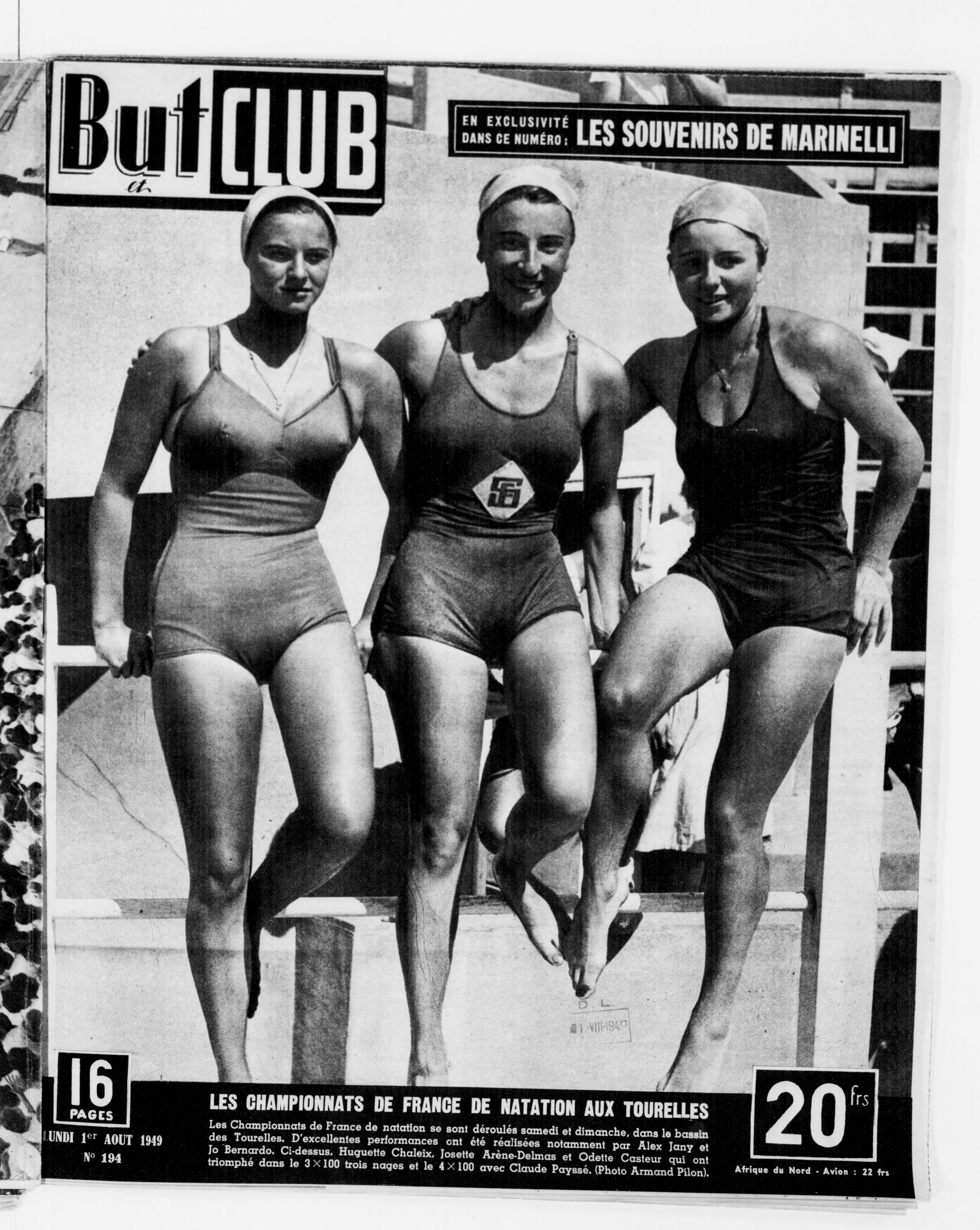
- Josette Arène-Delmas (middle) and Odette Lusien (left) at the French Swimming National Championships in 1949 at the Piscine des Tourelles.

Personal information
- Born: August 13, 1924
- Died: August 13, 2019 (aged 95)

Sport
- Sport: Swimming

Josette Arène (née Delmas, 13 August 1924 – 13 August 2019) was a French swimmer who competed in the 1948 Summer Olympics and in the 1952 Summer Olympics. Arène died in August 2019 at the age of 95.
