= Judit Temes =

Hungarian swimmer (1930–2013)

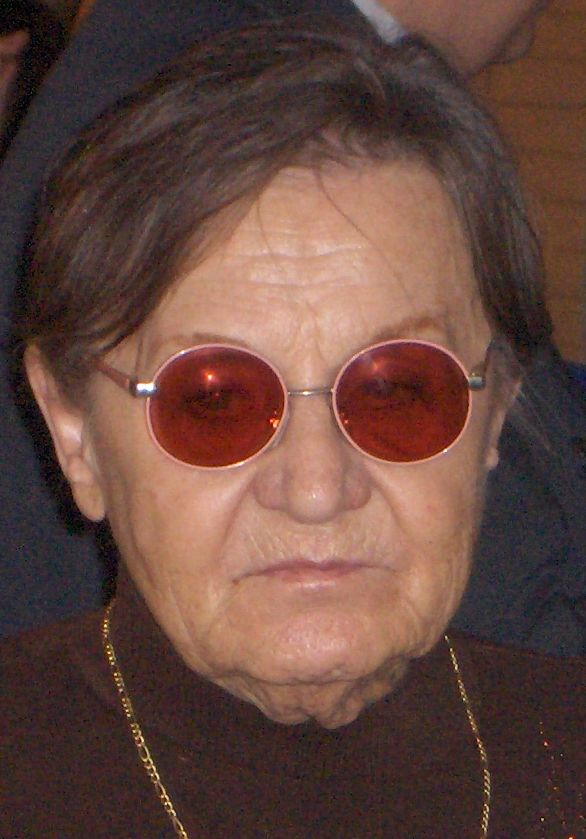
- Temes in 2006

Personal information
- Full name: Judit Temes-Tuider
- Born: 10 October 1930 Sopron, Hungary
- Died: 11 August 2013 (aged 82) Budapest, Hungary

Sport
- Sport: Swimming
- Strokes: Freestyle
- Club: Budapesti Székesfőváros Közlekedési; Budapesti Előre Sport Club; Budapesti Haladás
Medal record
Women's swimming
Representing Hungary
Olympic Games
Bronze medal – third place	1952 Helsinki	100 m freestyle
Gold medal – first place	1952 Helsinki	4×100 m freestyle
European Championships (LC)
Gold medal – first place	1954 Turin	4×100 m freestyle
Silver medal – second place	1954 Turin	100 m freestyle

Judit Temes (Hungarian pronunciation: [ˈjudit ˈtɛmɛʃ]; 10 October 1930 – 11 August 2013) was a Hungarian swimmer and Olympic champion.

Temes, who was Jewish, was born in Sopron. She competed at the 1952 Olympic Games in Helsinki, where she received a bronze medal in 100 m freestyle, and a gold medal in 4 × 100 m freestyle relay.

After retirement she pursued a medical career and earned her medical degree in 1955 from the Budapest University of Medicine. Later on she worked for the university pathology department and cancer research institute and then headed the St. Elizabeth Hospital Department of Pathology.

== See also ==
- List of select Jewish swimmers
