= Irma Heijting-Schuhmacher =

Dutch swimmer (1925–2014)

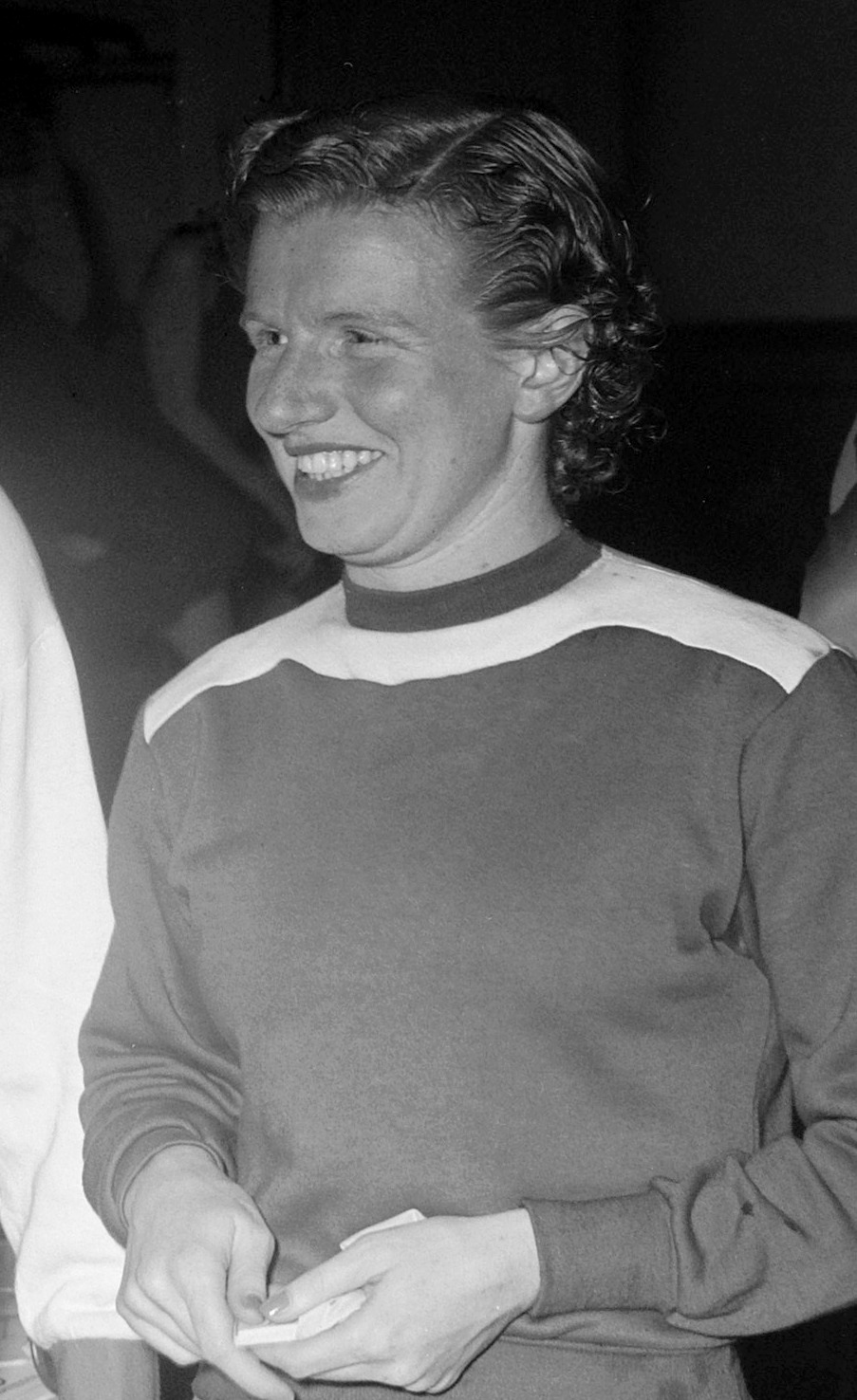
- Irma Schuhmacher in 1951

Personal information
- Born: 24 February 1925 Ginneken en Bavel, the Netherlands
- Died: 8 January 2014 (aged 88) Berkeley Vale, New South Wales, Australia

Sport
- Sport: Swimming
- Club: RDZ, Rotterdam
- Coach: Ma Braun
Medal record
Representing Netherlands
Olympic Games
Silver medal – second place	1952 Helsinki	4×100 m freestyle
Bronze medal – third place	1948 London	4×100 m freestyle
European Championships
Gold medal – first place	1950 Vienna	100 m freestyle
Gold medal – first place	1950 Vienna	4×100 m relay
Silver medal – second place	1947 Monte Carlo	4×100 m relay
Silver medal – second place	1950 Vienna	400 m freestyle

Irma Heijting-Schuhmacher (24 February 1925 – 8 January 2014) was a freestyle swimmer from the Netherlands who won two medals at the Summer Olympics. After having claimed the bronze medal in the 4 × 100 m freestyle relay in London (1948), she won the silver medal four years later in Helsinki, Finland, in the same event. Individually, she was sixth in the 100 m freestyle at both games. She also won two gold and two silver medals at the 1947 and 1950 European Championships.

In 1950, while touring Australia with Geertje Wielema, Schuhmacher met Johan Heijting, a Dutch animal husbandry specialist who had recently immigrated to Australia. They married on 22 March 1952, and one week after the 1952 Olympics, Heijting-Schuhmacher moved to her husband's breeding farm near Brisbane.
