= Mette Ove-Petersen =

Danish swimmer (1934–2007)

Personal information
- Born: 15 January 1934 Copenhagen, Denmark
- Died: 17 February 2007 (aged 73)

Sport
- Sport: Swimming
- Club: P08, København
Medal record
Women's swimming
Representing Denmark
European Championships
Silver medal – second place	1950 Vienna	4×100 m freestyle

Mette Ove-Petersen (15 January 1934 – 17 February 2007) was a Danish swimmer who won a silver medal at the 1950 European Aquatics Championships in the 4 × 100 m freestyle relay. She finished fourth in the same event at the 1952 Summer Olympics; individually, she was eliminated in the preliminaries of the 100 m and 400 m freestyle. Ove-Petersen died on 17 February 2007, at the age of 73.
