= Greta Andersen =

Danish swimmer (1927–2023)

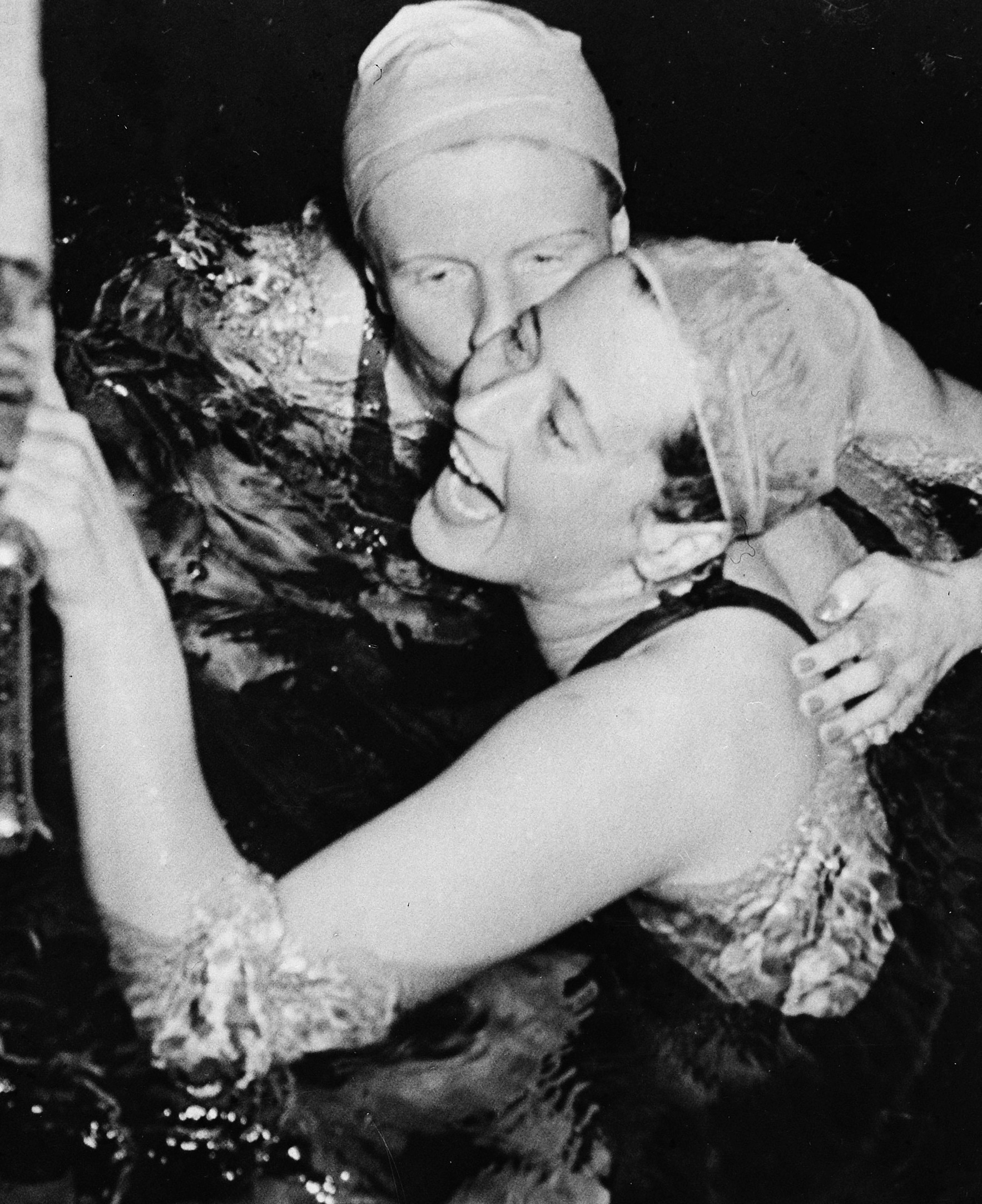
- Andersen in 1951

Personal information
- Full name: Greta Marie Andersen
- Born: 1 May 1927 Copenhagen, Denmark
- Died: 6 February 2023 (aged 95) Solvang, California, U.S.
- Height: 5 ft 8.5 in (1.740 m)
- Weight: 141 lb (64 kg)

Sport
- Sport: Swimming
- Club: Svømmeklubben Triton, Ballerup (1943–1946); DKG, København (1946–1950s)
- Coach: Else Jacobsen, Ingeborg Paul Petersen
Medal record
Representing Denmark
Olympic Games
Gold medal – first place	1948 London	100 m freestyle
Silver medal – second place	1948 London	4×100 m freestyle
European Championships
Gold medal – first place	1947 Monte Carlo	4×100 m freestyle
Bronze medal – third place	1947 Monte Carlo	100 m freestyle
Gold medal – first place	1950 Vienna	400 m freestyle
Silver medal – second place	1950 Vienna	4×100 m freestyle
Bronze medal – third place	1950 Vienna	100 m freestyle

Greta Marie Andersen (married names Jeppesen and Sonnichsen and Veress, 1 May 1927 – 6 February 2023) was a Danish swimmer who won a gold and a silver medal in 100 m freestyle events at the 1948 Summer Olympics. In the mid-1950s she moved to the United States, where she set several world records in marathon swimming in the distances up to 50 miles.

== Early life ==
Andersen was born on 1 May 1927 in Copenhagen to Mourits Peter Andersen and Charlotte Emerentze Benedikte Nielsen.

== Swimming career ==
Andersen began swimming in a club aged 16 while also doing gymnastics. In 1947, she won two European medals at her first international competition. The next year she won two more medals at the London Olympics, a gold in the 100m freestyle and a silver in the 4 × 100m freestyle relay. She failed to finish her 400m freestyle race due to sudden stomach cramps – she fainted and was rescued from drowning by fellow competitors Nancy Lees and Elemér Szathmáry. According to her recollections, an injection the swimming team's medical doctor gave her to delay her period caused her legs to be paralyzed and for her to subsequently faint. In 1949, Andersen set a world record in the 100 yard freestyle at 58.2 seconds, which stood for seven years. She took part in three events at the 1952 Olympics, but could not use one leg due to a recent knee surgery, and failed to medal. Her best result at those Games was a fourth place in the 4 × 100m freestyle relay. During her career in Europe, she won nine individual Danish titles, several team titles, and four individual Scandinavian titles.

In 1953, she immigrated to Long Beach, California, and obtained American citizenship in 1959 while still married to her second husband John Sonnichsen in Long Beach. There she switched to marathon swimming and became the first person to swim a major channel both ways (the Santa Catalina Channel in 1958). She also set world records in the 10, 25 and 50 miles. Between 1957 and 1965 she crossed the English Channel six times, setting a record for most Channel swims by a woman, as well as a speed record for women at 10:59 h in 1958. She also set an unofficial record for the longest Channel swim, while trying for 23 hours to cross the Channel forth and back in 1965.

In 1969, Andersen was inducted into the International Swimming Hall of Fame (ISHOF). In 2015, ISHOF honored her with a Lifetime Achievement Award.

== Personal life ==
After a previous marriage (Valby, Copenhagen, 1952) to Danish engineer Helge Jeppesen ended in divorce, Andersen married John Sonnichsen in Long Beach in 1957. The couple opened a swimming school in Los Alamitos in 1960. The school existed until 1980. Andersen was among the pioneers in baby swimming, and continued as swimming instructor also after the school had closed. Andersen and Sonnichsen divorced, and in 1966 in Nevada she married Hungarian-born doctor Andre Veress; the couple lived for many years in Huntington Beach. In 2017 they moved to Solvang.

Andersen died at her home in Solvang, California, on 6 February 2023, at the age of 95.

== Books ==
- Andersen, Greta (1952). En svømmepiges med- og modgang. OCLC 77313167.

== See also ==
- List of members of the International Swimming Hall of Fame
