= Brazil at the 1948 Summer Olympics =

- IOC code: BRA
- NOC: Brazilian Olympic Committee

in London
- Competitors: 70 (59 men and 11 women) in 11 sports
- Flag bearer: Sylvio de Magalhães Padilha
- Medals Ranked 34th: Gold 0 Silver 0 Bronze 1 Total 1

Summer Olympics appearances (overview)
- 1920; 1924; 1928; 1932; 1936; 1948; 1952; 1956; 1960; 1964; 1968; 1972; 1976; 1980; 1984; 1988; 1992; 1996; 2000; 2004; 2008; 2012; 2016; 2020; 2024; 2028

Brazil competed at the 1948 Summer Olympics in London, United Kingdom. 70 competitors, 59 men and 11 women, took part in 41 events in 11 sports. A Brazilian medal was won for the first time since the country's debut at the 1920 Summer Olympics, with a bronze by the men's basketball team. With seven consecutive victories, the basketball team only lost in the semifinals, against France. In the dispute for bronze, the team coached by Moacir Daiuto beat Mexico by 52 to 47, guaranteeing the first medal ever won by Brazilians not only in Basketball as also in a team sport.

== Medalists ==
Medal	Name	Sport	Event	Date
Bronze	Brazil national men's basketball team: Algodão; João Francisco Bráz; Ruy de Freitas; Marcus Vinícius Dias; Affonso Évora; Alexandre Gemignani; Alfredo da Motta; Alberto Marson; Nilton Pacheco; Massinet Sorcinelli	Basketball	Men's tournament	August 13

Medals by sport
Sport	1st place, gold medalist(s)	2nd place, silver medalist(s)	3rd place, bronze medalist(s)	Total
Basketball	0	0	1	1
Total	0	0	1	1

Medals by gender
Gender	1st place, gold medalist(s)	2nd place, silver medalist(s)	3rd place, bronze medalist(s)	Total
Male	0	0	1	1
Female	0	0	0	0
Mixed	0	0	0	0
Total	0	0	1	1

== Athletics ==
Men
Track & road events

Athlete	Event	Heat		Quarterfinal		Semifinal		Final	
Athlete	Event	Result	Rank	Result	Rank	Result	Rank	Result	Rank
Ivan Hausen	100 m	10.9	2 Q	NT	4	did not advance			
Ivan Hausen	200 m	22.2	2 Q	22.3	4	did not advance			
Aroldo da Silva	100 m	10.6	2 Q	NT	4	did not advance			
Aroldo da Silva	200 m	21.9	2 Q	22.0	3 Q	NT	4	did not advance	
Hélio da Silva	100 m	NT	4	did not advance					
Rosalvo Ramos	200 m	22.2	2 Q	NT	6	did not advance			
Rosalvo Ramos	400 m	49.2	2 Q	48.7	3 Q	49.1	5	did not advance	
Aroldo da Silva; Hélio da Silva; Ivan Hausen; Rosalvo Ramos	4 × 100 m relay	42.4	9	did not advance					

Field events

Athlete	Event	Qualification		Final	
Athlete	Event	Distance	Position	Distance	Position
Geraldo de Oliveira	Triple jump	14.590	9 Q	14.825	5
Adhemar da Silva	Triple jump	14.690	4 Q	14.490	8
Hélio da Silva	Triple jump	14.640	6 Q	14.310	11

Women
Track & road events

Athlete	Event	Heat		Quarterfinal		Semifinal		Final	
Athlete	Event	Result	Rank	Result	Rank	Result	Rank	Result	Rank
Melânia Luz	200 m	26.6	4	did not advance					
Helena de Menezes	100 m	13.2	3	did not advance					
Helena de Menezes	200 m	27.7	4	did not advance					
Elizabeth Müller	100 m	13.2	4	did not advance					
Benedicta de Oliveira	100 m	13.2	4	did not advance					
Lucila Pini	200 m	27.6	3	did not advance					
Benedicta de Oliveira; Melânia Luz; Gertrudes Morg; Lucila Pini	4 × 100 m relay	49.0	9	did not advance					

Field events

Athlete	Event	Qualification		Final	
Athlete	Event	Distance	Position	Distance	Position
Gertrudes Morg	Long jump	5.120	20	did not advance	
Elizabeth Müller	Shot put	11.870	13	did not advance	
Elizabeth Müller	High jump	—N/a		1.40	17

== Basketball ==
=== Preliminary round ===
==== Group A ====
Team	Pld	W	L	PF	PA	PD	Pts
Brazil	5	5	0	261	150	+111	10
Uruguay	5	3	2	246	170	+76	8
Hungary	5	3	2	201	172	+29	8
Canada	5	3	2	222	205	+17	8
Italy	5	1	4	170	208	−38	6
Great Britain	5	0	5	103	298	−195	5

Brazil	45–41	Hungary

Harringay Arena, London

Brazil	36–32	Uruguay

Harringay Arena, London

Brazil	76–11	Great Britain

Harringay Arena, London

Brazil	57–35	Canada

Harringay Arena, London

Brazil	47–31	Italy

Harringay Arena, London

=== Quarterfinals ===
Brazil	28–23	Czechoslovakia

Harringay Arena, London

=== Semifinals ===
Brazil	33–45	France

Harringay Arena, London

=== Bronze medal match ===
Mexico	47–52	Brazil

Harringay Arena, London

== Boxing ==
Men

Athlete	Event	1 Round	2 Round	Quarterfinals	Semifinals	Final	
Athlete	Event	Opposition Result	Opposition Result	Opposition Result	Opposition Result	Opposition Result	Rank
Manoel do Nascimento	Bantamweight	Tibor Csík (HUN); L DQ2	did not advance				
Ralph Zumbano	Lightweight	Franz Ehringer (LUX); W KO-2	Auguste Caulet (AUS); W PTS	Wallace Smith (USA); L KO-2	did not advance		5
Vicente dos Santos	Heavyweight	Jay Lambert (USA); L PTS	did not advance				

== Diving ==
Men

Athlete	Event	Final	
Athlete	Event	Total	Rank
Milton Busin	3 m springboard	113.86	11
Gunnar Kemnitz	3 m springboard	102.22	21
Haroldo Mariano	10 m platform	90.00	16

== Equestrian ==
=== Eventing ===
Athlete	Horse	Event	Dressage		Cross-country			Jumping			Total	
Athlete	Horse	Event	Dressage		Cross-country			Final			Total	
Athlete	Horse	Event	Penalties	Rank	Penalties	Total	Rank	Penalties	Total	Rank	Penalties	Rank
Aëcio Coelho	Guapo	Individual	114.00	16	72	42.00	10	10	52.00	7	52.00	7
Renyldo Ferreira	Indio	Individual	184.00	43	54	210.00	37	40	250.00	31	250.00	31
Anísio da Rocha	Carioca	Individual	185.00	44	36	229.00	38	DNF		AC	DNF	AC
Aëcio Coelho; Renyldo Ferreira; Anísio da Rocha	See above	Team	483.00	13	162	481.00	11	50	302.0	AC	302.0	AC

=== Show jumping ===
Athlete	Horse	Event	Final	
Athlete	Horse	Event	Penalties	Rank
Eloy de Menezes	Sabu	Individual	DNQ	
Francisco Pontes	Itaguai	Individual	20	10
Ruben Ribeiro	Bon Soir	Individual	DNQ	
Eloy de Menezes; Francisco Pontes; Ruben Ribeiro	See above	Team	20	DNF

== Fencing ==
Seven fencers, all men, represented Brazil in 1948.

Men

Ranks given are within the pool.

Fencer	Event	Round 1		Round 2		Quarterfinals		Semifinals		Final	
Fencer	Event	Result	Rank	Result	Rank	Result	Rank	Result	Rank	Result	Rank
Lodovico Alessandri	Men's foil	5–2	3 Q	0–7	8	did not advance					
Salvatore Scianamea	Men's foil	0–7	8	did not advance							
Henrique de Aguilar	Men's épée	3–5	6	did not advance							
Fortunato de Barros	Men's épée	3–5	5	did not advance							
Mario Biancalana	Men's épée	3-5	3 Q	4-4	2 Q	3-6	8	did not advance			
Etienne Molnar	Men's sabre	4–1	2 Q	2–5	7	did not advance					
Mario Biancalana; Fortunato de Barros; Henrique de Aguilar; Walter de Paula; Salvatore Scianamea	Team epee	Italy; L 2–14; Great Britain; L 6–8	3	did not advance							

== Modern pentathlon ==
Three male pentathletes represented Brazil in 1948.

Men

Athlete	Event	Riding (show jumping)	Fencing (épée one touch)	Shooting (25 m rapid-fire pistol)	Swimming (300 m freestyle)	Running (4000 m)	Total points	Final rank
Athlete	Event	Points	Points	Points	Points	Points	Total points	Final rank
Humberto Bedford	Men's	37	43	40	43	42	205	43
Aloysio Borges	Men's	33	26	36	8	43	146	38
Aëcio Coelho	Men's	15	1	33	39	37	125	30

== Rowing ==
Brazil had two male rowers participate in one out of seven rowing events in 1948.

Men

Athlete	Event	Heats		Repechage		Semifinals		Final	
Athlete	Event	Time	Rank	Time	Rank	Time	Rank	Time	Rank
Pércio Zancani; Paulo Diebold	Men's coxless pair	7:33.1	1 Q	—N/a		8:18.6	2	did not advance	

== Sailing ==
Open

Athlete	Event	Race														Final rank	
Athlete	Event	1		2		3		4		5		6		7		Final rank	
Athlete	Event	Score	Rank	Score	Rank	Score	Rank	Score	Rank	Score	Rank	Score	Rank	Score	Rank	Score	Rank
Wolfgang Richter	Firefly	7	578	~~DNF~~	0	6	645	19	144	4	821	15	247	9	469	2904	11
Victório Ferraz; Carlos Borchers	Swallow	9	293	11	206	9	293	~~12~~	168	8	344	2	946	5	548	2630	10
E. Rocco de Paula Simoes; Carlos Bittencourt Filho; M. Rocco de Paula Simoes	Star	~~16~~	127	13	217	11	290	10	331	14	185	10	331	11	290	1644	14

== Shooting ==
Seven shooters represented Brazil in 1948.

Men

Athlete	Event	Final	
Athlete	Event	Score	Rank
Manoel Braga	50 metre rifle prone	589	28
João de Faria	50 metre rifle prone	584	45
Silvino Ferreira	50 m pistol	511	28
Álvaro dos Santos Filho	50 m pistol	509	31
Álvaro dos Santos Filho	25 m rapid fire pistol	527	34
Antônio Guimarães	50 metre rifle prone	594	13
Pedro Simão	25 m rapid fire pistol	540	30
Allan Sobocinski	25 m rapid fire pistol	490	56

== Swimming ==
Men

Athlete	Event	Heat		Semifinal		Final	
Athlete	Event	Time	Rank	Time	Rank	Time	Rank
Aram Boghossian	100 metre freestyle	1:00.9	15 Q	1:01.0	14	did not advance	
Rolf Egon	1500 metre freestyle	20:36.3	15 q	20:44.6	14	did not advance	
Ilo da Fonseca	100 metre backstroke	1:11.9	2 Q	1:11.6	7	did not advance	
Plauto Guimarães	100 metre freestyle	1:03.7	33	did not advance			
Willy Otto Jordan	200 metre breaststroke	2:46.4	6 Q	2:43.9	2 Q	2:46.4	6
Sérgio Rodrigues	100 metre freestyle	1:01.6	22	did not advance			
Hélio Silva	100 metre backstroke	1:10.5	3 q	1:10.1	5	did not advance	
Paulo Silva	100 metre backstroke	1:10.0	3 q	1:09.8	6	did not advance	
Sérgio Rodrigues; Willy Otto Jordan; Rolf Kestener; Aram Boghossian	4 x 200 metre freestyle	9:19.9	7 q	—N/a		9:31.0	8

Women

Athlete	Event	Heat		Semifinal		Final	
Athlete	Event	Time	Rank	Time	Rank	Time	Rank
Piedade Coutinho-Tavares	100 metre freestyle	1:08.6	11 Q	1:16.0	13	did not advance	
Piedade Coutinho-Tavares	400 metre freestyle	5:30.0	6 Q	5:31.1	7 Q	5:29.4	6
Maria da Costa	100 metre freestyle	1:16.0	32	did not advance			
Edith de Oliveira	100 metre backstroke	1:22.5	19	did not advance			
Eleonora Schmitt	100 metre freestyle	1:10.8	21	did not advance			
Eleonora Schmitt; Maria da Costa; Talita Rodrígues; Piedade Coutinho-Tavares	4 x 100 metre freestyle	4:51.4	8 q	—N/a		4:49.1	6
