= Swimming at the 1948 Summer Olympics – Women's 4 × 100 metre freestyle relay =

Women's 4 × 100 metre freestyle relay at the Games of the XIV Olympiad
- Venue: Wembley Arena
- Dates: 4 August 1948 (heats); 6 August 1948 (final)
- Competitors: 46 from 11 nations
- Teams: 11
- Winning time: 4:29.2 OR

Medalists
1st place, gold medalist(s)		Marie Corridon, Thelma Kalama, Brenda Helser, Ann Curtis	United States
2nd place, silver medalist(s)		Eva Arndt-Riise, Karen Margrethe Harup, Greta Andersen, Fritze Carstensen	Denmark
3rd place, bronze medalist(s)		Irma Heijting-Schuhmacher, Margot Marsman, Marie-Louise Linssen-Vaessen, Hannie Termeulen	Netherlands

The women's 4 × 100 metre freestyle relay event at the 1948 Olympic Games took place on 4 and 6 August at the Empire Pool. This swimming event used freestyle as a relay, with swimmers typically using the front crawl. Because an Olympic size swimming pool is 50 metres long, each of the four swimmers completed two lengths of the pool. The first swimmer had to touch the wall before the second could leave the starting block; timing of the starts was thus important.

== Results ==
=== Heats ===
Heat One

Place	Swimmers	Time	Qual.
1	Eva Arndt-Riise, Elvi Svendsen, Fritze Carstensen and Greta Andersen (DEN)	4:33.5	QQ
2	Marie Corridon, Thelma Kalama, Brenda Helser, and Ann Curtis (USA)	4:34.1	QQ
3	Margaret Wellington, Patricia Nielsen, Lillian Preece, and Cathie Gibson (GBR)	4:36.1	QQ
4	Josette Arène, Colette Thomas, Marie Foucher-Creteau and Ginette Jany-Sendral (FRA)	4:50.0	QQ
5	Enriqueta Duarte, Liliana Gonzalias, Adriana Camelli and Eileen Holt (ARG)	4:59.5	
6	Kay McNamee, Joyce Court, Vivian King and Irene Strong (CAN)	5:04.5	

Heat Two

Place	Swimmers	Time	Qual.
1	Irma Heijting-Schuhmacher, Margot Marsman, Marie-Louise Linssen-Vaessen and Hannie Termeulen (NED)	4:31.3	QQ
2	Marianne Lundquist, Gisela Thidholm, Elisabeth Ahlgren and Ingegerd Fredin (SWE)	4:38.5	QQ
3	Mária Littomeritzky, Judit Temes, Éva Székely and Ilona Novák (HUN)	4:47.5	QQ
4	Eleonora Schmitt, Maria da Costa, Talita Rodrígues and Piedade Coutinho-Tavares (BRA)	4:51.4	QQ
5	Maria Huybrechts, Maria Oeyen, Maria Van Den Brande and Fernande Caroen (BEL)	4:54.9	

=== Final ===
Place	Swimmers	Time	Qual.
1st place, gold medalist(s)	Marie Corridon, Thelma Kalama, Brenda Helser, and Ann Curtis (USA)	4:29.2	OR
2nd place, silver medalist(s)	Eva Arndt-Riise, Karen Margrethe Harup, Greta Andersen, Fritze Carstensen (DEN)	4:29.6	
3rd place, bronze medalist(s)	Irma Heijting-Schuhmacher, Margot Marsman, Marie-Louise Linssen-Vaessen and Hannie Termeulen (NED)	4:31.6	
4	Patricia Nielsen, Margaret Wellington, Lillian Preece, and Cathie Gibson (GBR)	4:34.7	
5	Mária Littomeritzky, Ilona Novák, Judit Temes and Éva Székely (HUN)	4:44.8	
6	Eleonora Schmitt, Maria da Costa, Talita Rodrígues and Piedade Coutinho-Tavares (BRA)	4:49.1	
7	Josette Arène, Gisèle Vallerey, Colette Thomas, Ginette Jany-Sendral (FRA)	4:49.8	
	Gisela Thidholm, Elisabeth Ahlgren, Marianne Lundquist and Ingegerd Fredin (SWE)	DQ	
