= Swimming at the 1948 Summer Olympics – Women's 400 metre freestyle =

Women's 400 metre freestyle at the Games of the XIV Olympiad
- Venue: Wembley Arena
- Date: 5 August 1948 (heats); 6 August 1948 (semifinals); 7 August 1948 (final)
- Competitors: 19 from 11 nations
- Winning time: 5:17.8 OR

Medalists
| 1st place, gold medalist(s) | | Ann Curtis; United States |
| 2nd place, silver medalist(s) | | Karen Harup; Denmark |
| 3rd place, bronze medalist(s) | | Catherine Gibson; Great Britain |

The women's 400 metre freestyle event at the 1948 Olympic Games took place between 5 and 7 August at the Empire Pool. This swimming event used freestyle swimming, which means that the method of the stroke is not regulated (unlike backstroke, breaststroke, and butterfly events). Nearly all swimmers use the front crawl or a variant of that stroke. Because an Olympic size swimming pool is 50 meters long, this race consisted of eight lengths of the pool.

== Results ==
=== Heats ===
| Rank | Athlete | Country | Time | Notes |
|---|---|---|---|---|
| 1 | Cathie Gibson | Great Britain | 5:26.9 | |
| 2 | Fernande Caroen | Belgium | 5:29.2 | |
| 3 | Fritze Carstensen | Denmark | 5:29.4 | |
| 4 | Nancy Lees | United States | 5:29.6 | |
| 5 | Brenda Helser | United States | 5:30.0 | |
| 6 | Piedade Coutinho-Tavares | Brazil | 5:30.0 | |
| 7 | Karen Margrethe Harup | Denmark | 5:31.7 | |
| 8 | Ann Curtis | United States | 5:32.0 | |
| 9 | Colette Thomas | France | 5:32.9 | |
| 10 | Gisela Thidholm | Sweden | 5:34.5 | |
| 11 | Margaret Wellington | Great Britain | 5:40.0 | |
| 12 | Patricia Nielsen | Great Britain | 5:40.4 | |
| 13 | Denise Spencer | Australia | 5:40.9 | |
| 14 | Magda Bruggemann | Mexico | 5:43.8 | |
| 15 | Eileen Holt | Argentina | 5:44.9 | |
| 16 | Vivian King | Canada | 5:54.8 | |
| 17 | Kay McNamee | Canada | 5:58.7 | |
| 18 | Enriqueta Duarte | Argentina | 6:14.4 | |
| 19 | Greta Andersen | Denmark | DNF | |

=== Semifinals ===
| Rank | Athlete | Country | Time | Notes |
|---|---|---|---|---|
| 1 | Karen Margrethe Harup | Denmark | 5:25.7 | OR |
| 2 | Fernande Caroen | Belgium | 5:26.1 | Q |
| 3 | Ann Curtis | United States | 5:26.4 | Q |
| 4 | Brenda Helser | United States | 5:28.1 | Q |
| 5 | Fritze Carstensen | Denmark | 5:29.5 | Q |
| 6 | Cathie Gibson | Great Britain | 5:31.0 | q |
| 7 | Piedade Coutinho-Tavares | Brazil | 5:31.1 | Q |
| 8 | Nancy Lees | United States | 5:31.9 | q |
| 9 | Colette Thomas | France | 5:35.3 | |
| 10 | Denise Spencer | Australia | 5:35.6 | |
| 11 | Margaret Wellington | Great Britain | 5:38.2 | |
| 12 | Patricia Nielsen | Great Britain | 5:39.5 | |
| 13 | Magda Bruggemann | Mexico | 5:42.4 | |
| 14 | Eileen Holt | Argentina | 5:52.4 | |
| 15 | Vivian King | Canada | 5:52.7 | |
| 16 | Gisela Thidholm | Sweden | DNS | |

=== Final ===
| Rank | Athlete | Country | Time | Notes |
|---|---|---|---|---|
| 1 | Ann Curtis | United States | 5:17.8 | OR |
| 2 | Karen Margrethe Harup | Denmark | 5:21.2 | |
| 3 | Catherine Gibson | Great Britain | 5:22.5 | |
| 4 | Fernande Caroen | Belgium | 5:25.3 | |
| 5 | Brenda Helser | United States | 5:26.0 | |
| 6 | Piedade Coutinho | Brazil | 5:29.4 | |
| 7 | Fritze Carstensen | Denmark | 5:29.4 | |
| 8 | Nancy Lees | United States | 5:32.9 | |

Key: OR = Olympic record
