= Swimming at the 1948 Summer Olympics – Men's 100 metre backstroke =

Men's 100 metre backstroke at the Games of the XIV Olympiad
- Venue: Wembley Arena
- Dates: 4 August 1948 (heats); 5 August 1948 (semifinals); 6 August 1948 (final)
- Competitors: 39 from 24 nations
- Winning time: 1:06.4

Medalists
1st place, gold medalist(s)		Allen Stack	United States
2nd place, silver medalist(s)		Bob Cowell	United States
3rd place, bronze medalist(s)		Georges Vallerey	France

The men's 100 metre backstroke event at the 1948 Olympic Games took place between 4 and 6 August, at the Empire Pool. This swimming event used the backstroke. Because an Olympic-size swimming pool is 50 metres long, this race consisted of two lengths of the pool.

== Results ==
=== Heats ===
The fastest two in each heat and the four fastest third-placed from across the heats advanced.

==== Heat 1 ====
Place	Swimmer	Time	Qual.
1	Jackie Wiid (RSA)	1:08.5	QQ
2	Kees Kievit (NED)	1:10.8	QQ
3	José Vegazzi (ARG)	1:13.8	
4	Francisco Calamita (ESP)	1:14.2	
5	Eric Jubb (CAN)	1:14.3	
6	Per-Olof Olsson (SWE)	1:14.6	
7	Khamlillal Shah (IND)	1:19.9	

==== Heat 2 ====
Place	Swimmer	Time	Qual.
1	Bruce Bourke (AUS)	1:11.3	QQ
2	Ilo da Fonseca (BRA)	1:11.9	QQ
3	Jiří Kovář (TCH)	1:12.9	
4	Carlos Noriega (URU)	1:15.0	
5	Martin Lundén (SWE)	1:15.6	
6	Tonatiuh Gutiérrez (MEX)	1:15.6	
7	Jaffar Ali Shah (PAK)	1:30.2	

==== Heat 3 ====
Place	Swimmer	Time	Qual.
1	John Brockaway (GBR)	1:09.2	QQ
2	Mario Chávez (ARG)	1:09.7	QQ
3	Clemente Mejía (MEX)	1:09.8	qq
4	Lucien Zins (FRA)	1:10.9	qq
5	Mário Simas (POR)	1:12.8	
6	Fritz Zwazl (AUT)	1:13.5	
7	Nikolaos Melanofeidis (GRE)	1:22.0	

==== Heat 4 ====
Place	Swimmer	Time	Qual.
1	Allen Stack (USA)	1:06.6	QQ
2	Bert Kinnear (GBR)	1:09.7	QQ
3	Paulo Silva (BRA)	1:10.0	qq
4	Tony Summers (GBR)	1:11.2	
5	Gyula Válent (HUN)	1:11.8	
6	Manuel Guerra (ESP)	1:14.8	
7	Prahtip Mitra (IND)	1:24.5	

==== Heat 5 ====
Place	Swimmer	Time	Qual.
1	Bob Cowell (USA)	1:06.9	QQ
2	René Pirolley (FRA)	1:11.4	QQ
3	Donald Shanks (BER)	1:17.1	
4	Dorri El-Said (EGY)	1:19.0	
5	Guðmundur Ingólfsson (ISL)	1:19.4	

==== Heat 6 ====
Place	Swimmer	Time	Qual.
1	Georges Vallerey, Jr. (FRA)	1:07.4	QQ
2	Howard Patterson (USA)	1:09.3	QQ
3	Hélio Silva (BRA)	1:10.5	qq
4	Federico Neumayer (ARG)	1:10.8	
5	Peter Mingie (CAN)	1:13.2	
6	Hans Blumer (SUI)	1:18.5	

=== Semifinals ===
The fastest three in each semi-final and the fastest from across the semi-finals advanced.

Semifinal 1

Place	Swimmer	Time	Qual.
1	Allen Stack (USA)	1:07.3	QQ
2	Georges Vallerey, Jr. (FRA)	1:08.3	QQ
3	John Brockaway (GBR)	1:09.1	QQ
4	Clemente Mejía (MEX)	1:09.6	qq
5	Mario Chávez (ARG)	1:09.8	qq
6	Paulo Silva (BRA)	1:09.8	
7	Kees Kievit (NED)	1:11.3	
8	Bruce Bourke (AUS)	1:11.4	

Semifinal 2

Place	Swimmer	Time	Qual.
1	Bob Cowell (USA)	1:08.5	QQ
2	Bert Kinnear (GBR)	1:09.2	QQ
3	Jackie Wiid (RSA)	1:09.2	QQ
4	Howard Patterson (USA)	1:09.9	
5	Hélio Silva (BRA)	1:10.1	
6	Lucien Zins (FRA)	1:11.5	
7	Ilo da Fonseca (BRA)	1:11.6	
8	René Pirolley (FRA)	1:12.9	

Key: Q = qualification by place in heat, q = qualification by overall place

=== Final ===
Rank	Athlete	Country	Time	Notes
1	Allen Stack	United States	1:06.4	
2	Bob Cowell	United States	1:06.5	
3	Georges Vallerey	France	1:07.8	
4	Mario Chávez	Argentina	1:09.0	
4	Clemente Mejía	Mexico	1:09.0	
6	Jackie Wiid	South Africa	1:09.1	
7	John Brockway	Great Britain	1:09.2	
8	Bert Kinnear	Great Britain	1:09.6	
