= Diving at the 1948 Summer Olympics – Men's 3 metre springboard =

Men's 3 metre springboard at the Games of the XIV Olympiad

Medalists
1st place, gold medalist(s)		Bruce Harlan	United States
2nd place, silver medalist(s)		Miller Anderson	United States
3rd place, bronze medalist(s)		Sammy Lee	United States

The men's 3 metre springboard, also reported as springboard diving, was one of four diving events on the diving at the 1948 Summer Olympics programme.

The competition, held on Friday 30 July and on Tuesday 3 August, was split into two sets of dives:

1. Compulsory dives
  Divers performed five pre-chosen dives (one from each category) – a running straight header forward, backward header with pike, running straight isander-half gainer reverse dive, backward spring and forward dive with pike, and running straight forward twist.
2. Facultative dives
  Divers performed five dives of their choice (one from each category and different from the compulsory).

Twenty-seven divers from 16 nations competed. Eddie Heron of Ireland competed in the preliminary round but withdrew along with the rest of the Irish Amateur Swimming Association squad in protest at FINA's refusal to allow swimmers from Northern Ireland to compete for the team.

== Results ==
Rank	Diver	Nation	Points
1st place, gold medalist(s)	Bruce Harlan	United States	163.64
2nd place, silver medalist(s)	Miller Anderson	United States	157.29
3rd place, bronze medalist(s)	Sammy Lee	United States	145.52
4	Joaquín Capilla	Mexico	141.79
5	Raymond Mulinghausen	France	126.55
6	Svante Johansson	Sweden	120.20
7	Kamal Ali Hassan	Egypt	119.90
8	Thomas Christiansen	Denmark	114.59
9	George Athans	Canada	114.13
10	Frank Gosling	Bermuda	113.98
11	Milton Busin	Brazil	113.86
12	Franz Worisch	Austria	112.15
13	Peter Heatly	Great Britain	111.73
14	Roger Heinkelé	France	110.78
15	Ismail Ahmed Ramzi	Egypt	110.18
16	David Norris	Australia	109.67
17	Diego Mariscal	Mexico	107.78
18	Charles Johnson	Great Britain	105.32
19	Wilhelm Lippa	Austria	103.18
20	Guy Hernandez	France	102.89
21	Gunnar Kemnitz	Brazil	102.22
22	Mohamed Ibrahim	Egypt	97.52
23	Peter Elliott	Great Britain	91.23
24	José Castillo	Cuba	84.81
25	Ernst Strupler	Switzerland	80.09
26	Günther Mund	Chile	68.08
27	Eddie Heron	Ireland	WD

== Sources ==
- Organising Committee for the XIV Olympiad London 1948 (1951). "The Official Report of the Organising Committee for the XIV Olympiad London 1948" (pdf). Organising Committee for the XIV Olympiad London 1948. pp. pp.637–9.
- Herman de Wael (24 May 2001). "Diving - men's springboard (London 1948)".
