= Bob Cowell =

Bob Cowell may refer to:

- Bobby Cowell (1922–1996), English footballer
- Bob Cowell (swimmer) (1924–1960), American swimmer

== See also ==
- Robert Cowell (born 1968), English racehorse trainer
