= Paulo Silva =

Paulo Silva may refer to:

- Giant Silva (Paulo César da Silva, born 1963), Brazilian former basketball player, mixed martial artist and wrestler
- Paulo da Silva (born 1980), Paraguayan football defender
- Paulo Silva (volleyball) (born 1963), Brazilian former volleyball player
- Paulo Emilio Silva (born 1969), Brazilian beach volleyball player
- Paulo Jorge Almeida Silva (born 1992), Portuguese footballer
- Paulo Silva (swimmer), backstroke swimmer from Brazil
- Paulo Silva (footballer) (born 1966), Brazilian footballer and manager
