= Tony Summers =

British swimmer

Personal information
- Full name: Thomas Philip Summers
- Nationality: British
- Born: 3 January 1924 Newport, South Wales
- Died: 21 November 2013 (aged 89) Churchstoke, Powys

Sport
- Sport: Swimming
- Strokes: Backstroke
- Club: City of Newport Swimming & Waterpolo Club

Thomas Phillip "Tony" Summers (3 January 1924 – 21 November 2013) was a British competition swimmer and Olympian. He was born in Newport, South Wales, the son of Edwin Charles Summers. His grandfather was the bonesetter A. E. Kennard.

From an early age he was a well-known figure in Newport Swimming Club, becoming known as Tony the Diver and featuring in a 1930 British Pathè film. During World War II, Summers joined 136 Squadron RAF in 1944 (later 152 Squadron) and flew Spitfires and Tempests in India and the Far East. On his release from the RAF in 1947, Summers started training for the London Olympics of 1948. He had originally aimed to swim in the Olympics of 1940 and 1944, but war had intervened. He represented Great Britain for Men's 100 Metre Backstroke, where his heat was won by the eventual gold medallist, Allen Stack.

Summers worked as an engineer for the Air Ministry and for British Nuclear Fuels, before joining the Forestry Commission where he became Commissioning Engineer for Wales. He continued to swim competitively until shortly before his death and achieved many Welsh and British records in older age groups. Summers died on 21 November 2013. He was survived by his daughter and two grandchildren.
