= Cláudio Kestener =

Brazilian swimmer (born 1961)

Personal information
- Full name: Cláudio Mamede Kestener
- Born: December 20, 1961 (age 64) São Paulo, São Paulo, Brazil
- Height: 1.80 m (5 ft 11 in)
- Weight: 70 kg (150 lb)

Sport
- Sport: Swimming
- Strokes: Butterfly

Cláudio Mamede Kestener (born December 20, 1961, in São Paulo) is a former international butterfly swimmer from Brazil, who participated in a Summer Olympics for his native country.

He is the son of Rolf Kestener, who participated in the 1948 Summer Olympics, in London.

He is currently an engineer at the São Paulo Metro and participates in competitions in the master category by Esporte Clube Pinheiros and also in the World Games of the CSIT – International Workers and Amateurs in Sports Confederation.

Cláudio Kestener started swimming at the Pinheiros school and, at the age of seven, he started to compete; at age 16 he participated in his first international competitions. In 1980, at the Latin Cup in Spain, he broke the Brazilian record for the 100-meter butterfly.

At the 1980 Summer Olympics, in Moscow, he finished 8th in the 4×100-metre medley final, breaking the South American record, together with Rômulo Arantes, Sérgio Pinto Ribeiro and Jorge Fernandes. He also swam the 100m and 200m butterfly, not reaching the finals.

In 1981 he was the Brazilian record holder of the 100-metre butterfly, with a time of 57.12 seconds.

He started engineering school the same year he returned from the Moscow Olympics and decided to dedicate himself to his studies. During college, he participated in the University Games and gradually moved away from competitive swimming.
