= Rolf Kestener =

Brazilian swimmer (1930–1998)

Personal information
- Full name: Rolf Egon Kestener
- Nationality: Brazil
- Born: 8 July 1930 São Paulo, São Paulo, Brazil
- Died: 8 October 1998 (aged 68)

Sport
- Sport: Swimming
- Strokes: Butterfly
Medal record
Men's Water polo
Pan American Games
Bronze medal – third place	1955 Mexico City	Water polo

Rolf Egon Kestener (8 July 1930 – 8 October 1998) was a former international freestyle swimmer from Brazil who participated in a Summer Olympics for his native country. He was born in São Paulo. His son, Cláudio Kestener, participated in the 1980 Summer Olympics, in Moscow.

He was one of the founders of Paineiras do Morumby club.

At the 1948 Summer Olympics, in London, he finished 8th in the 4×200-metre freestyle final, along with Aram Boghossian, Willy Otto Jordan and Sérgio Rodrigues. He also swam the 1500-metre freestyle, not reaching the finals.

In the 1950s, he started to compete for the Brazilian water polo team and was on the South American champion team in 1954.

At the 1955 Pan American Games in Mexico City, he won the bronze medal in the Water Polo. He broke two times the Brazilian record in the 1500-metre freestyle, both in London at the 1948 Summer Olympics.

He was also a diving athlete.
