= Calamita (surname) =

Calamita is a surname. Notable people with the surname include:

- Francisco Calamita (1922–2007), Spanish swimmer
- Marco Calamita (born 1983), Italian footballer and manager
