= Jiří Kovář (swimmer) =

Czech swimmer

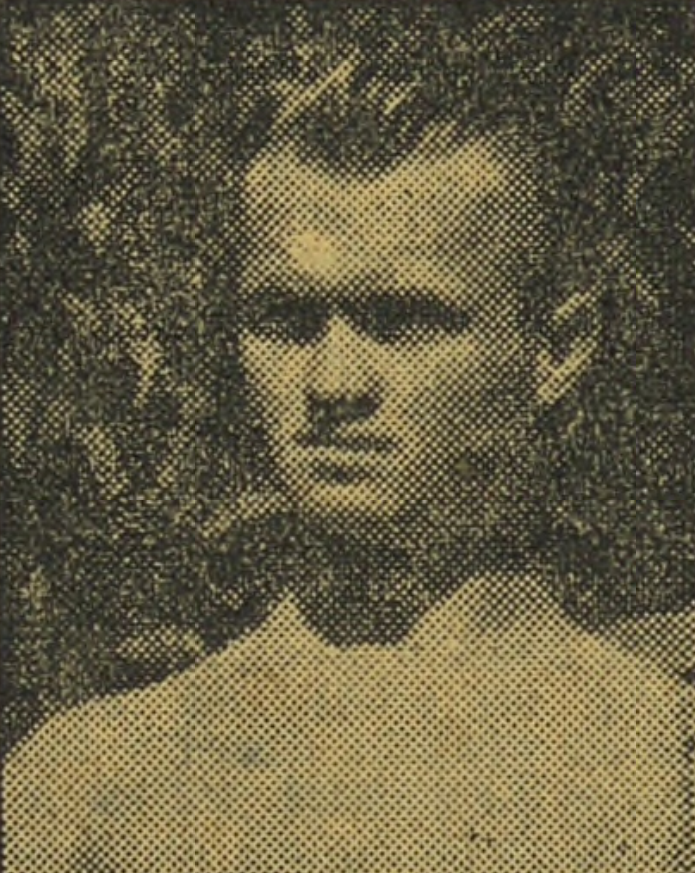

Personal information
- Full name: Jiří Kovář
- Born: 1925
- Died: 10 June 2008 (aged 82)

Sport
- Sport: Swimming
Medal record
Men's swimming
Representing Czechoslovakia
European Championships
Bronze medal – third place	1947 Monte Carlo	100 m backstroke

Jiří Kovář (1925 – 10 June 2008) was a Czech swimmer. He competed in the men's 100 metre backstroke at the 1948 Summer Olympics.
