= 1947 European Aquatics Championships =

Water sport competitions

6th European Aquatics Championships
- Host city: Monte Carlo
- Country: Monaco
- Events: 16
- Opening: 10 September 1947
- Closing: 14 September 1947

The 1947 LEN European Aquatics Championships were held 10–14 September 1947 in Monte Carlo, Monaco.

== Medal table ==
Rank	Nation	Gold	Silver	Bronze	Total
1	France	6	1	1	8
2	Denmark	5	0	1	6
3	Hungary	1	5	4	10
4	Sweden	1	4	0	5
5	Great Britain	1	2	2	5
5	Netherlands	1	2	2	5
7	Italy	1	0	0	1
8	Austria	0	1	1	2
8	Yugoslavia	0	1	1	2
10	Belgium	0	0	2	2
10	Czechoslovakia	0	0	2	2
Totals (11 entries)		16	16	16	48

== Medal summary ==
=== Diving ===
Men's events

Event	Gold		Silver		Bronze	
3 m springboard	Roger Heinkele; France	126.71	Svante Johansson; Sweden	118.88	László Hidvégi; Hungary	114.50
10 m platform	Thomas Christiansen; Denmark	105.55	Lennart Brunnhage; Sweden	98.85	Louis Marchant; Great Britain	95.32

Women's events

Event	Gold		Silver		Bronze	
3 m springboard	Madeleine Moreau; France	100.43	Alma Staudinger; Austria	90.67	Jeannette Aubert-Pinel; France	86.78
10 m platform	Nicole Pellissard; France	60.03	Eileen Szagot; Hungary	59.86	Alma Staudinger; Austria	58.02

=== Swimming ===
Men's events

Event	Gold		Silver		Bronze	
100 m freestyle	Alexandre Jany; France	56.9	Per-Olof Olsson; Sweden	58.8	Elemér Szathmáry; Hungary	59.6
400 m freestyle	Alexandre Jany; France	4:35.2	György Mitró; Hungary	4:50.4	Miloslav Bartušek; Czechoslovakia	4:51.4
1500 m freestyle	György Mitró; Hungary	19:28.0	Ferenc Vörös; Hungary	20:07.0	Marijan Stipetić; Yugoslavia	20:08.5
100 m backstroke	Georges Vallerey; France	1:07.6	Gyula Valent; Hungary	1:10.5	Jirí Kovár; Czechoslovakia	1:10.5
200 m breaststroke	Roy Romain; Great Britain	2:40.1	Anton Cerer; Yugoslavia	2:41.6	Sándor Németh; Hungary	2:46.2
4 × 200 m freestyle relay	Sweden; Per-Olof Olsson; Martin Lundén; Per-Olof Östrand; Olle Johansson	9:00.5	France; Alexandre Jany; Charles Babey; Georges Vallerey; Jean Vallerey	9:00.7	Hungary; Imre Nyéki; Géza Kadas; György Mitro; Elemer Szathmary	9:01.0

Women's events

Event	Gold		Silver		Bronze	
100 m freestyle	Fritzie Nathansen; Denmark	1:07.8	Hannie Termeulen; Netherlands	1:08.1	Greta Andersen; Denmark	1:08.3
400 m freestyle	Karen Margrete Harup; Denmark	5:18.2	Catherine Gibson; Great Britain	5:19.8	Fernande Caroen; Belgium	5:20.9
100 m backstroke	Karen Margrete Harup; Denmark	1:15.9	Catherine Gibson; Great Britain	1:16.5	Iet van Feggelen; Netherlands	1:18.0
200 m breaststroke	Nel van Vliet; Netherlands	2:56.6	Éva Székely; Hungary	2:57.9	Jannie de Groot; Netherlands	3:00.5
4 × 100 m freestyle relay	Denmark; Elvi Svendsen; Karen Harup; Greta Andersen; Fritze Nathansen	4:32.3	Netherlands; Margot Marsman; Irma Heijting-Schuhmacher; Marie-Louise Linssen-Vaessen; Hannie Termeulen	4:36.0	Great Britain; Catherine Gibson; Lillian Preece; Nancy Riach; Margaret Wellington	4:37.1

=== Water polo ===
Event	Gold	Silver	Bronze
Men's tournament	Italy	Sweden	Belgium

== See also ==
- List of European Championships records in swimming
