= Peter Mingie =

Canadian swimmer

Personal information
- Born: 22 June 1931 Toronto, Ontario, Canada
- Died: 24 October 1999 (aged 68)

Sport
- Sport: Swimming

Peter Mingie (22 June 1931 – 24 October 1999) was a Canadian swimmer. He competed in the men's 100 metre backstroke at the 1948 Summer Olympics.
