= Marie Corridon =

American swimmer (1930–2010)

Personal information
- Full name: Marie Louise Corridon
- National team: United States
- Born: February 5, 1930 Washington, D.C., U.S.
- Died: May 26, 2010 (aged 80) Norwalk, Connecticut, U.S.

Sport
- Sport: Swimming
- Strokes: Freestyle
- Club: Women's Swimming Association
Medal record
Women's swimming
Representing the United States
Olympic Games
Gold medal – first place	1948 London	4×100 m freestyle relay

Marie Louise Corridon Mortell (February 5, 1930 – May 26, 2010) was an American competition swimmer and 1948 Olympic champion.

Corridon was born in Washington, D.C., but moved with her family to Norwalk, Connecticut, when her father started his medical practice there. She attended Sacred Heart Academy in Stamford, Connecticut. Marie learned to swim at the age of 5 at the Longshore Club in Westport, Connecticut and demonstrated natural ability. She was the Amateur Athletic Union (AAU) national champion in the 100-yard freestyle in 1948, and set a new U.S. record in the event. She won the 100-yard freestyle national championship again in 1950.

== 1948 Olympics ==
Corridon competed at the 1948 Summer Olympics in London, where she won a gold medal as the lead-off swimmer of the first-place U.S. team in the women's 4×100-meter freestyle relay. Corridon, together with her teammates Thelma Kalama, Brenda Helser and Ann Curtis, set a new Olympic record in the event final of 4:29.2. With just 15 metres to go Ann Curtis, the last American swimmer on the relay, overtook the third place Dutch swimmer and with the crowd cheering loudly edged closer to Fritze Carstensen, the second place swimmer for the Danish team. In a very close heat, in an exhausting final sprint, Curtis touched the wall first passing the second place Danish swimmer, and breaking the Olympic record. Curtis' 100-meter time of 1:04.4, was the fastest ever recorded, but it could not be made official as only the first swimmer's time in a relay is ever made an official time. The American team finished only .4 seconds ahead of the second place silver medal team from Denmark.

Individually, she also competed in the women's 100-meter freestyle, but did not advance to the final. After the Olympics, Corridon attended Marymount Manhattan College. She later worked for Avery Brundage, the long-time head of the United States Olympic Committee, and later served as an executive secretary at the Walter Reed Army Hospital. After returning to Norwalk, she worked in public relations at the Norwalk Hospital.

== Personal life ==
Corridon married William Edward Mortell, and had a family of seven children. She died in Norwalk, Connecticut, on May 26, 2010, at the age of 80.

== See also ==
- List of Olympic medalists in swimming (women)
