= Edith de Oliveira =

Brazilian swimmer

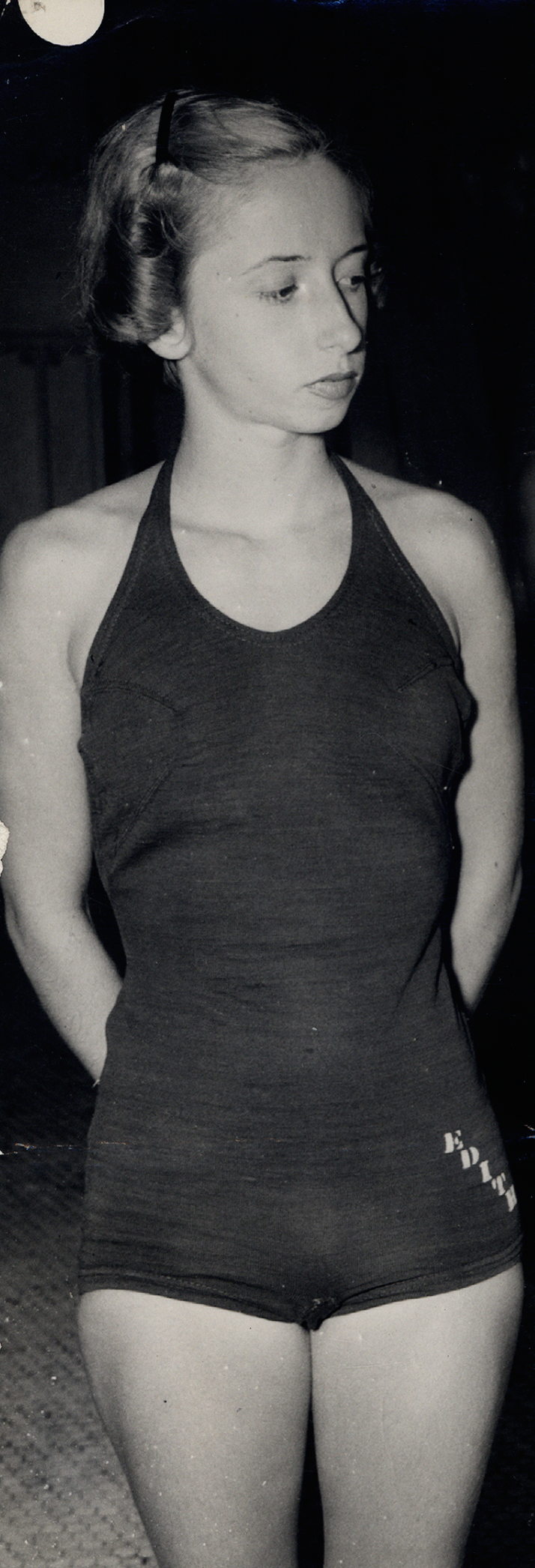

Personal information
- Full name: Edith Grobade de Oliveira
- Born: 16 November 1928 Brazil
- Died: 29 December 1964 (aged 36)

Sport
- Sport: Swimming
- Strokes: Backstroke
Medal record
Women's swimming
Representing Brazil

Edith Grobade de Oliveira (16 November 1928 – 29 December 1964) was an Olympic backstroke swimmer from Brazil, who competed at two Summer Olympics for her native country. At 19 years old, she was at the 1948 Summer Olympics, in London, where she swam the 100-metre backstroke, not reaching the finals. At 23 years old, she was at the 1952 Summer Olympics, in Helsinki, where she swam the 100-metre backstroke, not reaching the finals.
