= Lennart Brunnhage =

Swedish diver

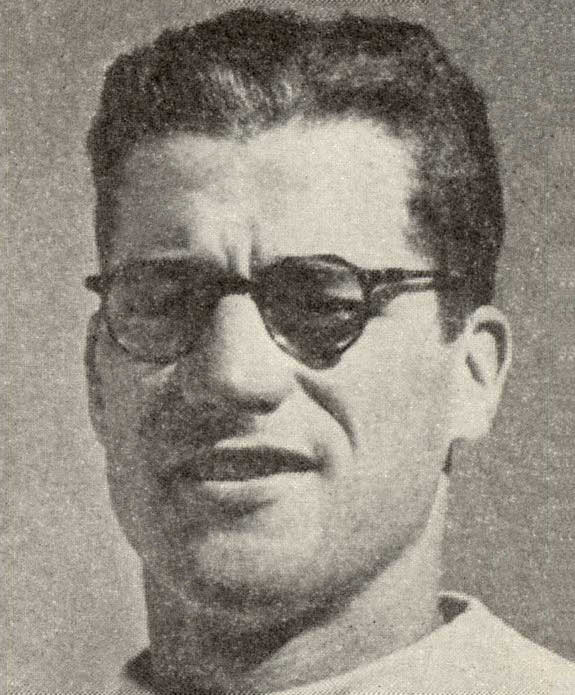

Personal information
- Born: 25 August 1915 Kungshamn, Sweden
- Died: 29 March 1999 (aged 83) Lidingö, Stockholm, Sweden

Sport
- Sport: Diving
- Club: SoIK Hellas, Nacka
Medal record
Representing Sweden
European Championships
Silver medal – second place	1947 Monte Carlo	10 m platform

Knut Lennart Herbert Brunnhage (25 August 1915 – 29 March 1999) was a Swedish diver who won a silver medal in the 10 m platform at the 1947 European Championships. Next year he finished fourth in this event at the 1948 Summer Olympics.
