= Guðmundur Ingólfsson =

Icelandic swimmer

Personal information
- Born: 28 April 1929 Reykjavík, Iceland
- Died: 13 August 1987 (aged 58) London, England

Sport
- Sport: Swimming

Guðmundur Ármann Ingólfsson (28 April 1929 – 13 August 1987) was an Icelandic swimmer. He competed in the men's 100 metre backstroke at the 1948 Summer Olympics.
