= José Vegazzi =

Argentine swimmer

Personal information
- Full name: José Abelardo Vegazzi
- Nationality: Argentina
- Born: 26 February 1929
- Died: 7 January 2005 (aged 75)

Sport
- Sport: Swimming
- Strokes: Backstroke

José Abelardo Vegazzi (26 February 1929 – 7 January 2005) was an Argentine swimmer who competed at the 1948 Summer Olympics in the 100 m backstroke.
