= Charles Johnson (diver) =

British diver

Personal information
- Nationality: British
- Born: 23 April 1913; Uxbridge, England
- Died: 7 July 2000 (aged 87); Worthing, England

Sport
- Sport: Diving

Charles Johnson (23 April 1913 – 7 July 2000) was a British diver. He competed in the men's 3 metre springboard event at the 1948 Summer Olympics.
