= Maria Oeyen =

Belgian swimmer (1930–2018)

Personal information
- Nationality: Belgian
- Born: 31 August 1930 Antwerp, Belgium
- Died: 24 April 2018 (aged 87)

Sport
- Sport: Swimming

Maria Oeyen (31 August 1930 – 24 April 2018) was a Belgian swimmer. She competed in the women's 4 × 100 metre freestyle relay at the 1948 Summer Olympics.
