= Swimming at the 1951 Pan American Games – Men's 200 metre breaststroke =

Men's 200 metre breaststroke at the 1951 Pan American Games
- Venue: -
- Dates: March 6 (preliminaries and finals)

Medalists
Gold medal	Héctor Domínguez	Argentina
Silver medal	Willy Otto Jordan	Brazil
Bronze medal	Bowen Stassforth	United States

The men's 200 metre breaststroke competition of the swimming events at the 1951 Pan American Games took place on 6 March.

This race consisted of four lengths of the pool, all in breaststroke.

== Results ==
All times are in minutes and seconds.

KEY:	q	Fastest non-qualifiers	Q	Qualified	GR	Games record	NR	National record	PB	Personal best	SB	Seasonal best

=== Final ===
The final was held on March 6.

Rank	Name	Nationality	Time	Notes
1st place, gold medalist(s)	Héctor Domínguez	Argentina	2:43.8	
2nd place, silver medalist(s)	Willy Otto Jordan	Brazil	2:47.3	
3rd place, bronze medalist(s)	Bowen Stassforth	United States	2:47.6	
4	-	-	-	
5	-	-	-	
6	Adhemar Grijó Filho	Brazil	-	
7	-	-	-	
8	-	-	-	
