= José Castillo (diver) =

Cuban diver (1911–??)

Personal information
- Nationality: Cuban
- Born: 6 March 1911

Sport
- Sport: Diving

José Castillo (born 6 March 1911, date of death unknown) was a Cuban diver. He competed in the men's 3 metre springboard event at the 1948 Summer Olympics.
