= Willy Otto Jordan =

Brazilian swimmer (1920–2019)

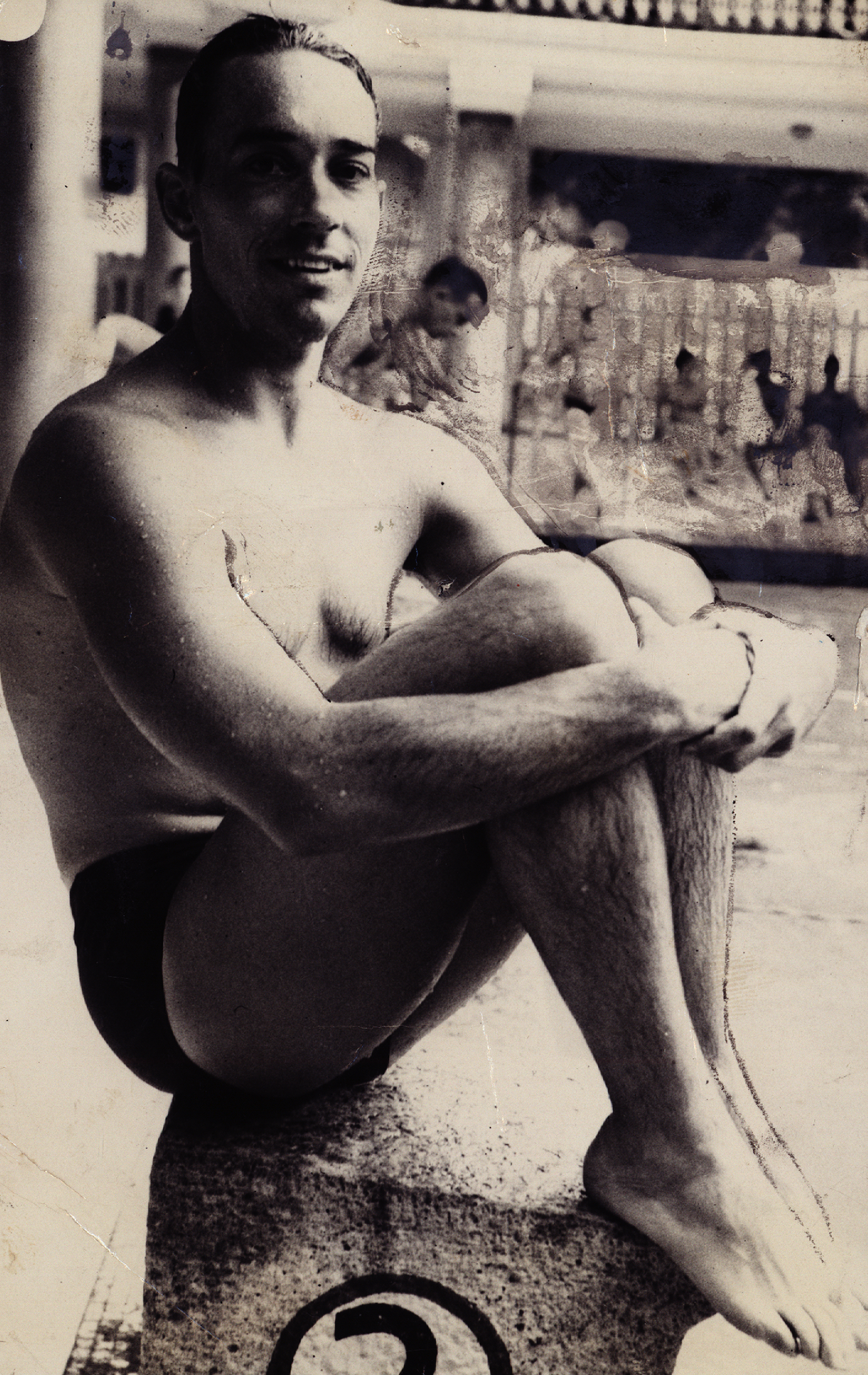

Personal information
- Nationality: Brazil
- Born: 15 September 1920 São Paulo, São Paulo, Brazil
- Died: 7 October 2019 (aged 99)

Sport
- Sport: Swimming
- Strokes: Breaststroke, freestyle
Medal record
Men's swimming
Representing Brazil
Pan American Games
Silver medal – second place	1951 Buenos Aires	200 m breaststroke

Willy Otto Jordan (15 September 1920 – 7 October 2019) was a Brazilian swimmer. Born in São Paulo, he took up swimming in 1932 at the age of 12 and, by the end of the decade, was one of the most prominent names in the city's blooming swimming movement. In 1940 he broke the South American records in the 200-metre freestyle and the 100-metre breaststroke as well as the Brazilian record in the 100-metre freestyle while competing against touring swimmers from Japan, including Olympic medalists Masanori Yusa and Tetsuo Hamuro. Later that year he was national champion in the breaststroke and relay events, as well as the 100m freestyle, for the first time.

Jordan was offered a full scholarship to Yale University during World War II but declined it because of his support for, and ancestry from, Germany. He continued swimming and improved several South American records during the war years while working for his father's company. He resumed participation in international tournaments following the conflict and competed in the 1948 Summer Olympics in London. Participating in two events, he finished sixth in a field of thirty-two swimmers in the men's 200-metre breaststroke and eighth among fourteen nations in the men's 4×200-metre freestyle relay, alongside Sérgio Rodrigues, Rolf Kestener, and Aram Boghossian. At the 1951 Pan American Games he won a silver medal in the inaugural 200-metre breaststroke. He was made head of Brazil's swimming delegation to the 1952 Summer Olympics in Helsinki, although he did not participate in any events, and retired from active competition in 1954.
