= Fritz Zwazl =

Austrian swimmer

Personal information
- Born: 26 June 1926

Sport
- Sport: Swimming

Fritz Zwazl (born 26 June 1926) is an Austrian former swimmer. He competed in the men's 100 metre backstroke at the 1948 Summer Olympics.
