= Maria Huybrechts =

Belgian swimmer (1930–2023)

Personal information
- Nationality: Belgian
- Born: 5 July 1930 Antwerp, Belgium
- Died: 15 September 2023 (aged 93) Kapellen, Belgium

Sport
- Sport: Swimming

Maria Huybrechts (5 July 1930 – 15 September 2023) was a Belgian swimmer. She competed in the women's 4 × 100 metre freestyle relay at the 1948 Summer Olympics. Huybrechts died in Kapellen on 15 September 2023, at the age of 93.
