= Swimming at the 1951 Pan American Games – Women's 200 metre freestyle =

Women's 200 metre freestyle at the 1951 Pan American Games
- Venue: -
- Dates: March 2 (preliminaries and finals)

Medalists
Gold medal	Ana María Schultz	Argentina
Silver medal	Betty Brey	United States
Bronze medal	Eileen Holt	Argentina

The women's 200 metre freestyle competition of the swimming events at the 1951 Pan American Games took place on 2 March.

This race consisted of four lengths of the pool, all in freestyle.

== Results ==
All times are in minutes and seconds.

KEY:	q	Fastest non-qualifiers	Q	Qualified	GR	Games record	NR	National record	PB	Personal best	SB	Seasonal best

=== Final ===
The final was held on March 2.

Rank	Name	Nationality	Time	Notes
1st place, gold medalist(s)	Ana María Schultz	Argentina	2:32.4	
2nd place, silver medalist(s)	Betty Brey	United States	2:33.3	
3rd place, bronze medalist(s)	Eileen Holt	Argentina	2:36.5	
4	Piedade Coutinho	Brazil	-	
5	Talita Rodrigues	Brazil	-	
6	Jackie LaVine	United States	2:49.1	
7	-	-	-	
8	-	-	-	
