= Mario Chávez =

Argentine swimmer

Mario Chaves
Personal information
- Full name: Ernesto Mario Chaves Paloma
- Nationality: Argentina
- Born: 8 June 1929 Florentino Ameghino, Buenos Aires, Argentina
- Died: 24 August 2007 (aged 78) Buenos Aires, Argentina

Sport
- Sport: Swimming
- Strokes: Backstroke

Ernesto Mario Chaves Paloma (8 June 1929 – 24 August 2007) was an Argentine swimmer who competed at the 1948 Summer Olympics in the 100 m backstroke reaching the final and finishing 4th.
