= Hans Blumer =

Swiss swimmer (1928–2021)

Personal information
- Full name: Hans Blumer
- Born: 19 June 1928
- Died: 3 March 2021 (aged 92)

Sport
- Sport: Swimming

Hans Blumer (19 June 1928 – 3 March 2021) was a Swiss swimmer. He competed in the men's 100 metre backstroke at the 1948 Summer Olympics.
