= Mário Simas =

Portuguese swimmer

Personal information
- Born: 16 February 1922
- Died: 3 January 2015 (aged 92)

Sport
- Sport: Swimming

Mário Simas (16 February 1922 – 3 January 2015) was a Portuguese swimmer. He competed in the men's 100 metre backstroke at the 1948 Summer Olympics.
