= Nikolaos Melanofeidis =

Greek swimmer

Personal information
- Full name: Nikolaos Melanofeidis

Sport
- Sport: Swimming

Nikolaos Melanofeidis is a Greek former swimmer. He competed in the men's 100 metre backstroke and the water polo tournament at the 1948 Summer Olympics.
