= Bert Kinnear =

British swimmer (1923–2011)

Personal information
- Nationality: British (Scottish)
- Born: 24 October 1923 Arbroath, Scotland
- Died: 10 January 2011 (aged 87) Aberdeen, Scotland

Sport
- Sport: Swimming
Medal record
Men's swimming
Representing Scotland
British Empire Games
Bronze medal – third place	1950 Auckland	110 yd backstroke

Albert David Kinnear (24 October 1923 – 10 January 2011) was a British swimmer. He competed in the men's 100 metre backstroke at the 1948 Summer Olympics.
