= Maria Van Den Brande =

Belgian swimmer (1925–2016)

Personal information
- Full name: Maria Antonia Van den Brande
- Nationality: Belgian
- Born: 23 August 1925 Antwerp, Belgium
- Died: 28 August 2016 (aged 91) Leuven, Belgium

Sport
- Sport: Swimming

Maria Antonia Van den Brande (23 August 1925 – 28 August 2016) was a Belgian swimmer. She competed in the women's 4 × 100 metre freestyle relay at the 1948 Summer Olympics. Van den Brande died in Leuven on 28 August 2016, five days after her 91st birthday.
