= Marie Foucher-Creteau =

French swimmer

Personal information
- Full name: Marie Foucher-Creteau
- Nationality: French
- Born: 26 February 1925
- Died: 17 January 2015 (aged 89)

Sport
- Sport: Swimming

Marie Foucher-Creteau (26 February 1925 – 17 January 2015) was a French swimmer. She competed in the women's 4 × 100 metre freestyle relay at the 1948 Summer Olympics.
