= Enriqueta Duarte =

Argentine swimmer (1929–2025)

Enriqueta Duarte OLY
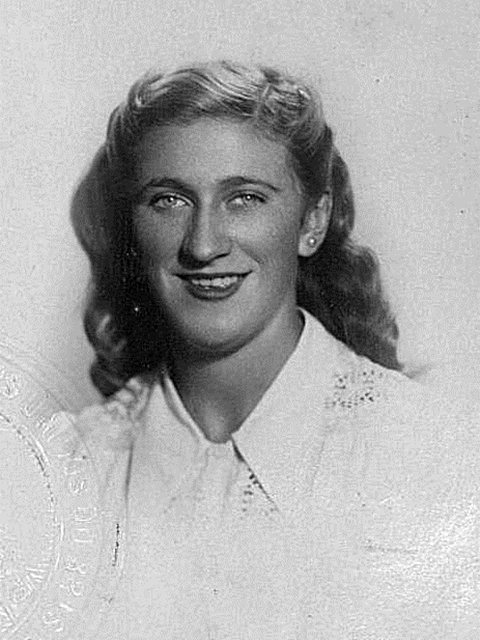
- Duarte in 1948

Personal information
- Born: 26 February 1929 Palermo, Buenos Aires, Argentina
- Died: 3 July 2025 (aged 96)

Sport
- Sport: Swimming
- Strokes: Freestyle

Enriqueta Corina Duarte Ibarra García (26 February 1929 – 3 July 2025) was an Argentine swimmer. From Buenos Aires, she was successful from a young age and won many national championships in the 1940s. She competed at the 1948 Summer Olympics in London in three events. Three years later, she became the first Latin American woman to swim the English Channel on 16 August 1951. Duarte later competed in masters swimming events and won many national and international masters championships.

== Biography ==
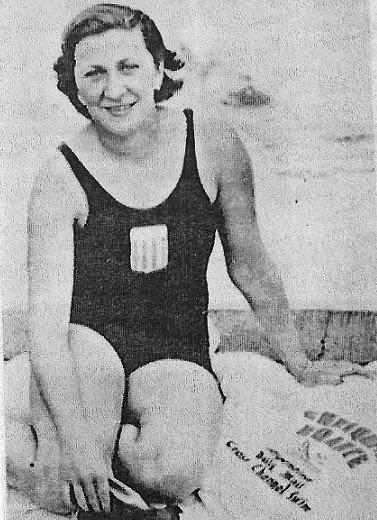
Duarte after swimming across the English Channel

Enriqueta Corina Duarte Ibarra García was born on 26 February 1929 in Palermo, Buenos Aires, Argentina. Her father, Don Roque Duarte, was a sportsman and journalist. She learned to swim her two favorite strokes at age nine at the Club Obras Sanitarias de la Nación, where her father worked. She won her first tournament in 1942 at age 12 at Obras Sanitarias and the club's coach was impressed enough that he asked her parents to consider having her train with the club team.

Duarte joined the Obras Sanitarias team and attended the school Escuela Normal Superior Presidente Roque Sáenz Peña, where she studied to become a teacher. She captained her school's swimming team and won intercollegiate championships in 1944, 1945, and 1946. She was the national freestyle swimming champion in the 100 metres, 200m, 400m and 800m while also winning several relay titles. She broke several national records in these events. She first competed internationally in 1946 at the South American Championships.

Duarte became a teacher after graduating while continuing to train as a swimmer. In 1948, she was selected to participate at that year's Summer Olympics in London in three events. She finished 32nd in the 100m freestyle, 18th in the 400m freestyle, and was part of a team in the 4×100 freestyle relay that placed ninth. She suffered from an ear issue in 1949 and thought her swimming career was over, so she began competing in fencing. She later returned to swimming and participated at the 1950 South American Championships. In 1951, she started studying law at the University of Buenos Aires.

That year, Duarte heard of swimmer Antonio Abertondo crossing the English Channel and became interested in attempting to do it herself, even though she had never before competed in open water swimming. She was coached by Ernesto Caraciolo and participated in a swim of the Channel organized by the Daily Mail on 16 August 1951. She successfully crossed the Channel with a time of 13 hours, 26 minutes, placing third at the event and becoming the first Latin American woman to cross the Channel, setting the South American record, surpassing Abertondo.

During the Revolución Libertadora in the mid-1950s, Duarte was an activist for Juan Perón and was persecuted, thus having to live several years in exile in London. She retired from swimming to take care of her three children before returning in 1963 to swim the Nahuel Huapi Lake. Although she was advised by organizers to attempt the swim on a different day due to unfavorable conditions, she "ignored them and jumped into the water anyway" before realizing she had dived into the wrong place in the lake. She swam 8 km (5.0 mi) to what was supposed to be the starting point, then swam a further 10 km (6.2 mi) to complete her crossing. Duarte later crossed the Nahuel Huapi Lake four more times and also swam the Lácar Lake in 1965.

Duarte also competed in masters swimming events, winning national, South American, Pan American and world championships between 1985 and 2006. She moved to Venezuela in 1975 due to her poor relationship with her husband, telling La Nación that he "lied to me [and] tried to kill me by causing a gas leak in the house". While in Venezuela, she crossed the Orinoco and Caroní Rivers in a competition in 1998, finishing first in her category against 600 others. She returned to Argentina in 2005. From 2006, she organized an annual swimming competition across the Nahuel Huapi Lake.

Duarte was honored with an award from the Argentine Senate and received the Sports Achievement Award from the Chamber of Deputies in 2007. She was named an "Outstanding Sports Personality" in the city of Buenos Aires and the municipality of Tigre in 2011. She died on 3 July 2025 at the age of 96.
