= Thelma Kalama =

American swimmer (1931–1999)

Personal information
- Full name: Thelma Hildegarde Kalama
- Nickname: "Keko"
- National team: United States
- Born: March 24, 1931 Honolulu, Territory of Hawaii
- Died: May 17, 1999 (aged 68) Honolulu, Hawaii, U.S.
- Spouse: John Paio Aiu

Sport
- Sport: Swimming
- Strokes: Freestyle
- Club: Hawaii Swim Club
- Coach: Soichi Sakamoto
Medal record
Women's swimming
Representing the United States
Olympic Games
Gold medal – first place	1948 London	4×100 m freestyle relay

Thelma H. Kalama (March 24, 1931 – May 17, 1999), later known by her married name Thelma Aiu after 1960, was an American competition swimmer, 1948 London Olympic gold medalist in the freestyle relay, and a marine veteran. She was the second woman to represent Hawaii in the Olympics.

Thelma was born the fifth sibling in a large family to Abraham Ka'aumoana Kalama, a U.S. Naval veteran, and Helena Z. Kalama, in Honolulu on March 24, 1931. She began her swimming career in early 1946, at the age of 15, and began competing the same year, taking a first in the 50-meter freestyle with a time of 34.2 seconds at her first Keo Nakama Meet in Honolulu on July 10, 1946. She attended and competed for Honolulu's Kaimuki High School where she swam a second place 100-yard freestyle time of 1:09 in August, 1947 as a sixteen year old at the Keo Nakama Meet, and a third place in the 200-meter freestyle. She later set Prep Records in the 100-yard breaststroke of 1:21.2 in 1949, and the 220-yard freestyle of 2:38 in 1949.

During her High School swimming career, she also trained and competed for Hall of Fame Coach Soichi Sakamoto's Hawaii Swim Club in Honolulu, an outstanding program that produced several Olympic medalists. In June, 1951, swimming for the Hawaii Swim Club, she improved her time in the 100-meter freestyle to a time of 1:07.5 at the annual Keo Nakama Swim Meet in Honolulu.

== Swimming career highlights ==
Among her most notable swimming achievements, she won three National AAU outdoor titles, which included titles in the 100-yard freestyle in 1949, and in the 400-meter or 440-yard freestyle in 1949 and 1950. She set an American record for the 400-meter freestyle. In late August 1949, she helped lead the Hawaii Swim Club to the National AAU Team championship in San Antonio, Texas, and again at the National AAU swim championships in High Point North Carolina in late August 1950. Kalama scored the third highest number of points at the National AAU meet in 1950, taking a first in the 400-meter freestyle, a second in the 800-meter freestyle where she led until the last three meters, and a third in the 100-meter backstroke.

== 1948 Olympics ==
On June 20, 1948, a committee unanimously selected her and Honolulu native Bill Smith, a fellow Hawaii swim club member, to attend the Olympic trials in Detroit accompanied by her Coach Soichi Sakamoto, and his wife. Kalama took fourth place in both the 100 and 400-meter freestyle events at the U.S. trials, helping her to gain a spot on the Olympic relay team. the Olympics.

She competed at the 1948 Summer Olympics in London, where she won a gold medal in the women's 4×100-meter freestyle relay, together with her teammates Marie Corridon, Brenda Helser and Ann Curtis. The U.S. relay team set a new Olympic record of 4:29.2 in the event final.

In later life, Kalama joined the marines, and attained the rank of sergeant. Enlisting in October 1951, she did her basic training at Quantico, Virginia as a member of Platoon 29-A, 3rd Battalion, and continued swimming during much of her training. She attended college at the University of Miami, Ohio.

On July 30, 1960, she married Staff Sargent John Paio Aiu, who predeceased her in 2010.

She died May 17, 1999, at Queens Hospital, now known as Queen's Medical Center, in Honolulu.

Kalama was inducted into the Hawaii Sports Hall of Fame in 1998, and the Hawaii Swimming Hall of Fame as a posthumous member of its first class of honorees in 2002.

== See also ==
- List of Olympic medalists in swimming (women)
