= Alma Staudinger =

Austrian diver

Personal information
- Nationality: Austrian
- Born: 19 August 1921
- Died: 10 October 2017 (aged 96)

Sport
- Sport: Diving
Medal record
Women's diving
Representing Austria
European Championships
Silver medal – second place	1947 Monte Carlo	3 m springboard
Silver medal – second place	1950 Vienna	10 m platform
Bronze medal – third place	1947 Monte Carlo	10 m platform

Alma Staudinger (19 August 1921 – 10 October 2017) was an Austrian diver. She competed at the 1948 Summer Olympics.
