= Mohamed Ibrahim (diver) =

Egyptian diver

Personal information
- Nationality: Egyptian

Sport
- Sport: Diving

Mohamed Ibrahim was an Egyptian diver. He competed in the men's 3 metre springboard event at the 1948 Summer Olympics.
