= Carlos Noriega (swimmer) =

Uruguayan swimmer (1922–1991)

Personal information
- Full name: Carlos Francisco Noriega Pons
- Born: 19 June 1922 Río Negro, Uruguay
- Died: September 1991 (aged 69)

Sport
- Sport: Swimming

Carlos Francisco Noriega Pons (Note: In this Hispanic American name, the first or paternal surname is Noriega and the second or maternal family name is Pons.) (19 June 1922 – September 1991) was a Uruguayan swimmer. He competed in the men's 100 metre backstroke at the 1948 Summer Olympics.
