= Federico Neumayer =

Argentine swimmer

Federico Enrique Neumayer
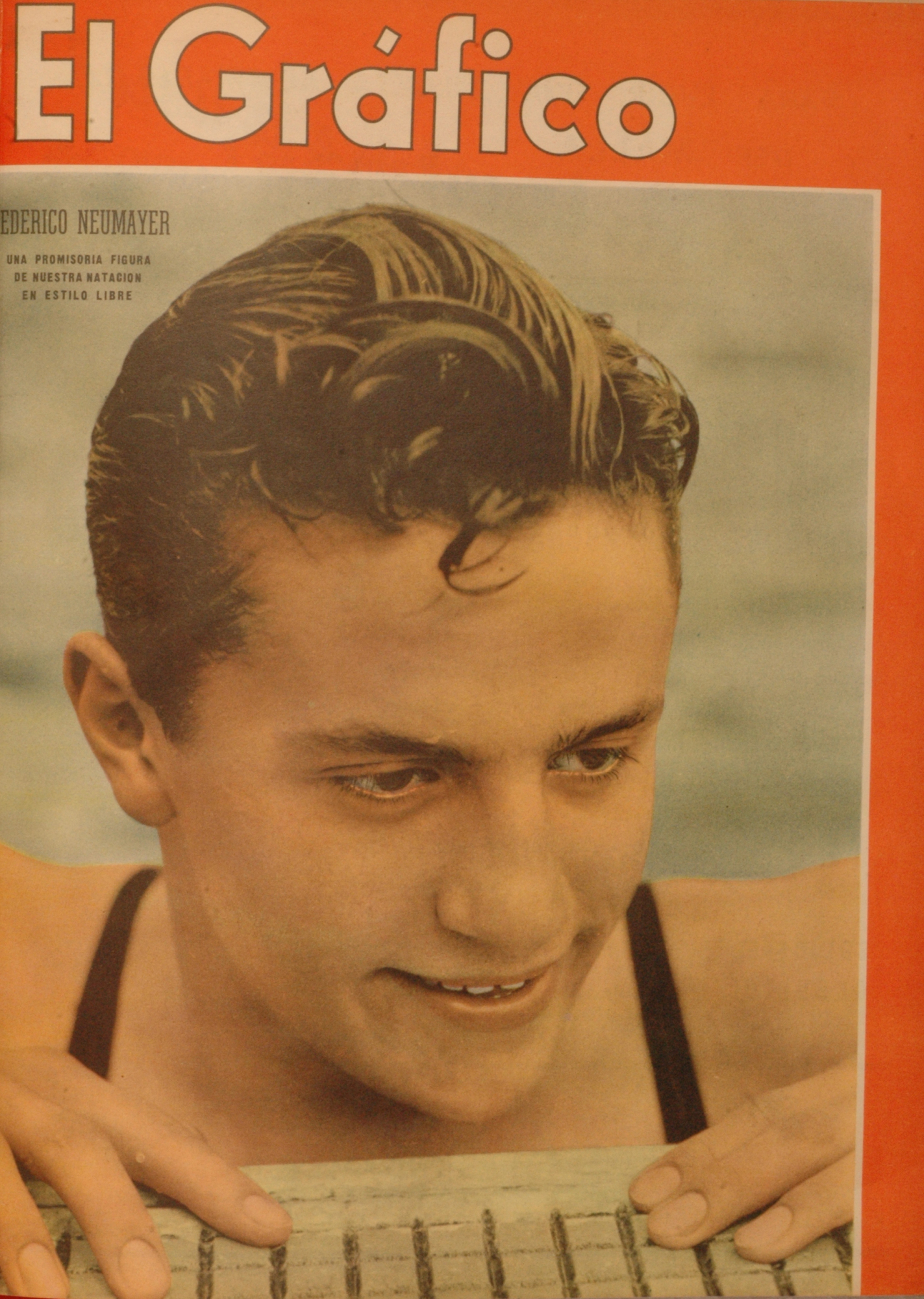
- Neumayer on the cover of El Gráfico in 1941

Personal information
- Nationality: Argentina
- Born: July 27, 1923 Rosario, Santa Fe, Argentina
- Died: March 31, 1977 (aged 53) Buenos Aires, Argentina

Sport
- Sport: Swimming
- Strokes: Backstroke

Federico Enrique Neumayer (27 July 1923 – 31 March 1977) was an Argentine swimmer who competed at the 1948 Summer Olympics in the 100 m backstroke.
