= Kees Kievit =

Dutch swimmer (1931–2020)

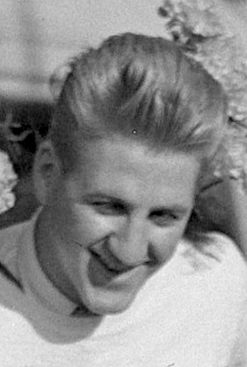
- Kievit with the 1950 Dutch swimming team

Personal information
- Born: 5 June 1931 Best, the Netherlands
- Died: 29 July 2020 (aged 89)

Sport
- Sport: swimming
- Club: PSV, Eindhoven
Medal record
Representing the Netherlands
European Championships
Silver medal – second place	1950 Vienna	100 m backstroke

Cornelis Marinus "Kees" Kievit (5 June 1931 – 29 July 2020) was a Dutch swimmer who won a silver medal in the 100 m backstroke event at the 1950 European Aquatics Championships. He also participated in the 1948 Summer Olympics but did not reach the finals. Between 1948 and 1951 he was 4 times national champion and set 12 national records in the 100 m and 200 m backstroke events.
