= Salvatore Scianamea =

Brazilian fencer

Personal information
- Born: 31 May 1919
- Died: 4 August 2002 (aged 83)

Sport
- Sport: Fencing

Salvatore Scianamea (31 May 1919 – 4 August 2002) was a Brazilian fencer. He competed in the individual foil and team épée events at the 1948 Summer Olympics.
