= Karen Harup =

Danish swimmer (1924–2009)

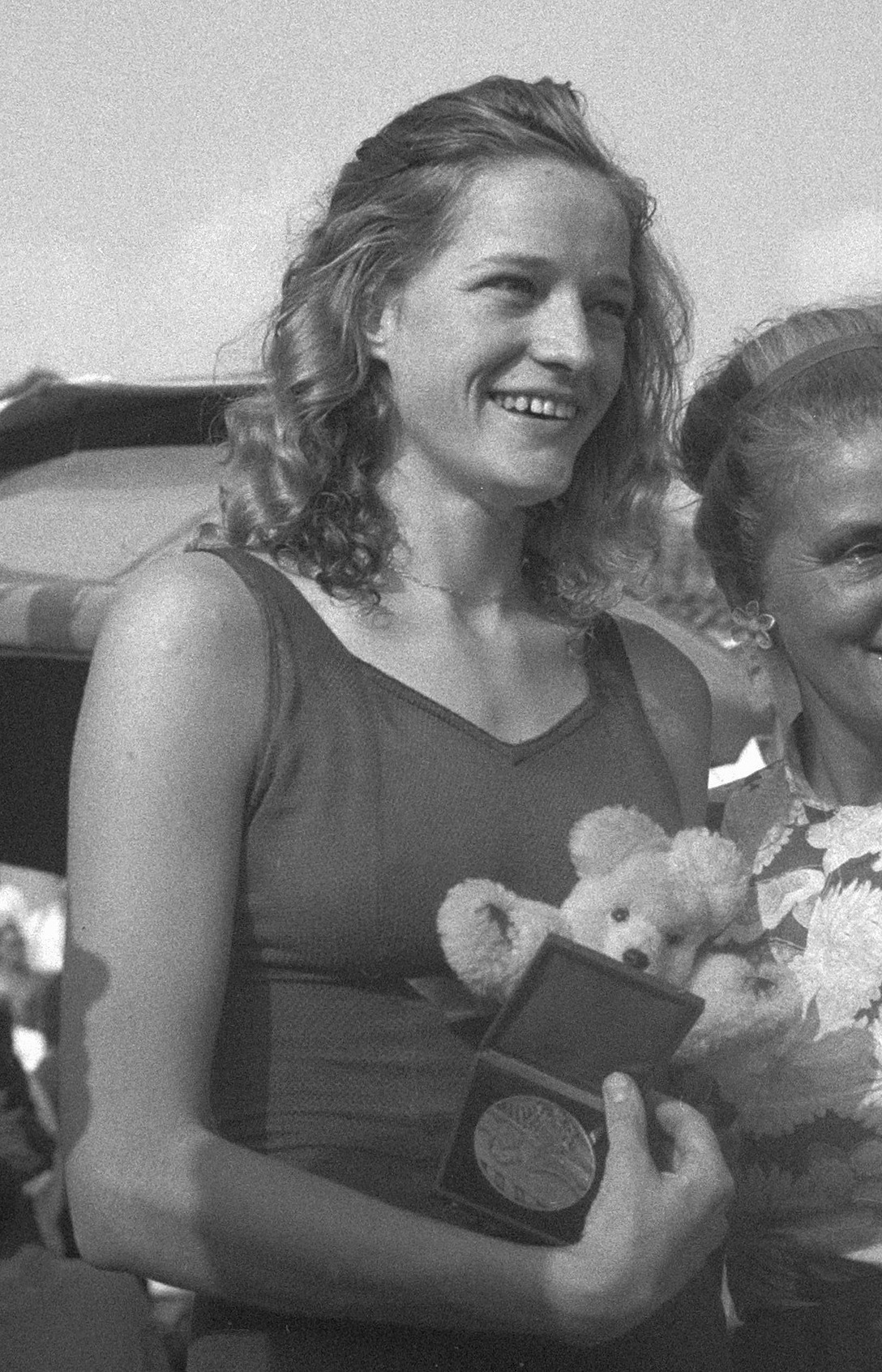
- Karen Harup in 1947

Personal information
- Born: 20 November 1924 Skovshoved, Denmark
- Died: 9 July 2009 (aged 84) Copenhagen, Denmark

Sport
- Sport: Swimming
- Club: DKG, København
Medal record
Representing Denmark
Olympic Games
Gold medal – first place	1948 London	100 m backstroke
Silver medal – second place	1948 London	400 m freestyle
Silver medal – second place	1948 London	4×100 m freestyle
European Championships
Gold medal – first place	1947 Monte Carlo	400 m freestyle
Gold medal – first place	1947 Monte Carlo	100 m backstroke
Gold medal – first place	1947 Monte Carlo	4×100 m freestyle

Karen Margrethe Harup Petersen (20 November 1924 – 9 July 2009) was a Danish swimmer. She competed in four events at the 1948 Summer Olympics and won three medals: a gold in the 100 m backstroke and silvers in the 400 m and 4 × 100 m freestyle, placing fourth in the 100 m freestyle.

She won three more gold medals at the 1947 European Championships. During her career she held 30 national titles and set two world records in freestyle relay events. In 1949, she retired from competitions and started a five decades long career of a swimming coach. In 1975, she was inducted into the International Swimming Hall of Fame.

== See also ==
- List of members of the International Swimming Hall of Fame
