= Gyula Válent =

Hungarian swimmer

Personal information
- Born: 27 September 1926 Eger, Hungary
- Died: 10 September 2010 (aged 83) Tatabánya, Hungary

Sport
- Sport: Swimming
- Club: Egri Szakszerveseti Tanács
Medal record
Representing Hungary
European Championships
Silver medal – second place	1947 Monte Carlo	100 m backstroke

Gyula Válent (27 September 1926 – 10 September 2010) was a Hungarian swimmer who won a silver medal in the 100 m backstroke at the 1947 European Aquatics Championships. He competed in the same event at the 1948 Summer Olympics, but did not reach the finals.
