= Margot Marsman =

Dutch swimmer (1932–2018)

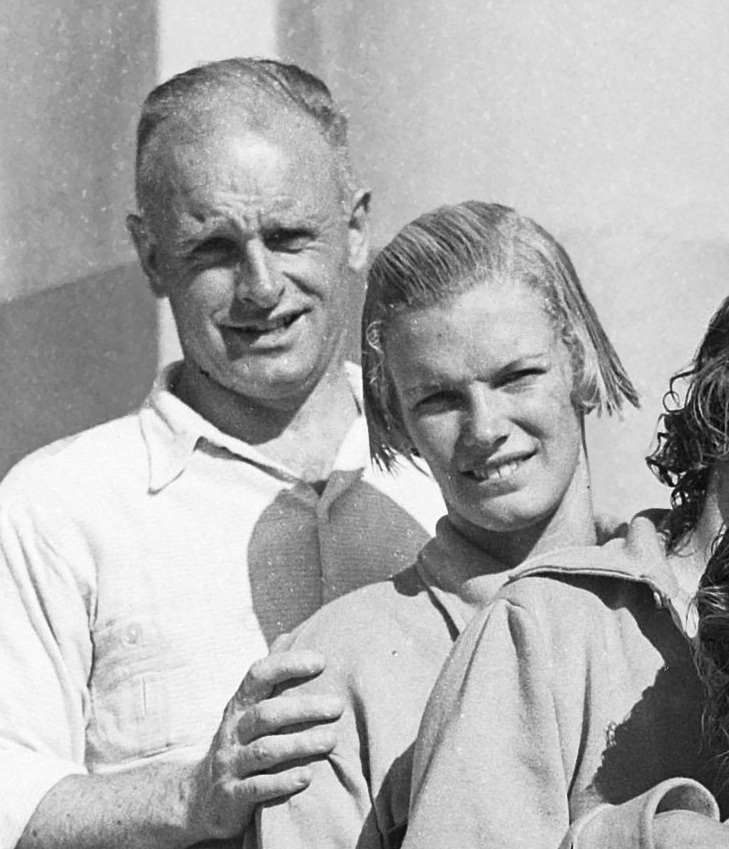
- Margot Marsman with coach Jan Stender at the 1947 European Championships

Personal information
- Born: 9 February 1932 Haarlem, the Netherlands
- Died: 5 September 2018 (aged 86) Haarlem, the Netherlands

Sport
- Sport: Swimming
- Strokes: Freestyle
- Club: HVGB, Haarlem
Medal record
Representing the Netherlands
Olympic Games
Bronze medal – third place	1948 London	4×100 m freestyle
European Championships
Silver medal – second place	1947 Monte Carlo	4×100 m freestyle

Margot Marsman (9 February 1932 – 5 September 2018) was a Dutch freestyle swimmer. She was part of the 4 × 100 m relay team that won a silver medal at the 1947 EuropeanChampionships and a bronze at the 1948 Summer Olympics.
