= Roger Heinkelé =

French diver

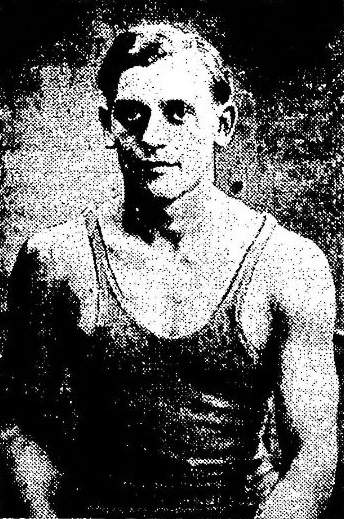
- Roger Heinkelé in 1935

Personal information
- Nationality: French
- Born: 6 January 1913
- Died: 24 April 2001 (aged 88)

Sport
- Sport: Diving
Medal record
Men's diving
Representing France
European Championships
Gold medal – first place	1947 Monte Carlo	3 m springboard

Roger Heinkelé (6 January 1913 – 24 April 2001) was a French diver. He competed at the 1936 Summer Olympics and the 1948 Summer Olympics.
