= Eddie Heron =

Irish diver (1910–1985)

Personal information
- Born: November 28, 1910; Dublin, Ireland
- Died: April 23, 1985 (aged 74); Dublin, Ireland

Sport
- Sport: Diving

Plaque celebrating Eddie Heron's life and swimming achievements outside Blackrock train station in County Dublin, Ireland

James Edward Heron (28 November 1910 – 23 April 1985) was an Irish high diving and springboard diving champion. He won the British Diving Championship in 1932 and represented Ireland at the 1948 Olympic Games.

== Early life ==
Eddie Heron was born in the north inner city of Dublin, Ireland. His father, Michael, worked as a butcher and was from Carlow. His mother, Mary Heron (née Kennedy) was from Dublin. Heron senior was an able gymnast and diver and introduced his son to both disciplines at an early age. Indeed, young Heron learnt to dive before he could swim. At the age of eleven his father had to help him from the pool following a swallow dive which the boy performed at the Kingstown (now Dún Laoghaire) Regatta.

== National victories ==
Heron's first major successes took place in 1924 when he was thirteen. In July he won the Leinster Championship. A month later he competed in the Tailteann Games, coming third in the Men's Plain Diving competition. The winner was Olympic champion, Dick Eve. At the same games Heron won the boys' diving competition. Between then and 1950, he dominated Irish diving, winning thirty-four national titles in both high diving and springboard events.

== International achievements ==
In 1932 Heron achieved international success by beating Doug Tomalin to win the British Diving Championship at Leeds. In preparation for the 1936 Summer Olympics, Heron spent the first six months of the year in Miami, Florida, where he trained with Pete Desjardins, the 1928 Olympic champion. However, due to a dispute as to which sporting body should represent Irish athletes, Ireland did not participate in the 1936 Olympics. The next games took place in London in 1948 but another dispute over jurisdiction led to Heron and his team mates withdrawing from all swimming and diving events. Heron did, however, compete in the opening heats of the diving competitions before the withdrawal.

== Later years ==
Although Heron retired from competitive diving in 1950, he was persuaded to take part in the 1968 Irish three-metre springboard championship held at Blackrock Baths in Dublin. At the age of fifty-seven, he took the title by defeating the reigning champion, George Matulevicze. He continued to take part in diving exhibitions and competitions well into his sixties. At the annual Texaco Sports Star Awards held in January 1977, Heron received the Hall of Fame award from Taoiseach Liam Cosgrave.

The Dublin City Library Archive, Sports Archive, Pearse Street, Dublin 2, have a DVD recording of the 1982 RTE television sports program "Times Past" where Heron talks about his diving career with RTE Presenter and Olympian Brendan O'Reilly.

== Personal life ==
Heron was married to Helen (‘Nellie’) McGuirk; they had no children. Following a long illness, he died in St. Vincent's Hospital, Dublin, at the age of seventy-four.

Eddie and Nellie Heron are buried in Shanganagh Cemetery, Co Dublin - the grave location is F-16 St Ciaran .

== Posthumous honours ==
In July each year, swimmers compete for the Eddie Heron Cup in a race from Dún Laoghaire to Blackrock. This is organised by Heron's former club, Sandycove Swimming Club. A plaque in honour of Eddie Heron has been erected near the now-demolished Blackrock Baths where he competed for many years.
