= Catherine Gibson =

Scottish swimmer (1931–2013)

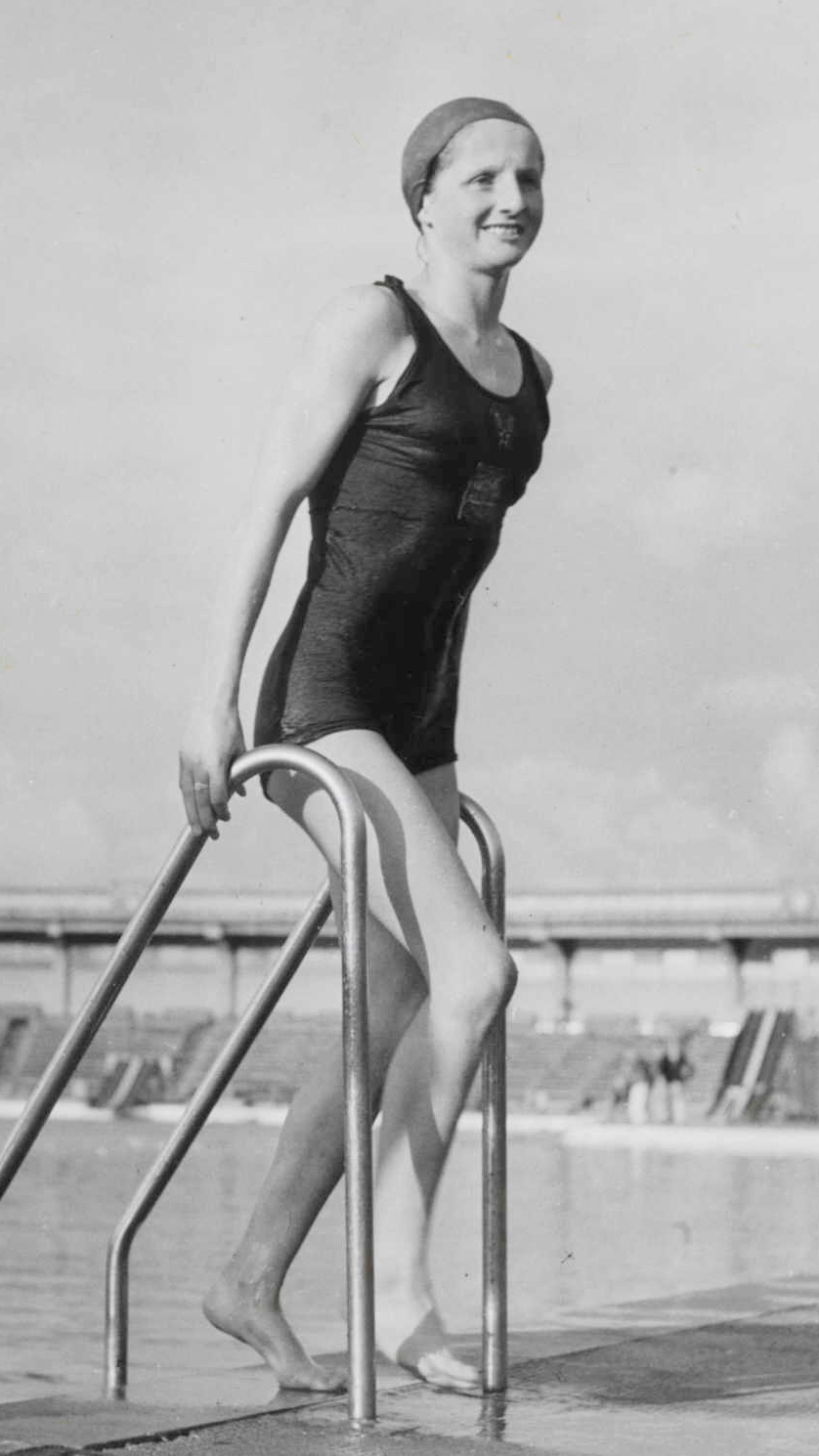
- Gibson in 1946

Personal information
- Full name: Catherine Gibson Brown
- Nickname: "Cathie"
- National team: Great Britain
- Born: 21 March 1931 Motherwell, Scotland
- Died: 25 June 2013 (aged 82) Kirkcaldy

Sport
- Sport: Swimming
- Strokes: Freestyle, backstroke
Medal record
Representing United Kingdom
Olympic Games
Bronze medal – third place	1948 London	400 m freestyle
European Championships (LC)
Silver medal – second place	1947 Monte Carlo	100 m backstroke
Silver medal – second place	1947 Monte Carlo	400 m freestyle
Bronze medal – third place	1947 Monte Carlo	4×100 m freestyle

Catherine Gibson (21 March 1931 – 25 June 2013), later known by her married name Catherine Brown, was a Scottish swimmer. During a 16-year career she won three European Championships medals and a bronze medal at the 1948 Summer Olympics, Britain's sole swimming trophy in the home-based Games. In 2008, she was inducted into the Scottish Sports Hall of Fame.

== Early life ==
Catherine "Cathie" Gibson was from Motherwell, the daughter of James and Mary Gibson. Her father was employed at the town swimming pool, and her two brothers played water polo, so young Cathie learned to swim too: "I always had a love of the water," she recalled in 2008. She won a prize in a girls' competition in 1942.

== Athletic career ==
In 1947, at the age of 16, Gibson was a member of the British swimming team at the European Championships. Gibson won silver medals in the 400m freestyle and the 100m backstroke and a bronze in the 100m freestyle relay. With the Olympics a year away, she continued an 8-hour daily training regimen, despite the family's low finances, which required her to work full-time as a clerk. She won the 1947 and 1948 ASA National Championship 220 yards freestyle titles and the 1947 and 1948 ASA National Championship 440 yards freestyle titles.

At the start of the Olympics, four months past her seventeenth birthday, Gibson made her first journey to London, without her family because they could not afford the cost of the trip. She competed in the 100m backstroke, 400m individual medley, 4×100m freestyle relay and the 400m freestyle in which she won the bronze medal in a time of 5 minutes 22.5 seconds. Reporting from the Olympics on 9 July 1948, a Guardian reporter wrote that "Miss Gibson, Britain's hope, was at or near the rear and she did not begin to come up until 300 metres had been swum. Then how she went!"

Having lost by a tiny measure, Gibson noted, in passing, during an interview conducted in July 2008, near the medal win's 60th anniversary, her persistent feeling that had her father been able to cheer her on at the Wembley Empire Pool, she might have done better. It was Britain's sole medal in swimming at the 1948 Summer Olympics and she was the only British woman to win a bronze. Her success was honoured with a wax figure at Madame Tussauds.

Gibson persevered with competitive swimming through the 1950s and, in the sixteen years of pursuing the sport, managed to achieve 29 UK records.

== After the Olympics ==
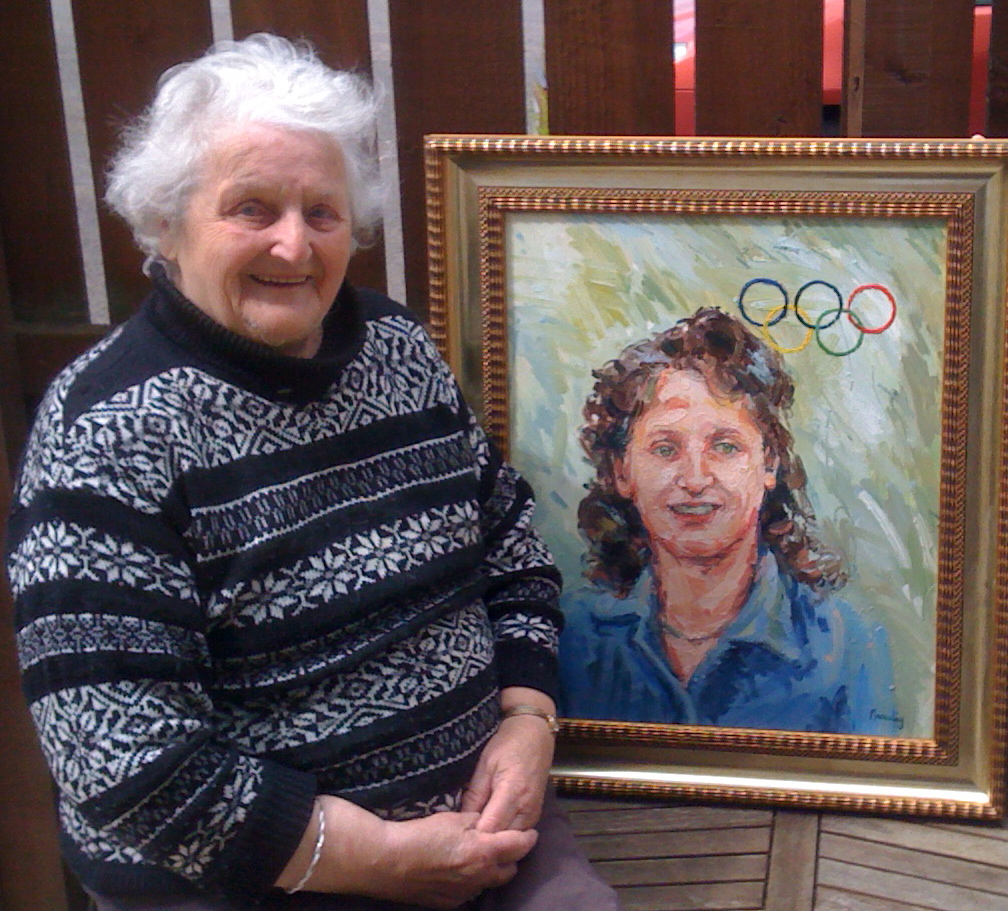
Catherine Brown alongside portrait by Kristina Macaulay

In 2008, Catherine Gibson Brown was inducted into the Scottish Sports Hall of Fame. With publicity surrounding London's 2012 Summer Olympics, Brown, along with the small number of athletes in their eighties and nineties remaining from the event held 64 years earlier, continued to evoke nostalgic tributes. She gave advice to the 2012 athletes: "You must love doing it, train very hard."

During the London 2012 Olympic Games, Brown was united with the original portrait of herself. The portrait was painted by artist Kristina Macaulay and was originally commissioned by North Lanarkshire City Council in 2006 to commemorate unique talent local to the area. The image of the painting featured as part of one of the largest local open air galleries in the UK.

== Personal life ==
Retiring from competition after marriage, Catherine Gibson became a hotelkeeper, and remained widowed after the death of her second husband in 1995. Catherine Gibson Brown died in 2013, aged 82 years, at Victoria Hospital in Kirkcaldy.

== See also ==
- Great Britain at the 1948 Summer Olympics
- List of Olympic medalists in swimming (women)
