= Maria da Costa =

Brazilian swimmer

Personal information
- Full name: Maria Angélica Leão da Costa
- Nationality: Brazil
- Born: March 12, 1931 São Paulo, Brazil
- Died: June 4, 2002 (aged 71) São Paulo, Brazil

Sport
- Sport: Swimming
- Strokes: Freestyle
Medal record
Women's swimming
Representing Brazil

Maria Angélica Leão da Costa (March 12, 1931 – June 4, 2002) was a former Olympic freestyle swimmer from Brazil, who competed at one Summer Olympics for her native country.

At 17 years old, she was at the 1948 Summer Olympics, in London, where she finished 6th in the 4×100-metre freestyle, along with Talita Rodrigues, Eleonora Schmitt and Piedade Coutinho. She also swam the 100-metre freestyle, not reaching the finals.
