= Vivian King =

Canadian swimmer (1930–2025)

Personal information
- Born: 4 April 1930 Winnipeg, Manitoba, Canada
- Died: 12 October 2025 (aged 95) Selkirk, Manitoba, Canada

Sport
- Sport: Swimming

Vivian Harriet King (4 April 1930 – 12 October 2025) was a Canadian freestyle swimmer. She competed in two events at the 1948 Summer Olympics. In 1984, King was inducted into the Manitoba Sports Hall of Fame. She died on 12 October 2025, at the age of 95.
