= Patricia Nielsen =

British swimmer

Personal information
- Born: 22 June 1930 Bromley, England
- Died: 1985 (aged 54–55) Swindon, England

Sport
- Sport: Swimming

Patricia Nielsen (22 June 1930 – 1985) was a British swimmer. She competed in three events at the 1948 Summer Olympics.
