= Eleonora Schmitt =

Brazilian swimmer (born 1931)

Eleonora Schmidt
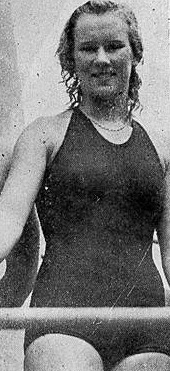
- Sport Ilustrado, 1948

Personal information
- Full name: Eleonora Margarida Josephina Schmitt
- Nationality: Brazil
- Born: August 23, 1931 (age 94) Brazil

Sport
- Sport: Swimming
- Strokes: Freestyle
Medal record
Women's swimming
Representing Brazil

Eleonora Margarida J. Schmitt (born August 23, 1931) is a former Olympic freestyle swimmer from Brazil, who competed at one edition of the Summer Olympics for her native country. At 16 years old, she was at the 1948 Summer Olympics, in London, where she finished 6th in the 4×100-metre freestyle, along with Talita Rodrigues, Maria da Costa and Piedade Coutinho. She also swam the 100-metre freestyle, not reaching the finals.
