= Gertrudes Morg =

Brazilian sprinter

Personal information
- Born: 10 April 1925 Nova Friburgo, Brazil
- Died: 8 March 2016 (aged 90) Nazário, Brazil

Sport
- Sport: Sprinting
- Event: 4 × 100 metres relay

Gertrudes Ida Morg (10 April 1925 – 8 March 2016) was a Brazilian sprinter. She competed in the women's 4 × 100 metres relay at the 1948 Summer Olympics.
