= Talita Rodrigues =

Brazilian swimmer (1934–2019)

Personal information
- Full name: Talita de Alencar Rodrigues
- Nationality: Brazil
- Born: 23 August 1934 Rio de Janeiro, Brazil
- Died: 22 July 2019 (aged 84) Araguaína, Brazil

Sport
- Sport: Swimming
- Strokes: Freestyle
Medal record
Women's swimming
Representing Brazil
Pan American Games
| Bronze medal – third place | 1951 Buenos Aires | 4x100 m freestyle |

Talita de Alencar Rodrigues (23 August 1934 – 22 July 2019) was a Brazilian Olympic freestyle swimmer, who competed at one Summer Olympics for her native country.

== Biography ==
Rodrigues was born in Rio de Janeiro on 23 August 1934. At 13 years old, she was at the 1948 Summer Olympics, in London, where she finished 6th in the 4×100-metre freestyle, along with Eleonora Schmitt, Maria da Costa and Piedade Coutinho. Even today, she is the youngest member of a Brazilian swimming delegation in Olympic history.

At the inaugural Pan American Games in 1951, in Buenos Aires, Argentina, she claimed a bronze medal in the 4×100-metre freestyle. She also finished 5th in the 200-metre freestyle.

Rodrigues died in Araguaína, Brazil on 22 July 2019, at the age of 84.
