= Gunnar Kemnitz =

Brazilian diver

Personal information
- Born: 16 December 1927; São Paulo, Brazil
- Died: 27 December 2009 (aged 82); Phoenix, Arizona, U.S.

Sport
- Sport: Diving

Gunnar Kemnitz (16 December 1927 – 27 December 2009) was a Brazilian diver. He competed in the men's 3 metre springboard event at the 1948 Summer Olympics.
