= Pedro Simão =

Brazilian sports shooter

Personal information
- Born: 16 August 1915 São Paulo, Brazil
- Died: 23 August 2001 (aged 86) São Paulo, Brazil

Sport
- Sport: Sports shooting

Pedro Simão (16 August 1915 ― 23 August 2001) was a Brazilian sports shooter. He competed at the 1948 Summer Olympics, 1952 Summer Olympics and 1956 Summer Olympics.
