= Bob Cowell (swimmer) =

American swimmer (1924–1960)

- Cowell, circa 1948

Personal information
- Full name: Robert Elmer Cowell
- Nickname: "Bob"
- National team: United States
- Born: June 12, 1924 Uniontown, Pennsylvania, U.S.
- Died: January 11, 1960 (aged 35) Athens, Georgia, U.S.
- Height: 6 ft 4 in (1.93 m)
- Weight: 195 lb (88 kg)
- Spouse: Eloise
- Children: 2

Sport
- Sport: Swimming
- Strokes: Backstroke
- College team: U.S. Naval Academy
Medal record
Men's swimming
Representing the United States
Olympic Games
Silver medal – second place	1948 London	100 m backstroke
Representing Navy
NCAA
Gold medal – first place	1946 New Haven	150-yard backstroke

Robert Elmer Cowell (June 12, 1924 – January 11, 1960) was an American competition swimmer, who competed for the U.S. Naval Academy, a 1948 Olympic silver medalist in the 100-meter backstroke, a 1948 world record holder in the 100-yard backstroke, and a U.S. Navy officer. Cowell served as a U.S. Navy flyer in the Korean conflict.

Cowell attended the U.S. Naval Academy in Annapolis, Maryland, where he was a member of the Navy Midshipmen swimming and diving team in National Collegiate Athletic Association (NCAA) competition from 1944 to 1946. Traditionally, the team competed against the Ivy League and other schools, though in the 1945-1946 school years, the Navy swim team competed against the highly rated Ivy League teams at Cornell, Princeton, Penn, and Columbia, but not Harvard or Yale, as they often did. He was a member of Navy's NCAA championship team in the 3x100-yard medley relay in 1944, and won the individual NCAA national championship in the 150-yard backstroke in 1946. With the help of Cowell, and other top swimmers, in the 1945-1946 swim season, the USNA swim team performed above expectations and went undefeated with a 9-0 Conference record and an 11–0 overall record. They tied for fourth at the National NCAA championships that season. He was also the Amateur Athletic Union (AAU) national champion in the 100-meter outdoor backstroke in 1945 and the 150-yard indoor backstroke in 1947. In August, 1945, he won the Men's 100-meter backstroke at the National Championship in Ohio with a time of 1:10.6.

== 100-yard backstroke world record ==
At the York YMCA Open Invitation Swimming Meet on June 12, 1948, Cowell set a world record in the 100-yard long-course backstroke on his 24th birthday with an official time of 1:00.4 at the Naval Academy pool in Annapolis, breaking the former record of 1:02. The race was supervised by Arthur Price, President of the South Atlantic AAU, and included three official timekeepers. As the 100-yard backstroke was not an Olympic event, Cowell's record may have gone somewhat less noticed. Cowell swam a two-person race against Naval Ensign Bob Tribble, who swam a close 1:01.8 for the distance, also breaking the formal record.

== 1948 London Olympic silver medal ==
At the 1948 Summer Olympics in London, England, in August, he received a silver medal for his second-place performance in the men's 100-meter backstroke, finishing with a time of 1:06.5, only one tenth of a second behind fellow American Allen Stack. Although Stack was the favorite to win the event, the final heat was much closer than expected as Cowell was on his heels throughout and even led the race at one point.

After graduating from the Naval Academy, he became a career U.S. Navy officer, initially with the rank of Ensign. During the Korean conflict in the 1950s, Cowell was decorated as a Navy flyer. In 1960, at the age of only 35, he died prematurely while driving through a curve on U.S. 29, seven miles north of Athens, Georgia as a result of a head-on car crash while driving from Jacksonville, Florida to Washington. Cowell held the rank of Lieutenant Commander at the time of the accident. His wife Eloise, and the other driver were killed and Cowell's two children were seriously injured.

=== Honors ===
Cowell was made the U.S. National Swimmer of the year in 1947.

In Cowell's memory, the Naval Academy annually presents the Robert E. Cowell Award to the graduating midshipman who has shown outstanding swimming ability, leadership and good sportsmanship.

== See also ==
- List of Olympic medalists in swimming (men)
- List of United States Naval Academy alumni
