= Francisco Calamita =

Spanish swimmer

Personal information
- Born: 9 November 1922 Santa Cruz de Tenerife, Spain
- Died: 9 February 2007 (aged 84)

Sport
- Sport: Swimming

Francisco Calamita (9 November 1922 – 9 February 2007) was a Spanish swimmer. He competed in the men's 100 metre backstroke at the 1948 Summer Olympics.
