= Swimming at the 1948 Summer Olympics =

Coordinates: 51.5581°N 0.2830°W

Swimming at the Games of the XIV Olympiad
- Venue: Wembley Arena
- Dates: 30 July – 7 August 1948
- No. of events: 11
- Competitors: 249 from 34 nations

At the 1948 Summer Olympics in London, 11 swimming events were contested, six for men and five for women. All swimming events took place at the Empire Pool. There was a total of 249 participants from 34 countries competing.

== Medal table ==
Rank	Nation	Gold	Silver	Bronze	Total
1	United States	8	6	1	15
2	Denmark	2	2	0	4
3	Netherlands	1	0	2	3
4	Australia	0	2	2	4
5	Hungary	0	1	3	4
6	France	0	0	2	2
7	Great Britain	0	0	1	1
Totals (7 entries)		11	11	11	33

== Medal summary ==
=== Men's events ===
Games	Gold		Silver		Bronze	
100 m freestyle	Wally Ris; United States	57.3 (OR)	Alan Ford; United States	57.8	Géza Kádas; Hungary	58.1
400 m freestyle	Bill Smith; United States	4:41.0 (OR)	Jimmy McLane; United States	4:43.4	John Marshall; Australia	4:47.7
1500 m freestyle	Jimmy McLane; United States	19:18.5	John Marshall; Australia	19:31.3	György Mitró; Hungary	19:43.2
100 m backstroke	Allen Stack; United States	1:06.4	Bob Cowell; United States	1:06.5	Georges Vallerey; France	1:07.8
200 m breaststroke	Joe Verdeur; United States	2:39.3 (OR)	Keith Carter; United States	2:40.2	Bob Sohl; United States	2:43.9
4 × 200 metre freestyle relay	United States; Wally Ris; Jimmy McLane; Wally Wolf; Bill Smith	8:46.0 (WR)	Hungary; Elemér Szatmári; György Mitró; Imre Nyéki; Géza Kádas	8:48.4	France; Joseph Bernardo; René Cornu; Henri Padou, Jr. Alexandre Jany	9:08.0

=== Women's events ===
Games	Gold		Silver		Bronze	
100 m freestyle	Greta Andersen; Denmark	1:06.3	Ann Curtis; United States	1:06.5	Marie-Louise Linssen-Vaessen; Netherlands	1:07.6
400 m freestyle	Ann Curtis; United States	5:17.8 (OR)	Karen Harup; Denmark	5:21.2	Catherine Gibson; Great Britain	5:22.5
100 m backstroke	Karen Harup; Denmark	1:14.4 (OR)	Suzanne Zimmerman; United States	1:16.0	Judy-Joy Davies; Australia	1:16.7
200 m breaststroke	Nel van Vliet; Netherlands	2:57.2	Nancy Lyons; Australia	2:57.7	Éva Novák; Hungary	3:00.2
4 × 100 metre freestyle relay	United States; Marie Corridon; Thelma Kalama; Brenda Helser; Ann Curtis	4:29.2 (OR)	Denmark; Eva Arndt; Karen Harup; Greta Andersen; Fritze Carstensen	4:29.6	Netherlands; Irma Heijting-Schuhmacher; Margot Marsman; Marie-Louise Linssen-Vaessen; Hannie Termeulen	4:31.6

== Participating nations ==
249 swimmers from 34 nations competed.

- Argentina (17)
- Australia (10)
- Austria (2)
- Belgium (6)
- Bermuda (5)
- Brazil (13)
- Canada (9)
- China (1)
- Colombia (2)

- Cuba (2)
- Czechoslovakia (3)
- Denmark (6)
- Egypt (6)
- Finland (1)
- France (17)
- Great Britain (25)
- Greece (2)

- Hungary (15)
- Iceland (8)
- India (7)
- Mexico (9)
- Netherlands (12)
- New Zealand (1)
- Norway (1)
- Pakistan (4)

- Philippines (3)
- Portugal (1)
- South Africa (3)
- Spain (6)
- Sweden (8)
- Switzerland (8)
- United States (28)
- Uruguay (2)
- Yugoslavia (6)
