= Victório Ferraz =

Brazilian sailor (1924–2006)

Victório dos Reis Ferraz (27 January 1924 – 3 June 2006) was a Brazilian sailor who competed in the 1948 Summer Olympics. Ferraz died in Campinas on 3 June 2006, at the age of 82.
