= Hélio Silva (swimmer) =

Brazilian swimmer (1926–2006)

Personal information
- Full name: Hélio de Oliveira e Silva
- Nickname: Paluca
- Born: 28 May 1926 Rio de Janeiro, Brazil
- Died: 3 August 2006 (aged 80) Niterói, Brazil

Sport
- Sport: Swimming
- Strokes: Backstroke

Hélio de Oliveira e Silva (Note: This name uses Portuguese naming customs: the first or maternal family name is de Oliveira and the second or paternal family name is Silva.) (28 May 1926 – 3 August 2006), also known as Paluca, was a Brazilian Olympic backstroke swimmer, who participated at one Summer Olympics for his native country.

At the 1948 Summer Olympics in London, he swam the 100-metre backstroke, reaching the semifinals.

Silva died in Niterói on 3 August 2006, at the age of 80.
