= Brenda Helser =

American swimmer (1924–2001)

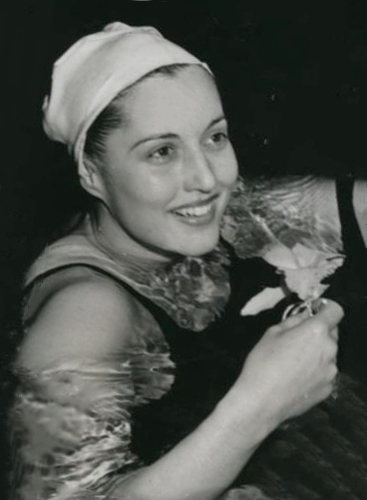
- Helser in 1948

Personal information
- Full name: Brenda Mersereau Helser
- National team: United States
- Born: May 26, 1924 San Francisco, California, U.S.
- Died: March 26, 2001 (aged 76)
- Spouse: Count Lorenzo de Morelos

Sport
- Sport: Swimming
- Strokes: Freestyle
- Club: Crystal Plunge Swim Club, S.F. Multnomah Athletic Club, Los Angeles Athletic Club
- College team: Stanford University; No women's swim team
- Coach: Charlie Sava (Crystal SC); Jack Cody (Multinomah SC)
Medal record
Representing the United States
Olympic Games
Gold medal – first place	1948 London	4×100 m freestyle relay

Brenda Mersereau Helser (May 26, 1924 – March 26, 2001), later known by her married name Brenda Helser de Morelos, was an American former competition swimmer who graduated Stanford University, and won a gold medal in the women's 4×100-meter freestyle relay at the 1948 Summer Olympics in London.

== Early life and swimming ==
Born in San Francisco on May 26, 1924 to Charles W. Helser Jr. and Brenda Beatrice Mersereau. In her early career in San Francisco, she received some training from Hall of Fame Coach Charlie Silva at the Crystal Plunge Swim Club. Helser attended High School in Oregon where she graduated from Portland's Lincoln High School. Along with fellow 1948 Olympians Suzanne Zimmerman and Nancy Merki, she was part of the Multnomah Athletic Club team dubbed "Cody's Kids" that from 1939 to 1948, won 58 individual national swimming titles and three national team swimming championships. At the Mulnomah Club Helser was coached by International Swimming Hall of Fame member Jack Cody.

By 1942, at 17, Helser held the American record in the 100 meter and 110 yard distances, and held American indoor records in the 220 yard and 200 meter distances. At 15, as a High School sophomore, she first took the National 220 yard freestyle championship, and by 17 took the junior national title in the 500-yard freestyle.

=== Stanford University ===
Helser attended Stanford University, where she graduated in 1946. She continued to swim with the Multinomah Athletic Club during her time at Stanford, and on August 24, 1945, tied the National AAU women's record in the 100-meter freestyle with a time of 1:08. While at Stanford, she set an unofficial new American record in the 100-yard freestyle of 60.3 seconds.

Shortly after graduating Stanford in 1946, she moved to Los Angeles and began swimming for the Los Angeles Athletic Club. Helser worked as a model during her swimming career and had a small role in the short movie "Aquaqueens" in 1946, likely after her move to Los Angeles. She spoke frequently of want a career as an actress working in theater.

== 1948 London Olympic gold ==
Helser's swam the 4x100 freestyle relay as the third swimmer in the 1948 London Olympics with Marie Corridon, Hawaiian native Thelma Kalama, and anchor Ann Curtis, a swimming rival in National competition, particularly in the 100-yard event. In an exciting Olympic finish, American Ann Curtis began to gain time and pass the swimmer from the Dutch team that was in second place. With only 15 meters left in her 100-meter swim, she edged ever closer to the second place Dutch swimmer. With a strong final sprint that excited the crowd, Curtis passed the first place Danish swimmer Fritze Carstensen breaking the old Olympic record, and setting a new record of 4:29.2. Curtis's time of 1:04.4, though unofficial, was the fastest time ever recorded for a 100-meter distance, though it could not become official as only the first leg in a relay can count as an official time. Despite the speed of her swim, the American team finished only .4 of a second ahead of the second-place Danish team, making for an epic finish.

Helser also swam in both individual women's freestyle events at the London Olympics. She was eliminated in the semi-finals of the 100-meter swim, and placed fifth in the final of the 400-meter event with a time of 5:26.0, with American rival Ann Curtis taking the gold with a time around nine seconds faster.

=== Marriage and family ===
Nearing her retirement from competitive swimming, Helser married Count Lorenzo de Morelos, a French noble with the title of the Comte de Morelos. and became the Comtesse de Morelos y Guerrero. The Comtesse de Morelos raised her children in France and Monte Carlo, eventually returning to the U.S.

Helser was made a member of the Oregon Sports Hall of Fame in 1981, and was also a member of the Stanford Athletic Hall of Fame.

She died on March 26, 2001.

== See also ==
- List of Olympic medalists in swimming (women)
- List of Stanford University people
