= Lucien Zins =

French swimmer

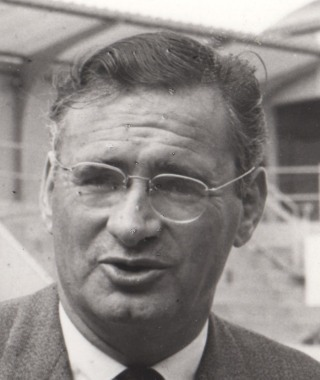
- Lucien Zins

Personal information
- Born: 14 September 1922 Troyes, France
- Died: 13 December 2002 (aged 80) Vittel, France

Sport
- Sport: Swimming

Lucien Zins (14 September 1922 – 13 December 2002) was a French swimmer. He competed at the 1948 Summer Olympics and the 1952 Summer Olympics.
