= Georges Vallerey Jr. =

French swimmer (1927–1954)

Personal information
- Born: October 21, 1927 Amiens, France
- Died: October 4, 1954 (aged 26)

Sport
- Sport: Swimming
Medal record
Representing France
Summer Olympics
Bronze medal – third place	1948 London	100 m backstroke
European Championships (LC)
Gold medal – first place	1947 Monte Carlo	100 m backstroke
Silver medal – second place	1947 Monte Carlo	4×200 m freestyle

Georges Vallerey Jr. (21 October 1927 – 4 October 1954) was a French swimmer, born in Amiens, who competed in the 1948 Summer Olympics.
