= Fernande Caroen =

Belgian swimmer (1920–1998)

Personal information
- Born: 27 July 1920 Ostend, Belgium
- Died: 16 April 1998 (aged 77) Ostend, Belgium

Sport
- Sport: Swimming
Medal record
Representing Belgium
European Championships
Bronze medal – third place	1938 London	400m freestyle
Bronze medal – third place	1947 Monte Carlo	400m freestyle

Fernande Caroen (27 July 1920 – 16 April 1998) was a Belgian freestyle swimmer. She participated in the 1948 Summer Olympics and finished fourth in the 400m freestyle event. She won two bronze medals in the same event at the 1938 and 1947 European Aquatics Championships.
