= Paulo Silva (swimmer) =

Brazilian swimmer (1923–2007)

Personal information
- Full name: Paulo Williemsens da Fonseca e Silva
- Nationality: Brazil
- Born: 2 December 1923 Rio de Janeiro, Brazil
- Died: 9 October 2007 (aged 84) Rio de Janeiro, Brazil

Sport
- Sport: Swimming
- Strokes: Backstroke
Medal record
Men's swimming
Representing Brazil

Paulo Williemsens da Fonseca e Silva (2 December 1923 – 9 October 2007) was a Brazilian Olympic backstroke swimmer, who participated at one Summer Olympics for his native country. At the 1948 Summer Olympics in London, he swam the 100-metre backstroke, reaching the semifinals.
