= Gisela Thidholm =

Swedish swimmer (1930–2009)

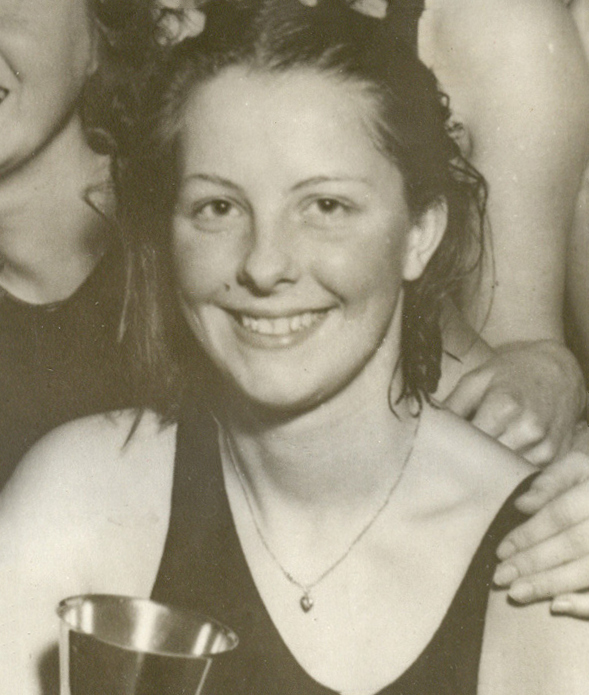

Personal information
- Full name: Gisela Eva Margareta Thidholm
- Born: 23 June 1930 Malmö, Sweden
- Died: 6 May 2009 (aged 78) Växjö, Sweden

Sport
- Sport: Swimming
- Strokes: Freestyle
- Club: Trelleborgs SS
Medal record
Representing Sweden
European Championships
Bronze medal – third place	1950 Vienna	4×100 m freestyle

Gisela Eva Margareta Thidholm (23 June 1930 – 6 May 2009) was a Swedish freestyle swimmer who won a bronze medal in the 4 × 100 m relay at the 1950 European Aquatics Championships. She competed at the 1948 Olympics in the 400 m and 4 × 100 m events, but failed to reach the finals.

Thidholm represented Trelleborgs SS.
