= Milton Busin =

Brazilian diver (1927–1994)

Personal information
- Born: 17 January 1927 São Paulo, Brazil
- Died: 16 June 1994 (aged 67)

Sport
- Sport: Diving

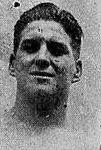
Busin in 1948

Milton Busin (17 January 1927 – 16 June 1994) was a Brazilian diver who competed at the 1948 Summer Olympics and the 1952 Summer Olympics for Brazil.
