= Piedade Coutinho =

Brazilian swimmer (1920–1997)

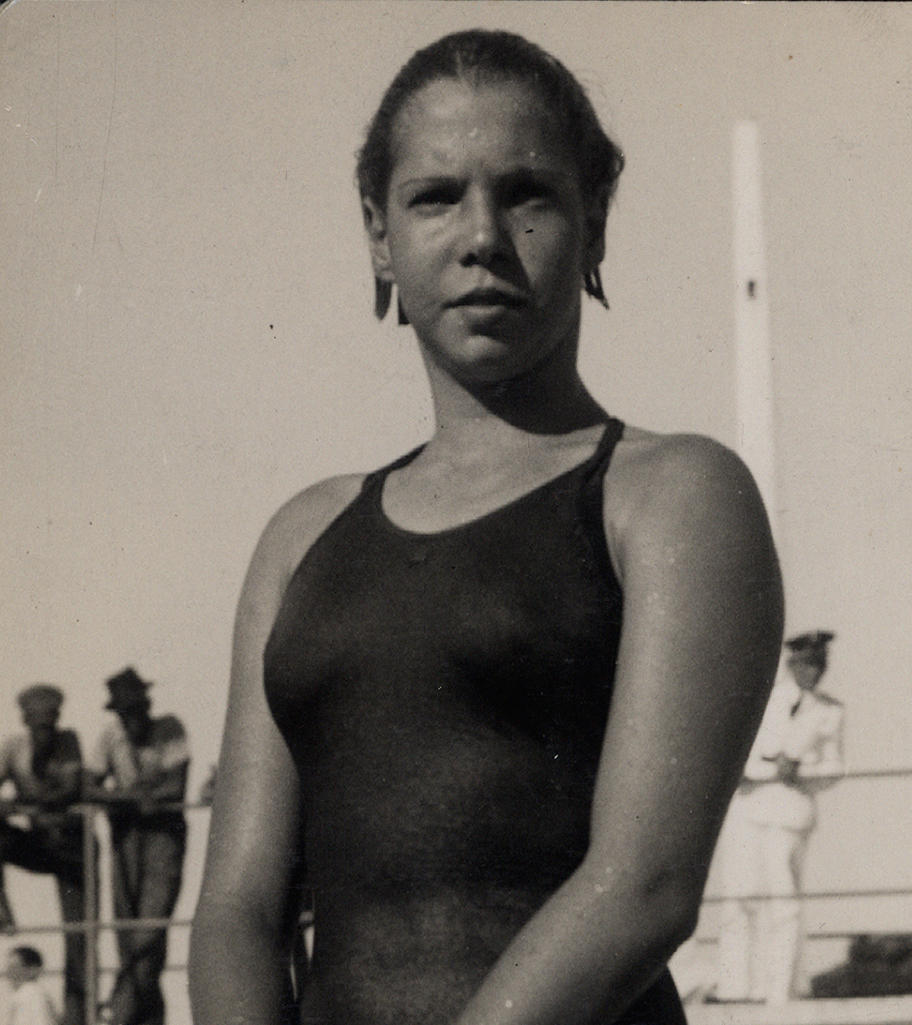

Personal information
- Full name: Piedade Coutinho Azevedo (Tavares) da Silva
- Nationality: Brazil
- Born: 2 May 1920 Rio de Janeiro, Rio de Janeiro, Brazil
- Died: 14 October 1997 (aged 77)

Sport
- Sport: Swimming
- Strokes: Freestyle
Medal record
Women's swimming
Representing Brazil
Pan American Games
Bronze medal – third place	1951 Buenos Aires	400 m freestyle
Bronze medal – third place	1951 Buenos Aires	4x100 m freestyle

Piedade Coutinho Azevedo (Tavares) da Silva (May 2, 1920 – October 14, 1997) was an Olympic freestyle swimmer from Brazil, who competed at three Summer Olympics for her native country. She was in three Olympic finals.

== Background ==
Born Piedade Coutinho Azevedo, she changed her name to Piedade Coutinho Tavares when she married.

The first mass participation of women was at a crossing in 1924 in São Paulo; eight swimmers from the German club Estela participated in it. The first exclusively women's competitions occurred in 1930 in São Paulo and Rio de Janeiro.

In 1935, the Brazilian Championship and the South American Championship, in which Coutinho participated and first appeared on the international scene, were held in Rio de Janeiro. Both were the first with women's events. Coutinho had started training in 1934 at a newly opened pool at the Clube de Regatas Guanabara. The level of competition was quite rudimentary, and being a 15-year-old novice, Coutinho did not get highlighted. The biggest Brazilian star was Maria Lenk, who competed in the Olympics in 1932 and was developing the breaststroke with recovery of arms out of the water, which would give rise to the butterfly stroke. Lenk was the first South American woman to compete at the Olympics. Coutinho's swimming improved in the space of a year; she broke the Brazilian record of 400-metre freestyle and was called to the 1936 Summer Olympics in Berlin.

== International career ==
At the 1936 Summer Olympics in Berlin, Coutinho finished 5th in the 400-metre freestyle—the best position of all time obtained by the Brazil women's swimming in Olympic Games, along with Joanna Maranhão. Coutinho also swam the 100-metre freestyle; she did not reach the final, but finished 8th. In 1937, Coutinho finished the year with the third best time in the world in the 400-metre freestyle, and in 1938, she had two South American records in freestyle. In 1940, Coutinho improved the South American record of the 1500-metre freestyle and surpassed the records of 500-metre, 800-metre and 1000-metre; times that were approved at the time in the proof passages. At the Brazilian Championship in 1941 in São Paulo, Coutinho won the 100-metre freestyle with a time of 1:08.5—a Brazilian record and one of the best times of the world at the time—in a race she was not specialized in. With this time, she would have been Olympic finalist in 1936 and in the next edition of the Games—which would occur in 1948.

In 1941, at the South American Championships organized in Viña Del Mar, she was responsible for 50.5 points of the 174 points scored by Brazil's women's team, which won the title by countries. Soon after, she left competitive swimming to get married and have a child. In an unprecedented decision, she returned to swimming in 1943. Coutinho continued winning Brazilian and South American titles and surpassing records. In 1948 she was chosen as Brazil's best athlete. At 28 years old, married and considered old for the sport, she was still breaking paradigms.

At the 1948 Summer Olympics, in London, Coutinho reached two finals, finishing 6th in the 400-metre freestyle and 6th in the 4×100-metre freestyle, along with Eleonora Schmitt, Maria da Costa and Talita Rodrigues. Coutinho also swam the 100-metre freestyle, not reaching the final. For her, however, the 400-metre freestyle final was not a cause for celebration. In that year, she had done an exceptional 5:20.3, sufficient for Olympic silver medal. But poor conditions of travel to Europe, room and board, and the loss of form for going several days without training because of the long journey had its price. This was typical of Brazilian sport in those days; similar conditions also cost Maria Lenk and Manuel dos Santos medals.

At the inaugural Pan American Games in 1951 in Buenos Aires, Coutinho won two bronze medals in the 400-metre freestyle, and in the 4×100-metre freestyle. She also finished 4th in the 200-metre freestyle. At 32 years old in the 1952 Summer Olympics in Helsinki, she swam in the 400-metre freestyle but did not reach the final.

== Records ==
Coutinho broke the Brazilian record of the 100, 200, 400, 800 and 1500-metre freestyle and made history in the Brazilian press by having her photo published in O Globo newspaper in 1936—the first telephoto photograph in the history of Brazilian press.

== After professional swimming ==
After leaving competitive swimming, Coutinho was director of swimming in the Botafogo club. She also began a process of recovery for disabled people. This interest emerged during the 1936 Olympics when she visited a Berlin hospital that through swimming, promoted the recovery of disabled children. In the late '50s, she campaigned for the construction of Home Recovery of Infantile Paralysis, where she developed water activities. She continued this work in Portugal, where she lived for eight years, and also in Brasilia.

In 1983, Coutinho returned to the Club de Regatas Guanabara, where she began teaching competitive swimming daily, teaching classes to friends and practicing painting; her hobby.

Piedade Coutinho died on October 14, 1997. Her fifth place in 1936 remained as the best women's Olympic placement of Brazil until 1964, when Aída dos Santos was fourth in the high jump. In the Pan American Games, a Brazilian woman won an individual medal in swimming in 1971, with Lucy Burle in the 100m butterfly. In the Olympics, Brazil had to wait 56 years for another woman to become a finalinst; Joanna Maranhão in the 400m medley in 2004. Coutinho had the most participation of Brazilian swimmers in the Olympics, participating in three games—tied with Maranhão and Fabiola Molina.
