= Sérgio Rodrigues (swimmer) =

Brazilian swimmer (1930–2014)

Personal information
- Full name: Sérgio Geraldo de Alencar Rodrigues
- Nationality: Brazil
- Born: 14 February 1930 Rio de Janeiro, Brazil
- Died: 17 August 2014 (aged 84) Rio de Janeiro, Brazil

Sport
- Sport: Swimming
- Strokes: Freestyle

Sérgio Geraldo de Alencar Rodrigues (14 February 1930 – 17 August 2014) was an international freestyle swimmer and water polo player from Brazil. At the 1948 Summer Olympics in London, he finished 8th in the 4×200-metre freestyle final, and swam the 100-metre freestyle, not reaching the finals. At the 1952 Summer Olympics in Helsinki, he participated in the water polo, finishing 13th.
