= Colette Thomas =

French swimmer

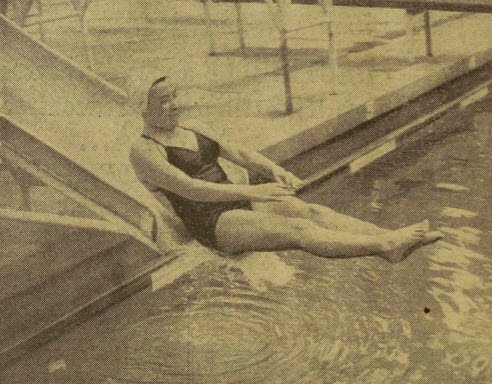

Personal information
- Born: 10 February 1929
- Died: 31 March 2001 (aged 72)

Sport
- Sport: Swimming
- Club: Mouettes Paris
Medal record
Representing France
European Championships
Bronze medal – third place	1950 Vienna	400 m freestyle

Colette Thomas (10 February 1929 – 31 March 2001) was a French swimmer who won a bronze medal in the 400 m freestyle at the 1950 European Aquatics Championships. She competed in four freestyle events at the 1948, 1952 and 1956 Summer Olympics with the best achievement of seventh place in the 4 × 100 m relay in 1948.
