= Ann Curtis =

American swimmer (1926–2012)

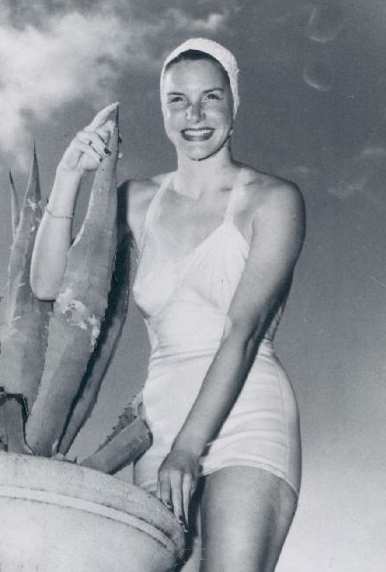
- Curtis at 22 after the National AAU meet in Daytona, posing in Boca Raton, FL., April, 1948

Personal information
- Full name: Ann Elisabeth Curtis
- National team: United States
- Born: March 6, 1926 San Francisco, California, U.S.
- Died: June 26, 2012 (aged 86) San Rafael, California, U.S.
- Height: 5 ft 11 in (1.80 m)
- Spouse: Gordon Cuneo (m. 1949)
- Children: 5

Sport
- Sport: Swimming
- Strokes: Freestyle
- Club: Crystal Plunge Swim Club
- Coach: Charlie Sava (Crystal Plunge)
Medal record
Representing United States
Olympic Games
Gold medal – first place	1948 London	400 m freestyle
Gold medal – first place	1948 London	4×100 m freestyle relay
Silver medal – second place	1948 London	100 m freestyle

Ann Elizabeth Curtis (March 6, 1926 – June 26, 2012), known after 1949 by her married name Ann Elisabeth Cuneo was an American competition swimmer and two-time Olympic champion at the 1948 London games. She would later have a career as a swim coach opening the Ann Curtis Swim Club and School of Swimming in Terra Linda, California.

== Early education and swimming ==
Ann Elisabeth Curtis was born in San Francisco, California, and trained in her early years by nuns. She began swimming at the age of 9, while she and her sister spent two years at the Ursuline Convent boarding school in Santa Rosa. She later attended and graduated San Francisco's Washington High School. Recognized by a coach at San Francisco's Jewish Community Center, Ann and her sister Sue trained there initially, and then at the larger and modern Fairmont Hotel Pool.

"1924 to be exact—the Crystal Plunge (originally named the Crystal Palace Salt Water Baths) was opened at 775 Lombard Street, between Mason and Taylor, by Italian immigrant Edward Cerruti, Jr. It was there that swim coach Charlie Sava (for whom the Larsen Park Pool at 19th Avenue and Wawona Street was re-named decades later) coached San Francisco native and George Washington High School grad Ann Curtis."

Anne developed more quickly under the direction of Hall of Fame Coach Charlie Sava as a member of San Francisco's Crystal Plunge Swimming Club that practiced at a wide 50-yard pool, the Terrace Plunge, now the Tonga Room at Fairmont San Francisco, a hotel in San Francisco's Nob Hill neighborhood. Sava, aware of her potential, managed Curtis for eight years, introducing modern training techniques. Taking her under his wing when she was 14, Silva had Curtis train in the pool five hours split into morning and afternoon sessions. Silva's pool training included numerous sets with repeat intervals and occasional resistance training, usually out of the pool. She later described Sava as an effective and innovative coach, but a demanding task manager. Already referred to as "The World's Greatest Woman Swimmer", in 1944, at age 18, she became the first woman, as well as the first swimmer, to receive the coveted James E. Sullivan Award, recognizing her as the outstanding American amateur athlete of the year.

Curtis attended the University of California at Berkeley from 1944-1948, a strong swimming power, that then had no women’s swim team. While at Berkeley in 1944 she set world freestyle records in 1944 at 800 meters and 880 yards. In 1947 she established freestyle world records at the 100 yard, 400 meter and 440 yard events. During her Berkeley years, she travelled each day by ferry to train with her Coach Charlie Sava at San Francisco Bay's Treasure Island, half way between Berkeley and San Francisco.

== 1948 Olympics ==
Considered that year's most successful woman swimmer, Curtis competed at the 1948 Summer Olympics in London, England, winning a medal in every freestyle swimming race in which women were allowed to enter at the time. She won her first gold medal in the women's 400-meter freestyle, setting an Olympic record on the way to winning by a margin of nearly four seconds. In her next race, she received the silver medal for her second-place finish in the women's 100-meter freestyle, a disappointing finish for her. She would later say she felt like she "had let down the world."

Her favorite moment of the Games came during the third event, when she won her second gold medal as a member of the women's 4×100-meter freestyle relay team. The United States was not favored to win, in part because she had placed second in the 100-meter individual event. When she took the water for the anchor leg in the relay, the United States team was in third place; she passed Johanna "Hannie" Termeulen of Holland and then Fritze Carstensen of Denmark to win the gold medal for the US by four-tenths of a second, setting another Olympic record in the process. When she returned to San Francisco, she was honored in a parade along Montgomery and Market Street.

During her career she set five world and 56 U.S. records, and earned 30 National Championship titles. By the time she swam at the 1948 London Games, Curtis was engaged to be married to Gordon Cuneo, a former basketball player for Cal; they were married in 1949, and she chose not to train for the 1952 Games, also in part because she had accepted a car from the City of San Francisco upon her return from London, which made her a professional swimmer. The couple would have five children.

== Post Olympic careers ==
Curtis swam professionally from 1948-1951 after retiring from competition. She began touring with the Nick Kahler Famous Sports and Boat Show where she demonstrated competitive strokes and raced with 1936 backstroke Olympic gold medalist Adolph Kiefer, who worked organizing talent for the show. She would please the crowd swimming with a seal, who always outswam her and Kiefer. She then toured with Sheehan's Aqua Follies, featuring music, and elaborate costumes, and would later make a commercial for Woodbury Soap. She ceased working after 1951, with the birth of her first child.

== Coaching ==
In 1959, after retiring from competition and starting her family, she opened the Ann Curtis Swim Club and School of Swimming in Tera Linda with her husband. The couple took out a loan, bought the land, and built the facility that featured a 75-foot competition pool and a smaller pool of 50 feet. Once under way, the Cuneo's bought additional land to build an adjacent home. In 1983, the club had ten teachers, 950 students, and its own swim club that had 100 families. A successful venture, the swim club mentored several future champions and operated over twenty years. One of her outstanding swimmers was 1972 Munich Olympian and future Coach Rick Demont who swam with Curtis in his early years.

She was inducted into the International Swimming Hall of Fame in 1966, and the Bay Area Sports Hall of Fame in 1983.

Curtis died at her home in San Rafael, California on June 26, 2012, aged 86.

Records set in 1943–1947
Date	Distance	Pool	Time	Location	Record
15 May 1943	220 yd (200 m)	short course	2:32.4	Crystal Plunge	National Junior
12 June 1943	100 yd (91 m)		1:02.5	Fleishhacker Pool	American
13 June 1943	220 yd (200 m)	long course	2:33.6	Fleishhacker Pool	American
30 July 1944	800 m (870 yd)		11:08.6	Fleishhacker Pool	World
8 August 1943	440 yd (400 m)	long course	5:25.0	Fleishhacker Pool	American
15 August 1944	440 yd (400 m)	short course	5:21.7	Athens Athletic Club	National Championship
2 May 1947	100 yd (91 m)	long course	0:59.4	UW University Pool	American (tied World)

== See also ==
- List of members of the International Swimming Hall of Fame
- List of Olympic medalists in swimming (women)
- List of University of California, Berkeley alumni
