= Allen Stack =

American swimmer and lawyer (1928–1999)

Personal information
- Full name: Allen McIntyre Stack
- National team: United States
- Born: January 23, 1928 New Haven, Connecticut, U.S.
- Died: September 12, 1999 (aged 71) Honolulu, Hawaii, U.S.

Sport
- Sport: Swimming
- Strokes: Backstroke
- College team: Yale University
Medal record
Men's swimming
Representing the United States
Olympic Games
Gold medal – first place	1948 London	100 m backstroke
Pan American Games
Gold medal – first place	1951 Buenos Aires	100 m backstroke
Gold medal – first place	1951 Buenos Aires	3×100 m medley

Allen McIntyre Stack (January 23, 1928 – September 12, 1999) was an American competition swimmer, Olympic champion, and former world record-holder.

Stack won the gold medal in the men's 100-meter backstroke at the 1948 Summer Olympics in London. Four years later at the 1952 Summer Olympics in Helsinki, Finland. He placed fourth in the final of the same event.

Stack attended Yale University, where he swam for the Yale Bulldogs swimming and diving team in National Collegiate Athletic Association (NCAA) competition from 1947 to 1949. He graduated from Yale with a bachelor's degree in 1949. He served in the U.S. Navy from 1951 to 1954, and graduated from Columbia University Law School in 1956. He practiced law in Honolulu, Hawaii until 1998.

Stack was inducted into the International Swimming Hall of Fame as an "Honor Swimmer" in 1979.

== See also ==
- List of members of the International Swimming Hall of Fame
- List of Olympic medalists in swimming (men)
- List of Yale University people
- World record progression 200 metres backstroke
