= Fritze Carstensen =

Danish swimmer (1925–2005)

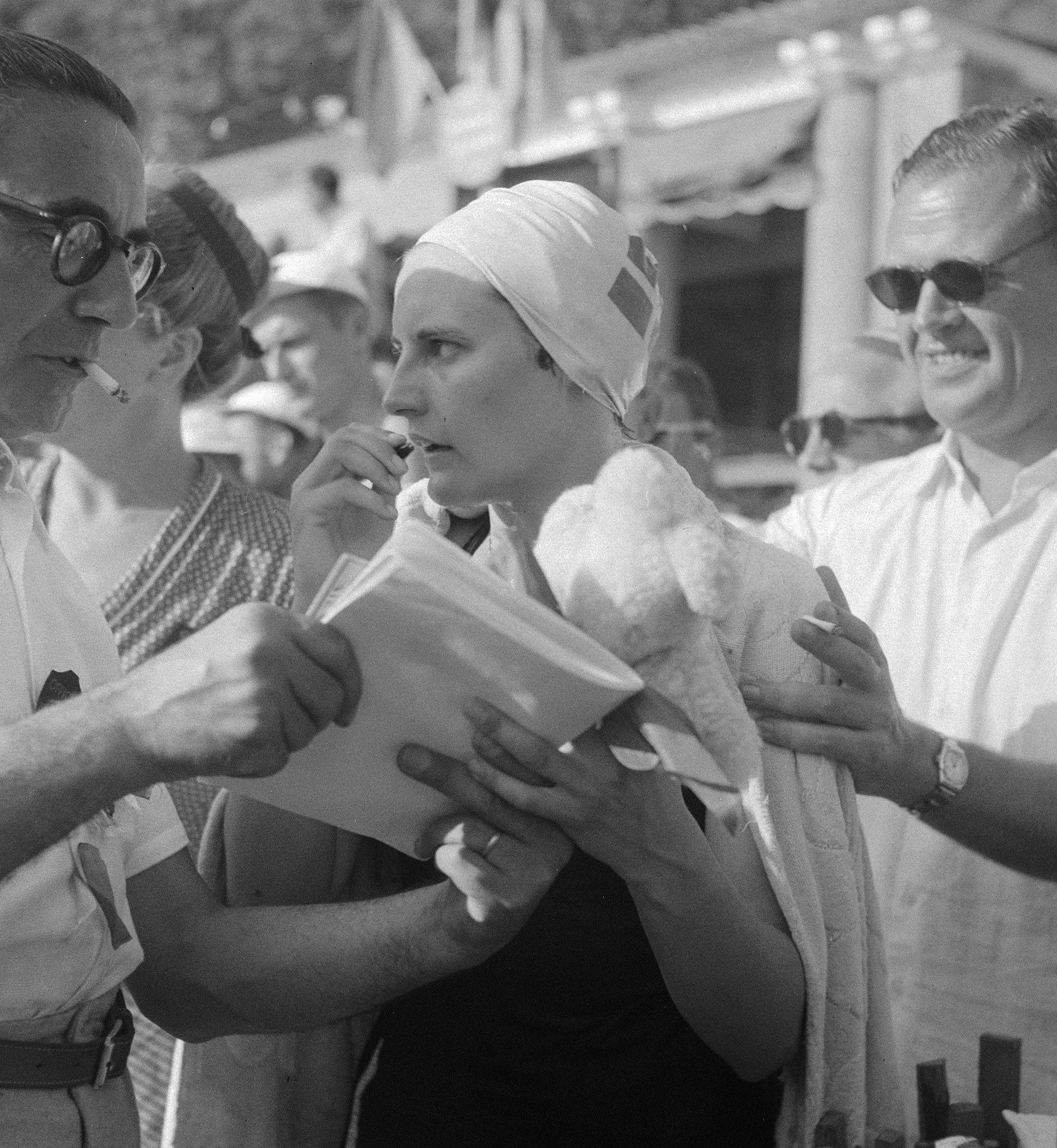
- Carstensen at the 1947 European Championships

Personal information
- Born: 18 July 1925 Aarhus, Denmark
- Died: 5 August 2005 (aged 80) Lyngby-Taarbæk, Denmark

Sport
- Sport: Swimming
- Strokes: Freestyle
- Club: DKG, Copenhagen
Medal record
Representing Denmark
Summer Olympics
Silver medal – second place	1948 London	4×100 m freestyle
European Championships (LC)
Gold medal – first place	1947 Monte Carlo	100 m freestyle
Gold medal – first place	1947 Monte Carlo	4×100 m freestyle

Fritze Wulff Carstensen (née Nathansen, 18 July 1925 – 5 August 2005) was a Danish freestyle swimmer. She won two European titles in 1947 and was part of the Danish 4 × 100 m relay team that won a silver medal at the 1948 Summer Olympics, where she placed seventh-eighth in her individual 100 m and 400 m events.
