= List of members of the International Swimming Hall of Fame =

The International Swimming Hall of Fame is a history museum and hall of fame, serving as the central point for the study of the history of swimming in the United States and around the world.

== List of the members of the International Swimming Hall of Fame ==
List of the members of the International Swimming Hall of Fame:

Name	Country	Category	Year of induction
Abdellatief Abouheif	Egypt	Open Water Swimmer	1998
Sebastian Salinas Abril	Peru	Contributor	1999
Erik Adlerz	Sweden	Pioneer Diver	1986
Rebecca Adlington	Great Britain	Swimmer	2018
Nathan Adrian	United States	Swimmer	2026
Vladimir Akimov	Soviet Union	Water Polo	2024
Husain Al-Musallam	Kuwait	Contributor	2025
Carmela Allucci	Italy	Water Polo	2024
Greta Andersen	Denmark	Swimmer	1969
Teresa Andersen	United States	Synchronized Swimmer	1986
Miller Anderson	United States	Diver	1967
Hannelore Anke	Germany	Swimmer	1990
Mayumi Aoki	Japan	Swimmer	1989
Shigeo Arai	Japan	Pioneer Swimmer	1997
Dave Armbruster	United States	Coach (Swimming)	1966
Duncan Armstrong	Australia	Swimmer	1996
Ransom Arthur	United States	Contributor	1990
Jane Asher	Great Britain	Masters Swimmer	2006
Paul Asmuth	United States	Open Water Swimmer	2010
Susie Atwood	United States	Swimmer	1992
Elena Azarova	Russia	Synchronized Swimmer	2016
Shirley Babashoff	United States	Swimmer	1982
Kristen Babb-Sprague	United States	Synchronized Swimmer	1999
Bill Bachrach	United States	Coach (Swimming)	1966
Catie Ball	United States	Swimmer	1976
István Bárány	Hungary	Swimmer	1978
Aleksei Barkalov	Soviet Union	Water Polo Player	1993
Mike Barrowman	United States	Swimmer	1997
Walter Bathe	Germany	Swimmer	1970
Sydney Battersby	Great Britain	Pioneer Swimmer	2007
Carl Bauer	United States	Contributor	1967
Sybil Bauer	United States	Swimmer	1967
Alex Baumann	Canada	Swimmer	1992
Dawn Pawson Bean	United States	Contributor/Synchronized Swimmer	1996
Amanda Beard	United States	Swimmer	2018
Craig Beardsley	United States	Swimmer	2022
Frank Beaurepaire	Australia	Swimmer	1967
Milivoj Bebić	Yugoslavia/Croatia	Water Polo Player	2013
Betty Becker-Pinkston	United States	Diver	1967
Franke Bell	United States	Coach (Swimming)	2017
Marilyn Bell	Canada	Open Water Swimmer	2022
Melissa Belote	United States	Swimmer	1983
Brooke Bennett	United States	Swimmer	2010
Tibor Benedek	Hungary	Water Polo Player	2016
Paul Bergen	United States/Canada	Coach (Swimming)	1998
David Berkoff	United States	Swimmer	2005
Alain Bernard	France	Swimmer	2017
Sylvie Bernier	Canada	Diver	1996
Kevin Berry	Australia	Swimmer	1980
Arno Bieberstein	Germany	Pioneer Swimmer	1988
Hobie Billingsley	United States	Coach (Diving)/Diver	1983
Matt Biondi	United States	Swimmer	1997
Péter Biros	Hungary	Water Polo Player	2016
Đurđica Bjedov	Yugoslavia/Croatia	Swimmer	1987
Thomas Blake	United States	Pioneer Contributor	1992
Ethelda Bleibtrey	United States	Swimmer	1967
Gérard Blitz	Belgium	Pioneer Swimmer/Water Polo Player	1990
András Bodnár	Hungary	Water Polo Player	2017
Phil Boggs	United States	Diver	1985
Jean Boiteux	France	Swimmer	1982
Arne Borg	Sweden	Swimmer	1966
Gustavo Borges	Brazil	Swimmer	2012
Joe Bottom	United States	Swimmer	2006
Bob Bowman	United States	Coach (Swimming)	2023
Simeon Boychenko	Soviet Union	Pioneer Swimmer	2016
Charlotte Boyle	United States	Pioneer Swimmer	1988
Paul Boyton	United States	Pioneer Contributor	1993
Walter Brack	Germany	Pioneer Swimmer	1997
Ernst Brandsten	United States/Sweden	Coach (Diving)	1966
Ma Braun	Netherlands	Coach (Swimming)	1967
Marie Braun	Netherlands	Swimmer	1980
Stan Brauninger	United States	Coach (Swimming/Diving)	1972
George Breen	United States	Swimmer	1975
Enith Brigitha	Netherlands	Swimmer	2015
David Browning	United States	Diver	1975
Jayne Owen Bruner	United States	Masters Swimmer	1998
Mike Bruner	United States	Swimmer	1988
Olga Brusnikina	Russia	Synchronized Swimmer	2009
Sandra Bucha	United States	Open Water Swimmer	2014
Perica Bukić	Yugoslavia/Croatia	Water Polo Player	2008
Andy Burke	United States	Contributor	2018
Lynn Burke	United States	Swimmer	1978
Rich Burns	United States	Masters Swimmer	2026
Mike Burton	United States	Swimmer	1977
Lesley Bush	United States	Diver	1986
Ray Bussard	United States	Coach (Swimming)	1999
Fred Cady	United States	Coach (Diving)	1969
Giorgio Cagnotto	Italy	Diver	1992
Tania Cagnotto	Italy	Diver	2026
Re Calcaterra	United States	Pioneer Contributor	2011
Michelle Calkins	Canada	Synchronized Swimmer	2001
Gloria Callen	United States	Swimmer	1984
Novella Calligaris	Italy	Swimmer	1986
James Malcolm Cameron	Great Britain	Contributor	2003
Michelle Cameron	Canada	Synchronized Swimmer	2000
Alessandro Campagna	Italy	Water Polo Player/Coach	2019
Jeannette Campbell	Argentina	Swimmer	1991
Tedford H. Cann	United States	Swimmer	1967
Joaquín Capilla	Mexico	Diver	1976
Patty Caretto	United States	Swimmer	1987
Rick Carey	United States	Swimmer	1993
Forbes Carlile	Australia	Coach (Swimming)	1976
Ursula Carlile	Australia	Coach (Swimming)	2022
Christine "Kiki" Caron	France	Swimmer	1998
Cathy Carr	United States	Swimmer	1988
Chris Carver	United States	Coach (Synchronized Swimming)	2023
Sid Cassidy	United States	Contributor	2026
Alberto Castagnetti	Italy	Coach (Swimming)	2013
Tracy Caulkins	United States	Swimmer	1990
Cavill family	Australia	Contributors (6)	1970
George Center	United States	Pioneer Coach (Swimming)	1991
Florence Chadwick	United States	Swimmer	1970
Jennifer Chandler	United States	Diver	1987
Boy Charlton	Australia	Swimmer	1972
Sherm Chavoor	United States	Coach (Swimming)	1977
Chen Ruolin	China	Diver	2025
César Cielo	Brazil	Swimmer	2023
S. Earl Clark	United States	Diver	1972
Steve Clark	United States	Swimmer	1966
Stefanie Clausen	Denmark	Pioneer Diver	1988
Dick Cleveland	United States	Swimmer	1991
Bob Clotworthy	United States	Diver	1980
Jack Cody	United States	Coach (Swimming/Diving)	1970
Tiffany Cohen	United States	Swimmer	1996
Georgia Coleman	United States	Diver	1966
Cecil Colwin	Canada/South Africa	Contributor	1993
Carin Cone	United States	Swimmer	1984
Bartolo Consolo	Italy	Contributor	2015
Brad Cooper	Australia	Swimmer	1994
Joyce Cooper	Great Britain	Pioneer Swimmer	1996
George Corsan Sr.	Canada	Contributor	1971
Candy Costie	United States	Synchronized Swimmer	1995
Frank Cotton	Australia	Pioneer Contributor	1989
Natalie Coughlin	United States	Swimmer	2022
James E. Counsilman	United States	Coach (Swimming)	1976
Jacques-Yves Cousteau	France	Contributor	1967
Kirsty Coventry	Zimbabwe	Swimmer	2023
Lynne Cox	United States	Open Water Swimmer	2000
Buster Crabbe	United States	Swimmer	1965
Lorraine Crapp	Australia	Swimmer	1972
Helen Crlenkovich	United States	Diver	1981
Ian Crocker	United States	Swimmer	2017
Ferenc Csik	Hungary	Swimmer	1983
László Cseh	Hungary	Swimmer	2026
Bert Cummins	Great Britain	Contributor	1974
Thomas K. Cureton Jr.	United States	Contributor	1980
Ann Curtis	United States	Swimmer	1966
Katherine Whitney Curtis	United States	Coach (Synchronized Swimming)	1979
Joy Cushman	United States	Pioneer Contributor	2018
Peter Daland	United States	Coach (Swimming)	1977
Giuseppe D'Altrui	Italy	Water Polo Player	2010
Marco D'Altrui	Italy	Water Polo Player	2010
Ellie Daniel	United States	Swimmer	1997
Charles Daniels	United States	Swimmer	1965
Tamás Darnyi	Hungary	Swimmer	2000
Flip Darr	United States	Coach (Swimming)	2006
Ray Daughters	United States	Coach (Swimming)	1971
John Davies	Australia	Swimmer	1984
Charlotte Davis	United States	Coach (Synchronized Swimming)	2014
Victor Davis	Canada	Swimmer	1994
Anastasia Davydova	Russia	Synchronized Swimmer	2017
William "Buck" Dawson	United States	Contributor	1986
Thea de Wit	Netherlands	Contributor	2005
Penny Lee Dean	United States	Open Water Swimmer	1996
Frédérik Deburghgraeve	Belgium	Swimmer	2008
Virginie Dedieu	France	Synchronized / Artistic Swimmer	2024
Richard Degener	United States	Diver	1971
Louis deBreda Handley	United States	Coach (Swimming/Water Polo)	1967
Inge de Bruijn	Netherlands	Swimmer	2009
Gianni De Magistris	Italy	Water Polo Player	1995
Rick DeMont	United States	Swimmer	1990
Frank Dempsey	United States	Diver	1996
Willy den Ouden	Netherlands	Swimmer	1970
Clare Dennis	Australia	Swimmer	1982
John Henry "Rob" Derbyshire	Great Britain	Pioneer Swimmer/Water Polo Player/Coach	2005
Pete Desjardins	United States	Diver	1966
Alexandre Despatie	Canada	Diver	2024
Donna de Varona	United States	Swimmer	1969
John Devitt	Australia	Swimmer	1979
Marcos Díaz	Dominican Republic	Swimmer	2012
Carlo Dibiasi	Italy	Pioneer Coach (Diving)	2006
Klaus Dibiasi	Italy	Diver	1981
Tom Dolan	United States	Swimmer	2006
Aleksandr Dolgushin	Soviet Union	Water Polo Player	2010
Leo Donath	Hungary	Pioneer Contributor	1988
Olga Dorfner	United States	Swimmer	1970
Lyle Draves	United States	Coach (Diving)	1989
Vicki Draves	United States	Diver	1969
Emile Georges Drigny	France	Contributor	1984
Taylor Drysdale	United States	Pioneer Swimmer	1994
Milena Duchková	Czechoslovakia	Diver	1983
Bob Duenkel	United States	Contributor	2020
Virginia Duenkel	United States	Swimmer	1985
Barbara Dunbar	United States	Masters Swimmer	2000
Fanny Durack	Australia	Swimmer	1967
Becky Dyroen-Lancer	United States	Synchronized Swimmer	2004
Gertrude Ederle	United States	Swimmer	1965
David Edgar	United States	Swimmer	1996
Krisztina Egerszegi	Hungary	Swimmer	2001
Kathy Ellis	United States	Swimmer	1991
Patsy Elsener	United States	Diver	2002
Gail Emery	United States	Coach (Synchronized Swimming)	2000
Kornelia Ender	East Germany	Swimmer	1981
Charlotte Epstein	United States	Contributor	1974
Jon Erikson	United States	Open Water Swimmer	2014
Anthony Ervin	United States	Swimmer	2025
Manuel Estiarte	Spain	Water Polo Player	2007
Janet Evans	United States	Swimmer	2001
Dick Eve	Australia	Pioneer Diver	1991
Tamás Faragó	Hungary	Water Polo Player	1993
John Faricy	United States	Pioneer Swimmer	1990
Jeff Farrell	United States	Swimmer	1968
Hans Fassnacht	Germany	Swimmer	1992
Jane Fauntz	United States	Pioneer Swimmer/Diver	1991
Cathy Ferguson	United States	Swimmer	1978
Harold Fern	Great Britain	Contributor	1974
Peter Fick	United States	Swimmer	1978
Jane Figueiredo	Zimbabwe	Coach (Diving)	2026
Sharon Finneran	United States	Swimmer	1985
Domenico Fioravanti	Italy	Swimmer	2012
Howard Firby	Canada	Coach (Swimming)	1985
Ralph Flanagan	United States	Swimmer	1978
Jennie Fletcher	Great Britain	Swimmer	1971
Alan Ford	United States	Swimmer	1966
Michelle Ford	Australia	Swimmer	1994
Gerald Forsberg	Great Britain	Pioneer Open Water Swimming Contributor	1998
Simone (Hankin) Fountain	Australia	Water Polo	2026
Benjamin Franklin	United States	Contributor	1968
Missy Franklin	United States	Swimmer	2023
Dawn Fraser	Australia	Swimmer	1965
Sylvie Fréchette	Canada	Synchronized Swimmer	2003
Mary Freeman	United States	Coach (Swimming)/Contributor	1988
Lars Frölander	Sweden	Swimmer	2024
Fu Mingxia	China	Diver	2005
Andrea Fuentes	Spain	Synchronized / Artistic Swimmer	2025
Ellen Fullard-Leo	United States	Contributor	1974
Patty Robinson Fulton	United States	Masters Diver	2001
Bruce Furniss	United States	Swimmer	1987
Hironoshin Furuhashi	Japan	Swimmer	1967
Masaru Furukawa	Japan	Swimmer	1981
Rowdy Gaines	United States	Swimmer	1995
Harry Gallagher	Australia	Coach (Swimming)	1984
Claire Galligan	United States	Swimmer	1970
Don Gambril	United States	Coach (Swimming)	1983
Gao Min	China	Diver	1998
Eleanor Garatti-Saville	United States	Pioneer Swimmer	1992
James Gaughran	United States	Coach (Water Polo/Swimming)	2015
Tim Garton	United States	Masters Swimmer	1997
George Gate	Canada	Coach (Swimming)	1989
Terry Gathercole	Australia	Swimmer	1985
Marjorie Gestring	United States	Diver	1976
Carlos Girón	Mexico	Diver	2001
Harry Glancy	United States	Pioneer Swimmer	1990
Mercedes Gleitze	Great Britain	Pioneer Open Water Swimmer	2014
Eldon Godfrey	Canada	Contributor	2012
Tom Gompf	United States	Contributor	2002
Brian Goodell	United States	Swimmer	1986
Leo Goodwin	United States	Swimmer	1971
Horst Gorlitz	East Germany/Italy/France	Pioneer Coach (Diving)	2016
Frank Gorman	United States	Pioneer Diver	2016
Sue Gossick	United States	Diver	1988
Shane Gould	Australia	Swimmer	1977
Jed Graef	United States	Swimmer	1988
Judy Grinham	Great Britain	Swimmer	1981
Larry Griswold	United States	Pioneer Comedy Diver	2010
Michael Gross	Germany	Swimmer	1995
Irene Guest	United States	Pioneer Swimmer	1990
Beulah Gundling	United States	Aquatic Artist	1965
Fritz Gunst	Germany	Pioneer Water Polo Player	1990
Paul Günther	Germany	Pioneer Diver	1988
Guo Jingjing	China	Diver	2016
Bridgette Gusterson	Australia	Water Polo Player	2017
Frank Guthrie	Australia	Coach (Swimming)	1991
Andrea Gyarmati	Hungary	Swimmer	1995
Dezső Gyarmati	Hungary	Water Polo Player	1976
Valéria Gyenge	Hungary	Swimmer	1978
Dániel Gyurta	Hungary	Swimmer	2024
Grant Hackett	Australia	Swimmer	2014
Russ Hafferkamp	United States	Water Polo	2008
George Haines	United States	Coach (Swimming)	1977
Alfréd Hajós	Hungary	Swimmer	1966
Olivér Halassy	Hungary	Water Polo Player	1978
Gary Hall Jr.	United States	Swimmer	2013
Gary Hall Sr.	United States	Swimmer	1981
Kaye Hall	United States	Swimmer	1979
Zoltán Halmay	Hungary	Swimmer	1968
Tetsuo Hamuro	Japan	Swimmer	1990
Jamison Handy	United States	Contributor	1965
Brendan Hansen	United States	Swimmer	2020
Dick Hannula	United States	Coach (Swimming)	1987
Ursula Happe	Germany	Swimmer	1997
Phyllis Harding	Great Britain	Swimmer	1995
Bruce Harlan	United States	Diver	1973
Don Harper	United States	Diver	1998
Joan Harrison	South Africa	Swimmer	1982
Karen Harup	Denmark	Swimmer	1975
Shiro Hashizume	Japan	Swimmer	1992
John Gatenby "Jack" Hatfield	Great Britain	Swimmer/Water Polo Player	1984
Cecil Healy	Australia	Swimmer	1981
George Hearn	Great Britain	Pioneer Contributor	1986
Peter Heatly	Great Britain	Contributor	2016
Harry Hebner	United States	Swimmer	1968
Jerry Heidenreich	United States	Swimmer	1992
Bob Helmick	United States	Contributor	2007
John Hencken	United States	Swimmer	1988
Jan Henne	United States	Swimmer	1979
Harold Henning	United States	Contributor	1979
Thor Henning	Sweden	Pioneer Swimmer	1992
Jon Henricks	Australia	Swimmer	1973
Jodie Henry	Australia	Swimmer	2015
William Henry	Great Britain	Contributor	1974
Sam Herford	Australia	Coach (Swimming)	1992
Beatrice Hess	France	Swimmer	2026
Penelope Heyns	South Africa	Swimmer	2007
Charlie Hickcox	United States	Swimmer	1976
John Higgins	United States	Swimmer	1971
Takashi "Halo" Hirose	United States	Pioneer Swimmer	2017
Thomas Hoad	Australia	Contributor	2011
George Hodgson	Canada	Swimmer	1968
Falk Hoffmann	East Germany	Diver	1999
Robert M. Hoffman	United States	Pioneer Contributor	2001
Peg Hogan	United States	Masters Synchronized Swimmer	2002
Nancy Hogshead	United States	Swimmer	1994
Harry Holiday	United States	Swimmer	1991
Steve Holland	Australia	Swimmer	1989
Eleanor Holm	United States	Swimmer	1966
Frederick Holman	Great Britain	Pioneer Swimmer	1988
Márton Homonnai	Hungary	Water Polo Player	1971
Ernst Hoppenberg	Germany	Pioneer Swimmer	1988
Bruce Hopping	United States	Pioneer Contributor	2014
Richard R. Hough	United States	Swimmer	1970
Peter Hürzeler	Switzerland	Contributor	2022
Hu Jia	China	Diver	2013
Chad Hundeby	United States	Open Water Swimmer	2012
Hungarian Water Polo Team 2000-2008	Hungary	Water Polo Team	2016
Virginia Hunt Newman	United States	Pioneer Contributor	1993
Stefen Hunyadfi	Hungary/Italy/United States	Coach (Swimming)	1969
Ralph Hutton	Canada	Swimmer	1984
Ragnhild Hveger	Denmark	Swimmer	1966
Horacio Iglesias	Argentina	Open Water Swimmer	2003
Larisa Ilchenko	Russia	Swimmer	2016
Natalia Ischenko	Russia	Synchronized / Artistic Swimmer	2023
Tom Jager	United States	Swimmer	2001
Hilda James	Great Britain	Pioneer Swimmer	2016
Zoran Janković	Yugoslavia	Water Polo Player	2004
Alexandre Jany	France	Swimmer	1977
John Arthur Jarvis	Great Britain	Swimmer	1968
Chet Jastremski	United States	Swimmer	1977
Otylia Jędrzejczak	Poland	Swimmer	2019
Zdravko Ježić	Yugoslavia	Water Polo Player	2010
Dick Jochums	United States	Coach (Swimming)	2017
Greta Johansson	Sweden	Diver	1973
Hjalmar Johansson	Sweden	Pioneer Diver/Contributor	1982
Gail Johnson	United States	Synchronized Swimmer	1983
Graham Johnston	United States	Masters Swimmer	1998
Leisel Jones	Australia	Swimmer	2017
Karen Josephson	United States	Synchronized Swimmer	1997
Sarah Josephson	United States	Synchronized Swimmer	1997
Aleksandr Kabanov	Soviet Union	Water Polo Player	2001
Lina Kačiušytė	Soviet Union	Swimmer	1998
Duke Kahanamoku	United States	Swimmer	1965
Irina Kalinina	Soviet Union	Diver	1990
Marion Kane	United States	Coach (Synchronized Swimming)	1981
Masako Kaneko	Japan	Coach (Synchronized Swimming)	2015
György Kárpáti	Hungary	Water Polo Player	1982
Tamás Kásás	Hungary	Water Polo Player	2016
Kouji Katoh	Japan	Coach (Swimming)	2001
Beth Kaufman	United States	Contributor	1967
Warren Kealoha	United States	Swimmer	1968
Annette Kellermann	Australia	Contributor	1974
Dénes Kemény	Hungary	Coach (Water Polo)	2011
Edward T. Kennedy	United States	Contributor	1966
Skip Kenney	United States	Coach (Swimming)	2004
Elvira Khasyanova	Russia	Synchronized Swimmer	2020
Adolph Kiefer	United States	Swimmer	1965
Benard Kieran	Australia	Swimmer	1969
Lenore Kight	United States	Swimmer	1981
Dick Kimball	United States	Coach (Diving)/Diver	1985
Micki King	United States	Diver	1978
John Kinsella	United States	Swimmer	1986
Cor Kint	Netherlands	Swimmer	1971
Robert Kiphuth	United States	Coach (Swimming)	1965
Mariya Kiselyova	Russia	Synchronized Swimmer	2010
Gergely Kiss	Hungary	Water Polo Player	2016
László Kiss	Hungary	Coach (Swimming)	2012
Kosuke Kitajima	Japan	Swimmer	2023
Kusuo Kitamura	Japan	Swimmer	1965
Masaji Kiyokawa	Japan	Swimmer	1978
Michael Klim	Australia	Swimmer	2022
Heinz Kluetmeier	United States	Contributor	2017
Ulrika Knape	Sweden	Diver	1982
Reizo Koike	Japan	Pioneer Swimmer	1996
George Kojac	United States	Swimmer	1968
Ada Kok	Netherlands	Swimmer	1976
Mary Kok	Netherlands	Swimmer	1980
Claudia Kolb	United States	Swimmer	1975
Béla Komjádi	Hungary	Water Polo Player	1995
Ford Konno	United States	Swimmer	1972
John and Ilsa Konrads	Australia	Swimmers	1971
Mikako Kotani	Japan	Synchronized Swimmer	2007
Rosemarie Kother	East Germany	Swimmer	1986
Zdravko-Ćiro Kovačić	Yugoslavia/Croatia	Water Polo Player	1984
Ingrid Krämer	East Germany	Diver	1975
Barbara Krause	East Germany	Swimmer	1988
June Krauser	United States	Contributor	1994
Lenny Krayzelburg	United States	Swimmer	2011
Ranomi Kromowidjojo	Netherlands	Swimmer	2026
Harold Kruger	United States	Pioneer Swimmer/Diver	1986
Louis Kuehn	United States	Pioneer Diver	1988
Karin Kuipers	Netherlands	Water Polo Player	2014
Ethel Lackie	United States	Swimmer	1969
Giorgio Lamberti	Italy	Swimmer	2004
Clara LaMore	United States	Masters Swimmer	1995
Frederick Lane	Australia	Swimmer	1969
Ludy Langer	United States	Pioneer Swimmer	1988
Gus Langner	United States	Masters Swimmer	1995
Lao Lishi	China	Diver	2015
Mustapha Larfaoui	Algeria	Contributor	1998
Lance Larson	United States	Swimmer	1980
Gunnar Larsson	Sweden	Swimmer	1979
Irina Lashko	Soviet Union/Russia/Australia	Diver	2018
Walter Laufer	United States	Swimmer	1973
Laurie Lawrence	Australia	Coach (Swimming)	1996
Stéphane Lecat	France	Open Water Swimmer	2023
Sammy Lee	United States	Diver	1968
Dezső Lemhényi	Hungary	Water Polo Player/Coach/Contributor	1998
Kelley Lemmon	United States	Masters Swimmer	1999
Harry LeMoyne	United States	Pioneer Swimmer	1988
Maria Lenk	Brazil	Swimmer	1988
Mark Lenzi	United States	Diver	2003
Jason Lezak	United States	Swimmer	2019
Li Ting	China	Diver	2019
Liang Boxi	China	Pioneer Diver	2015
Kim Linehan	United States	Swimmer	1997
Bill Lippman Jr.	United States	Contributor	1995
Danyon Loader	New Zealand	Swimmer	2003
Ryan Lochte	United States	Swimmer	2026
Wilbert E. Longfellow	United States	Contributor	1965
Anita Lonsbrough	Great Britain	Swimmer	1983
Gianni Lonzi	Italy	Water Polo Player/Coach/Administrator	2009
Martín López-Zubero	Spain	Swimmer	2004
Alice Lord Landon	United States	Pioneer Swimmer/Contributor	1993
Greg Louganis	United States	Diver	1993
Frederick Luehring	United States	Contributor	1974
Steve Lundquist	United States	Swimmer	1990
Laure Manaudou	France	Swimmer	2017
Cornel Mărculescu	Romania	Contributor	2010
David Marsh	United States	Coach (Swimming)	2020
Diana Mocanu	Romania	Swimmer	2015
Marcella MacDonald	United States	Open Water Swimmer	2019
Lillian MacKellar	United States/Canada/New Zealand	Pioneer Coach/Contributor/Synchronized Swimmer	1993
Helene Madison	United States	Swimmer	1966
Hideko Maehata	Japan	Swimmer	1979
Mario Majoni	Italy	Water Polo Player	1972
Shozo Makino	Japan	Swimmer	1991
Håkan Malmrot	Sweden	Swimmer	1980
Matt Mann II	United States/Great Britain	Coach (Swimming)	1965
Shelley Mann	United States	Swimmer	1966
Thompson Mann	United States	Swimmer	1984
Kálmán Markovits	Hungary	Water Polo Player	1994
John Marshall	Australia	Swimmer	1973
G. Harold Martin	United States	Pioneer Contributor	1999
Rie Mastenbroek	Netherlands	Swimmer	1968
Ikkaku Matsuzawa	Japan	Coach (Swimming)	2009
Roland Matthes	East Germany	Swimmer	1981
Mihály Mayer	Hungary	Water Polo Player	1987
Charles McCaffree	United States	Contributor	1976
Glenn McCormick	United States	Coach (Diving)	1995
Kelly McCormick	United States	Diver	1999
Pat McCormick	United States	Diver	1965
Michael "Turk" McDermott	United States	Swimmer	1969
Linda McGill	Australia	Swimmer	1968
Perry McGillivray	United States	Swimmer	1981
Judy McGowan	United States	Contributor/Synchronized Swimmer	2009
Margo McGrath	United States	Synchronized Swimmer	1989
Tim McKee	United States	Swimmer	1998
Don McKenzie	United States	Swimmer	1989
Josephine McKim	United States	Pioneer Swimmer	1991
Frank McKinney	United States	Swimmer	1975
Jimmy McLane	United States	Swimmer	1970
Mary T. Meagher	United States	Swimmer	1993
Helen Meany	United States	Diver	1971
Jack Medica	United States	Swimmer	1966
Oussama Mellouli	Tunisia	Open Water Swimmer	2025
Maxine Merlino	United States	Masters Swimmer	1999
Leonid Meshkov	Russia	Pioneer Swimmer	2016
Caren Metschuck	East Germany	Swimmer	1990
Debbie Meyer	United States	Swimmer	1977
Igor Milanović	Yugoslavia	Water Polo Player	2006
Alban Minville	France	Coach (Swimming)	1980
Radovan Miškov	Croatia	Masters Water Polo Player	2014
Matthew Mitcham	Australia	Diver	2022
Betsy Mitchell	United States	Swimmer	1998
Michele Mitchell	United States	Diver	1995
Yasuji Miyazaki	Japan	Swimmer	1981
Karen Moe	United States	Swimmer	1992
Endre Molnár	Hungary	Water Polo Player	2025
Tamás Molnár	Hungary	Water Polo Player	2016
Jim Montgomery	United States	Swimmer	1986
Peter Montgomery	Australia	Contributor	2013
Belle Moore	Great Britain	Pioneer Swimmer	1989
Adrian Moorhouse	Great Britain	Swimmer	1999
Pablo Morales	United States	Swimmer	1998
Phil Moriarty	United States	Coach (Swimming)	1980
Pamela Morris	United States	Synchronized Swimmer/Swimmer	1965
Lucy Morton	Great Britain	Pioneer Swimmer	1988
Bob Mowerson	United States	Coach (Swimming)	1986
Ardeth Mueller	United States	Masters Swimmer	1996
Camille Muffat	France	Swimmer	2016
Bob Muir	United States	Pioneer Coach (Swimming)	1989
Debbie Muir	Canada	Coach (Synchronized Swimming)	2007
Karen Muir	South Africa	Swimmer	1980
Bill Mulliken	United States	Swimmer	1984
Felipe Muñoz	Mexico	Swimmer	1991
Katsuyoshi Murakami	Japan	Coach (Swimming)	1997
Kevin Murphy	Great Britain	Open Water Swimmer	2009
Paula Jean Myers-Pope	United States	Diver	1979
John Naber	United States	Swimmer	1982
Sachin Nag	India	Pioneer Swimmer	2025
Jiro Nagasawa	Japan	Swimmer	1993
Alfred Nakache	France	Pioneer Swimmer	2019
Keo Nakama	United States	Swimmer	1975
Anita Nall	United States	Swimmer	2008
Gail Neall	Australia	Swimmer	1996
Sandy Neilson	United States	Swimmer	1986
Jack Nelson	United States	Coach (Swimming)	1994
János Németh	Hungary	Water Polo Player	1969
Anthony Nesty	Suriname	Swimmer	1998
Dale Neuburger	United States	Contributor	2024
Paul Neumann	Austria	Pioneer Swimmer	1986
Al Neuschaefer	United States	Coach (Swimming)	1967
Megan Neyer	United States	Diver	1997
Cindy Nicholas	Canada	Open Water Swimmer	2005
Monte Nitzkowski	United States	Coach (Water Polo)	1991
Martha Norelius	United States	Swimmer	1967
Eva and Ilona Novák	Hungary	Swimmers	1973
Ian O'Brien	Australia	Swimmer	1985
Ron O'Brien	United States	Coach (Diving)/Diver	1988
Wally O'Connor	United States	Water Polo Player	1966
Susie O'Neill	Australia	Swimmer	2006
Heidi O'Rourke	United States	Synchronized Swimmer	1980
Norma Olsen	United States	Pioneer Contributor	1998
Zoe Ann Olsen	United States	Diver	1989
Yoshiko Osaki	Japan	Masters Swimmer	2005
Albina Osipowich	United States	Pioneer Swimmer	1986
Javier Ostos	Mexico	Contributor	1981
Anne Ottenbrite	Canada	Swimmer	1999
Kristin Otto	East Germany	Swimmer	1993
Yoshi Oyakawa	United States	Swimmer	1973
Henri Padou	France	Water Polo Player	1970
Yulia Pakhalina	Russia	Diver	2024
Denis Pankratov	Russia	Swimmer	2004
Richard Papenguth	United States	Coach (Swimming/Diving)	1986
Frank Parrington	Great Britain	Pioneer Diver	1986
Al Patnik	United States	Diver	1969
Sue Pedersen	United States	Swimmer	1995
Aaron Peirsol	United States	Swimmer	2016
Federica Pellegrini	Italy	Swimmer	2025
Peng Bo	China	Diver	2014
Mike Peppe	United States	Coach (Swimming/Diving)	1966
Kieren Perkins	Australia	Swimmer	2006
Heather Petri	United States	Water Polo	2023
Michael Phelps	United States	Swimmer	2023
William Berge Phillips	Australia	Contributor	1997
Bernat Picornell	Spain	Pioneer Contributor	1993
Clarence Pinkston	United States	Coach (Diving)	1966
Karlyn Pipes	United States	Masters Swimmer	2015
Eraldo Pizzo	Italy	Water Polo Player	1990
Joseph Pletinckx	Belgium	Pioneer Water Polo Player	1988
Walter Poenisch	United States	Pioneer Open Water Swimmer	2017
Igor Polyansky	Soviet Union	Swimmer	2002
Andrea Pollack	East Germany	Swimmer	1987
Alexander Popov	Russia	Swimmer	2009
Boris Popov	Soviet Union/Russia	Coach (Water Polo)	2019
Cynthia Potter	United States	Diver	1987
Dorothy Poynton-Hill	United States	Diver	1968
William Prew	United States	Pioneer Swimmer	1998
Galina Prozumenshchikova	Soviet Union	Swimmer	1977
Dennis Pursley	United States	Coach (Swimming)	2024
Richard Quick	United States	Coach (Swimming)	2000
Erich Rademacher	Germany	Swimmer/Water Polo Player	1972
Paul Radmilovic	Great Britain	Water Polo Player	1967
Brock Railey	United States	Swimmer	2011
Béla Rajki	Hungary	Contributor	1996
Sam Ramsamy	South Africa	Contributor	2023
Emil Rausch	Germany	Swimmer	1968
Austin Rawlinson	Great Britain	Pioneer Swimmer	1994
Katherine Rawls	United States	Swimmer/Diver	1965
Michael Read	Great Britain	Contributor	2011
Carol Redmond	United States	Synchronized Swimmer	1989
Eddie Reese	United States	Coach (Swimming)	2002
Randy Reese	United States	Coach (Swimming)	2005
Rica Reinisch	East Germany	Swimmer	1989
Desmond Renford	Australia	Open Water Swimmer	2016
Stephanie Rice	Australia	Swimmer	2019
Ulrike Richter	East Germany	Swimmer	1983
Aileen Riggin	United States	Swimmer/Diver	1967
Mickey Riley	United States	Diver	1977
Wally Ris	United States	Swimmer	1966
Richard Max Ritter	United States/Germany	Contributor	1965
David H. Robertson	United States	Contributor/Coach (Swimming)	1989
Carl Robie	United States	Swimmer	1976
Tom Robinson	United States	Coach (Swimming)	1975
Jesús Rollán	Spain	Water Polo Player	2012
Gail Roper	United States	Masters Swimmer	1997
Billy Rose	United States	Contributor	1995
Murray Rose	Australia	Swimmer	1965
Anne Ross	United States	Diver	1984
Clarence Ross	United States	Pioneer Swimmer	1988
Norman Ross	United States	Swimmer	1967
Norbert Rózsa	Hungary	Swimmer	2005
Dick Roth	United States	Swimmer	1987
Keena Rothhammer	United States	Swimmer	1991
Jeff Rouse	United States	Swimmer	2001
Cesare Rubini	Italy	Water Polo Player	2000
Joe Ruddy	United States	Pioneer Water Polo Player	1986
Ray Rude	United States	Contributor	1992
Ratko Rudić	Yugoslavia/Italy/United States/Croatia	Coach (Water Polo)	2007
Tracie Ruiz	United States	Synchronized Swimmer	1993
Doug Russell	United States	Swimmer	1985
Sylvia Ruuska	United States	Swimmer	1976
Roy Saari	United States	Swimmer	1976
Yevgeny Sadovyi	Soviet Union/Russia	Swimmer	1999
Soichi Sakamoto	United States	Coach (Swimming)	1966
Ferenc Salamon	Hungary	Contributor	2019
Vladimir Salnikov	Soviet Union	Swimmer	1993
Summer Sanders	United States	Swimmer	2002
Mirko Sandić	Yugoslavia	Water Polo Player	1999
Imre Sárosi	Hungary	Coach (Swimming)	1981
Norman Sarsfield	Great Britain	Contributor	2014
Dmitri Sautin	Russia	Diver	2016
Charlie Sava	United States	Coach (Swimming)	1970
Jill Savery	United States	Synchronized Swimmer	2008
E. Carroll Schaeffer	United States	Swimmer	1968
Otto Scheff	Austria	Pioneer Swimmer	1988
Walt Schlueter	United States	Coach (Swimming)	1978
Petra Schneider	East Germany	Swimmer	1989
Nathalie Schneyder	United States	Synchronized Swimmer	2013
Al Schoenfield	United States	Contributor	1985
Clarke Scholes	United States	Swimmer	1980
Don Schollander	United States	Swimmer	1965
Joseph Schooling	Singapore	Swimmer	2025
Hilde Schrader	Germany	Pioneer Swimmer	1994
Terry Schroeder	United States	Water Polo Player	2002
Mark Schubert	United States	Coach (Swimming)	1997
Carolyn Schuler	United States	Swimmer	1989
Olga Sedakova	Russia	Synchronized Swimmer	2019
Suhan Selduz	Turkey	Water Polo Player	1982
Peg Seller	Canada	Pioneer Synchronized Swimmer/Coach	1988
Nida Senff	Netherlands	Swimmer	1983
Yevgeny Sharonov	Soviet Union	Water Polo Player	2003
Tim Shaw	United States	Swimmer/Water Polo Player	1989
George Sheldon	United States	Pioneer Diver	1989
Jon Sieben	Australia	Swimmer	2022
Erwin Sietas	Germany	Pioneer Swimmer	1992
Carlo Silipo	Italy	Water Polo Player	2014
Charles Silvia	United States	Contributor	1976
Farid Simaika	Egypt	Diver	1982
Heather Simmons-Carrasco	United States	Synchronized / Artistic Swimmer	2026
Kenneth Sitzberger	United States	Diver	1994
Robert Skelton	United States	Pioneer Swimmer	1988
Jonty Skinner	South Africa	Swimmer	1985
Bill Smith	United States	Swimmer	1966
Caroline Smith	United States	Pioneer Diver	1988
Charles Smith	Great Britain	Water Polo Player	1981
Dick Smith	United States	Coach (Diving)	1979
Harold Smith	United States	Diver	1979
Jimmy Smith	United States	Pioneer Water Polo Player	1992
R. Jackson Smith	United States	Contributor	1983
Deryk Snelling	Canada/Great Britain	Coach (Swimming)	1993
Aleksandar Šoštar	SFR/FR Yugoslavia	Water Polo Player	2011
Spence Brothers: Walter, Leonard, Wallace	British Guiana	Swimmers	1967
Mark Spitz	United States	Swimmer	1977
Allen Stack	United States	Swimmer	1979
Gus Stager	United States	Coach (Swimming)	1982
Charles Steedman	Great Britain/Australia	Contributor	2000
Britta Steffen	Germany	Swimmer	2019
Carrie Steinseifer	United States	Swimmer	1999
Jan Stender	Netherlands	Coach (Swimming)	1973
Jill Sterkel	United States	Swimmer	2002
Melvin Stewart	United States	Swimmer	2002
Edward Stickles	United States	Swimmer	1995
Tom Stock	United States	Swimmer	1989
Sharon Stouder	United States	Swimmer	1972
Juno Stover-Irwin	United States	Diver	1980
Petar Stoychev	Bulgaria	Open Water Swimmer	2018
Alison Streeter	Great Britain	Open Water Swimmer	2006
Gus Sundstrom	United States	Pioneer Coach (Swimming)/Contributor	1995
Daichi Suzuki	Japan	Swimmer	2022
Sun Shuwei	China	Diver	2007
Bill Sweetenham	Australia	Coach (Swimming)	2018
Clyde Swendsen	United States	Pioneer Diver/Coach/Water Polo Player	1991
Zoltán Szécsi	Hungary	Water Polo Player	2016
Éva Székely	Hungary	Swimmer	1976
István Szívós, Jr	Hungary	Water Polo Player	1996
István Szívós, Sr	Hungary	Water Polo Player	1997
Katalin Szőke	Hungary	Swimmer	1985
Miya Tachibana	Japan	Synchronized Swimmer	2011
Ray Taft	United States	Masters Swimmer	1996
Nobutaka Taguchi	Japan	Swimmer	1987
Katsuo Takaishi	Japan	Pioneer Swimmer	1991
Miho Takeda	Japan	Synchronized Swimmer	2018
Don Talbot	Australia	Coach (Swimming)	1979
Tan Liangde	China	Diver	2000
Satoko Tanaka	Japan	Swimmer	1991
Elaine Tanner	Canada	Swimmer	1980
Jean Taris	France	Swimmer	1984
Ulrike Tauber	East Germany	Swimmer	1988
Henry Taylor	Great Britain	Swimmer	1969
June Taylor	Canada	Pioneer Synchronized Swimmer	1991
Shelley Taylor-Smith	Australia	Open Water Swimmer	2008
Stella Taylor	United States	Marathon Swimmer	1982
Noboru Terada	Japan	Pioneer Swimmer	1994
Mark Tewksbury	Canada	Swimmer	2000
David Theile	Australia	Swimmer	1968
Monfieur Thevenot	France	Pioneer Contributor	1990
Nick Thierry	Canada	Contributor	2001
Petria Thomas	Australia	Swimmer	2010
Ralph Thomas	Great Britain	Pioneer Contributor	2004
Jenny Thompson	United States	Swimmer	2009
Nort Thornton	United States	Coach (Swimming)	1995
Ian Thorpe	Australia	Swimmer	2011
Petra Thümer	East Germany	Swimmer	1987
Stan Tinkham	United States	Coach (Swimming)	1989
Gary Tobian	United States	Diver	1978
Dara Torres	United States	Swimmer	2016
Kenneth Treadway	United States	Contributor	1983
Libby Trickett	Australia	Swimmer	2018
Gregg Troy	United States	Coach (Swimming)	2026
Mike Troy	United States	Swimmer	1971
John Trudgen	Great Britain	Contributor	1974
Ivo Trumbić	Yugoslavia/Netherlands	Water Polo Player/Coach	2015
Yoshiyuki Tsuruta	Japan	Swimmer	1968
Jon Urbanchek	United States	Coach (Swimming)	2008
USA Women's 4x100 Relay Team 1976	United States	Relay Team	2024
Elena Vaytsekhovskaya	Soviet Union	Diver	1992
Laura Val	United States	Masters Swimmer	2003
Georges Vallerey Jr.	France	Pioneer Swimmer	2017
Franziska van Almsick	Germany	Swimmer	2010
Judith de Nijs	Netherlands	Open Water Swimmer	2014
Pieter van den Hoogenband	Netherlands	Swimmer	2013
Irene van der Laan	Netherlands	Open Water Swimmer	2015
Maarten van der Weijden	Netherlands	Open Water Swimmer	2017
Amy Van Dyken	United States	Swimmer	2007
Iet van Feggelen	Netherlands	Pioneer Swimmer	2009
Nel van Vliet	Netherlands	Swimmer	1973
Helen Vanderburg	Canada	Synchronized Swimmer	1985
Al Vande Weghe	United States	Swimmer	1990
Vladimir Vasin	Soviet Union	Diver	1991
Jesse Vassallo	United States	Swimmer	1997
Joe Verdeur	United States	Swimmer	1966
Mirko Vičević	Yugoslavia	Water Polo Player	2022
Penny and Vicky Vilagos	Canada	Synchronized Swimmers	2014
Kay Vilen	United States	Coach (Synchronized Swimming)	1978
Brenda Villa	United States	Water Polo Player	2018
Matt Vogel	United States	Swimmer	1996
Dana Vollmer	United States	Swimmer	2024
Herb Vollmer	United States	Pioneer Swimmer	1990
Chris von Saltza	United States	Swimmer	1966
Otto Wahle	Austria/United States	Pioneer Swimmer/Contributor	1996
Helen Wainwright	United States	Swimmer/Diver	1972
Carolyn Waldo	Canada	Synchronized Swimmer	1994
Ross Wales	United States	Contributor	2004
C. W. Wallis	Australia	Pioneer Contributor	1986
Gottlob Walz	Germany	Pioneer Diver	1988
Debbie Watson	Australia	Water Polo Player	2008
Don Watson	United States	Coach (Swimming)	2015
Lillian Watson	United States	Swimmer	1984
Marshall Wayne	United States	Diver	1981
Mary Wayte	United States	Swimmer	2000
Matthew Webb	Great Britain	Swimmer	1965
Robert Webster	United States	Diver	1970
Mariechen Wehselau	United States	Pioneer Swimmer	1989
Johnny Weissmuller	United States	Swimmer	1965
Kim Welshons	United States	Synchronized Swimmer	1988
Michael Wenden	Australia	Swimmer	1979
Al White	United States	Diver	1965
Beverley Whitfield	Australia	Swimmer	1995
Sharon Wichman	United States	Swimmer	1991
Alick Wickham	Solomon Islands	Contributor	1974
Tracey Wickham	Australia	Swimmer	1992
Albert Wiggins	United States	Swimmer	1994
Monique Wildschut	Netherlands	Open Water Swimmer	2016
David Wilkie	Great Britain	Swimmer	1982
George Wilkinson	Great Britain	Water Polo Player	1980
Laura Wilkinson	United States	Diver	2017
Herman Willemse	Netherlands	Open Water Swimmer	2008
Esther Williams	United States	Contributor	1966
Craig Wilson	United States	Water Polo Player	2005
William Wilson	Great Britain	Pioneer Contributor	2003
Bob Windle	Australia	Swimmer	1990
Margaret Woodbridge	United States	Pioneer Swimmer	1989
Cynthia Woodhead	United States	Swimmer	1994
Bernie Wrightson	United States	Diver	1984
Wu Chuanyu	China	Pioneer Swimmer	2017
Wu Minxia	China	Diver	2023
Wendy Wyland	United States	Diver	2001
Mina Wylie	Australia	Swimmer	1975
Xiong Ni	China	Diver	2006
Xu Yanmei	China	Diver	2000
Xu Yiming	China	Coach (Diving)	2003
Tsuyoshi Yamanaka	Japan	Swimmer	1983
Anastasiya Yermakova	Russia	Synchronized Swimmer	2015
Teófilo Yldefonso	Philippines	Pioneer Swimmer	2010
William Yorzyk	United States	Swimmer	1971
Masanori Yusa	Japan	Pioneer Swimmer	1992
Georg Zacharias	Germany	Pioneer Swimmer	2002
Carol Zaleski	United States	Contributor	2022
Zhang Xiuwei	China	Diver	2017
Zhou Jihong	China	Diver	1994
Andrés "Bandy" Zolyomy	Hungary/Italy/Spain	Coach (Water Polo)	2010
Trischa Zorn	United States	Paralympic Swimmer	2023
Alberto Zorrilla	Argentina	Swimmer	1976
Albert Zürner	Germany	Pioneer Diver	1988
