= FINA Synchronised Swimming World Cup =

The FINA Synchronised Swimming World Cup is an international, synchronized swimming event organized by FINA and currently held every 4 years. It is a top-level international 'synchro' competition. It was first held in 1979, and 2010 saw its twelfth edition.

The event features competition in four different synchro events (Solo, Duet, Team and Free Combination), and allows each entered nation to have 1 entrant per event. The winner of the event is determined by adding a nations points from the four events. (Note: Free Combination was added to the event beginning in 2006.)

As of 2012, Canada, Japan and the USA are the only nations to have swum at all editions of the Cup.

== Editions ==
Edition	Year	Events	Location	Dates	Nations	Best Nation
I	1979	S, D, T	(Japan) Tokyo		8	United States
II	1985	S, D, T	(United States) Indianapolis		3	Canada
III	1987	S, D, T	(Egypt) Cairo		10	United States
IV	1989	S, D, T	(France) Paris	September 7-9	10	United States
V	1991	S, D, T	(Germany) Bonn	September 12-15	10	United States
VI	1993	S, D, T	(Switzerland) Lausanne	July 7-10	11	United States
VII	1995	S, D, T	(United States) Atlanta	August 1-5	9	United States
VIII	1997	S, D, T	(China) Guangdong	July 16-19	13	Russia
IX	1999	S, D, T	(South Korea) Seoul	September 8-12	12	Russia
X	2002	S, D, T	(Switzerland) Zurich	September 12-15	12	Russia
XI	2006	S, D, T, FC	(Japan) Yokohama	September 14-17	29	Russia
XII	2010	S, D, T, FC	(China) Changshu	September 16-19	23	China
XIII	2014	D, T, FC, TH	(Canada) Quebec	October 2–5	17	China

Event codes: S= Solo, D= Duet, T= Team, FC= Free Combination, TH= Team Highlights
