= Merlino (surname) =

Merlino is a surname of Italian origin with several meanings. It may either be from the Arthurian personal name Merlino, borrowed from French Merlin, a diminutive of Merlo, which means 'blackbird', or a habitational name from Merlino, Lombardy.

Notable people with the surname include:

- Chuckie Merlino (1939–2012), American mobster
- Doug Merlino, American writer and journalist
- Francesco Saverio Merlino (1856–1930), Italian lawyer, anarchist and theorist
- Gabriel Merlino (born 1977), Argentine bandoneon player
- Gene Merlino (1928–2024), American singer and musician
- James Merlino (born 1972), Australian politician
- Joey Merlino (born 1962), American mobster
- Joseph P. Merlino (1922–1998), American politician
- Kristen Merlino, American art director
- Lorenzo Merlino (born 1972), Brazilian fashion designer
- Mario Merlino (1944–2026), Italian neo-fascist activist and historian
- Mauro Merlino (born 1969), Italian social and political activist
- Maxine Merlino (1912–2013), American illustrator, muralist and arts educator
- Nell Merlino, American social entrepreneur and author
- Tim Merlino, American politician
