= Debbie Muir =

Canadian synchronized swimmer and coach (born 1953)

Personal information
- Born: Deborah Humphrey; June 12, 1953 (age 73) Calgary, Alberta, Canada
- Education: University of Calgary
- Occupation: Coach
- Years active: 1965–present
- Spouse: Neil Muir (m. 1975)

Sport
- Sport: Synchronized swimming
- University team: Calgary Aquabelles
Medal record
Synchronized swimming
Representing Canada
World Aquatics Championships
Silver medal – second place	1973 Belgrade	Team
Pan American Games
Silver medal – second place	1971 Cali	Team

Deborah Muir (née Humphrey; born June 12, 1953) is a Canadian former synchronized swimmer and coach. She began her career with the Calgary Aquabelles club in 1965 and won silver medals in the synchronized swimming team competitions at both the 1971 Pan American Games and the 1973 World Aquatics Championships. At age 20, Muir retired from competition and began a career in coaching. She coached swimmers of the Calgary Aquabelles to 22 national titles over a decade. She also helped athletes clinch medals in the World Aquatics Championships, the FINA Cup, the Commonwealth Games, the Pan American Games and the Summer Olympic Games. Muir has won various awards for her coaching career, and is an inductee of the Alberta Sports Hall of Fame, the Canadian Olympic Hall of Fame, Canada's Sports Hall of Fame and the International Swimming Hall of Fame.

== Personal background ==
On June 12, 1953, Deborah Muir was born in Calgary, Alberta. She is a graduate of Viscount Bennett High School, and worked for a Bachelor of Education degree from the University of Calgary. In 1975, Muir married English-born water polo player and stockbroker Neil Muir in Calgary.

== Career ==
She joined the Calgary Aquabelles synchronized swimming club to begin her career in the sport in 1965 at age 11. Two years later, Muir won the bronze medal in the junior solo category at the Canadian Championships. She competed in the 1971 Pan American Games in Colombia, claiming the silver medal in the synchronized swimming team competition as a member of Canada's seven-athlete squad for the event. She was named to the Canadian delegation for the 1973 World Aquatics Championships in Yugoslavia, winning the silver medal in the synchronised swimming discipline as a member of the Canadian team. Following the Championships, Muir decided to retire from competition at age 20, saying that she realized she would have not been able to attain the success she desired even after practising hard.

In 1974, she began coaching the Calgary Aquabelles' senior "B" side before going on to coach the "A" team, replacing the unwell Marianne Reeves. Muir coached the club for ten years, seeing its swimmers claim a total of 22 national titles. Muir began coaching the Canadian national team in 1976. The following year, she coached Helen Vanderburg and Michelle Calkins to victory over the United States and Japan at the 1977 Pan Pacific Championships. Muir's first international victory as a coach came at the 1978 World Aquatics Championships in Berlin when Vanderberg claimed the gold medal in the solo competition and Vanderburg and Calkins paired up to win the duet discipline. In 1979, swimmers coached by Muir won medals at that year's FINA Cup in the solo and duet events and at the Pan-American Games.

Muir attained further success as a coach at the 1982 Commonwealth Games with a gold medal for Cameron Henning, and at the 1982 World Aquatics Championships in Guayaquil when Sharon Hambrook and Kelly Kryczka won the gold medal in the duet routine. Her squad won the 1983 Pan American Games gold medal in the team competition. After synchronized swimming became an Olympic sport in 1984, her swimmers Hambrook and Kryczka claimed the silver medal in the duet routine as Carolyn Waldo finished second in the solo event at the 1984 Summer Olympics in Los Angeles. During 1986, Muir stopped coaching the Calgary Aquabelles to focus on the Canadian national team. Her athletes achieved two gold medals in the duet and solo competitions at each of that year's Commonwealth Games and the World Aquatics Championships in Madrid. In 1987, she attained further success when her swimmers took gold medals in each of solo and duet routines at the 1987 FINA Cup.

At the 1988 Summer Olympics in Seoul, Muir guided Waldo to the gold medal of the solo event and Waldo and Michelle Cameron to victory in the duet competition. In 1990, she helped Canadian athletes to win both the duet and solo competitions at the 1990 Commonwealth Games. In the same year, Muir wrote a letter to Synchro Canada expressing concern that synchronized swimming would be excluded from the Olympic program. She stopped coaching the Canadian national team in 1991. At the 1992 Summer Olympics in Barcelona, she helped to employ her underwater synchro abilities to enable Mark Tewksbury's gold medal win in the 100 meter backstroke. Muir consulted several coaches and teams in Egypt, England, Japan, South Korea and Sweden, before going on to coach the Australian national side from 1995 to 2000 full and part time as they prepared for the 2000 Olympic Games in Sydney. She commuted twice a year to Melbourne to train the team and also had them based in Calgary twice each year.

In 2004, Muir was appointed to head Swimming Canada's technical review to take actions to get better at the 2008 Beijing Summer Olympics following the nation's sub-par performances at the 2004 Athens Olympic Games. She was a mentor coach for the Canadian Olympic Committee at the 2008 and 2010 Olympics. Muir was a high performance advisor for the sports of cycling, diving, gymnastics, rowing, swimming, trampoline, and triathlon. She mentored speed skating, synchronized swimming and water polo coaches and completed performances debriefs and evaluation that she led for Athletics Canada, Swimming Canada and Triathlon Canada. Muir is a member on the board of directors of the Canadian Centre for Ethics in Sport and is a graduate of the Royal Roads University's Executive Coaching program. She and Dewsbury co-authored the 2008 book The Great Traits of Champions: Fundamentals for Achievers, Leaders and Legacy Leavers. Muir runs the Performance Training and Development corporate and executive training company, providing senior managers with the required skills to assist their employees get more efficient.

== Accolades ==
In 1975, she was named the recipient of the Suzanne Eon Trophy from Synchro Canada as the "most promising coach". Muir won the 1984 and 1988 YMCA Women in Distinction Award for Sport. She is a three-time winner of the Coaching Excellence Award from the Coaching Association of Canada in 1986, 1988 and 1991. Muir was named the Canadian Amateur Sports Coach of the Year in both 1987 and 1989. In 1989, she was named the Alberta Female Amateur Coach of the Decade for the 1980s for her "success and outstanding commitment to coaching". She was inducted into the Alberta Sports Hall of Fame in April 1994, the builder's category of Canada's Sports Hall of Fame in May 1995, the Canadian Olympic Hall of Fame in April 1998, and the International Swimming Hall of Fame in 2007.
