= FINA World Cup =

FINA World Cup might refer to:

- FINA Swimming World Cup
- FINA Diving World Cup
- FINA Synchronised Swimming World Cup
- FINA Water Polo World Cup
