= Charlie Sava =

American swimming coach

- Sava at age 65, 1966

Biographical details
- Born: June 10, 1900; Balearic Islands
- Died: May 1, 1983 (aged 82); San Francisco, California, U.S.

Playing career
- 1920-: Dolphin Swim Club; San Francisco
- Positions: freestyle, distance

Coaching career (HC unless noted)
- 1928-1955: Crystal Plunge Swim Club
- 1955-1983: Trained at Larson Pool

Accomplishments and honors

Championships
- 10 AAU National Championships 1944-8 (Crystal Plunge SC Women)

Awards
- International Swimming Hall of Fame; Bay Area Sports Hall of Fame

Charles Sava (June 6, 1910 – May 1, 1983) was a Hall of Fame American swimming coach, who led the women's team of San Francisco's Crystal Plunge Swim Club to 10 consecutive National AAU championships between 1944-1948. Sava's best known Olympic swimmers included 1948 two-time gold medalist Ann Curtis Cuneo, 1948 London Olympic diver Vicki Draves, 1948 London Olympic backstroker Barbara Jensen, 1968 Mexico City Olympic Silver medalist Lynn Vidali, and 1952 Helsinki Olympic freestyler Delia Meulenkamp Dooly. 1964 Tokyo Gold Medalist Donna de Varona, and 1972 Munich Olympic gold medalist Mark Spitz did some training with Sava, but also received essential training from Coach George Haines at the Santa Clara Swim Club.

== Early life ==
Sava was born on June 10, 1900 to Portuguese parents, in the Western Mediterranean's Balearic Islands off the coast of Spain. The family emigrated to Brooklyn, New York when he was three. Legend has it that he began swimming when he fell into Long Island Sound as a youngster, and enjoyed the experience of swimming. His birth date is taken from his last known driver's license and San Francisco city records, though he was highly secretive about his age, and some sources quote other dates. Sava swam for San Francisco's Dolphin Swim Club and held several records for swimming across San Francisco Bay.

Around the age of 25 in 1925, Sava was a student at the inaugural Red Cross Aquatic School under fabled instructor Commodore Wilbert Longfellow, superintendent of the U.S. Volunteer Life Saving Corps.

== Swim coaching ==
Sava worked as a swimming and physical education instructor while in the Army in France, and at San Francisco's Presidio at the Southern end of Golden Gate Bridge.

In his early career, Sava worked with Hall of Famer Beth Kaufman, a renowned swim coach and public safety official, to address the problems with early age group swimming and created rules and policies that have stood the test of time with little need for change. Kaufman gained recognition for being the major force in starting the Amateur Athletic Union's age-group swimming program, which would train most of America's future Olympians in the 50's and 60's, and continue for decades in that role. It was a long and difficult process gaining approval for the age-group program in 1951, but Sava was instrumental in the process and worked closely with Kaufman.

An accomplished athlete himself, Sava is reputed to have swum daily for up to an hour in San Francisco Bay for 30 years.

=== Crystal plunge swim club ===
A full-time swim instructor at San Francisco's Crystal Plunge Swimming pool by 1928, Sava led the Crystal Plunge Swim Club women's team to 10 consecutive National AAU championships for four consecutive years between 1944-1948. Originally founded as a salt water pool known as the Crystal Palace in 1924, the Crystal Plunge featured a very wide 50-yard pool at Lombard and Taylor Streets in downtown San Francisco.

Sava continued coaching at the indoor Crystal Plunge Pool on Lombard in downtown San Francisco until it was demolished in 1958. In the late 1940's, future Hall of Famer Coach George Haines, who was then serving at the military base in Alameda, was a frequent visitor to the Crystal Plunge pool while Sava was training Ann Curtis for the 1948 Olympics. For much of its use, the Crystal Plunge pool was large but not luxurious, in a basement, had mechanical issues, sometimes lacked warm water and featured the occasional cockroach. During his peak period between 1944-1948, Coach Sava’s women's teams just over 40 individual national titles. Coach Sava’s single greatest swimmer, Ann Curtis, won 35 National Championship gold medals.

=== Move to Larson pool ===
Around 1955, when the Crystal Plunge was closing, Sava made the welcome move to the indoor Larson Pool at 19th and Wawona in San Francisco, where he could coach year round, though the pool was only 33 yards in length. He coached Ann Curtis at a pool on San Francisco's Treasure Island around 1944, and several of his swimmers also swam at the Fairmont Swim Club's pool at the Fairmont Hotel, though he did not coach there. After 1980, he coached at the remodeled Larkin Park Charlie Sava Pool named in his honor.

=== Technique ===
Sava was one of the earlier coaches to use repetitive intervals and resistance training with his swimmers beginning around 1949. Intervals, also known as sets, had swimmers perform a swim or a series of swims in a set time period, and served to drop swimmer's times and improve cardiovascular efficiency. He pioneered a more relaxed freestyle flutter kick from the knee to the hip, improving speed, and efficiency. He was aware that the legs should be kept straight with the proper degree of bend in the knees, and should move straight up and down with the hips as the source of motion. Sava was described, by his best known swimmer Ann Curtis Cuneo as both a brilliant innovator who implemented modern coaching methods. Cuneo also described him as a tough coach and taskmaster who expected strict compliance with his instruction, but such traits were common in early 20th century championship coaches. 1968 and 1972 Women's U.S. Olympic Swimming and Diving Team Head Coach Sherm Chavoor, in his early years as a coach, claimed he studied fellow Californian Charlie Sava's training techniques and was known as a demanding instructor himself.

=== Outstanding swimmers ===
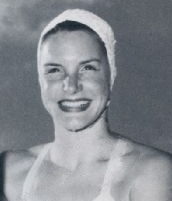
Olympic medalist Ann Curtis in April 1948

Several sources site 50,000 as the number of swimmers Sava trained or taught to swim during his fifty year career. Outstanding swimmers included Hall of Fame Filipino diver Vicki Draves, a 1948 dual gold medalist in springboard and platform diving. His best known swimmer was likely Hall of Famer Ann Curtis Cuneo, who worked with Sava for eight years. Curtis Cuneo was a two-time 1948 London Olympic gold medalist, who began working with Sava at the age of 14, and captured over 30 National Championship titles. In an interview, Cuneo claimed she typically trained with Sava five hours a day with two workout sessions, usually every day. Others who he coached at some point in their career include 1964 Tokyo Gold Medalist Donna de Varona, 1972 Gold Medalist Mark Spitz, backstroker and San Francisco native Marion Pontacq, 1948 London Olympic backstroker Barbara Jensen, Joyce McCrae, 1968 Silver medalist Lynn Vidali, 1952 Helsinki Olympic freestyler Delia Meulenkamp Dooly, and Joan Mallory. Pontaq was a member of the 1940 U.S. Olympic team, and a 1949 National backstroke champion. Sava coached swimming to Hall of Fame Coach Marion Olson Kane Elston, founder of the San Francisco Merionettes sychronized swimming Club, and one of America's most successful coaches in synchronized swimming.

Sava also provided some training to San Francisco native Brenda Helser, and Portland swimmers Nancy Merki, and Suzanne Zimmerman, though the trio did most of their training at the Multinomah Club in Portland, Oregon.

In 1960, Sava he authored the book How to Teach Yourself and Your Family to Swim Well, published by New York's Simon and Schuster.

=== Death ===
On February 16, 1983, Sava was driving to the Larson Park Charlie Sava Swimming Pool in San Francisco named in his honor, to begin daily swim practice at 6:00 am when his car hit a light pole on Holloway Avenue and he was sped to the Mission Emergency Hospital. The officer who reported the accident state Sava wanted to get to the pool and begin practice rather than be taken to a hospital. His injuries were reported as a broken arm, and possibly nose, and though his injuries should have been survivable, he suffered a fatal heart attack at the hospital. Sava was never married and had no children or known survivors. A memorial service was scheduled, but no funeral was planned at Sava's request.

=== Honors ===
He became a member of the Bay Area Sports Hall of Fame in 1983, and was a member of the International Swimming Hall of Fame. The Charlie Sava Larson Park Swimming Pool on San Francisco's 19th Avenue and Wawona Street, where Sava coached from the 1950's until his death in 1983, was named in his honor in 1981. It was remodeled in 2009, and is a modern indoor 8-lane 25-yard swimming facility which can be used for swimming laps, recreation or competition. It maximizes the use of lighting with a large window which takes up most of the South wall, and includes parking, artwork on the tile on one wall, and community rooms.
