= Synchronised swimming at the 1973 World Aquatics Championships – Team routine =

Synchronised swimming – Team routine at the 1973 World Aquatics Championships
- Venue: Tašmajdan Sports and Recreation Center
- Location: Belgrade, Yugoslavia
- Dates: 4 September
- Competitors: 18 from 9 nations
- Winning points: 117.6170

Medalists
gold medal	Teresa Andersen; Susan Barros; Robin Curren; Jackie Douglas; Gail Johnson; Dana Moore; Amanda Norrish; Suzanne Randell	United States
silver medal	Michelle Calkins; Frances Hambrook; Debbie Humphrey; Lorraine Nicholl; Gail Page; Carol Stuart; Susan Thomas; Laura Wilkin	Canada
bronze medal	Masako Fujiwara; Yasuko Fujiwara; Junko Hasumi; Yasuko Unesaki — — — —	Japan

The team routine competition at the 1973 World Aquatics Championships was held on 4 September 1973.

== Results ==
Green denotes finalists

Rank	Nation	Preliminary		Final	
Rank	Nation	Points	Rank	Points	Rank
1st place, gold medalist(s)	United States	117.1170	1	117.6170	1
2nd place, silver medalist(s)	Canada	112.4180	2	112.9180	2
3rd place, bronze medalist(s)	Japan	106.8110	3	107.3110	3
4	Mexico	96.3080	5	98.3080	4
5	Great Britain	96.4180	4	97.9180	5
6	Netherlands	95.6450	6	96.6450	6
7	West Germany	92.3150	7	did not advance	
8	France	91.4580	8	did not advance	
9	Switzerland	87.7110	9	did not advance	
10	Denmark	78.1470	10	did not advance	
11	Norway	77.9470	11	did not advance	
