= Heidi O'Rourke =

American synchronized swimmer

Sport
- Sport: Synchronized swimming
Medal record
Representing United States
Pan American Games
Gold medal – first place	1971 Cali	Solo
Gold medal – first place	1971 Cali	Duet
Gold medal – first place	1971 Cali	Team

Heidi O'Rourke is a retired American synchronized swimming competitor, who won 10 national titles between 1969 and 1971. In 1971, she received the perfect score of 10 at the U.S. Indoor and Outdoor championships (becoming the only athlete to do so in a national AAU Championship) and at the 1971 Pan American Games, where she won three gold medals. After retiring in 1971, she toured Europe with demonstration events and coached the national teams of Switzerland, Spain, and Austria. She also portrayed Eleanor Holm in the 1975 musical film Funny Lady.

In 1980, she was inducted into the International Swimming Hall of Fame.

== See also ==
- List of members of the International Swimming Hall of Fame
