= Lynn Vidali =

American swimmer (born 1952)

Personal information
- Full name: Lynn Marie Vidali -Gautschi
- National team: United States
- Born: May 26, 1952 (age 74) San Francisco, California, U.S.
- Occupation(s): High School Teacher, swim coach
- Height: 5 ft 7 in (1.70 m)
- Weight: 141 lb (64 kg)
- Children: 2

Sport
- Sport: Swimming
- Event: 200, 400 Meter Individual Medley
- Strokes: Breaststroke, Individual Medley
- Club: San Francisco Recreational Park Club; Santa Clara Swim Club
- College team: San Jose State University
- Coach: Charlie Sava, (San Francisco Club); George Haines (Santa Clara SC)
Medal record
Women's swimming
Representing the United States
Olympic Games
Silver medal – second place	1968 Mexico City	400 m medley
Bronze medal – third place	1972 Munich	200 m medley

Lynn Marie Vidali (born May 26, 1952), also known by her married name Lynn Gautschi, is an American former competition swimmer, who competed for San Jose State University, a two-time Olympic medalist, and a former world record-holder in the 200-meter individual medley. After receiving a degree in Kinesiology and teaching certificate from San Jose State in 1977, she had a 34 year career as a High School physical education teacher and swim coach in Southern California.

== Early life and swimming ==
Vidali was born May 26, 1952, in San Francisco, to father Alfred and mother Betty L. Vidali. Of Italian heritage, Lynn's father Alfred worked for the Pacific Telephone Company for 39 years. Swimming by the age of six, Vidali was a member of the synchronized swim club, the San Francisco Merrionettes through the age of nine, where she likely trained in swimming as well. By 12, she received training for competition from San Francisco's Hall of Fame Coach Charlie Sava at the San Francisco Recreational Park Club at Larsen Pool, where training could be provided year round. The Larson pool is now named for Sava. She qualified as a trial finalist for the Junior Olympics in the 200-meter Individual Medley in May, 1964.

At 15, Vidali left San Francisco to train with Hall of Fame Coach George Haines at the renowned Santa Clara Swim Club, around 45 miles South of her native San Francisco. She began attending Santa Clara High School and rented a room with a swimming family in Santa Clara. With the highly competitive Santa Clara Club, she soon averaged four hours of training a day.

== 200-meter IM world record ==
In July 1966 at San Francisco's Far Western Swim Meet, while swimming for Coach Charlie Sava of the San Francisco Recreational Park Club at only 14, she set a 200 metre Individual Medley world record of 2:29. In the same Far Western Meet in San Francisco, she won the 100-meter butterfly with a time of 1:08.4, and won the 400-meter Individual Medley with a time of 5:20. During her High School swimming career in 1969-70, and in 1972 she earned AAU outdoor titles in the 200 Individual Medley. During the same years, she also won the 200 yard Individual Medley indoor title.

In the winter of 1968, prior to that year's Olympic trials, Vidali's training was interrupted while she recovered from a case of mononucleosis, though she soon returned to vigorous training.

== Olympics ==
=== 1968 Mexico City ===
In the 1968 Olympic trials in Los Angeles, Vidali finished third in the finals of the 400 Individual Medley behind the Arden Hill's Club Debbie Meyer and Susan Pederson, qualifying Lynn for the U.S. Women's Olympic team. The U.S. team trained for altitude adjustment and conditioning in Colorado Springs, Colorado, before heading to Mexico City. The 1968 women's U.S. Olympic team was coached by Sherm Chavoor of the Arden Hill's Swim Club in Sacramento.

As a 16-year-old Santa Clara high school student, Vidali represented the United States at the 1968 Summer Olympics in Mexico City. She received a silver medal for her second-place performance in the women's 400-meter individual medley (5:22.2), finishing well behind U.S. teammate Claudia Kolb (5:08.5).

Around 1970-71, Vidali took a brief hiatus from training, working for the phone company, and serving as a life guard at the Los Gatos Swim and Racquet Club. Returning to her training, she began to average 10-15,000 meters daily, and qualified for the U.S. Women's Olympic team at the trials in Chicago.

=== 1972 Munich ===
In a noteworthy triumph on August 2, Vidali won the 1972 Olympic trials finals for the 200-meter Individual medley in Chicago, Illinois, with Carolyn Woods taking second and Jenny Bartz taking third.

Vidali won a bronze medal in the women's 200-meter individual medley at the 1972 Summer Olympics in Munich, Germany swimming a 2:24.06 and finishing behind Australian Shane Gould and East German Kornelia Ender. Vidali went out strong and swam behind gold medalist Shane Gould who would set a blistering world record time of 2:23.07. Weakening from Gould's early speed, Vidali fell behind on the final lap where she was passed by 13-year-old East German Kornelia Ender, who would take silver.

In Munich, she also competed in the 400-meter individual medley placing 7th, and the 100-meter breaststroke, where she tied for 21st place.

Later, in recognition of her Olympic achievements, Vidali was on the reviewing stand with celebrities that included San Francisco Mayor Joseph Alioto for the October, 1972 San Francisco Columbus Day parade.

=== San Jose State swimmer ===
After graduating Santa Clara High School, Vidali initially attended West Valley College but transferred to San Jose State University on one of the first women's athletic scholarships. At San Jose State, she never lost a regular season intercollegiate race, and won both 1975 and 1976 Association for Intercollegiate Athletics for Women (AIAW) titles in the 100-yard Individual Medley. In her first collegiate era 100-yard title in March 1975 in Tempe, Arizona, she won the 100-yard Individual Medley at the AIAW National Championships with a time of 1:00.80. At the same 1975 AIAW championship, Vidali placed second in the 50-yard breaststroke with a time of 31.15.

In March 1976, at the National Swimming Hall of Fame Pool in Fort Lauderdale, Florida, Vidali won her second 100-yard Individual Medley AIAW National title with a time of 1:00.1, a new AIAW record. Vidali graduated San Jose State in 1976, with a major in Kinesiology, and earned teaching credentials from the school in 1977.

=== Post swimming careers ===
After graduating San Jose State and earning her teaching credentials, Vidali Gautschi worked as a High School swim coach and physical education teacher for 34 years. After leaving High School coaching, she began giving private swim lessons. In July 1984, she taught at Live Oak High School in Morgan Hill, about 20 miles South of her alma mater San Jose State. Prior to the 1984 Olympics, she served as a torch carrier, jogging through her short route while playing a small part in carrying the Olympic torch to the site of the 1984 Los Angeles Olympics. The 8700 mile route went through 33 states. Vidali's two children both competed in swimming and water polo, and both spent time as swim coaches.

=== Honors ===
Vidali Gautschi would become a member of the San Jose State Sports Hall of Fame. In 2015, she was admitted to the Live Oak High School Hall of Fame for her service as a Coach.

== See also ==
- List of Olympic medalists in swimming (women)
- List of San Jose State University people
- World record progression 200 metres individual medley
- World record progression 4 × 100 metres medley relay

Records
Preceded by Donna de Varona	Women's 200-meter individual medley world record-holder July 22, 1966 – August 21, 1966	Succeeded by Claudia Kolb
