= Delia Meulenkamp =

American swimmer (1933–2013)

Deliana Meulenkamp
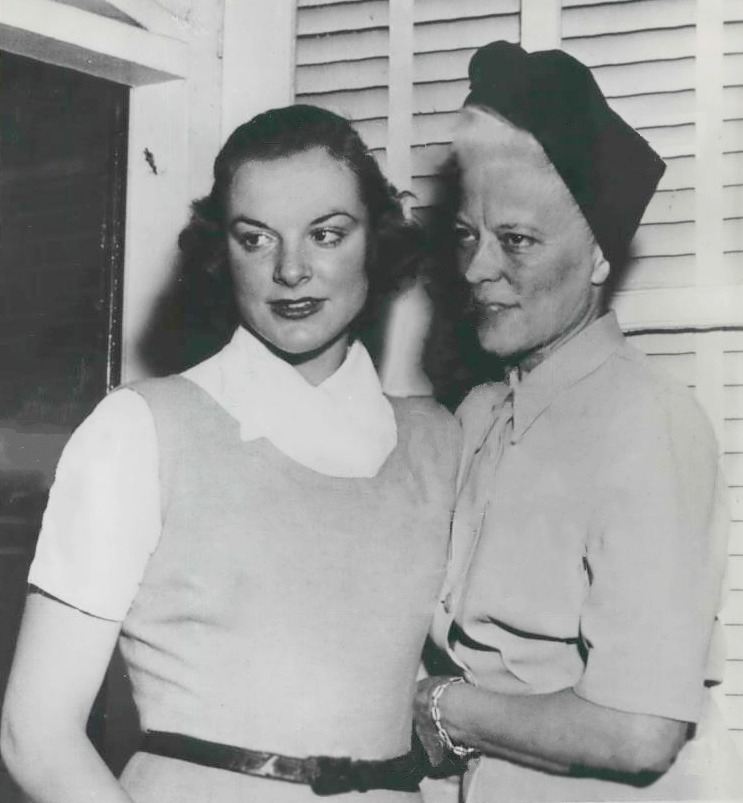
- Meulenkamp on left with mother Maria in 1952

Personal information
- Full name: Deliana Meulenkamp
- Nickname: "Delia"
- National team: United States
- Born: July 3, 1933 Rotterdam, Netherlands
- Died: March 13, 2013 (aged 79) San Francisco, California, U.S.
- Height: 5 ft 9 in (1.75 m) (At 16, Sept, 1949)
- Spouse: Jack Dooling (m. 1961)
- Children: 2

Sport
- Sport: Swimming
- Strokes: breaststroke Freestyle
- Club: Crystal Plunge Swim Club; San Francisco
- Coach: Charlie Sava (Crystal Plunge)

Deliana Meulenkamp (July 3, 1933 in Rotterdam, Netherlands – March 13, 2013 in San Francisco, California), also known by her married name Delia Dooling, after April 1961, was a Dutch-born American competition swimmer who represented the United States at the 1952 Summer Olympics in Helsinki, Finland, placing twelfth in the 400-meter freestyle. After retiring from swimming around 1953, she would marry in April 1961, raise two children, work for California-based Pacific Southwest Airlines, and serve as the athletic director of San Francisco's Metropolitan Club.

== Early life ==
Meulenkamp was born in Rotterdam, Netherlands on July 3, 1933, to Gerrit Wilhelmus Antonius and Maria Cornelia Meulenkamp, and had a brother Jack. She grew up during the German occupation of Holland which began in May 1940 with heavy aerial bombing of her native Rotterdam and ended in 1945. Though second in size to the Capital Amsterdam, coastal Rotterdam had one of the largest ports in the world in 1940, of significance to her father's business. She swam and competed briefly in Holland, before coming to America after the War with her family in late 1948. A successful import-export broker, Gerrit Meulenkamp, aware of Delia's potential as an athlete, was largely influenced in his decision to transfer his company to San Francisco, so Delia could be coached by Sava whose Crystal Plunge swimmers had experienced great success at the 1948 Olympics. According to one source, Valejo California's Times Herald, the decision came after a meeting between Sava and Gerrit Meulenkamp at the 1948 London Olympics. By 1949, Delia was swimming with the Crystal Plunge Swimming Club in greater San Francisco under Hall of Fame Coach Charlie Sava. Once in the San Francisco area, she attended Mill Valley's Tamalpais High School, and swam for their swim team for a year. She graduated Tamalpais High on June 17, 1951, as a resident of Mill Valley.

A triple winner at the Stockton-Record Swim meet in late May 1951, Meulenkamp won the 50-meter freestyle in a time of 52.7, the 100-meter breaststroke in a time of 1:37.0, and the 200-meter freestyle in a time of 2:40.8. She won the 100-meter freestyle in a time of 1:04.9 at the Fleishacker Pool at the San Francisco Recreation Department meet on May 20, 1951

By June 1952, Delia was rated as one of the greatest 800-meter swimmers in the world. She initially specialized in breaststroke before coming to America, but switched to freestyle by 1950 under the direction of Coach Sava, and soon set American records in both the 300 and 400-yard freestyle. Swimming at Stanford University, she set a world record in the 400-yard freestyle of 4:40 in June 1952.

In 1952, prior to the Helsinki Olympics, at the request of the U.S. Olympic Committee and with the work of U.S. House Representative Harold B. Scutter of Marin, California, Meulenkamp was the beneficiary of a special act of the U.S. Congress that created a bill to speed her approval as a citizen. House Bill HR6117, known as Delia's Bill, which was initially passed by the House in March 1952, was subsequently passed by the Senate after some delay. It was promptly signed on June 28, 1952, by President Truman granting Meulenkamp American citizenship and allowing her to compete in the U.S. Olympic trials in Indianapolis on July 2–4, 1952 and later in the Helsinki Olympics beginning in late July. Her father Gerit had received citizenship one month earlier in May, 1952.

== 1952 Helsinki Olympics ==
At the early July, 1952 Olympic trials in Indianapolis, Indiana, Meulenkamp placed third in the 400-meter freestyle behind 18-year old Hawaiian Evelyn Kawamoto, who took first with an American record time of 5:14.6, and Carolyn Green, of the Fort Lauderdale Swim Association who placed second with a 5:20.0. Meulenkamp had become an official American citizen only eight days earlier, and had been given the oath of citizenship by Superior Court Judge Jordan Martinelli. Former 400-meter record holder Kawamoto overtook Green after the first 100 meters. With a surge of speed in the last 25 meters of her close finish, Meulenkamp overtook Ann Moss of the Lafayette Swim Club, and placed third with a time of 5:24.5, finishing ten seconds behind Kawamoto, and qualifying for the U.S. women's team. Barbara Hobelman, the American record holder in the 400 that year placed only eighth at the trials and did not make the American team.

At the late July, 1952 Helsinki Olympics after turning 19, Meulenkamp competed in the women's 400-meter freestyle, and advanced to the semifinals. She placed 12th overall, swimming sixth in the second heat of the semi-finals with a time of 5:27.9. Muelenkamp had swum a faster 5:21.4, her best recorded time, in a previous preliminary heat where she placed fourth. According to one source, Delia's semi-final time of 5:27.9, slower than her previous preliminary time, might have been attributable to a slow start and hesitation coming off the starting block.

She became a media sensation at the 1952 Olympics when the good looks of the "copper-haired American swimmer" attracted the attention of newspaper and magazine photographers. She was selected by a group of journalists as the Olympic Beauty Queen, a title previously held by 1948 Olympic freestyle gold medalist Brenda Helser.

Meulenkamp set a total of four American records during her swimming career, setting one in 1950 while still a student at Tamalpais High in the 400-meter breaststroke. In 1953, she set an American record in the 250-yard freestyle.

=== Marriage and careers ===
She later worked for Pacific Southwest Airlines, a regional airline based in San Diego, and served as athletic director of the Metropolitan Club, a large, historic women's club in downtown San Francisco. After a ten-year courtship, at 27, Delia married Jack K. Dooling, 37, a well-known San Francisco attorney in private practice, on the afternoon of Saturday, April 29, 1961, in Carmel at Mission San Carlos Borromeo. The couple planned to live in Woodside, California, about 30 miles South of San Francisco, after a honeymoon in Scottsdale, Arizona. They had two boys, John and Matthew.

=== Honors ===
Meulenkamp was inducted into the Marin County Athletic Hall of Fame around 2018.

She continued to swim recreationally for fitness with some frequently for much of her life, until her health began to decline around 2010. She died in San Francisco at the age of 79 on March 13, 2013, and was buried at Holy Cross Catholic Cemetery in Colma, California. She was predeceased by her husband and parents. A memorial Mass was held at St. Ignatius Church on March 22.
