= Barbara Jensen =

American swimmer (1929–2018)

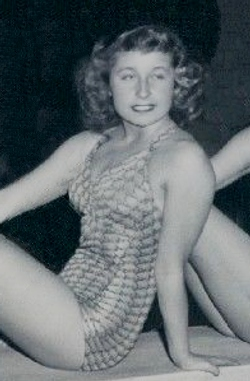
- Jensen in 1946

Personal information
- Full name: Barbara Jayne Jensen
- National team: United States
- Born: September 15, 1929 San Francisco, California, U.S.
- Died: December 20, 2018 (aged 89) Ravalli, Montana, U.S.

Sport
- Sport: Swimming
- Strokes: Backstroke
- Club: Crystal Plunge Swim Club (San Francisco); Athens Athletic Club
- Coach: Charlie Sava (Crystal Plunge)

Barbara Jayne Jensen (later Reeve, later Jackson, September 15, 1929 – December 20, 2018) was an American competition swimmer who represented the United States in the semi-finals of the Women's 100-meter backstroke at the 1948 Summer Olympics in London.

== Early life and education ==
Jensen was born in San Francisco, California and raised in Colma, the daughter of Mattrup Jay Jensen and Edna Quinn Jensen. Her father managed a cemetery in Colma. Her Danish-born grandfather was the first mayor of Colma. She learned to swim at the Jewish Community Center in San Francisco and started competing around the age of 12. She was managed and trained by Hall of Fame Coach Charlie Sava, who coached at the Crystal Plunge swimming club, and at the Larson Pool, both in San Francisco from the late 1920's through 1983. She swam with the Crystal Plunge Club early in her career, then with the Athens Athletic Club in nearby Oakland, California, and returned to the Crystal Plunge Swim club in 1949. Swimming for the Athens Athletic Club at the Metropolitan Oakland Swimming Championships in March 1948, Jensen set a Pacific Association record for the 300-yard individual medley, with a winning time of 4:11.6, and won the 150-yard backstroke, one of her strengths with a time of 1:54.9. At age 44, she earned a master's degree in sociology from Saint Xavier University in Chicago.

== 1948 London Olympics ==
She competed in the semifinals of the 100-meter backstroke at the 1948 London Olympics and finished fifth in the second semifinal heat with a time of 1:19.1, and did not quite make the finals. Her time was tenth overall, and she would have to have finished in the top eight to qualify.

== Swimming career highlights ==
In 1945, aged 15, she broke the national record in the 100 m backstroke.

Jensen was a member of the national team in 1949–50. In 1949 she won the AAU titles in the 110-yard and 220-yard backstroke outdoors, and in the 220-yard backstroke indoors. The same year she was runner-up for the James E. Sullivan Award. and placed fifth in the voting for female Athlete of the Year in the annual Associated Press poll of sports writers.

In the early 1950s, after she married, Barbara Jensen Reeve was a swimmer with the Chicago Town Club. In August, 1973, she swam a 1:29.196 for a 100-meter backstroke event at the National AAU Masters championship at Chicago Circle. In 1972 she began competing in masters swimming. Between 1972 and 1979 she won 42 national titles and set eight national or world records in the backstroke swimming with United States Masters swimming. She semi-retired in 1980 for health reasons, but resumed competing in 1997, winning her national titles in the 50m, 100m, and 200m backstroke. In 1997, her Masters national titles put her in line for the All-American team for Master's swimmers. She was active in the U.S. Masters Swimming organization as a volunteer and attended the 1975 and 1999 national conventions. Much of her Master's swimming in Montana in later life was done at the Canyon Sports Club in Hamilton, Montana, where she also did some coaching. Around 2000, she was a member of the U.S. Master's Fitness Education Committee and also served on the U.S. Master's Sports Medicine and Science Committee.

== Personal life ==
Jensen married twice and had four children and was survived by 13 grandchildren. She survived cancer in the 1980s. She died in 2018, at the age of 89, in Ravalli, Montana.
