= Russ Hafferkamp =

Personal information
- Full name: Russell Hafferkamp
- Citizenship: American
- Born: 1954 (age 71–72) Santa Barbara, California, U.S.
- Home town: Santa Barbara, California, U.S.
- Education: Santa Barbara High School
- Occupations: Athlete; coach; sports researcher

Sport
- Country: United States
- Sport: Water polo
- University team: San Diego State University; UC Santa Barbara
- Coached / Assistant: UC San Diego; Cal Poly San Luis Obispo; UC Berkeley; UC Santa Barbara; The Olympic Club; Tasmania, Australia

Achievements and titles
- World finals: 6 Gold (Masters); 3 Silver (Masters); 15 appearances (Masters)
- National finals: 8 Gold (Open); 26 Gold (Masters)

Russell "Russ" Hafferkamp (born 1954) is an American water polo player, coach, administrator, researcher, and author known for his extensive playing career, leadership in Masters water polo, coaching, and advocacy within the sport.

== Early life and education ==
Hafferkamp grew up in Santa Barbara, California, and began playing water polo in his senior year at Santa Barbara High School.<ref>"Santa Barbara High School Wall of Fame 2023 Inductees".</ref> He played NCAA water polo at San Diego State University (1975) and the University of California, Santa Barbara (UCSB) (1976), earning NCAA All-American honors and the Santa Barbara Athletic Round Table Outstanding Athlete Award.

== Career ==
- NCAA All-American at UCSB and a member of the U.S. National Training Team leading up to the 1980 Olympic Games boycott.
- Represented the United States at the 1977 World University Games in Sofia, Bulgaria.
- Played professionally and was player-coach for the Tasmanian State Men’s Water Polo team in Australia.
- Competed for more than 40 years nationally and internationally, earning 14 Open Division All-American and 29 Masters Division All-American selections.
- Won eight U.S. National Championships in Open Division and 26 Masters Division titles.
- Competed in 15 FINA Masters World Championships, winning six gold and three silver medals; six-time MVP in U.S. National Championships.

== Coaching and leadership ==
- Over 20 years coaching at collegiate and club levels; head coach at UC San Diego and Cal Poly San Luis Obispo; assistant coach for UC Berkeley, UCSB, and The Olympic Club; coaching in Tasmania, Australia.
- Key pioneer and advocate in founding the U.S. national Masters water polo program in 1989, authoring its legislation and funding.
- Served over 12 years in USA Water Polo governance, including the Board of Governors, Board of Directors, Executive Committee, and Chair of the Athletes Committee.
- Advocate for athlete welfare, officiating transitions, and career development after sport.

== Other contributions ==
- Author of CareerBall: The Sport Athletes Play When They're Through Playing Sports, CareerBall Student-Athlete Career Guide, and Water Polo at The Olympic Club: A Century of Excellence.
- Researcher and statistician for NBC Olympics broadcasts since 2000 Sydney Games.
- Holder of multiple patents and entrepreneur in Consumer Package Goods/Grocery trade promotion
- Published children’s book Fuzzy the Virus (2020), addressing COVID-19.

== Honors and recognition ==
- Inducted into International Swimming Hall of Fame (2008, Masters Water Polo Honoree).
- Inducted into USA Water Polo Hall of Fame (2022).
- Inducted into The Olympic Club Hall of Fame (individual and team).
- Inducted into Santa Barbara Athletic Round Table Hall of Fame (2024).
- Inducted into Santa Barbara City College Athletics Hall of Fame (2024).
- Inducted into Santa Barbara High School Wall of Fame (2023).
- Winner of the 2024–2025 Sports Emmy® Award for Outstanding Live Special – Championship Event as part of NBC/Peacock’s research team at the Games of the XXXIII Olympiad (Paris 2024).

== Personal life ==
Hafferkamp resides in the San Francisco Bay Area and continues active engagement in water polo as a player, coach, and advocate.
