= Lorenzo Merlino =

Brazilian fashion designer (born 1972)

Lorenzo Merlino (born 1972, in São Paulo, Brazil) is a Brazilian fashion designer.

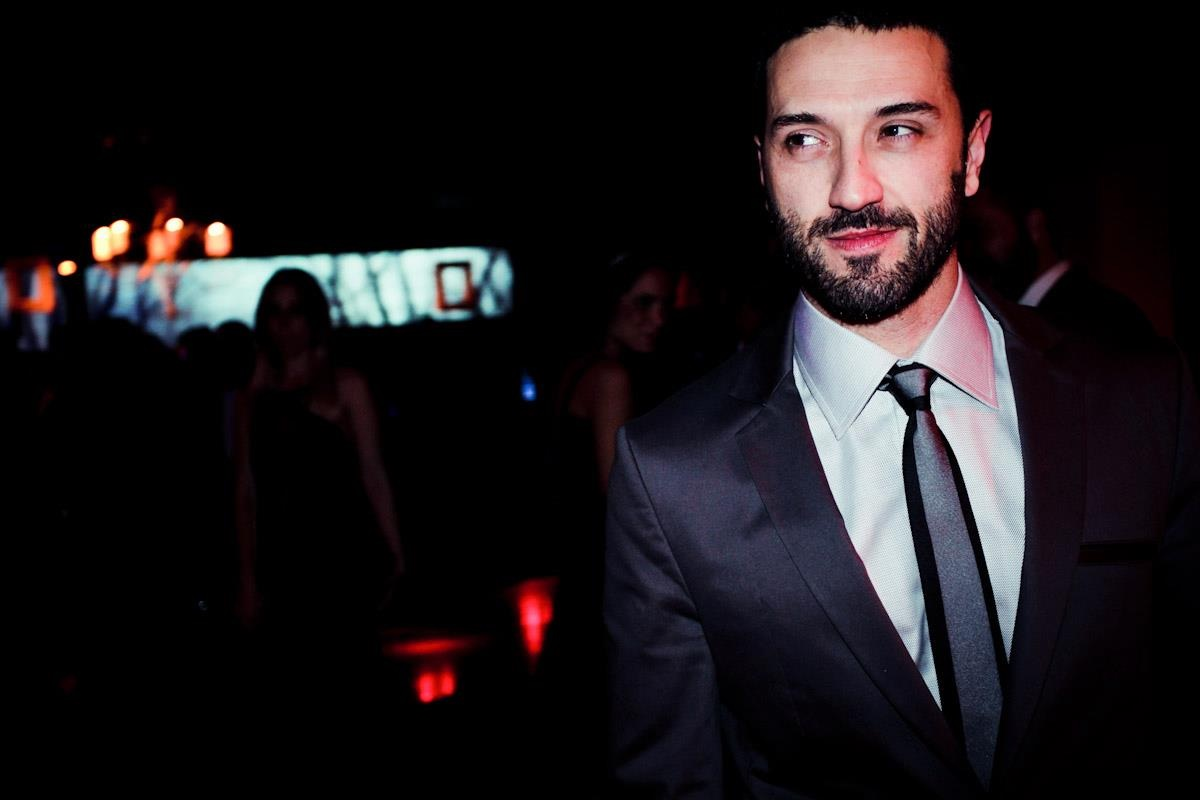
Lorenzo Merlino

== Biography ==
Merlino appeared on the market in the 1990s and later gained the international market as well. He started college at the Faculdade Santa Marcelina in 1991 and finished in 1994 with a collection that was recognized by the press at the time. Before that he went to the finals of the Smirnoff International Fashion Awards contest in 1993. A year after the graduation, he presented his collection in São Paulo Hilton Hotel. In 1995 went to Paris after Marie Rucki, Studio Berçot's director, invited him to study there. When he got back to Brazil, Lorenzo created his trademark that received his own name and with some others young fashion designers started Semana de Moda - Casa de Criadores, where he presented his creations from April 1997 until March 1999.

Merlino choose then to present his collections independently. During that time, Merlino became the first Brazilian fashion designer to be represented in a showroom in Paris, being covered by the international press. Among those publications are The Face, Elle, View on colour, I-D, Tank, Jalouse, Libération, and L'Officiel. The pop star Madonna bought a dress signed by Lorenzo at the time. In 2000, he was the only Brazilian invited by Tencel to participate, with other seven fashion designers, of a fashion show sponsored by the company, that took place during the official New York Fashion Week. The event was called Os Modernistas.

Merlino had a brief return to the Semana de Moda and right after was invited by the commission formed with press members specialized in the fashion area to participate in the São Paulo Fashion Week, the most important Brazilian fashion show, during 2002 summer edition. This was the first year where this special commission was in charge of choosing the new fashion designers that would enter the show. His international career maintained on track during 2003 to 2005 when his creations were present at a New York City showroom called Opening Ceremony. In 2004, the American magazine Index published an article electing the five most prominent young fashion designers of the world and his name was selected.

Inside the Brazilian market, Merlino has licensed a series of products in partnership with some brand names in the local market. With C&A he developed uniforms for the Pinacoteca do Estado de São Paulo's employees and that gave him the opportunity to show his SPFW collection there. He signed during two years a line of bags for Le Postiche, shoes for Vizzano, cellphone accessories for Motorola and a men's collection for Riachuelo. Other brands are Grendene, Speedo, VR São Paulo, Melissa and Diadora.

His academic life includes a graduation in Art History, finished in 2013. He taught Brazilian colleges is in charge of the Fashion Project classes at Fundação Armando Alvares Penteado - FAAP. He also teaches at Escola São Paulo.
