= Michelle Calkins =

Canadian synchronized swimmer

Personal information
- National team: Canada

Sport
- Sport: Swimming
- Strokes: Synchronised swimming
- Club: Calgary Aquabelles
- Coach: Debbie Muir
Medal record
Synchronised swimming
Representing Canada
World Aquatics Championships
Gold medal – first place	1978 West Berlin	Duet
Silver medal – second place	1973 Belgrade	Team
Pan American Games
Silver medal – second place	1975 Mexico City	Team

Michelle Calkins is a former Canadian synchronized swimmer, world champion, and coach.

== Career ==
Calkins trained with the Calgary Aquabelles. In her first international competition, she won a silver medal in the team event at the 1973 World Aquatics Championships in Belgrade, Yugoslavia. She was also a member of the silver medal team at the 1975 Pan American Games. Her most notable successes came with her partner Helen Vanderburg. At the Pan Pacific Championships in Mexico City, the pair won gold for the first time. They won gold again at the Canadian Aquatic Championships in 1978 in Berlin and were the first Canadian duo to earn gold medals in that event. Calkins retired from competition in 1978.

=== Coaching ===
After she retired from her swimming career, Calkins began coaching with the Calgary Aquabelles winning gold with her first team at the Canada Winter Games in Brandon, Manitoba. Michelle coached with the Aquabelle Club winning numerous Junior National team titles and Junior coach of the year 1984; continuing under the guidance of Olympic coach Debbie Muir, Michelle coached the Senior Aquabelle team to three National Championships over the span of her career. She began serving as a coach for the Canadian National Team in synchronized swimming in 1988, winning gold in solo, duet, and team at the Loano Cup in Italy in 1992, and Canada's last silver medal in team at the World Championships in Rome in 1994. Michelle was honoured nationally by the Coaching Association of Canada for her success at the World Championships. Calkins was the personal coach of five Canadian team Olympians: Reed, Fonteyne, Clark, Chan and Tatham. She has since retired from coaching.

== Titles ==
- 1973 Belgrade, Yugoslavia - World Championships - silver in team
- 1975 Mexico City - Pan American Games - silver in team
- 1976 Nagoya Japan - Pan Pacific Championships - silver in team
- 1977 Mexico City - Pan Pacific Championships - gold in duet, silver team
- 1978 Berlin Germany - World Championships - gold in duet

== Honours ==
Calkins and Vanderburg won the Elaine Tanner Award as the best young female athletes in Canada in 1977. They were inducted into the Canadian Swimming Hall of Fame in 1979. Calkins was inducted into the Alberta Sports Hall of Fame in 1980 and became a member of the International Swimming Hall of Fame in 2001.

== See also ==
- List of members of the International Swimming Hall of Fame
