= Synchronized swimming at the 1971 Pan American Games =

- No. of events: 3

Synchronized swimming at the 1971 Pan American Games, held from 30 July to 13 August 1971 in Cali, Colombia. There were three medal events. Synchronized swimming returned as a sport in the Pan Am Games after being skipped in the 1967 edition.

== Medal table ==
Rank	Nation	Gold	Silver	Bronze	Total
1	United States	3	0	0	3
2	Canada	0	3	0	3
3	Mexico	0	0	3	3
Totals (3 entries)		3	3	3	9

== Medalists ==
Event	Gold	Silver	Bronze
Solo	Heidi O'Rourke; United States	Jojo Carrier; Canada	Eva Govezensky; Mexico
Duet	United States (USA); Joan Lang; Heidi O'Rourke	Canada (CAN); Jojo Carrier; Madeleine Ramsay	Mexico (MEX); Eva Govezensky; Malke Govezensky
Team	United States (USA); Cinny Anderson; Barbara Cooney; Chris Jeffers; Kathy Kretschmer; Joan Lang; Amy Miner; Sue Morris; Heidi O'Rourke	Canada (CAN)	Mexico (MEX)
