= Joy Cushman =

American swimmer

Joy Cushman is an American swimmer.

== Biography ==
Cushman was born in Houston, Texas.

Between 1958 and 1963, Cushman was the chair of AAU Synchronized Swimming and, between 1956 and 1975, she was a member of the United States Olympic Committee Board of Directors.

In 2018, Cushman was inducted into the International Swimming Hall of Fame.

== Medals and recognition ==
- FINA Silver Pin
- Lillian MacKellar Distinguished Service Award
- Milby Hall of Fame
