= Émile-Georges Drigny =

French swimmer

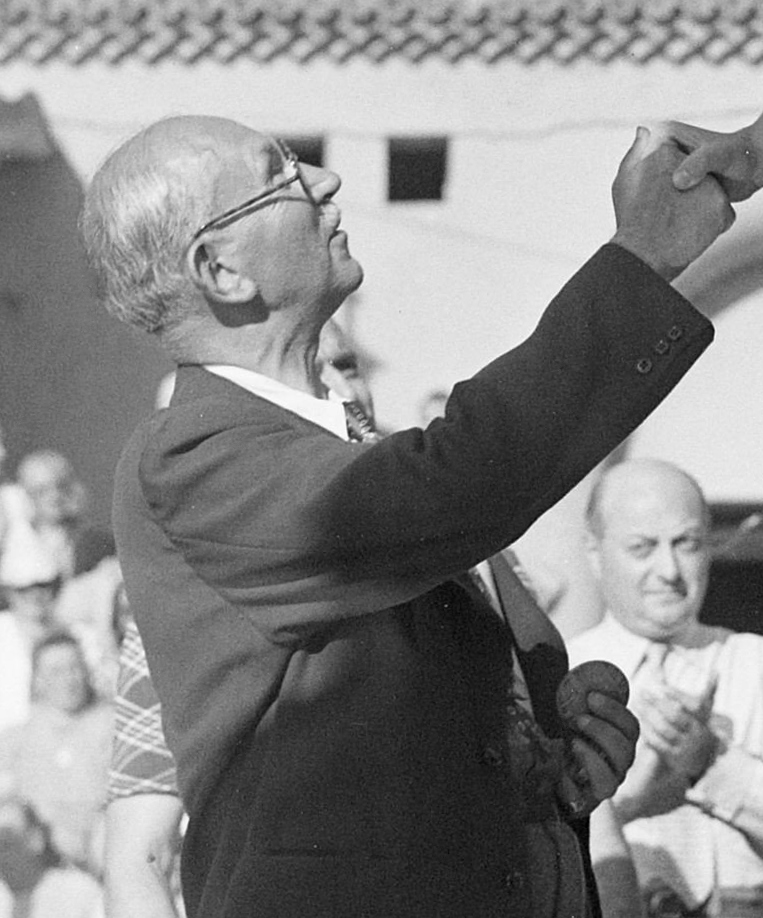
- Drigny at the 1947 European Aquatics Championships in Monaco

Personal information
- Born: 3 July 1883 Melun, France
- Died: 9 July 1957 (aged 74)

Sport
- Sport: Water polo
- Club: SCUF, Paris

Émile-Georges Drigny (3 July 1883 – 9 July 1957) was a French sports official and water polo player, who competed at the 1920 Summer Olympics. He started his career as a sports administrator around 1911, when he became head of the swimming section of the Union des Sociétés Françaises de Sports Athlétiques. He was responsible for the swimming events at the 1924 Summer Olympics, where he also worked as a journalist for L'Intransigeant. In 1926 he co-founded the Ligue Européenne de Natation and was its president in 1938–1948. He was also a member of the International Olympic Committee and president of FINA in 1928–1932 and of the Fédération Française de Natation in 1942–1949. In 1984, he was inducted into the International Swimming Hall of Fame.
