= Stella Taylor =

American long-distance swimmer (1929–2003)

- Born: December 20, 1929; Bristol, England
- Died: February 11, 2003 (aged 73); Fort Lauderdale, Florida, U.S.
- Burial place: Lauderdale Memorial Park
- Occupation: Marathon swimmer
- Known for: Oldest woman to swim English Channel, age 45, 1975 (2nd crossing)
- Height: 165.5 cm (5 ft 5 in)
- Sports career
- Sport: Swimming
- Coach: Robert Duenkel

Stella Taylor (December 20, 1929 – February 11, 2003) was an American long-distance swimmer born in Bristol, England, best known for crossing the English Channel twice and holding Guinness Book of Records recognition (1974 to 1994) as the oldest woman to swim across the Channel. She made her first English channel crossing in August 1973 in 15:25, from England to France, when she was around the age of 43, repeating the swim in 1975 in 18:15 at the age of 45.

== Biography ==
Taylor was born on December 20, 1929, in Bristol, England, to Roy and Kathleen Titus Taylor. According to friends, her relationship with her father provided some insight into her character. Her father Roy Taylor had been a former swimmer and high-diver. She began doing household chores at the age of five. Stella would swim laps while her father Roy practiced diving and was expected to continue until he had finished. He instructed her to swim alongside him when he was boating and would reward her with a piece of candy when she swam well.

=== Training as a nun ===
The first vocation she pursued was as a nun, and she spent four years at Sisters of Mercy Convent in Buffalo, New York, in preparation for a life in the convent, but she never took her final vows. Still, she became known by the nickname "swimming nun." She lived in Buffalo for four years and taught first grade until around 1958.

=== Early swim career ===
In the early 1960s, Taylor moved to Miami and then to Fort Lauderdale, Florida, where she would spend the rest of her life. There she met the first executive director of the International Swimming Hall of Fame, Buck Dawson, where she was active, who convinced her to pursue marathon swimming. Dawson served as executive director from 1964 to 1987. Taylor took up Marathon swimming around the age of 32 around 1962. During the 1970s she trained with the Northeast High School Swim Team, as well as the Fort Lauderdale and Pinecrest Swim Teams.

In 1969, she was given the Greta Andersen Trophy (awarded by the famed Danish swimmer), for being "the outstanding first-year woman swimmer on the World Professional Marathon Swimming Federation circuit." Another marathon swimmer of that time, Diana Nyad, won the same award the following year.

=== Professions outside swimming ===
Professionally, Taylor taught at the Fort Lauderdale Oral School until around 1965, when she began training as a swimmer full time, and working as a pool manager at Coral Ridge Country Club and Nova High School. A blue-eyed blonde, she often had a tan during her training. She would occasionally fill in as a swim coach or instructor, or volunteer or work part-time at Fort Lauderdale's Swimming Hall of Fame.

Taylor died on February 11, 2003, aged 73 in Fort Lauderdale from complications of a brain tumor. She had been hospitalized around six months and had been a resident at Palm Court Convalescent Home in Wilton Manors in Fort Lauderdale. She was buried at Lauderdale Memorial Park. Bob Duenkel, a long-time friend, mentor and coach, who first met her in 1969, and crewed for her on several of her long distance swims, said "She devoted a large part of her life to Marathon Swimming." Deunkel noted that she always had an ability to continue, and would never give up. Deunkel would serve as an executive director and Curator of the International Swimming Hall of Fame in Fort Lauderdale. Taylor never married, and her medical expenses and insurance near the end of her life had drained her savings to the point where her medical bills were not getting paid until a friend successfully took up a collection.

== Selected swims ==
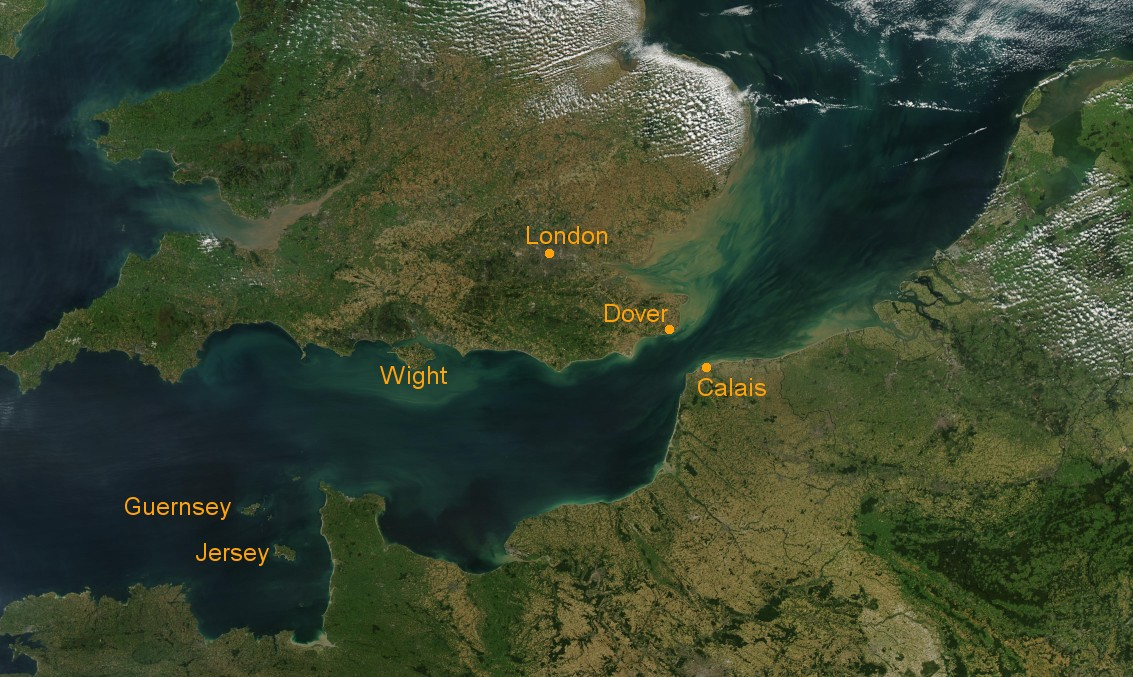
The English Channel, showing France to the south.

Taylor made many notable marathon swims:

- On August 10, 1973, at around 43 years of age, Taylor swam the English Channel southward from England to France in 15 hours, 25 minutes earning her notoriety as the oldest woman to swim across the Channel. She was congratulated by the Queen of England. Ray Scott, Chairman of the Channel Swimmer's Association believed due to tides and current she may have actually swum a total of 45 miles, swimming from Shakespeare Cliff in Dover to Cap Blanc Nez in France. She did the channel again around August 26, 1975, in 18 hours, 15 minutes, experiencing some rough seas.
- On June 11, 1977, Taylor completed the night-time Lake George marathon solo swim in Eastern New York, in 26 hours 51 minutes, making her the oldest person to complete the swim and the fastest, receiving a $2000 prize, while breaking the previous record by 4 hours. The 32-mile (51.5 km) swim commemorates the first lake-crossing swim in 1958 by Diane Struble, a 25-year-old single mother.
- On August 14, 1978, around 48, Taylor made an unsuccessful attempt to swim the Atlantic Ocean from Gun Cay, ten miles South of Bimini of the Western Bahamas to Palm Beach, Florida, but had to stop just a few miles short of her goal when the tides turned against her, and though she aimed for Palm Beach, she had no specific destination in mind when the Gulf Stream affected her course. Sharks circled her in her attempts to complete the approximate 100 mile distance. She was swimming strongly, 70 strokes to the minute, but was repeatedly forced to seek shelter in the boat that was escorting her because of prowling sharks, and according to one source swam for around 32 hours before ending the swim. She attempted that swim a total of four times. Attempting the swim again from Orange Cay in the Western Bimini Islands of the Bahamas around October 4, 1978, she was impeded by current and stinging Portuguese Men-of-war and aborted the swim after 51 hours. She completed around 100 miles from Orange Cay, Bimini, Bahamas to within 20 miles of Hollywood, Florida. In August 1979, ten foot waves forced her to quit after 20 hours. She attempted the swim again at 56 in 1986 for the last time, but was forced to stop from dehydration and a strong Gulf Stream current. In 1979 Diana Nyad completed a swim from North Juno Beach, Florida, to Bimini in the Bahamas, a distance of 102 miles in 27 hours, though she had favorable winds and current, and was only 30.
- On July 7, 1980, at 50, she finished in 25th place around Absecon Island in Atlantic City's 23.5 Mile "Around the Island Swim", completing the race in 7:51:12, and earning $150.00.
- On April 12, 1981, at age 51, she did a 31-mile swim in around 20:11 across Lake Okeechobee from Moore Haven to Belle Glade, Florida, with the water at 54 F.
- On August 22, 1981, at around 51 years of age, Taylor swam the 24 miles across Scotland's Loch Ness in 18 hours, 58 minutes with the fastest woman's time, shattering the 1967 record of Brenda Sheratt of 31.5 hours. After she finished, she said, "Something big touched [my] foot at the start... The water was 45-48°F (7.2-8.8°C)…I had five pounds of grease on to keep warm. Loch Ness is the hardest swim I’ve ever done and I will probably swim the Irish Sea next year.”
- Around April 9, 1982 in Fort Lauderdale around the age of 52, Taylor entered the pool at the International Swimming Hall of Fame on a Tuesday at 10 p.m. She swam laps in the 55-yard pool and remained there swimming until Friday afternoon at 3 p.m. for a total of 65 hours. The swim broke the Guinness Book of World Records for a continuous swim without stopping in a fresh water pool, by around 4 hours. Some sources vary as to the distance she swam, but she completed 3,000 turns or lengths and around 81 miles, according to the Tampa Tribune, Fort Lauderdale News, and the Tallahassee Democrat, which published their story the day after the swim. After the swim, she received a plaque from Fort Lauderdale Mayor Robert Dressler, as a crowd of around 300 watched her finish.
- She completed a 24 Hour swim in Lake Louie or Lac Louis in Quebec, known as 24 Heures La Tuque or the 24 Hour LaTuque Marathon Swim in the area of North Central Quebec, on the St. Maurice. The swim was swum as a non-stop relay and the course was only slightly over 1/3 of a mile allowing fans on shore to cheer on the competitors.
- In April 1971, ranking second in the world among professional women marathon swimmers, she was part of the competition in Egypt, completing seven miles of the Nassar Swim in Aswan around a 14-mile closed loop in 10 hours, taking home a little prize money. Amidst strong current, 10 foot waves and strong winds, she came in fourth place in the Nile Swim, completing the 20 mile course within the 11 hour time limit, though earning only $75.

=== Honors ===
She was a member of the International Marathon Swimming Hall of Fame where she was inducted in 1982 as an honor swimmer. She was once given a key to the city of Fort Lauderdale by the Mayor, and was given a plot of land for burial. A bench in Lauderdale Memorial Park where she was buried on Monday, February 24, 2003, includes her name and swimming achievements.
