= 1993 FINA Synchronised Swimming World Cup =

International synchronised swimming competition

The 6th FINA Synchronised Swimming World Cup was held July 7–10, 1993 in Lausanne, Switzerland. It featured swimmers from 11 nations, swimming in three events: Solo, Duet and Team.

== Participating nations ==
11 nations swam at the 1993 Synchro World Cup:

- Canada
- China
- France
- Great Britain
- Italy
- Japan
- Netherlands
- Russia
- Switzerland
- United States
- Venezuela

== Results ==
| Event | Gold | | Silver | | Bronze | |
|---|---|---|---|---|---|---|
| Solo details | Becky Dyroen-Lancer; United States | 193.459 | Lisa Alexander; Canada | 190.747 | Olga Sedakova; Russia | 190.434 |
| Duet details | Jill Sudduth; Becky Dyroen-Lancer; United States | 191.987 | Olga Sedakova; Anna Kozlova; Russia | 190.394 | Cari Read; Karen Fonteyne; Canada | 189.768 |
| Team details | United States | 191.757 | Canada | 190.456 | Japan | 187.993 |

== Point standings ==
| Place | Nation | Total |
|---|---|---|
| 1 | United States | 63 |
| 2 | Canada | 47 |
| 3 | Russia | 40 |
| 4 | Japan | 39 |
| 5 | France | 28 |
| 6 | Italy | 12 |
| 7 | (United Kingdom) Great Britain | 11 |
| 8 | China | 10 |
| 9 | Netherlands | 6 |
| 10 | Venezuela | 3 |
| 11 | Switzerland | 0 |

== Medal table ==
| Rank | Nation | Gold | Silver | Bronze | Total |
|---|---|---|---|---|---|
| 1 | United States | 3 | 0 | 0 | 3 |
| 2 | Canada | 0 | 2 | 1 | 3 |
| 3 | Russia | 0 | 1 | 1 | 2 |
| 4 | Japan | 0 | 0 | 1 | 1 |
| Totals (4 entries) | | 3 | 3 | 3 | 9 |
