= 1999 FINA Synchronised Swimming World Cup =

International synchronised swimming competition

The 9th FINA Synchronised Swimming World Cup was held September 8–12, 1999, in Seoul, Korea. It featured swimmers from 12 nations, swimming in three events: Solo, Duet, and Team.

== Participating nations ==
12 nations swam at the 1999 Synchro World Cup:

- Brazil
- Canada
- China
- France
- Italy
- Japan
- Korea
- Mexico
- Russia
- Spain
- Switzerland
- USA

== Results ==
Event	Gold		Silver		Bronze	
Solo details	Olga Brusnikina; Russia	99.406	Virginie Dedieu; France	97.747	Miya Tachibana; Japan	97.583
Duet details	Olga Brusnikina; Mariya Kiselyova; Russia	99.364	Miya Tachibana; Miho Takeda; Japan	97.773	Elena Azarova; Olga Novokshchenova; Russia	97.643
Team details	Russia	99.650	Japan	98.527	Canada	97.253

== Point standings ==
Place	Nation	Total
1	Russia	498
2	Japan	467
3	United States	437
4	Canada	435
5	France	389
6	Italy	381
7	China	349
8	Spain	321
9	(South Korea) Korea	328
10	Switzerland	266
11	Mexico	244
12	Brazil	243
