= 1997 FINA Synchronised Swimming World Cup =

International synchronised swimming competition

The 8th FINA Synchronised Swimming World Cup was held July 16–19, 1997 in Guangzhou, China. It featured swimmers from 13 nations, swimming in three events: Solo, Duet and Team.

== Participating nations ==
13 nations swam at the 1997 Synchro World Cup:

- Australia
- Canada
- China
- France
- Greece
- Italy
- Japan
- Korea
- Mexico
- Russia
- Switzerland
- USA
- Uzbekistan

== Results ==
| Event | Gold | | Silver | | Bronze | |
|---|---|---|---|---|---|---|
| Solo details | Olga Sedakova; Russia | 95.792 | Karen Clark (Canada) Japan | 94.267 | Virginie Dedieu; France | 93.641 |
| Duet details | Olga Sedakova; Olga Brusnikina; Russia | 95.265 | Miya Tachibana; Miho Takeda; Japan | 93.544 | Kasia Kulesza; Jacinthe Taillon; Canada | 92.853 |
| Team details | Russia | 99.317 | Japan | 98.104 | United States | 96.829 |

== Point standings ==
| Place | Nation | Total |
|---|---|---|
| 1 | Russia | 132 |
| 2 | Japan | 117 |
| 3 | Canada | 112 |
| 4 | China | 97 |
| 5 | France | 86 |
| 6 | United States | 81 |
| 7 | Italy | 68 |
| 8 | (South Korea) Korea | 55 |
| 9 | Switzerland | 33 |
| 10 | Australia | 30 |
| 11 | Mexico | 12 |
| 12 | Greece | 8 |
| 13 | Uzbekistan | 7 |
