= Mauro Merlino =

Mauro Merlino (born 14 December 1969) is a social and political activist in Modena, Italy whose work has gained international notoriety for his peaceful movements, and set freedom of speech precedents in an Italian court of law regarding social media.

== Equitalia and Freedom of Speech ==
Mauro Merlino known for his Italian public protest against tax giant Equitalia circa 2013-2016 which turned into a "David and Golitath" court case of Italy. This is due to the fact Merlino created a YouTube video gone viral about the tax collection office, which is Italy's version of the IRS. Equitalia differs in that it has exorbitant tax rates and compounded fines imposed if taxes are unpaid. In the forty-second video, he stated in his own opinion that Equitalia could incite suicide to citizens due to their high tax rates and heavy collection tactics. His "I will sell a kidney just to pay my taxes" slogans went viral, being picked up by mainstream media. Soon after the video went viral it was removed from YouTube, and a libel "defamation" lawsuit was brought upon him. Merlino fought back in social media with a lawsuit that took several years to be brought to court in Modena. Merlino's victory against former President of Equitalia, Attilo Befera, was widely publicized, setting a precedent for Italian freedom of speech and opinion on social media outlets. and gaining him much notoriety in his hometown of Modena.

== TV and MiniSeries About Mauro Merlino's Equitalia Case ==
Merlino appeared on Quinta Colonna, (Fifth Column) a popular talk show on Mediaset one of Italy's main television stations discussing his case and peaceful protest. During this protest, he was joined by political activists including the Five Star Movement. Merlino had gone on a hunger strike, wore a Guy Fawkes mask and a coffin was set on fire, which created much publicity for the case.

Later, MediaSet studios would make a small miniseries of his trials and tribulations regarding the case on the show "Striscia La Notizi" (Strictly News).

== Gay and Lesbian Rights ==
Merlino served as President of the Italian "Gay Harvey Milk Association" for several years circa 2012 protesting gay, lesbian, and transgender rights for Italy. To this day, his work is recognized and followed by gay and lesbian groups in Europe.

== Protesting Financial Crisis As Superhero Spider-Man ==
In August 2016, Merlino started dressing as superhero Spider-Man to protest the lack of support and aid given to the financial crisis of Italy. He started walking the squares of the towns first in hometown of Sassuolo, and other regions such as Reggio Emilia. to bring awareness to the financial crisis of Italy. During this process, he helped a local business owner at the Manhattan Coffee Bar protest a $5000 Euro fine imposed by the police for the installment of video cameras to protect his business. A fundraiser was organized by Merlino of which over 100 people attended and donated to raise money for the fine, so the bar owner could stay in business.

== Earthquake Protests as Spider-Man ==
By late August 2016, attention was diverted to the victims of the 2016 6.2 Earthquakes impacting central Italy (namely the Amatrice region). He began marching in the squares of several towns, and ended up trekking over 300 miles to bring solidarity to the victims by suggesting a "smile initiative" for the children impacted. Protests took place in Modena, with the help of other superheroes and Mantua (Mantova). Later, he would travel to the Earthquake zone in the snow, talking to the mayor of Rieti.

He was said to have walked 300 miles to the Earthquake site with other superheroes, and even climbed buildings of which his story gained international attention in the United States originally published in The Local and Italian Tribune.

His protest in Mantua (Italians refer to this city as Mantova) in March 2017 was highly publicized, gained him front-page news and a special segment of how Spider-Man brings smiles to the children who have been impacted by the earthquake. The video outlined a day in the life of Spider-Man in the City of Mantua. The newspaper edition compared the activist's peaceful methods to Gandhi's methods calling him a "Gandhian protestor".

== Ferrari Factory Political Stunt ==
Merlino tried to pose as a reporter just to enter the Ferrari Factory gates to join the Renzi-Merkel summit but he was prevented by security, however, the stunt gained him much media attention for his political protests. and gained him much notoriety in his town of Modena.

== Other projects ==
Merlino's non profit The Voice of the Unheard, or as called in Italian "LA VOCE DEGLI INASCOLTATI" primarily focuses on civil, social, and disability issues. Projects included stem cell research, unemployed citizens, and protests for the financial crisis in Italy.

== Personal life ==
Merlino was born in Lucca, Italy. He currently resides in Fiorano Modenese, Modena.
