= 1991 FINA Synchronised Swimming World Cup =

International synchronised swimming competition

The 5th FINA Synchronised Swimming World Cup was held September 12–15, 1991 in Bonn, Germany. It featured swimmers from 10 nations, swimming in three events: Solo, Duet and Team.

== Participating nations ==
10 nations swam at the 1991 Synchro World Cup:

- Canada
- China
- France
- Germany
- Italy
- Japan
- Netherlands
- Soviet Union
- United States
- Venezuela

== Results ==
Event	Gold		Silver		Bronze	
Solo details	Sylvie Fréchette; Canada	96.16	Kristen Babb-Sprague; United States	95.99	Fumiko Okuno; Japan	94.88
Duet details	Karen Josephson; Sarah Josephson; United States	96.86	Fumiko Okuno; Aki Takayama; Japan	95.25	Christine Larsen; Kathy Glen; Canada	94.92
Team details	United States	96.10	Canada	95.21	Soviet Union	93.75

== Point standings ==
Place	Nation	Total
1	United States	61
2	Canada	49
3	Japan	40
4	Soviet Union	39
5	China	20
6	France	20
7	Italy	18
8	Germany	9
9	Netherlands	2
10	Venezuela	3

== Medal table ==
Rank	Nation	Gold	Silver	Bronze	Total
1	United States	2	1	0	3
2	Canada	1	1	1	3
3	Japan	0	1	1	2
4	Soviet Union	0	0	1	1
Totals (4 entries)		3	3	3	9
