= 1979 FINA Synchronised Swimming World Cup =

International synchronised swimming competition

The 1st FINA Synchronised Swimming World Cup was held 1979 in Tokyo, Japan. It had swimmers from eight nations, swimming in three events: solo, duet and team.

== Participating nations ==
Eight nations swam at the 1979 Synchro World Cup:

- Canada
- Federal Republic of Germany
- Great Britain
- Japan
- Mexico
- Netherlands
- Switzerland
- USA

== Results ==
Event	Gold		Silver		Bronze	
Solo details	Helen Vanderburg; Canada	193.0334	Michelle Beaulieu; United States	188.5333	Yuki Ishii; Japan	179.1833
Duet details	Helen Vanderburg; Kelly Kryczka; Canada	187.4167	Michelle Barone; Linda Shelley; United States	186.1417	Yasuko Unezaki; Kinuyo Okada; Japan	179.6003
Team details	United States	188.4958	Japan	183.8917	Canada	183.0750

== Point standings ==
Place	Nation	Total
1	United States	34
2	Canada	34
3	Japan	27
4	Netherlands	18
5	(United Kingdom) Great Britain	17
6	Mexico	6
7	(West Germany) Federal Republic of Germany	7
8	Switzerland	8
