= Helen Vanderburg =

Canadian synchronized swimmer

Personal information
- Full name: Helen Vanderburg
- National team: Canada
- Born: April 12, 1959 (age 67) Calgary, Alberta
- Spouse: Terry Kane

Sport
- Sport: Swimming
- Strokes: Synchronised swimming
- Club: Calgary Aquabelles
- Coach: Debbie Muir
Medal record
Synchronised swimming
Representing Canada
World Aquatics Championships
Gold medal – first place	1978 West Berlin	Solo
Gold medal – first place	1978 West Berlin	Duet
Pan American Games
Gold medal – first place	1979 San Juan	Solo
Gold medal – first place	1979 San Juan	Duet
Silver medal – second place	1979 San Juan	Team

Helen Vanderburg (born January 12, 1959) is a former Canadian synchronized swimmer and world champion.

== Career ==
Vanderburg began synchronized swimming in 1969 at age eleven. From 1971 to 1973, she was a member of junior national championship teams, and in 1973 she captured the junior Canadian solo and duet championships. In 1977, Vanderburg joined the senior ranks, winning the solo and duet competition with partner, Michelle Calkins at the Canadian Aquatic Championships, the first of three years that she won both events. Vanderburg was the first non-American to win the World Championship at both the Solo and Duet events, doing so at the 1978 World Aquatic Championships in West Berlin. After Calkins' retirement in 1978, Vanderburg partnered with Kelly Kryczka and they went on to win gold in the duet, at the 1979 Pan American Games, Vanderburg also won gold in the solo event. Vanderburg retired from competition in 1979.

== Titles ==
1979

- Pan American Games (in Puerto Rico) - gold in both solo and duet; silver in the team
- Fina World Cup (in Tokyo) - gold in both solo and duet
- Pan Pacific Games (in Christchurch, New Zealand) - gold in solo
- Canadian Senior Champion - solo, duet and figures

1978

- World Aquatics Championships (in Berlin) - gold in both solo and duet
- Canadian Senior Champion - solo, duet and figures

1977

- Pan Pacific Games (in Mexico City, Mexico) - gold in duet; silver in solo and team
- Canadian Senior Champion - both solo and duet

1973

- Canadian Jr. Champion - both solo and duet

== Honors ==
Vanderburg was awarded the Velma Springstead Trophy in 1979 as Canada's outstanding female athlete of the year Vanderburg was elected to the Canadian Sports Hall of Fame in 1983. She was inducted into the Alberta Sports Hall of Fame in 1980, and in 1985, she was inducted into the International Swimming Hall of Fame.

== See also ==
- List of members of the International Swimming Hall of Fame
