= 1985 FINA Synchronized Swimming World Cup =

International synchronised swimming competition

The 2nd FINA Synchronized Swimming World Cup was held 1985 in Indianapolis, USA. It featured swimmers from 3 nations, swimming in three events: Solo, Duet and Team.

== Participating nations ==
3 nations swam at the 1985 Synchro World Cup:

- Canada
- Japan
- United States

== Results ==
Event	Gold		Silver		Bronze	
Solo details	Carolyn Waldo; Canada	195.200	Sarah Josephson; United States	191.667	Saeko Kimura; Japan	185.383
Duet details	Carolyn Waldo; Michelle Cameron; Canada	191.667	Karen Josephson; Sarah Josephson; United States	190.767	Saeko Kimura; Takiyo Sasao; Japan	185.883
Team details	Canada	189.900	United States	187.716	Japan	184.722

== Point standings ==
Place	Nation	Total
1	Canada	
2	United States	
3	Japan	
