= 2002 FINA Synchronised Swimming World Cup =

International synchronised swimming competition

The 10th FINA Synchronised Swimming World Cup was held September 12–15, 2002 in Zurich, Switzerland. It featured swimmers from 12 nations, swimming in three events: Solo, Duet and Team.

== Participating nations ==
12 nations swam at the 2002 Synchro World Cup:

- Brazil
- Canada
- China
- Egypt
- France
- Greece
- Italy
- Japan
- Russia
- Spain
- Switzerland
- USA

== Results ==
Event	Gold		Silver		Bronze	
Solo details	Virginie Dedieu; France	99.167	Miya Tachibana; Japan	97.334	Anastasia Davydova; Russia	97.000
Duet details	Anastasia Ermakova; Anastasia Davydova; Russia	98.501	Miho Takeda; Miya Tachibana; Japan	98.250	Claire Carver-Dias; Fanny Létourneau; Canada	96.500
Team details	Russia	98.833	Japan	98.000	United States	96.501

== Point standings ==
Place	Nation	Solo	Duet	Team	Total
1	Russia	118	174	192	484
2	Japan	112	168	186	466
3	United States	104	156	180	440
4	Canada	94	153	174	421
5	Spain	98	138	168	404
6	China	84	132	162	378
7	France	96	126	138	360
8	Italy	66	99	156	321
9	Greece	54	90	150	294
10	Brazil	58	102	132	292
11	Switzerland	62	78	144	284
12	Egypt	20	33	126	179
