= Thomas K. Cureton Jr. =

American researcher and educator (1901–1992)

- Born: Thomas Kirk Cureton Jr. August 4, 1901
- Died: December 18, 1992 (aged 91); Urbana, Illinois, US
- Education: Georgia Tech; Sheffield Scientific School; Springfield College
- Occupations: Researcher, educator

Thomas Kirk Cureton Jr. (August 4, 1901 – December 18, 1992) was an American researcher and educator, known for his discoveries in physical fitness.

== Early life and education ==
Cureton was born on August 4, 1901, one of four children and the only son of Thomas Kirk Cureton Sr. and Annie Jeffreys. He grew up in Florida, between St. Augustine and Jacksonville. Though he suffered from asthma, he spent his childhood outdoors hunting, playing sports, and swimming. At age twelve, his father purchased him a membership to the Jacksonville YMCA. He was also a Boy Scout. In 1913, his family moved to Orlando, later moving to Waycross, Georgia, then Atlanta.

In Atlanta, Cureton attended Midtown High School and simultaneously worked as a bank teller. He graduated from high school in 1919, after which his father suggested he remain a banker. Cureton said doing so would "drive him mad", so he instead matriculated at Georgia Tech in the fall of 1920. While at Georgia Tech, he subsidized himself by working as an electrician and drafter. He also participated in the school's Reserve Officers' Training Corps (ROTC) and its cross country and swim teams. Though he broke a state record for a six-mile race as a freshman, he was more active as a swimmer. In the summers of 1920, 1921, and 1923, he appeared in the Southern Amateur Athletic Union swimming conference, placing in the top three in seven events between the three appearances.

Cureton transferred to the Sheffield Scientific School in the fall of 1922, where he studied electrical engineering. He participated in the school's ROTC and its cross country ahd swim teams. In 1924 and 1925, respectively, he was awarded a varsity letter for his performance in swimming. While there, he grew interested in physical education, with him taking physical science electives. He graduated in 1925.

After graduating from Sheffield, Cureton was hired by Suffield Academy. During summers, he attended Springfield College to further his study in physical education. He earned his Bachelor of Physical Education on August 1, 1929, after which he progressed to a Master of Physical Education in 1930; he also became a lecturer of the school after earning his Bachelor. He then attended Columbia University, graduating in December 1936.

As a result of his prior involvement in the ROTC, Cureton was a captain in the United States Army Signal Corps between 1929 and 1934, after which he resigned.

== Career ==
From 1925 to 1929, Cureton worked as director of physical education for Sheffield Academy. In his position, he coached girls' basketball, boys' ice hockey, and boys' cross country. He joined the faculty of Springfield College in September 1929, where he taught mathematics and chemistry. He also coached its swim team until resigning in 1936. He and James H. McCurdy researched the 1932 Winter Olympics.

Cureton remained associated with the YMCA, and supervised for some of its summer camps between 1923 and 1926. From 1923 to 1936, he supervised for summer camps operated by the American Red Cross. He supervised numerous other summer camps between different organizations throughout his life.

From the fall of 1941 to 1969, Cureton was faculty of the University of Illinois Urbana-Champaign, as associate professor of Physical Education. Throughout his career, he wrote more than 50 books.

While researching his ancestry, Cureton became an expert in genealogy. He primarily researched and published physical education, however.

== Personal life and death ==
Cureton married Isabelle Jeffcott on June 26, 1925. They had one child together, and they divorced in 1940. He then married Portia Miller in 1941, with whom he had two children.

As an avid swimmer, he broke fourteen swimming world records, and was inducted into the International Swimming Hall of Fame in 1980.

Cureton died on December 18, 1992, aged 91, in Urbana, Illinois.
