= 1995 FINA Synchronized Swimming World Cup =

International synchronised swimming competition

The 7th FINA Synchronized Swimming World Cup was held August 1–5, 1995 in Atlanta, USA. It featured swimmers from 9 nations, swimming in three events: Solo, Duet and Team.

== Participating nations ==
9 nations swam at the 1995 Synchro World Cup:

- Canada
- China
- France
- Great Britain
- Italy
- Japan
- Mexico
- Russia
- United States

== Results ==
Event	Gold		Silver		Bronze	
Solo details	Becky Dyroen-Lancer; United States	97.163	Lisa Alexander; Canada	96.193	Olga Sedakova; Russia	95.710
Duet details	Jill Sudduth; Becky Dyroen-Lancer; United States	96.535	Lisa Alexander; Erin Woodley; Canada	95.563	Mariya Kiselyova; Yelena Azarova; Russia	95.309
Team details	United States	96.615	Canada	95.530	Russia	94.899

== Point standings ==
Place	Nation	Total
1	United States	63
2	Canada	49
3	Russia	42
4	Japan	35
5	France	28
6	China	19
7	Italy	14
8	Mexico	5
9	(United Kingdom) Great Britain	4

== Medal table ==
Rank	Nation	Gold	Silver	Bronze	Total
1	United States	3	0	0	3
2	Canada	0	3	0	3
3	Russia	0	0	3	3
Totals (3 entries)		3	3	3	9
