= George Haines =

American swimmer and coach (1924–2006)

Biographical details
- Born: March 9, 1924; Huntington, Indiana, U.S.
- Died: May 1, 2006 (aged 82); Carmichael, California, U.S.
- Education: San Jose State

Playing career
- 30's-40's: Huntington YMCA; Coach Glenn S. Hummer
- 1942-1945: U.S. Coast Guard
- 1946-1950: San Jose State; Coach Charles Lynn Walker
- Positions: Distance Freestyle, IM (YMCA); Freestyle 50, 100 (San Jose)

Coaching career (HC unless noted)
- 1950-1973: Santa Clara High School; Santa Clara Swim Club
- 1974-1978: UCLA
- 1978-1980: Foxcatcher Swim Club, AAU; Philadelphia (Newton Square)
- 1980-1988: Stanford University Women
- 1960, '68, '80: Olympic Head Coach

Head coaching record
- Overall: 215-0 (1950-1973 Santa Clara High)

Accomplishments and honors

Championships
- 1983 NCAA Women's championship (Stanford); 35 AAU National Team Championships (Santa Clara)

Awards
- 1965 AAU Swimming Award; International Swim. Hall of Fame '77; Hall of Fame Coach of the Century '01; National Colleg. & Schol. Trophy (A.S.C.A.); A.S.C.A. Coach of the Year (1964, 1966, 1967, 1972); 2000 ISHOF Coach of the Century

George Frederick Haines (March 9, 1924 – May 1, 2006) was an American competitive swimmer and coach who for twenty-three years coached the highly successful Santa Clara Swim Club which he founded in 1951. He later coached UCLA, Stanford University, and six U.S. Olympic swim teams. In 1977, he was inducted as an Honor Coach into the International Swimming Hall of Fame who later voted him "Coach of the Century" in 2001.

== Early life ==
Haines was born on March 9, 1924, in Huntington, Indiana, the son of George Fremont Haines and Frances Mae Mow, and became interested in swimming after joining the local Huntington YMCA, where he won two YMCA championships in the mid-1930s, and was coached by Glenn Sharp Hummer. Hummer, an All American in football for the University of Illinois, coached the Huntington team from 1933 to 1977. Haines learned many of the methods he later used to participate in and teach long-distance freestyle from Hummer, who became a long distance enthusiast. As a youth, Haines won a national junior title in the half-mile event, and performed well in the 1,500 meter swim, the close equivalent of a mile. As a young swimmer, in a local three-mile race in the open water of the White River in Southern Indiana, Haines placed second with a time of around 36 minutes, perhaps aided by a strong current at his back. Excelling in distance swimming as well as stroke competition, in 1940-41 Haines was a Junior AAU National Champion in both the 800 freestyle with a time of 11:41.2, and the 400 meter Individual Medley. Again showing skills as a stroke competitor, Haines won the 200-yard Individual Medley with a time of 1:45.4, at the Kentucky Indoor AAU Championship at the Louisville YMCA on March 22, 1947.

=== Coast Guard service ===
Not widely known about Haines, in addition to swimming mostly short-distance freestyle events with the Coast Guard team while stationed in Alameda, California, from around 1942–45, he learned to coach swimming while he was in the Coast Guard teaching Marines and sailors survival swimming. Influencing his future approach to coaching, the U.S. Military was a learning environment that measured and demanded achievement from students and expected them to respect their instructors.

On April 13, 1946, returning to Indiana to swim for the Huntington YMCA, Haines helped clinch Huntington "Y"'s tenth consecutive YMCA State Swimming Championship by winning the 50-yard freestyle in a record time of 31.1 seconds.

=== San Jose State ===
After serving in the Coast Guard, Haines originally planned to attend Michigan's Kalamazoo College upon learning that Glen Hummer would coach the swim team and a new swimming facility would be constructed. As Hummer had not consented to coach the team and a new facility was not built, Haines moved to California to enroll in college. He attended San Jose State University from around 1946–1950, where he competed for Coach Charles "Charley" Lynn Walker. Walker coached the San Jose Swim team for 21 seasons, and was presented by the College Swimming Coaches Association of America with a 25-year bronze trophy for his service in 1958. Haines was conference champion in the 50-meter freestyle before graduating in 1950. By May 1950, San Jose State had won six successive California Collegiate Athletic Association (CCAA) team Championships. On April 29–30, 1950, at the CCAA Championship, Haines won the 100-yard freestyle with a time of 57.3. In addition to competing as a swimmer, in 1948 Haines played water polo for San Jose's undefeated Freshman team under Coach Charles Walker, scoring 48 goals, as the high scorer in 13 matches.

== Santa Clara Swim Club ==
Though he began coaching at Santa Clara the prior year, in 1951 he officially founded the Santa Clara Swim Club, the team that would establish his career and reputation. He coached the Santa Clara High School Swim and football team and the Water Polo Team which remained at the High School. Santa Clara Swim Club started out as a thirteen-member club located in the old Santa Clara High School, but soon became a training ground for competitive swimmers from throughout the United States. It now conducts training at the Santa Clara Swim Center. Haines coached the club for 23 years, leaving Santa Clara in 1973. While at Santa Clara, he coached 26 future Olympians including Mark Spitz, Greg Buckingham, Don Schollander, Donna deVarona, Chris von Saltza, Claudia Kolb, and Lynn Vidali. During Haines's 23-year tenure, Santa Clara won a nearly unmatched 43 national club team titles, 26 women's, and 9 men's.

== Olympic coach ==
In 1960, Haines was selected to coach at the 1960 Summer Olympics, and seven of his swimmers from Santa Clara qualified, including 1960 gold medalists Chris von Saltza, Lynn Burke, George Harrison, and Paul Hait; the first class also included Donna de Varona and Steve Clark, who would win gold at the 1964 Olympics. In the 1960s, multi-gold medalists Don Schollander and Mark Spitz joined Santa Clara to train with Haines prior to their success at the 1964, 1968, and 1972 Olympics. Sources vary, but in 1960, he was Head coach for the Olympic Women's Swimming Team. He was Head Coach for the Olympic Men's team in 1968 and in 1980 when America boycotted the Moscow Olympics. He served as an Assistant Coach in a few additional Olympics in the 1970s.

== Coaching UCLA and Stanford ==
From 1974 to 1978, Haines coached the UCLA men's swimming team. UCLA twice finished third in the NCAA during his tenure. After leaving UCLA, he took an AAU coaching job in Philadelphia with the new Foxcatcher Swim club from 1978 to 1980 taking a sizable salary, and replacing ASCA Hall of Fame Coach Frank Keefe, who began coaching at Yale in September 1978.

In 1982, Haines started coaching the Women's Swim Team at Stanford University, and led them to an NCAA championship in 1983 as well as two second-place finishes and two third-place finishes. He coached the Stanford Women's team for seven seasons, through around 1988. One of his swimmers at Stanford, Susan von der Lippe was a gold and silver medalist in medley and breaststroke at the 1984 Los Angeles Olympics, and qualified for the U.S. Olympic team in both 1980 and 1988.

== Legacy ==
After his stint at Stanford, he retired from coaching swimming in 1988. George's achievements were exceptional and remain unprecedented. By the time of his retirement, he had coached 53 Olympic team swimmers, who won a total of 44 gold, 14 silver and 10 bronze medals. The majority of his Olympians were from his Santa Clara Swim Club teams. During his retirement, he coached senior softball, leading a team to West Palm Beach's Senior Softball World Series.

He spent most of his retirement in Sacramento, where he enjoyed golf, occasionally returning to Santa Clara, or Palo Alto to watch and attend meets.

Haines suffered a stroke around 2004, which incapacitated him for the rest of his life. He died in a nursing home in Carmichael, California, on May 1, 2006. He was married in 1945 to June Carter Haines, and the couple had five children. Haines's children mirrored his athletic ability, with his daughter Kerry competing on three national teams as a swimmer. His Daughter Janice played tennis for UCLA, Judy was both a coach and gymnast, and Paula played High School tennis as a city-wide tennis champion. His son Kyle competed in track and wrestling. A bronze statue of Haines now stands next to the Olympic-size pool at the Santa Clara Swim Center. In 2000, the center was renamed the George F. Haines International Swim Center in his honor. Around 2000, he was named the Coach of the Century by the International Swimming Hall of Fame.

== See also ==
- List of members of the International Swimming Hall of Fame
