= Santa Clara Swim Club =

American swim club

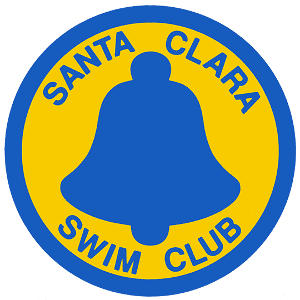

Club information
- Full name: Santa Clara Swim Club
- Nickname(s): SCSC
- Short name: SCSC
- City: Santa Clara, California, United States
- Founded: 1951
- Home pool(s): George F. Haines International Swim Center; 2625 Patricia Drive; Santa Clara, Cal.
- Website: santaclaraswimclub.org

Swimming
- Head coach: Kevin Zacher

The Santa Clara Swim Club (abbreviated SCSC) is an American swimming club and team based in Santa Clara, California. Part of USA Swimming, it is a USA Swimming Silver Medal Club and a part of the Pacific Swimming LSC, sub-governed by Zone 1 South. Recognized as a premier training center, the Santa Clara swim club has produced more International Swimming Hall of Fame swimmers than any other swim club on earth.

== History ==
=== Coaching ===
The club was founded in 1951 by Hall of Fame Coach George Haines, who remained with the team until 1974. During Haines's 23-year tenure, Santa Clara won a nearly unmatched 43 national club team titles, 26 women's, and 9 men's.

In 1985, Jay Fitzgerald was named head coach and remained until 1995. His goal was to build and manage a swimming program that could produce athletes that were competitive from both beginners to elite swimmers. At the USA Senior Nationals from 1989 to 1992, the SCSC was ranked in the top five, and in 1992 captured a prestigious first place finish.

From 1995-2007, Hall of Fame Coach Dick Jochums led the Santa Clara Swim Club's men's team where he took three national titles from 1996 through 1998, and got 18 finishes in the top five. The Club maintains a competitive team under head coach Kevin Zacher (the former coach of Taylor Ruck), who was preceded by John Bitter. Bitter was required to leave due to misappropriated funds.

=== Outstanding swimmers ===
The club has many notable alumni, including Donna de Varona, Pablo Morales, Don Schollander, Mark Spitz, Chris von Saltza, Lynn Burke, George Harrison, Tom Bruce, Mitch Ivey, Steve Clark, Sharon Finneran, Claudia Kolb, Lillian Watson, Cathy Jamison, Joe Bottom, Mike Bottom, John Hencken, Lynn Vidali, Linda Jezek, Dick Roth, Jan Henne, Tom Wilkens, Ed Townsend, Linda Gustavson, Greg Buckingham (brother of former guitarist of Fleetwood Mac, Lindsey Buckingham), and Paul Hait. Swimmers from the club have earned 71 Olympic medals: 42 gold, 18 silver, and 11 bronze. The Swim Center is also home to the Santa Clara Diving Club. It is also the home of the Santa Clara Aquamaids, a premier synchronized swimming club.

=== The Santa Clara International Swim Center, 1966 ===
In 1966, the City of Santa Clara built the Santa Clara International Swim Center, which became the home of the club. It was renamed the George F. Haines International Swim Center in June 2001 in honor of its founding coach. A bronze statue of Haines now stands next to the Olympic-size pool at the Santa Clara Swim Center.

The Swim Center has hosted the Santa Clara International Grand Prix annually for 42 years. Since its inception, 23 world records, 333 American records, and 64 foreign national records have been set at the meet, including a world record set by Michael Phelps in 2003. The Swim Center has hosted Senior Nationals, Junior Nationals, Western Zone Championships, Pacific Swimming Far Western Championships, and Masters Nationals.

The Santa Clara Swim Club is known for its history as a successful swim club, and for a time in the 1960s-1970s was widely considered the premier club in the United States. The Masters's program is highly popular as well. The former president of the board of directors of the team is former Olympian Chris Cavanaugh. The annual Santa Clara International Grand Prix continues to regularly attract Olympic athletes including Michael Phelps.
