= Synchronized swimming at the 1979 Pan American Games =

- No. of events: 3

Synchronized swimming at the 1979 Pan American Games was held from July 1 to July 15, 1979 in San Juan, Puerto Rico. There were three medal events. For the first time, the women's solo and duet events were not won by an American.

== Medal table ==
Rank	Nation	Gold	Silver	Bronze	Total
1	Canada (CAN)	2	1	0	3
2	United States (USA)	1	2	0	3
3	Mexico (MEX)	0	0	2	2
4	Cuba (CUB)	0	0	1	1
Totals (4 entries)		3	3	3	9

== Medalists ==
Event	Gold	Silver	Bronze
Solo	Helen Vanderburg; Canada	Michele Beaulieu; United States	Lourdes de la Guardia; Cuba
Duet	Canada (CAN); Kelly Kryczka; Helen Vanderburg	United States (USA); Michele Barone; Linda Shelley	Mexico (MEX); Mireya Andrade; Gabriela Terroba
Team	United States (USA); Michelle Barone; Michelle Beaulieu; Gerri Brandley; Suzanne Cameron; Laura Florio; Linda Shelley; Tracie Ruiz; Pam Tryon; Tara Cameron; Karen Callaghan	Canada (CAN)	Mexico (MEX)
