= Maxine Merlino =

American artist and arts educator

- Merlino in 1983
- Born: July 25, 1912; Portland, Oregon, U.S.
- Died: November 3, 2013 (aged 101); Madrid, Spain
- Other name: Maxine Seelbinder

Maxine Ollie Seelbinder Merlino (July 25, 1912 – November 3, 2013) was an American illustrator, muralist, and arts educator known for her 1943 mural of Benjamin Banneker.

== Career ==
Merlino attended the Portland Art Museum School before moving to New York City after receiving a scholarship to the Art Students' League in New York City. She studied there under noted muralist Anton Refregier. She worked in New York from 1936 to 1943 as an illustrator, muralist, and theatrical set designer.

Benjamin Banneker- Surveyor-Inventor-Astronomer, painted by Merlino in 1943

In 1941, she won a national competition to illustrate the bar murals of the SS President Garfield. She worked as a scientific illustrator for the Army Air Force during the World War II. In 1943, Merlino beat out 10,000 applicants to win the $750 first prize, one of seven commissions to paint murals in the Recorder of Deeds Building in Washington D. C. After the war she worked as set and costume designer for Preston Sturges. In 1949, she was part of the original class at Long Beach State University, receiving her MA in 1952. She joined the art faculty and also worked as the first technical director. She earned her doctorate at the University of Southern California and worked at what had become Cal State University Long Beach as the Dean of the School of Fine Arts until her retirement in 1976, teaching drawing and painting, as well as set design for theater.

== Swimming ==
Merlino was a competitive swimmer in her teens and twenties, holding the Pacific Coast backstroke championship for twelve years. She returned to swimming post-retirement and began swimming competitively. She has set 59 world age group records, and won 19 U.S. Masters Swimming National championships. In 1983 and 1988 she set national records for short course yards in every event with only one exception, setting records until she was 90. She was among the first class of inductees to the International Swimmers Hall of Fame and was the Southern Pacific Masters Swimming Swimmer of the Year in 1997.

== Personal life and legacy ==
Merlino was born in Portland, Oregon in 1912 to Ernest August Seelbinder and Ollie Shuey Seelbinder. She married Dante Merlino, a ship builder, in 1936. The couple settled in Long Beach, California in 1943. They had a son named Dante in 1939. They divorced in July 1970.

Cal State University Long Beach dedicated an art gallery in her name, the Dr. Maxine Merlino Gallery, in February 2003. She donated her papers to the Smithsonian Archives of American Art in 2003.
