= Swimming at the 1948 Summer Olympics – Women's 200 metre breaststroke =

Women's 200 metre breaststroke at the Games of the XIV Olympiad
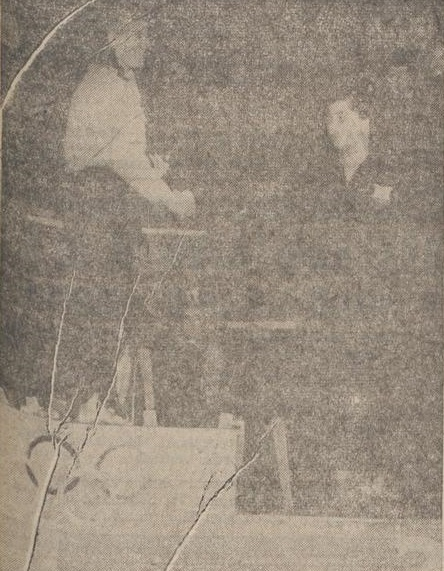
- Podium of the women's 200 metre breaststroke. Van Vliet (left) and Novák (right)
- Venue: Empire Pool
- Date: 30 July (heats); 31 July (semifinals); 3 August (final)
- Competitors: 22 from 14 nations
- Winning time: 2:57.2

Medalists
1st place, gold medalist(s)		Nel van Vliet	Netherlands
2nd place, silver medalist(s)		Nancy Lyons	Australia
3rd place, bronze medalist(s)		Éva Novák-Gerard	Hungary

The women's 200 metre breaststroke event, included in the swimming competition at the 1948 Summer Olympics, took place from 30 July to 3 August at the Empire Pool. In this event, swimmers covered four lengths of the 50-metre (160 ft) Olympic-sized pool employing the breaststroke. It was the fifth appearance of the event, which first appeared at the 1924 Summer Olympics in Paris. It was also the first appearance of the event since the outbreak of World War II. A total of 22 competitors from 14 nations participated in the event.

== Records ==
Prior to this competition, the existing world and Olympic records were:

World record	Nel van Vliet (NED)	2:49.2 s	Hilversum, Netherlands	20 July 1947
Olympic record	Hideko Maehata (JPN)	3:01.9 s	Berlin, Germany	11 August 1936

The following records were established during the competition:

Date	Round	Name	Nationality	Time	OR	WR
30 July	Heat 2	Éva Székely	Hungary	3:01.2	OR	
30 July	Heat 3	Nel van Vliet	Netherlands	2:57.4	OR	
31 July	Semifinals	Nel van Vliet	Netherlands	2:57.0	OR	

Hungarian Éva Székely set her Olympic record in the event using the butterfly stroke, which was allowed at the time. At the 1956 Summer Olympics, a new 100m butterfly event was created. The technique was disallowed in the 200m breaststroke event that year and in all future Olympic Games.

== Results ==
=== Heats ===
The four fastest swimmers in each heat and the next four fastest swimmers overall advanced to the semifinals on 31 July.

==== Heat 1 ====
Rank	Name	Nationality	Time	Notes
1	Nancy Lyons	Australia	3:02.9	Q
1	Éva Novák-Gerard	Hungary	3:02.9	Q
3	Janny de Groot	Netherlands	3:04.4	Q
4	Elizabeth Church	Great Britain	3:07.4	Q
5	Dorotea Turnbull	Argentina	3:12.2	q
6	Liselotte Kobi	Switzerland	3:16.2	q
7	Jeanne Wilson	United States	3:18.3	
8	Anna Ólafsdóttir	Iceland	3:19.9	

==== Heat 2 ====
Rank	Name	Nationality	Time	Notes
1	Éva Székely	Hungary	3:01.2	Q, OR
2	Tonnie Hom	Netherlands	3:06.0	Q
3	Yvonne Vandekerckhove	Belgium	3:09.0	Q
4	Jacqueline Bertrand	France	3:10.7	Q
5	Jean Caplin	Great Britain	3:17.0	q
6	Helga Diederichsen	Mexico	3:27.8	
7	Penny Pence	United States	3:28.1	

==== Heat 3 ====
Rank	Name	Nationality	Time	Notes
1	Nel van Vliet	Netherlands	2:57.4	Q, OR
2	Jytte Hansen	Denmark	3:09.1	Q
3	Margit Leskinen	Finland	3:11.4	Q
4	Elenor Gordon	Great Britain	3:13.3	Q
5	Irene Strong	Canada	3:14.2	q
6	Clara LaMore	United States	3:23.6	
7	Þórdís Árnadóttir	Iceland	3:26.1	

=== Semifinals ===
The three fastest swimmers in each heat and the next two fastest overall advanced to the final on 3 August.

==== Semifinal 1 ====
Rank	Name	Nationality	Time	Notes
1	Nancy Lyons	Australia	3:00.9	Q
2	Janny de Groot	Netherlands	3:01.4	Q
3	Éva Székely	Hungary	3:02.8	Q
4	Yvonne Vandekerckhove	Belgium	3:09.7	
5	Jacqueline Bertrand	France	3:13.1	
6	Jean Caplin	Great Britain	3:14.4	
6	Dorotea Turnbull	Argentina	3:14.4	
8	Irene Strong	Canada	3:16.9	

==== Semifinal 2 ====
Rank	Name	Nationality	Time	Notes
1	Nel van Vliet	Netherlands	2:57.0	Q, OR
2	Éva Novák-Gerard	Hungary	2:58.0	Q
3	Jytte Hansen	Denmark	3:05.5	Q
4	Tonnie Hom	Netherlands	3:05.7	q
5	Elizabeth Church	Great Britain	3:07.1	q
6	Margit Leskinen	Finland	3:10.0	
7	Liselotte Kobi	Switzerland	3:13.9	
8	Elenor Gordon	Great Britain	3:15.8	

=== Final ===
Rank	Name	Nationality	Time	Notes
1st place, gold medalist(s)	Nel van Vliet	Netherlands	2:57.2	
2nd place, silver medalist(s)	Nancy Lyons	Australia	2:57.7	
3rd place, bronze medalist(s)	Éva Novák-Gerard	Hungary	3:00.2	
4	Éva Székely	Hungary	3:02.5	
5	Janny de Groot	Netherlands	3:06.2	
6	Elizabeth Church	Great Britain	3:06.1	
7	Tonnie Hom	Netherlands	3:07.5	
8	Jytte Hansen	Denmark	3:08.1	

== Sources ==
- "The Official Report of the Organising Committee for the XIV Olympiad" (PDF). The Organising Committee for the XIV Olympiad. 1948. p. 462. Archived from the original (PDF) on 16 July 2011.
- "Swimming at the 1948 London Summer Games: Women's 200 metres Breaststroke". Olympics at Sports-Reference.com. Sports Reference, LLC. Archived from the original on 17 April 2020.
