= Swimming at the 1952 Summer Olympics – Women's 200 metre breaststroke =

Women's 200 metre breaststroke at the Games of the XV Olympiad
- Venue: Helsinki Swimming Stadium
- Date: 26 July (heats); 27 July (semifinals); 29 July (final)
- Competitors: 34 from 19 nations
- Winning time: 2:51.7 OR

Medalists
1st place, gold medalist(s)		Éva Székely	Hungary
2nd place, silver medalist(s)		Éva Novák-Gerard	Hungary
3rd place, bronze medalist(s)		Elenor Gordon	Great Britain

The women's 200 metre breaststroke event, included in the swimming competition at the 1952 Summer Olympics, took place on 26–29 July, at the Helsinki Swimming Stadium. In this event, swimmers covered four lengths of the 50-metre (160 ft) Olympic-sized pool employing the breaststroke. It was the sixth appearance of the event, which first appeared at the 1924 Summer Olympics in Paris. A total of 33 competitors from 19 nations participated in the event.

== Records ==
Prior to this competition, the existing world and Olympic records were:

World record	Éva Novák-Gerard (HUN)	2:48.5 s	Moscow, Soviet Union	5 May 1951
Olympic record	Nel van Vliet (NED)	2:57.2 s	London, United Kingdom	31 July 1948

The following records were established during the competition:

Date	Round	Name	Nationality	Time	OR	WR
26 July	Heat 1	Éva Novák-Gerard	Hungary	2:54.0	OR	
27 July	Semifinal 2	Éva Székely	Hungary	2:54.0	OR	
29 July	Final	Éva Székely	Hungary	2:51.7	OR	

Hungarian Éva Székely used the butterfly stroke in this event, which was permissible at the time. At the 1956 Summer Olympics, the 200m breaststroke event only allowed the orthodox breaststroke to be used, and a new 100m butterfly event was created.

== Results ==
=== Heats ===
Rank	Heat	Name	Nationality	Time	Notes
1	1	Éva Novák-Gerard	Hungary	2:54.0	Q, OR
2	4	Éva Székely	Hungary	2:55.1	Q
3	5	Jytte Hansen	Denmark	2:57.7	Q
4	3	Elenor Gordon	Great Britain	2:58.6	Q
5	3	Klára Killermann	Hungary	2:59.1	Q
6	5	Nel Garritsen	Netherlands	2:59.4	Q
7	2	Lies Bonnier	Netherlands	3:00.6	Q
8	5	Ulla-Britt Eklund	Sweden	3:01.2	Q
9	5	Mariya Havrysh	Soviet Union	3:01.6	Q
10	1	Ursula Happe	Germany	3:02.7	Q
10	3	Kazuko Sakamoto	Japan	3:02.7	Q
12	4	Raymonde Vergauwen	Belgium	3:02.8	Q
13	2	Nancy Lyons	Australia	3:04.4	Q
14	4	Jean Wrigley	Great Britain	3:04.5	Q
15	1	Rika Bruins	Netherlands	3:04.7	Q
16	4	Kaija Mäkelä	Finland	3:04.7	Q
17	2	Valerie Harris	Great Britain	3:04.6	
18	5	Masayo Aoki	Japan	3:05.6	
19	3	Odette Lusien	France	3:06.7	
20	1	Vera Kostina	Soviet Union	3:07.3	
21	4	Kirsten Hedegaard Jensen	Denmark	3:07.5	
22	3	Eileen Ward Petersen	Denmark	3:09.3	
23	2	Roza Zenziveyeva	Soviet Union	3:10.5	
24	1	Ilse Albert	Austria	3:12.5	
25	1	Gail Peters	United States	3:13.3	
26	4	Irene Strong	Canada	3:13.5	
27	5	Della Sehorn	United States	3:13.7	
28	1	Margrit Knabenhans	Switzerland	3:17.4	
29	2	Judy Cornell	United States	3:17.7	
30	2	Irene Kwok	Hong Kong	3:19.2	
31	5	Liselotte Kobi	Switzerland	3:22.0	
32	4	Dolly Nazir	India	3:37.9	
33	3	Arati Saha	India	3:40.8	
34	2	Aleksandra Mróz	Poland	—	DSQ

=== Semifinals ===
Rank	Heat	Name	Nationality	Time	Notes
1	2	Éva Székely	Hungary	2:54.0	Q, OR
2	1	Éva Novák-Gerard	Hungary	2:55.8	Q
3	1	Klára Killermann	Hungary	2:56.5	Q
4	2	Elenor Gordon	Great Britain	2:57.8	Q
5	1	Mariya Havrysh	Soviet Union	2:58.6	Q
6	2	Nel Garritsen	Netherlands	2:59.5	Q
7	1	Jytte Hansen	Denmark	2:59.5	Q
8	2	Ulla-Britt Eklund	Sweden	2:59.6	Q
9	1	Lies Bonnier	Netherlands	3:00.3	
10	1	Rika Bruins	Netherlands	3:02.4	
11	2	Raymonde Vergauwen	Belgium	3:02.6	
12	2	Jean Wrigley	Great Britain	3:03.2	
13	2	Ursula Happe	Germany	3:03.8	
14	1	Kazuko Sakamoto	Japan	3:04.2	
15	1	Nancy Lyons	Australia	3:05.6	
16	2	Kaija Mäkelä	Finland	3:06.2	

=== Final ===
Rank	Name	Nationality	Time	Notes
1st place, gold medalist(s)	Éva Székely	Hungary	2:51.7	OR
2nd place, silver medalist(s)	Éva Novák-Gerard	Hungary	2:54.4	
3rd place, bronze medalist(s)	Elenor Gordon	Great Britain	2:57.6	
4	Klára Killermann	Hungary	2:57.6	
5	Jytte Hansen	Denmark	2:57.8	
6	Mariya Havrysh	Soviet Union	2:58.9	
7	Ulla-Britt Eklund	Sweden	3:01.8	
8	Nel Garritsen	Netherlands	3:02.1	

== Sources ==
- Edward A. Doyle, ed. (1956). "The Official Report of the Organising Committee for the Games of the XVI Olympiad Melbourne 1956" (PDF). Organising Committee for the Games of the XVI Melbourne. Archived from the original (PDF) on 12 September 2008.
- Sulo Kolkka, ed. (1955). "The Official Report of the Organising Committee for the Games of the XV Olympiad Helsinki 1952" (PDF). Organising Committee for the Games of the XV Olympiad Helsinki. Archived from the original (PDF) on 11 April 2008.
- "Swimming at the 1952 Helsinki Summer Games: Women's 200 metres Breaststroke". Olympics at Sports-Reference.com. Sports Reference, LLC. Archived from the original on 17 April 2020.
