= Irene Kwok =

Hong Kong swimmer

Personal information
- Full name: Kam Ngor "Irene Anita" Kwok
- Born: 12 October 1933 (age 93)

Sport
- Sport: Swimming

Kam Ngor "Irene Anita" Kwok (born 12 October 1933) is a Hong Kong former breaststroke swimmer. Domestically, Kwok represented the Lai Tsun Swimming Club. She competed in the women's 200 metre breaststroke at the 1952 Summer Olympics. There, she did not advance further from the preliminaries though became the first woman from Hong Kong to compete at the Olympic Games.

== Biography ==
Kam Ngor "Irene Anita" Kwok was born on 12 October 1933. As a swimmer, Ngor represented Hong Kong in international competition. Domestically, she represented the Lai Tsun Swimming Club.

Kwok was selected to compete for Hong Kong at the 1952 Summer Olympics held in Helsinki, Finland, for Hong Kong's debut appearance at any edition of the Olympic Games. There, she was entered in one event, the women's 200 metre breaststroke. She competed under the name Irene Anita Kwok in the second preliminary heat of the event on 26 July 1952 against six other swimmers, namely: Lies Bonnier of the Netherlands, Judy Cornell of the United States, Valerie Harris of the Great Britain, Nancy Lyons of Australia, Aleksandra Mróz of Poland, and Roza Zenziveyeva of the Soviet Union. There, Kwok recorded a time of 3:19.2 and placed sixth in her heat, failing to advance further to the semifinals held the following day as only the top 16 out of all of the heats would be able to do so. Her time was among the slowest, ranking 30th out of the 34 swimmers that competed. With her participation, she became the first woman to represent Hong Kong at the Olympic Games.
