= Swimming at the 1956 Summer Olympics – Women's 200 metre breaststroke =

Women's 200 metre breaststroke at the Games of the XVI Olympiad
- Venue: Swimming and Diving Stadium
- Date: 29 November (heats); 30 November (final)
- Competitors: 14 from 10 nations
- Winning time: 2:53.1 OR

Medalists
1st place, gold medalist(s)		Ursula Happe	United Team of Germany
2nd place, silver medalist(s)		Éva Székely	Hungary
3rd place, bronze medalist(s)		Eva-Maria ten Elsen	United Team of Germany

The women's 200 metre breaststroke event, included in the swimming competition at the 1956 Summer Olympics, took place on November 29–30, at the Swimming and Diving Stadium. In this event, swimmers covered four lengths of the 50-metre (160 ft) Olympic-sized pool employing the breaststroke. It was the seventh Olympic appearance of the event, which first appeared at the 1924 Summer Olympics in Paris. A total of 14 competitors from 10 nations participated in the event. This was a decrease from the 1952 Summer Olympics (33 competitors from 19 nations), because the breaststroke event was split into the 200m orthodox breaststroke and the 100m butterfly event.

== Records ==
Prior to this competition, the existing world and Olympic records were:

World record	Ada den Haan (NED)	2:46.4 min	Naarden, Netherlands	13 November 1956
Olympic record	Éva Novák-Gerard (HUN)	2:54.0 min	Helsinki, Finland	26 July 1952

Hungarian Éva Székely originally held the Olympic record in the event after swimming a time of 2:51.7 min four years ago. However Székely had used the butterfly stroke for her swim, which was now disallowed as a new 100 metres event had been introduced. Éva Novák-Gerard's time of 2:54.0 min in 1952 at the same event was instead replaced as the current Olympic record.

The following records were established during the competition:

Date	Round	Name	Nationality	Time	OR	WR
November 30	Final	Ursula Happe	United Team of Germany	2:53.1 min	OR	

Ursula Happe's Olympic record was set using a technique of swimming long distances underwater during her run. This technique would be disallowed by FINA in the late 1950s to ensure the majority of the race was swum on the surface.

== Results ==
=== Heats ===
Rank	Heat	Name	Nationality	Time	Notes
1	1	Ursula Happe	United Team of Germany	2:54.1	Q
2	1	Klára Killermann	Hungary	2:54.6	Q
3	1	Elenor Gordon	Great Britain	2:55.4	Q
4	2	Éva Székely	Hungary	2:55.8	Q
5	2	Vinka Jeričević	Yugoslavia	2:56.0	Q
6	2	Eva-Maria ten Elsen	United Team of Germany	2:57.5	Q
7	2	Christine Gosden	Great Britain	2:58.2	Q
7	1	Mary Sears	United States	2:58.2	Q
9	2	Jytte Hansen	Denmark	2:59.8	
10	1	Colette Goossens	Belgium	3:00.5	
11	2	Éva Novák-Gerard	Belgium	3:02.7	
12	2	Barbara Evans	Australia	3:03.6	
13	1	Elena Zennaro	Italy	3:05.2	
14	2	Ria Tobing	Indonesia	3:14.2	

=== Finals ===
Rank	Name	Nationality	Time	Notes
1st place, gold medalist(s)	Ursula Happe	United Team of Germany	2:53.1	OR
2nd place, silver medalist(s)	Éva Székely	Hungary	2:54.8	
3rd place, bronze medalist(s)	Eva-Maria ten Elsen	United Team of Germany	2:55.1	
4	Vinka Jeričević	Yugoslavia	2:55.8	
5	Klára Killermann	Hungary	2:56.1	
6	Elenor Gordon	Great Britain	2:56.1	
7	Mary Sears	United States	2:57.2	
8	Christine Gosden	Great Britain	2:59.2	

== Sources ==
- Edward A. Doyle, ed. (1956). "The Official Report of the Organising Committee for the Games of the XVI Olympiad Melbourne 1956" (PDF). Organising Committee for the Games of the XVI Melbourne.
- Sulo Kolkka, ed. (1955). "The Official Report of the Organising Committee for the Games of the XV Olympiad Helsinki 1952" (PDF). Organising Committee for the Games of the XV Olympiad Helsinki.
- "Swimming at the 1956 Melbourne Summer Games: Women's 200 metres Breaststroke". Olympics at Sports-Reference.com. Sports Reference, LLC. Archived from the original on 17 April 2020.
