= Scottish Swimming Hall of Fame =

The Scottish Swimming Hall of Fame, launched in 2010 by Scottish Swimming, is an accolade (and virtual platform) to recognize and celebrate the lifetime achievements of memorable Scottish athletes in all fields of aquatic sports. It is an event that takes place in a Commonwealth Games year, with the ceremony held at the annual awards dinner.

== Criteria ==
Nominations can be made by Clubs, Districts, SASA Life Members, Board, Council or National Committees. Nominees should contain full details of their aquatic career.

Nominees must have been an athlete. Nominees must have retired from International Competition for at least two years in the Discipline for which they are being nominated (not including Masters Events).

Nominees should have achieved one of the following standards. However, achievement of one of the following standards is not a guarantee of an automatic nomination or of a nomination being accepted.

- An Olympic or Paralympic Games Medallist
- A World Championship Medallist
- A European Gold Medallist
- A Commonwealth Gold Medallist
- Been awarded 50 GB Senior Caps for Water Polo

When nominations are being considered medalists from individual events are recognized ahead of relay medalists.

== Hall of Fame ==
=== 2010 ===
The inaugural event was held at the Glasgow Science Centre in September 2010.

Athlete	Discipline
Gregor Tait	Swimming
Jack Wardrop	Swimming
David Wilkie	Swimming
George Cornet	Water Polo
Ellen King	Swimming
Nancy Riach	Swimming
William Francis	Swimming
Norman Hamilton	Swimming
Ian Black	Swimming
Catherine Brown	Swimming
Neil Cochran	Swimming
Elenor Gordon	Swimming
Sir Peter Heatly	Diving
Robert McGregor	Swimming
Alison Sheppard	Swimming
Graeme Smith	Swimming

=== 2014 ===
The event was held at the Kelvingrove Art Gallery and Museum on 13 September 2014. It was hosted by former Olympian and BBC commentator, Steve Parry.

Athlete	Discipline
David Carry	Swimming
Kirsty Kettles	Swimming
Kris Gilchrist	Swimming
Jim Anderson	Swimming
Dr Ian Edmond	Swimming
Dr Alan McClatchey	Swimming
Gordon Downie	Swimming
Annette Mooney	Water Polo

=== 2018 ===
The event was held at the Radisson Blu hotel in Glasgow on 29 September 2018. It was hosted by TV Presenter and journalist, Lee McKenzie.

Athlete	Discipline
Kenny Cairns	Swimming
James Clegg	Swimming
Paul Easter	Swimming
Sean Fraser	Swimming
Michael Jamieson	Swimming
Andrew Lindsay	Swimming
Maggie McEleny	Swimming
Caitlin McClatchey	Swimming
Paul Noble	Swimming
Robbie Renwick	Swimming
