= Swimming at the 1958 European Aquatics Championships – Women's 200 metre breaststroke =

Qualification runs of the Women's 200 metre breaststroke at the 1958 European Aquatics Championships were held on 1 September. Final competition took place on 2 September. There were 16 participants.

== Records ==
	Name	Nationality	Result	Place	Date
World record	Ada den Haan	(Netherlands)	2:51.3	Los Rhenen	4 August 1957.

There was a new record during the competition:

Európa-bajnoki csúcs	Final	(Netherlands) Ada den Haan	2:52.0	Budapest, Hungary	2 September

== Results ==
=== Qualifications ===
Position	Race	Name	Nationality	Result	Other
1.	3	Ada den Haan	(Netherlands)	2:54.9	Q
2.	1	Wiltrud Urselmann	(Germany)	2:56.6	Q
3.	1	Eve Maurer	(Soviet Union)	2:57.1	Q
4 .	3	Bärbel Walter	(East Germany)	2:57.3	Q
5.	3	Alla Kovalenko	(Soviet Union)	2:57.4	Q
6.	2	Anita Lonsbrough	(United Kingdom)	3:00.0	Q
7.	1	Eleonore Lehmann	(East Germany)	3:00.7	Q
8.	2	Vinka Jeričević	(Socialist Federal Republic of Yugoslavia)	3:01.0	Q
9.	2	Jacqueline Dyson	(United Kingdom)	3:01.7	
9.	1	Colette Gossens	(Belgium)	3:01.7	
11.	3	Christl Filippovits	(Austria)	3:02.8	
12.	3	Michele Pialat	(France)	3:07.0	
13.	1	Vera Kárpáti	(Hungary)	3:07.4	
14.	2	Réka Uzdi	(Hungary)	3:07.8	
15.	1	Elena Zennaro	(Italy)	3:08.9	
16.	1	Elżbieta Dobrzynska	(Poland)	3:12.7	

=== Final ===
Position	Line	Name	Nationality	Result	Other
Gold medal	4	Ada den Haan	(Netherlands)	2:52,0	ECR
Silver medal	7	Anita Lonsbrough	(United Kingdom)	2:53.5	
Bronze medal	5	Wiltrud Urselmann	(Germany)	2:53.8	
4.	6	Bärbel Walter	(East Germany)	2:55.5	
5.	3	Eve Maurer	Soviet Union	2:56.3	
6.	1	Eleonore Lehmann	(East Germany)	2:57.6	
7.	2	Alla Kovalenko	Soviet Union	2:59.0	
8.	8	Vinka Jeričević	(Socialist Federal Republic of Yugoslavia)	3:00.4	

== Sources ==
- IX. úszó, műugró és vízilabda Európa-bajnokság. Magyar Úszó Szövetség. 1958.
