= Diederichsen =

Diederichsen is a German surname. Notable people with the surname include:

- Angela Diederichsen (born 1950), German judge
- Diedrich Diederichsen (born 1957), German author, music journalist and cultural critic
- Helga Diederichsen (1930–2005), Mexican swimmer
