= Jytte =

Jytte is a feminine Danish given name. Notable people with the name include:

- Jytte Abildstrøm (1934–2025), Danish actress
- Jytte Hansen (1932–2015), Danish swimmer
- Jytte Hilden (born 1942), Danish chemical engineer and politician
- Jytte Klausen (born 1954), Danish academic
- Jytte Olsen, Danish beauty queen
