= Peter Heatly =

British diver

Sir Peter Heatly CBE DL
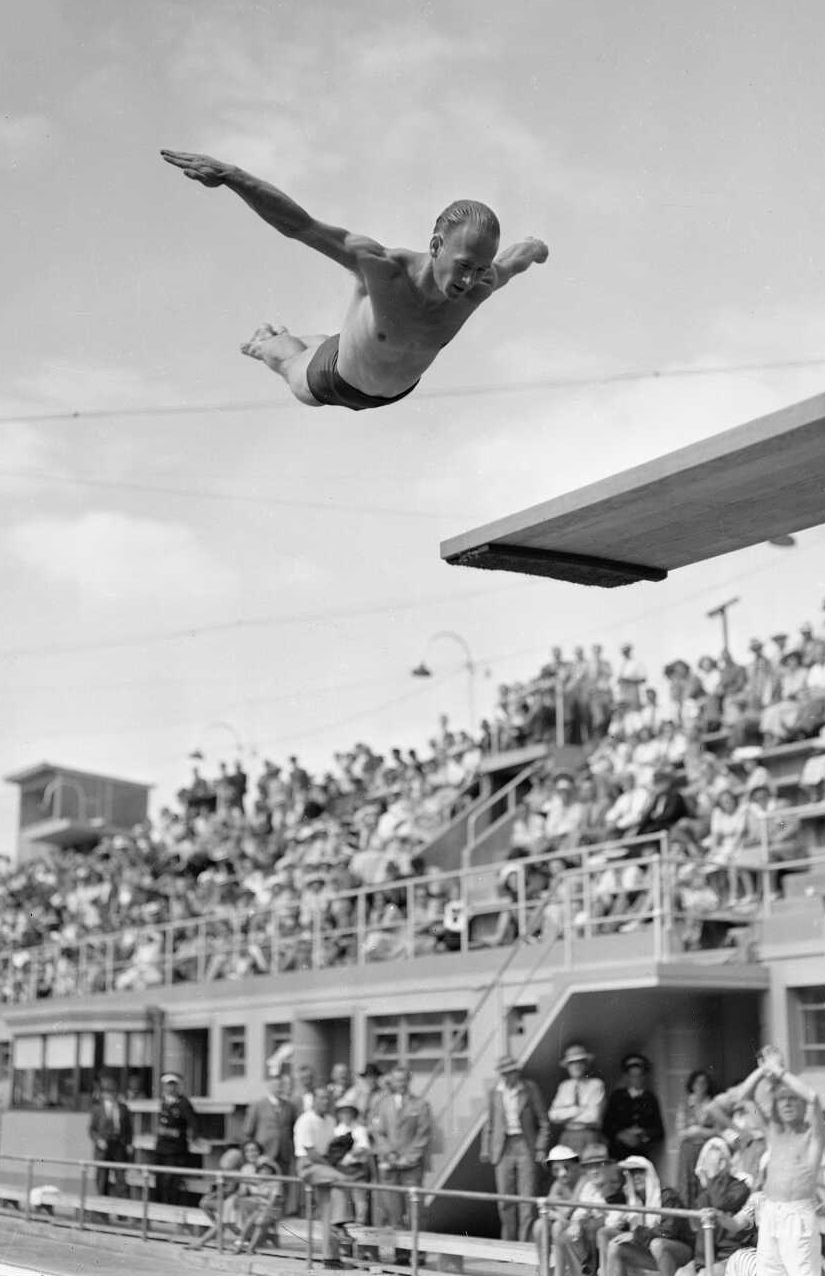
- Heatly at the 1950 British Empire Games

Personal information
- Born: 9 June 1924 Edinburgh, Scotland
- Died: 17 September 2015 (aged 91) Edinburgh, Scotland
- Education: University of Edinburgh
- Spouses: Jean Hermiston (m. 1948; died 1979) Mae Calder Cochrane (m. 1984; died 2003)

Sport
- Sport: Diving
Medal record
Representing Great Britain
European Championships
| Bronze medal – third place | 1954 Turin | 10 m platform |
Representing Scotland
British Empire Games
| Gold medal – first place | 1950 Auckland | 10 m platform |
| Gold medal – first place | 1954 Vancouver | 3 m springboard |
| Gold medal – first place | 1958 Cardiff | 10 m platform |
| Silver medal – second place | 1950 Auckland | 3 m springboard |
| Bronze medal – third place | 1954 Vancouver | 10 m platform |

Sir Peter Heatly, CBE DL (9 June 1924 – 17 September 2015) was a Scottish diver and Chairman of the Commonwealth Games Federation. He competed in the 3 m springboard and 10 m platform at the 1948 and 1952 Olympics, at the 1950, 1954 and 1958 British Empire Games, and at the 1954 European Championships. He won five British Empire Games medals and one European medal, while his best Olympic result was fifth place in 1948. Heatly was knighted in 1990, before being inducted into the Scottish Sports Hall of Fame in 2002, the Scottish Swimming Hall of Fame in 2010 and the International Swimming Hall of Fame in 2016.

== Early life ==
Born in Leith on Coburg Street, Heatly was educated at Leith Academy and began his diving career with Portobello Amateur Swimming Club (PASC). He was inspired to become a diver after watching Pete Desjardins dive at Port Seton. Heatly was eleven years old, and Desjardins asked to see him dive and gave him tips.

By the age of thirteen Heatly had become the East of Scotland Champion (1937), and he held this title until the outbreak of World War II in 1939. The outbreak of war put things on hold; however, Heatly became a record holder in the 440-yards and 880-yards during this time. Heatly studied engineering at the University of Edinburgh and continued to train with PASC.

Heatly wanted to enlist; however, as he was doing well with his studies at University, he was advised to join the Officers' Training Corps instead. When he graduated from University, he was commissioned into the Royal Engineers, but before he could be posted, the war ended. Heatly became an apprentice at Rosyth's Naval Dockyard; however, he kept up his training at the sports facilities nearby and became a Scottish Freestyle Champion in 1946, a title he kept until 1958.

Heatly married Jean Hermiston in 1948; he ran the family business of heating and ventilation, and a building and construction company while competing internationally and raising his four children.

== International competitions ==
At the 1948 Olympics, Heatly placed fifth in the platform and 13th in the springboard. At the 1950 British Empire Games in Auckland, New Zealand, he won a gold medal in the platform and a silver in the springboard. Heatly had been unable to practise for most of the five-week journey by ship to Auckland, except for one training session which took place in a U.S. base in Panama.

At the 1952 Olympics, Heatly placed 12th in the platform and 16th in the springboard. At the 1954 Commonwealth Games in Vancouver, Canada, he won a gold in the springboard and a bronze in the platform. The same year he won a bronze in the platform at the European championships.

At the 1958 Commonwealth Games in Cardiff, Wales, Heatley was appointed as captain and flagbearer for the Scotland Team. He won a gold medal in the platform, and retired from competitions after that.

== Later life ==
Heatly became the Chairman of Commonwealth Games Council for Scotland (now Commonwealth Games Scotland), in 1967–1971, Chairman of the Scottish Sports Council, (now sportscotland), in 1975–87, and Chairman of the Commonwealth Games Federation, in 1982–90. Heatly has a unique connection with the Commonwealth Games as he has consecutively attended seventeen games, from 1950 to 2014, in an official capacity as a competitor, organiser, Chairman of the Federation, as the Life Vice President of the Federation, team manager and Chef de Mission.

Heatly was also the President of Scottish Swimming on two separate occasions, Chairman of the British Swimming Federation, was a Councillor for the City of Edinburgh and was an integral part of the planning of the Royal Commonwealth Pool. He also served in many roles on both the European (LEN) and World (FINA) Technical Diving Committees from 1966 to 1988.

== Honours ==
Heatly was awarded a CBE in 1971 and was knighted in 1990, before being inducted into the Scottish Sports Hall of Fame in 2002, the Scottish Swimming Hall of Fame in 2010 and the International Swimming Hall of Fame in 2016. He was made Deputy Lieutenant of the City of Edinburgh in 1984, and held honorary degrees from the University of Edinburgh (1992) and St Margaret's College (1994).

== Personal life ==
Heatly had four children by his first wife Jean, who was also known as Bertha; she died in 1979. He remarried Mae Cochrane; she was also a widower with four children of her own. Together Peter and Mae had twenty grandchildren; Mae died in 2003.

Heatly was diagnosed with prostate cancer in the 1980s but lived with the disease for nearly thirty years before he died. His grandson James Heatly won a bronze medal in the 1 m springboard at the 2018 Commonwealth Games. James Heatly also won a gold medal in the 10 m mixed synchronised diving at the 2022 Commonwealth Games, partnered by Grace Reid
