= Havrysh =

Havrysh is a surname. Notable people with the surname include:

- Mariya Havrysh (1931–2001), Ukrainian swimmer
- Stepan Havrysh (born 1952), Ukrainian politician
- Vitaliy Havrysh (born 1986), Ukrainian footballer
