= Riach =

Riach is a Scottish surname. Notable people with the surname include:

- Alan Riach (born 1957), Scottish poet and academic
- Nancy Riach (1927–1947), Scottish swimmer
- Ralph Riach (1936–2022), Scottish actor
