= Kazuko Sakamoto =

Japanese swimmer (born 1935)

Personal information
- Born: 4 September 1935 (age 90)

Sport
- Sport: Swimming
Medal record
Women's swimming
Representing Japan
Asian Games
Silver medal – second place	1954 Manila	200 m breaststroke

Kazuko Sakamoto (坂本 和子, Sakamoto Kazuko; born 4 September 1935) is a Japanese former swimmer. She competed in the women's 200 metre breaststroke at the 1952 Summer Olympics.
