= Jannie de Groot =

Dutch swimmer (1930–2011)

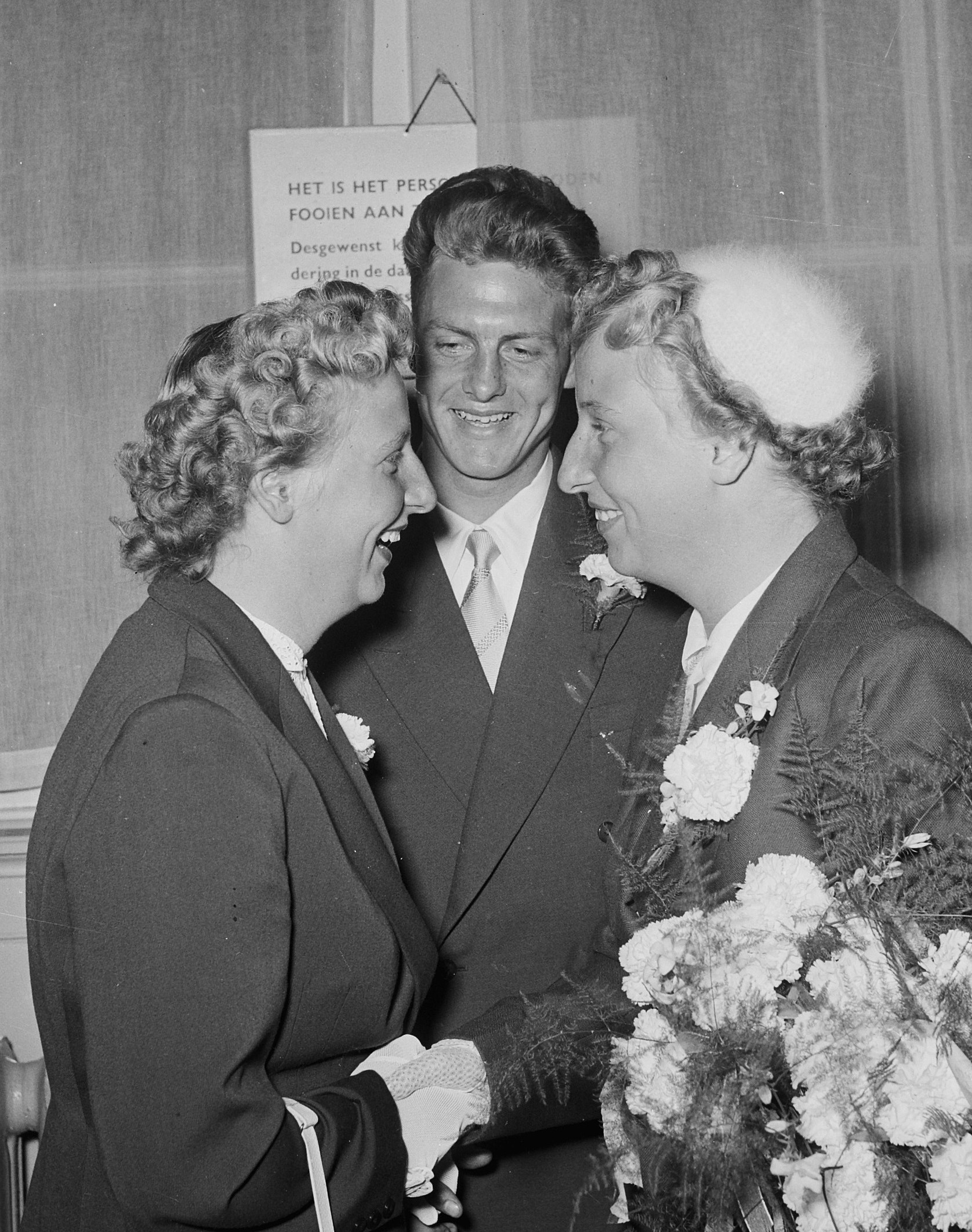
- Marriage of Annie de Groot and Mr. Smits in 1953; Jannie congratulates her twin sister Annie.

Personal information
- Born: 4 January 1930 Amsterdam, Netherlands
- Died: 27 July 2011 (aged 81) Amsterdam, Netherlands
Medal record
Women's swimming
Representing the Netherlands
European Championships
Bronze medal – third place	1947 Monte Carlo	200 m breaststroke
Bronze medal – third place	1950 Vienna	200 m breaststroke

Adriana Elisabeth "Jannie/Janny" de Groot (4 January 1930 – 27 July 2011) was a Dutch swimmer. In 1947 and 1950 she won the national titles and became third in the 200 m breaststroke at the European Aquatics Championships. She competed in the same event at the 1948 Summer Olympics and finished fifth in the final won by Dutch teammate Nel van Vliet. Jannie's brother, Daan de Groot (1933–1982), was an Olympic cyclist.
