= Colette Goossens =

Belgian swimmer

Personal information
- Born: 2 June 1942 (age 84) Roubaix, France

Sport
- Sport: Swimming

Colette Goossens (born 2 June 1942) is a Belgian former swimmer. She competed in the women's 200 metre breaststroke at the 1956 Summer Olympics.
