= Eva-Maria ten Elsen =

German swimmer

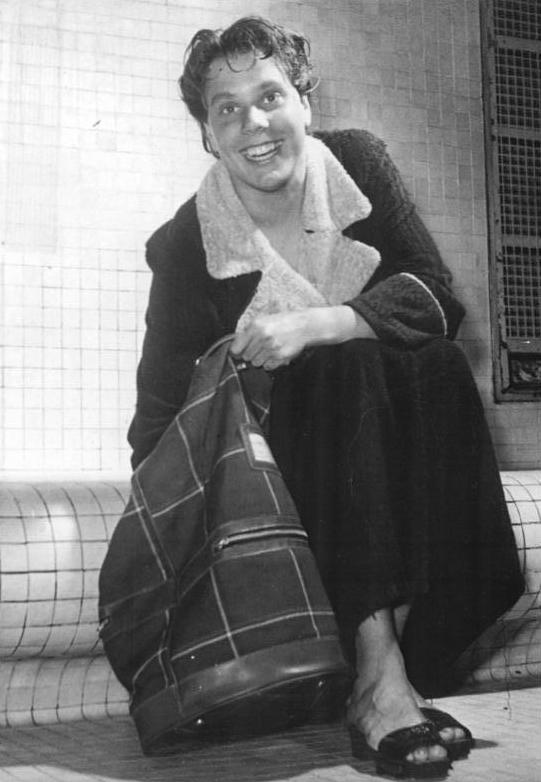
- Eva-Maria ten Elsen in 1956

Personal information
- Born: 14 September 1937 (age 88) Altenburg, Germany

Sport
- Sport: Swimming
- Club: SC Rotation Leipzig
Medal record
Representing Germany
Olympic Games
Bronze medal – third place	1956 Melbourne	200 m breaststroke

Eva-Maria ten Elsen (later Hartmann, born 14 September 1937) is a German former swimmer who won a bronze medal in the 200 m breaststroke event at the 1956 Summer Olympics.

She failed to qualify for the 1960 Olympics, and in 1961 retired from swimming. After graduating in 1966 from the German University of Physical Education (DHfK) in Leipzig she worked for several years as a swimming coach. From 1971 to 1990 she was employed by the sporting goods company Expovita. After the German reunification, she worked in the real estate and public health insurance areas.
