= Della Sehorn =

American swimmer (1927–2001)

Personal information
- Full name: Idella Thrasher Sehorn
- Nickname: "Della"
- National team: United States
- Born: May 28, 1927 Portland, Oregon, U.S.
- Died: March 14, 2001 (aged 73) Los Altos, California, U.S.

Sport
- Sport: Swimming
- Strokes: Breaststroke
- Club: Columbia Athletic Club

Idella Thrasher Sehorn (May 28, 1927 – March 14, 2001), née Idella Thrasher, was an American competition swimmer.

Sehorn was born in Portland, Oregon, and she grew up in Oregon City. She began swimming at a young age at the Columbia Athletic Club in Portland. Following World War II, she married her coach, Al Sehorn, and began to set records in her best event, the breaststroke. From 1950 to 1953, she set 18 American records in the event.

Sehorn represented the United States at the 1952 Summer Olympics in Helsinki, Finland, where, at the age of 25, she was the oldest female member the U.S. swim team. She competed in the preliminary heats of the women's 200-meter breaststroke, posting a time of 3:13.7.

Upon her return to Portland, Sehorn was honored as the first woman to receive the Bill Hayward Award, given to Oregon's top amateur athlete. In 1953, she set three U.S. records in a single day. Sehorn retired from competitive swimming in 1953 to raise her three children and coach swimming in Portland, and later in Los Altos, California. In the 1970s, she began masters swimming, winning several masters swimming awards. She was inducted into the Oregon Sports Hall of Fame in 1991.

In 2000, she was diagnosed with lung cancer, and died in Los Altos in 2001.
