= Yvonne Vandekerckhove =

Belgian swimmer

Personal information
- Born: 12 November 1920 Ostend, Belgium
- Died: 13 November 2012 (aged 92) Ostend, Belgium

Sport
- Sport: Swimming

Yvonne Vandekerckhove (12 November 1920 – 13 November 2012) was a Belgian swimmer. She competed in the women's 200 metre breaststroke at the 1948 Summer Olympics.
