= Vera Kostina =

Soviet swimmer

Personal information
- Born: 1932 (age 93–94)

Sport
- Sport: Swimming

Vera Kostina (born 1932) is a Soviet former swimmer. She competed in the women's 200 metre breaststroke at the 1952 Summer Olympics.
