= Þórdís Árnadóttir =

Icelandic swimmer

Personal information
- Born: 19 September 1933
- Died: 6 November 2013 (aged 80)

Sport
- Sport: Swimming

Þórdís Árnadóttir (19 September 1933 – 6 November 2013) was an Icelandic swimmer. She competed in the women's 200 metre breaststroke at the 1948 Summer Olympics.
