= Clara LaMore =

American swimmer (1926–2021)

Clara LaMore -Walker
- LaMore at 22, in 1948 U.S. Olympic blazer and beret with Olympiad shield in front

Personal information
- Full name: Catherine Clara A. LaMore
- National team: United States
- Born: July 2, 1926 Providence, Rhode Island, U.S.
- Died: April 2, 2021 (aged 94) North Smithfield, Rhode Island, U.S.
- Education: Providence College (B.A. M.A.)
- Spouses: Captain Donald Walker, USN

Sport
- Sport: Swimming
- Strokes: Breaststroke, freestyle, backstroke
- Club: Olneyville Boys' Club
- Coach: Joe Watmough; John O'Neill (Providence College); Ray Daughters (48 Olympics)

Catherine Clara A. LaMore (July 2, 1926 – April 2, 2021), also known by her married name Clara Lamore Walker, was an American competition swimmer who represented the United States at the 1948 Summer Olympics in London. LaMore competed in the preliminary heats of the women's 200-meter breaststroke and recorded a time of 3:23.6.

== Early life ==
LaMore was born July 2, 1926 in Providence, Rhode, Island, the daughter of Raymond P. LaMore, a U.S. postman and Irene A. Martellucci LaMore. She attended Central High School of Providence where she was an outstanding student. Clara learned to swim in 1941, and during her early career was trained by her mother Irene. From an early age, she trained and competed for the Olneyville Boys' Club of Providence, and thrived and advanced in her skills under the coaching of Joe Watmough. In high school era swimming honors, she was twice an Athlete of the year for all of New England, and earned multi-year All-American honors.

Summarizing her best known achievements in swimming, LaMore won the AAU breaststroke titles over 200 m (outdoor, 1945), 100 yd (indoor, 1947), and 220 yd (indoor, 1948).

At the July, 1948, American Olympic swimming trials in Detroit, Michigan, she placed third in the 200-meter breastroke with a time of 3:16.9, behind Jeanne Wilson of Chicago, and Carol Pence of St. Louis. LaMore's third place finish qualified her for a place on the U.S. Women's Olympic team as the first three finishers made the team that year.

== 1948 London Olympics ==
LaMore participated in the 1948 London Olympics, under Hall of Fame Coach Ray Daughters. She competed in the preliminaries of the 200-meter breaststroke, where she placed nineteenth with a time of 3:23.6, and did not advance beyond the first preliminary round. She semi-retired from swimming after the 1948 Olympics.

=== Education and career ===
After the Olympics, LaMore worked for New England Telephone, then would become a nun, in The Sisters of the Cenacle. Pursuing higher education, she was one of the first two women to graduate from Providence College, initially an all Male Catholic School, where she earned a degree in Philosophy. She completed a Bachelors in Secondary Special Education from the school in 1973. In 1978, having returned to the school after beginning her career in education, she earned a Masters in Education, specializing in Counseling and Administration. While training as a master's swimmer she swam for Providence College Coach John O'Neill, who considered her, "one of the most focused athletes I have ever worked with". She later taught English at Cranston West High, and was a guidance counselor at Western Hills Middle School in Cranston, Rhode Island.

In the 1960's, she married Naval officer Doneal P. Walker, who she met while at Providence College. Walker would obtain the rank of Captain in the Navy, and for seven years the couple lived together in Europe until his sudden death in 1970.

=== U.S. Masters Swimming ===
Having retired from swimming years earlier after the London Olympics, around 1980 she developed chronic back pain and resumed swimming upon advice from a doctor. She became the most decorated Masters swimmer of all time, setting more than 180 world and 465 American records. She was selected the Outstanding Masters Swimmer in her age group for eight consecutive years. With an exceptional history as a United States Masters Swimmer, she set a 50-yard breaststroke master's age group record in her first Master's meet.

Walker died at age 94 while at a facility for assisted living at Rhode Island's town of North Smithfield on April 2, 2021. Her death was attributed to natural causes. A Mass in her honor was held on April 9 at the Church of Immaculate Conception in Cranston, Rhode Island, and she was interred at St. Anne Cemetery. She had no children.

=== Honors ===
Lamore Walker was inducted into the prestigious International Swimming Hall of Fame 1995, and the Rhode Island Heritage Hall of Fame in 1968, and the Rhode Island Aquatic Hall of Fame.

== See also ==
- List of members of the International Swimming Hall of Fame
