= Kaija Mäkelä =

Finnish swimmer (1930–2023)

Personal information
- Born: 23 October 1930 Kalvola, Finland
- Died: 16 November 2023 (aged 93)

Sport
- Sport: Swimming

Kaija Mäkelä (23 October 1930 – 16 November 2023) was a Finnish swimmer. She competed in the women's 200 metre breaststroke at the 1952 Summer Olympics. Mäkelä died on 16 November 2023, at the age of 93.
