= Ria Tobing =

Indonesian swimmer

Personal information
- Born: 1938
- Died: 2017 (aged 78–79)

Sport
- Sport: Swimming
Medal record
Women's swimming
Representing Indonesia
Asian Games
Bronze medal – third place	1958 Tokyo	100 m breaststroke

Ria Tobing (1938–2017) was an Indonesian swimmer. She competed in the women's 200 metre breaststroke at the 1956 Summer Olympics. She was the first woman to represent Indonesia at the Olympics.
