= Gail Peters =

American swimmer

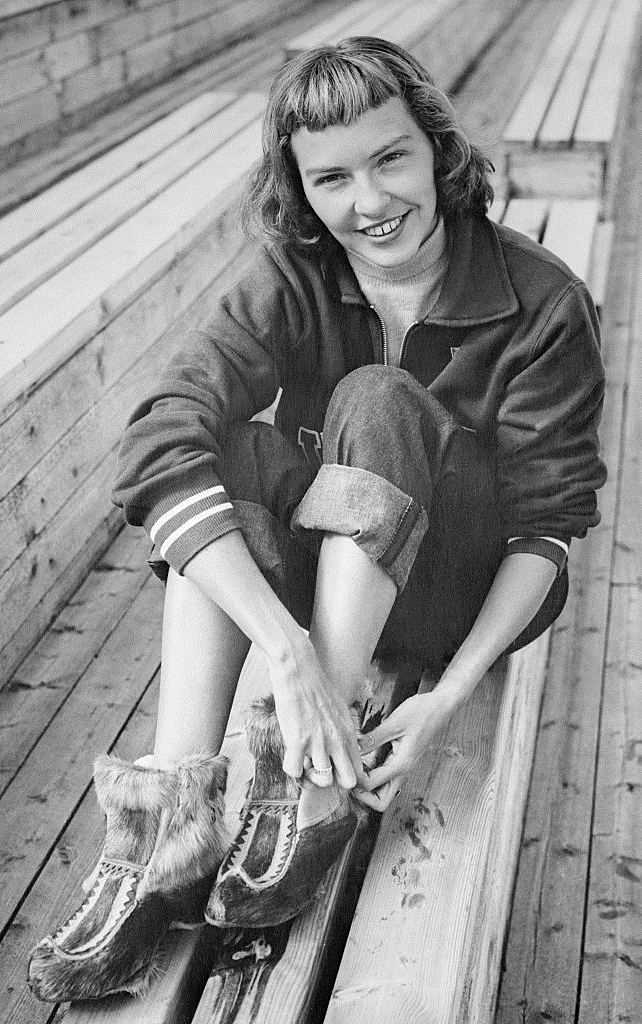
- Peters in 1952

Personal information
- Full name: Gail Peters
- National team: United States
- Born: June 23, 1929 (age 97) Trenton, New Jersey, U.S.

Sport
- Sport: Swimming
- Strokes: Breaststroke
- Club: Walter Reed Swim Club

Gail Peters (born June 23, 1929), also known by her married name Gail Roper, is an American former competition swimmer who represented the United States at the 1952 Summer Olympics in Helsinki. Peters swam in the qualifying heats of the 200-meter breaststroke and finished with a time of 3:13.3.

== Biography ==
Raised in Trenton, New Jersey, Peters was a state champion swimmer while at Trenton Central High School, where she graduated in 1947. In 1951, she moved to Washington, D.C., where she work as a military geology draftsman and joined the Walter Reed Swim Club. In 1953, she won the AAU outdoor titles in the 110 and 220 yard breaststroke, 330 yard individual medley, and 4×220 yard freestyle and medley relays. She also won the AAU indoors titles in the 100 and 200 yard breaststroke and 300 yard medley in 1952, and in the 100 and 250 yard breaststroke in 1953.

Peters semi-retired from swimming for 18 years to raise children. She returned as a masters swimmer in 1973 and competed until 1986, when she was diagnosed with spinal stenosis. In the late 1980s she coached at a swim club in San Francisco. She resumed competing in 1991. During her masters career she won 30 world and 135 national titles and set 42 world and 650 national records. Later worked as a marine biologist for the Pacific States Marine Commission, living among California, Hawaii and Japan. In 1997 she was inducted into the International Swimming Hall of Fame.
