= Jeanne Wilson (swimmer) =

American swimmer (1926–2018)

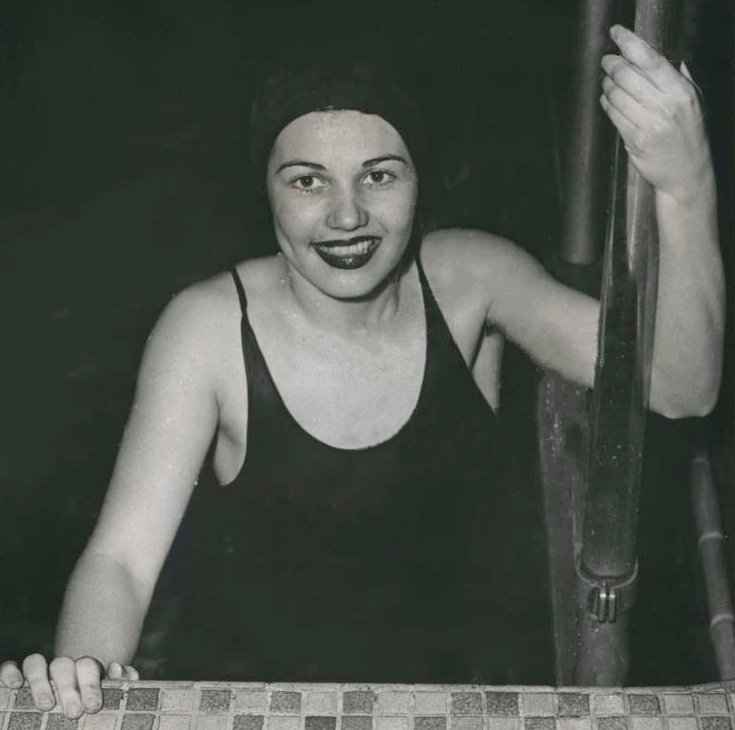
- Wilson in 1945 after breaking the U.S. 100 yd breaststroke record

Personal information
- Full name: Jeanne Elizabeth Wilson
- National team: United States
- Born: February 18, 1926 Chicago, Illinois, U.S.
- Died: April 18, 2018 (aged 92) Lafayette, Indiana, U.S.

Sport
- Sport: Swimming
- Strokes: Breaststroke
- Club: Lake Shore Athletic Club

Jeanne Elizabeth Wilson (February 18, 1926 – April 18, 2018) was an American competition swimmer who represented the United States at the 1948 Summer Olympics in London. She competed in the preliminary heats of the 200-meter breaststroke, recording a time of 3:18.3.

In June 1949, Wilson married Jack Vaughn and changed her last name to Vaughan.
