= Ursula Happe =

German swimmer (1926–2021)

Personal information
- Born: 20 October 1926 Free City of Danzig
- Died: 26 March 2021 (aged 94) Dortmund, Germany

Sport
- Sport: Swimming
Medal record
Representing Germany
Women's swimming
Olympic Games
Gold medal – first place	1956 Melbourne	200 m breaststroke
European Championships (LC)
Gold medal – first place	1954 Turin	200 m breaststroke
Bronze medal – third place	1954 Turin	100 m butterfly

Ursula Happe (German pronunciation: [ˈʊʁzula ˈhapə]; 20 October 1926 – 26 March 2021) was a German swimmer and Olympic champion. She competed at the 1956 Olympic Games in Melbourne, where she won the gold medal in 200 m breaststroke. She also competed in the women's 200 metre breaststroke at the 1952 Summer Olympics. Happe died in Dortmund on 26 March 2021 at the age of 94.

Her son Thomas Happe is a former international handball player for West Germany.

== See also ==
- List of members of the International Swimming Hall of Fame
