= Jacqueline Bertrand =

French swimmer (1929–2012)

Personal information
- Full name: Jacqueline Renée Bertrand
- Born: 10 June 1929 Paris, France
- Died: 17 June 2012 (aged 83) Agen, France

Sport
- Sport: Swimming

Jacqueline Renée Bertrand (10 June 1929 – 17 June 2012) was a French swimmer. She competed in the women's 200 metre breaststroke at the 1948 Summer Olympics. Bertrand died in Agen on 17 June 2012, at the age of 83.
