= Kirsten Hedegaard Jensen =

Danish swimmer

Personal information
- Born: 23 February 1935 Frederiksberg, Denmark
- Died: 24 September 2006 (aged 71)

Sport
- Sport: Swimming

Kirsten Hedegaard Jensen (23 February 1935 – 24 September 2006) was a Danish swimmer. She competed in the women's 200 metre breaststroke at the 1952 Summer Olympics.
