= Margit Leskinen =

Finnish swimmer

Personal information
- Born: 19 February 1915 Vaasa, Grand Duchy of Finland
- Died: 7 April 2002 (aged 87) Helsinki, Finland

Sport
- Sport: Swimming

Margit Leskinen (nee Hietamäki, 19 February 1915 – 7 April 2002) was a Finnish swimmer. She competed in the women's 200 metre breaststroke at the 1948 Summer Olympics.

Leskinen was married to the politician Väinö Leskinen who was also known as a talented swimmer.
