= Eileen Ward Petersen =

Danish swimmer

Personal information
- Born: 15 July 1937 (age 88) Copenhagen, Denmark

Sport
- Sport: Swimming

Eileen Ward Petersen (born 15 July 1937) is a Danish former swimmer. She competed in the women's 200 metre breaststroke at the 1952 Summer Olympics.
