= Jean Wrigley =

British swimmer

Personal information
- Born: 22 December 1935 (age 90)

Sport
- Sport: Swimming

Jean Wrigley (born 22 December 1935) is a British former swimmer. She competed in the women's 200 metre breaststroke at the 1952 Summer Olympics.
