= Anna Ólafsdóttir =

Icelandic swimmer

Personal information
- Born: 2 September 1932
- Died: 21 January 2013 (aged 80) Reykjavík, Iceland

Sport
- Sport: Swimming

Anna Ólafsdóttir (2 September 1932 – 21 January 2013) was an Icelandic swimmer. She competed in the women's 200 metre breaststroke at the 1948 Summer Olympics and was the first woman to represent Iceland at the Olympics. During her athletic career, she set several national records in swimming.
