= Jean Caplin =

British swimmer

Personal information
- Born: Jean Marguerite von Cassano; 21 February 1930 Kingston-upon-Thames, England
- Died: 1 March 2014 (aged 84) Kingston-upon-Thames, England

Sport
- Sport: Swimming

Jean Marguerite Caplin (21 February 1930 – 1 March 2014) was a British swimmer. She competed in the women's 200 metre breaststroke at the 1948 Summer Olympics.

Caplin was born to a wealthy German family, but was fostered in Brighton in the 1930s. She began swimming at the age of seven. When she was fifteen, she won the 1946 ASA 200 yards breaststroke title and went on to compete in the 1948 Summer Olympics. She finished third in the ASA 200 in 1949, and also won the Southern Counties 100 in 1949 and 1950. She began suffering from mental health issues in 1951. She hitchhiked from France to Helsinki to spectate the 1952 Summer Olympics.

After returning from Helsinki, Caplin began committing petty theft. In 1952, she was sentenced to two consecutive six-month prison sentences on thirteen counts of theft, but her sentence was commuted on appeal. She served two years on probation and one year in a psychiatric hospital.

She began involved in swimming again in the 1980s and competed in the Sussex Masters Championships. She died from cancer in 2014 in Richmond, London.
