= John Cattanach (shinty) =

Scottish shinty player

Dr. John Cattanach (1885–1915) was a shinty player for Newtonmore in the 1900s. He was the first shinty player inducted into the Scottish Sports Hall of Fame

== Biography ==
Cattanach is considered one the outstanding shinty players in history. He scored eight goals in an 11 – 3 victory for Newtonmore over Furnace in the Camanachd Cup Final of 1909, this record still stands. Cattanach was also capped for his country at hockey and athletics. He was also a qualified medic, graduating from the University of Edinburgh in 1912. Cattanach served in the Royal Army Medical Corps, Warwickshire Regiment, becoming a Lieutenant in 1914. He died in 1915 during the First World War at Gallipoli.

He was posthumously inducted into the Scottish Sports Hall of Fame in 2002 and was the only shinty player honoured in this was until Ronald Ross was inducted in 2023.
