= Scottish Sports Hall of Fame =

The Scottish Sports Hall of Fame is the national sports hall of fame of Scotland, set up in 2002. It is a joint project organised by sportscotland, the national governmental body for Scottish sport, and National Museums Scotland. It is also funded by BBC Scotland and donations from the general public. The founding patrons were Anne, Princess Royal, a notable supporter of the Scotland national rugby union team; First Minister Jack McConnell; and Formula One triple world champion Jackie Stewart.

== Inductees ==
As of 2023, there have been ten rounds of inductions into the Hall of Fame:

1. 2002: initial 50 inductees.
2. 2003: 14 inductees.
3. 2004: 6 inductees.
4. 2007: 8 inductees.
5. 2008: 4 inductees.
6. 2010: 6 inductees.
7. 2012: 6 inductees.
8. 2015: 5 inductees.
9. 2022: 1 inductee.
10. 2023: 2 inductees.
11. 2024: 3 inductees.

=== Athletics and Highland games ===
- Bill Anderson (1937-2019)
- Donald Dinnie (1837–1916)
- Wyndham Halswelle (1882–1915)
- Eric Liddell (1902–1945)
- Liz McColgan (born 1964)
- George McNeill (born 1947)
- Yvonne Murray (born 1964)
- Arthur James Robertson (1879–1957)
- Ian Stewart (born 1949)
- Lachie Stewart (born 1943)
- Allan Wells (born 1952)

=== Baseball ===
- Bobby Thomson (1923–2010)

=== Bowls ===
- Richard Corsie (born 1966)
- Willie Wood (born 1938)

=== Boxing ===
- Ken Buchanan (1945–2023)
- Benny Lynch (1913–1946)
- Walter McGowan (1942–2016)
- Dick McTaggart (1935–2025)
- Jackie Paterson (1920–1966)
- Jim Watt (born 1948)

=== Cricket ===
- Mike Denness (1940–2013)

=== Curling ===
- Rhona Martin (born 1966)

=== Cycling ===
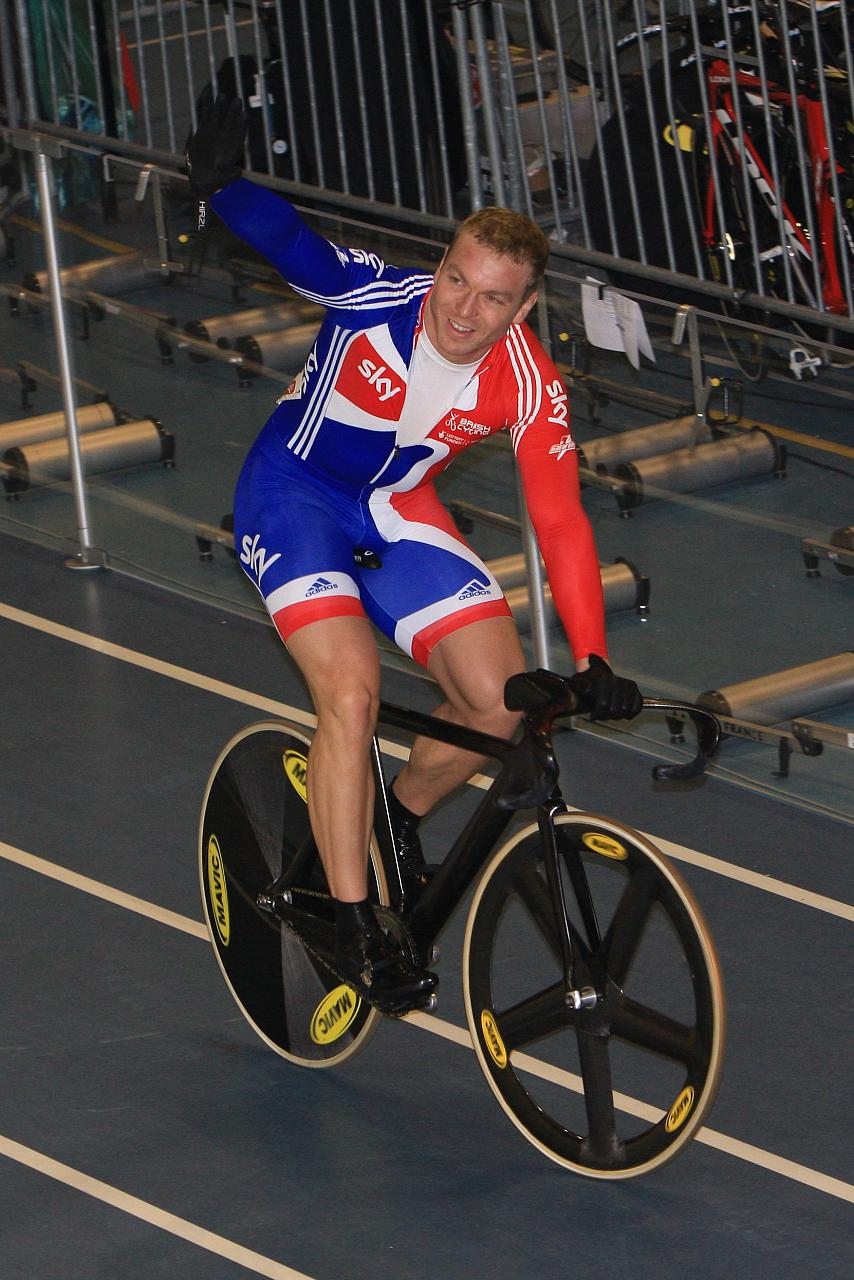
Chris Hoy is a six-time Olympic gold medalist and an eleven-time world champion

- Chris Hoy (born 1976)
- Robert Millar (born 1958)
- Graeme Obree (born 1965)

=== Diving ===
- Peter Heatly (1924–2015)

=== Equestrianism ===
- Ian Stark (born 1954)

=== Football ===
- Jim Baxter (1939–2001)
- Billy Bremner (1942–1997)
- Matt Busby (1909–1994)
- Kenny Dalglish (born 1951)
- Julie Fleeting (born 1980)
- Archie Gemmill (born 1947)
- John Greig (born 1942)
- Jimmy Johnstone (1944–2006)
- Denis Law (1940–2025)
- Ally McCoist (born 1962)
- Jimmy McGrory (1904–1982)
- Billy McNeill (1940–2019)
- Rose Reilly (born 1955)
- Bill Shankly (1913–1981)
- Gordon Smith (1924–2004)
- Jock Stein (1922–1985)

=== Golf ===
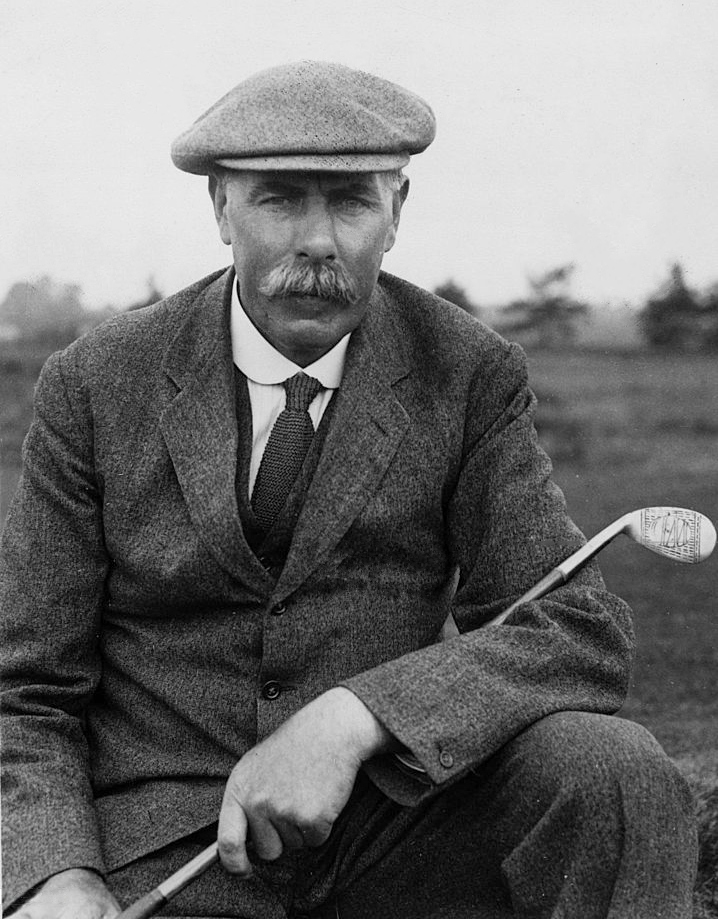
James Braid (golfer), five times The Open Champion

- Willie Anderson (1879–1910)
- Tommy Armour (1895–1968)
- James Braid (1870–1950)
- Sandy Lyle (born 1958)
- Colin Montgomerie (born 1963)
- Old Tom Morris (1821–1908)
- Young Tom Morris (1851–1875)
- Belle Robertson (born 1936)
- Jessie Valentine (1915–2006)

=== Horse racing ===
- Willie Carson (born 1942)

=== Judo ===
- George Kerr (born 1937)
- Graeme Randall (born 1975)

=== Motorsport ===
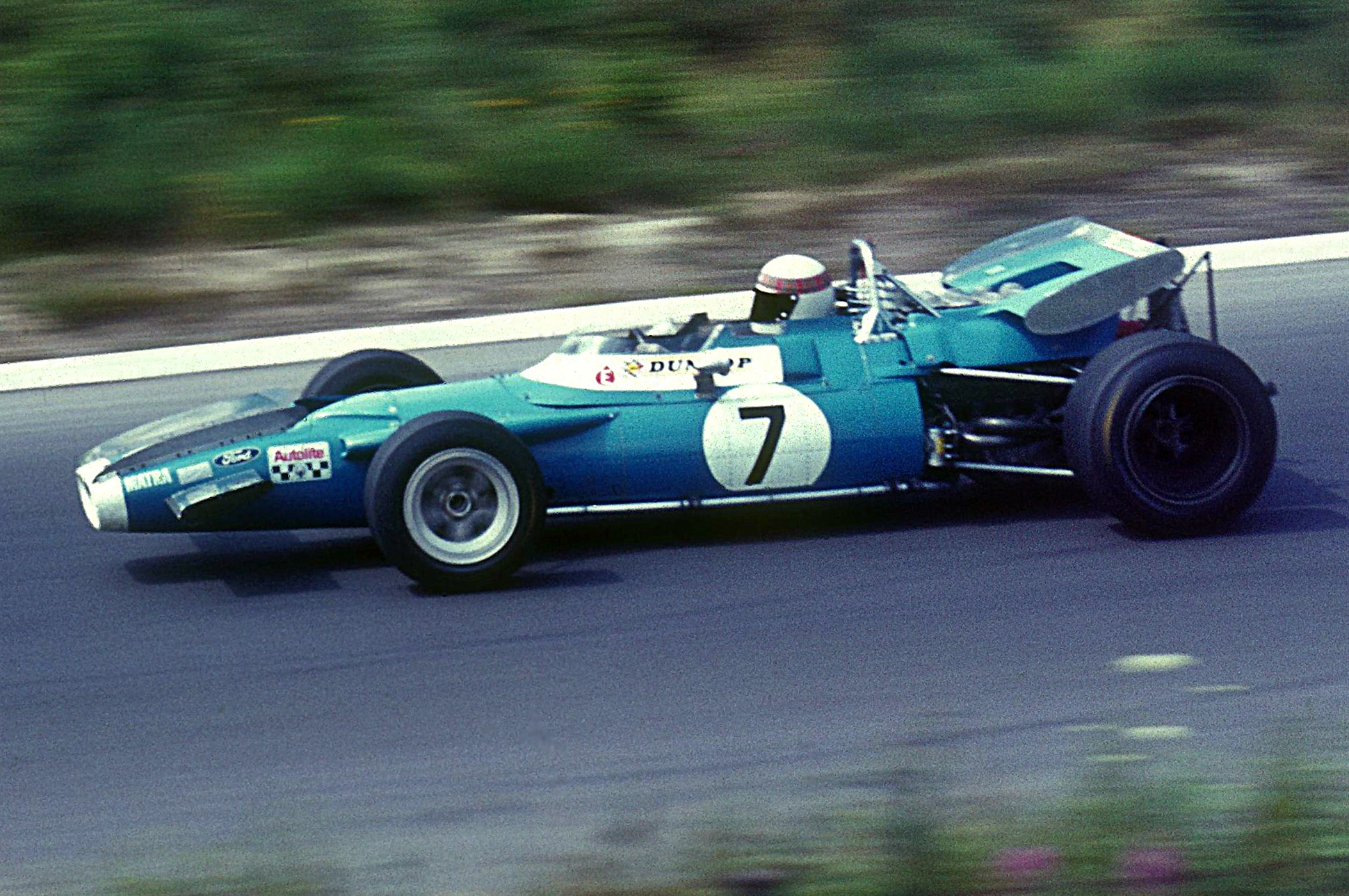
Jackie Stewart, 'The Flying Scot', at the Nürburgring in Germany with the Matra–Cosworth that took him to the Formula One World Championship title in 1969

- Louise Aitken-Walker (born 1960)
- Jim Clark (1936–1968)
- Dario Franchitti (born 1973)
- Jimmie Guthrie (1897–1937)
- Steve Hislop (1962–2003)
- Bob McIntyre (1928–1962)
- Colin McRae (1968–2007)
- Jackie Stewart (born 1939)

=== Mountaineering and hillwalking ===
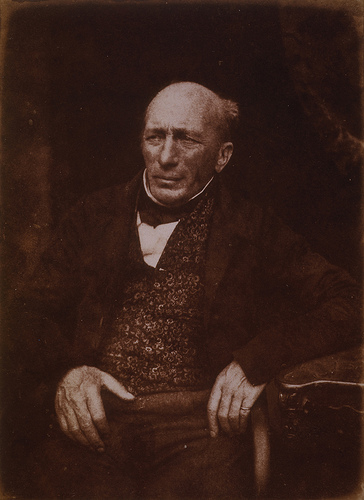
Captain Robert Barclay-Allardyce, the Celebrated Pedestrian, by Hill & Adamson.

- Robert Barclay Allardice (1779–1854)
- Dougal Haston (1940–1977)
- Hamish MacInnes (1930–2020)

=== Rowing ===
- Katherine Grainger (born 1975)
- Wally Kinnear (1880–1974)

=== Rugby union ===
- Finlay Calder (born 1957)
- Douglas Elliot (1923–2005)
- Gavin Hastings (born 1962)
- Andy Irvine (born 1951)
- George MacPherson (1903–1981)
- Ian McGeechan (born 1946)
- Mark Morrison (1878–1945)
- Ken Scotland (1936-2023)
- David Sole (born 1962)
- Robert Wilson Shaw (1913–1979)

=== Sailing ===
- Chay Blyth (born 1940)
- Shirley Robertson (born 1968)

=== Shinty ===
- John Cattanach (1885–1915)
- Ronald Ross (born 1975)

=== Shooting ===
- Alister Allan (born 1944)
- Shirley McIntosh (born 1965)

=== Swimming ===
- Jim Anderson (born 1963)
- Ian Black (born 1941)
- Kenny Cairns (born 1957)
- Catherine Gibson (1931–2013)
- Elenor Gordon (1933–2014)
- Ellen King (1909–1994)
- Margaret McEleny (born 1965)
- Bob McGregor (born 1944)
- Belle Moore (1894–1975)
- Nancy Riach (1927–1947)
- Jack Wardrop (born 1932)
- David Wilkie (1954-2024)

=== Table tennis ===
- Helen Elliot (1927–2013)

=== Tennis ===
- Winnie Shaw (1947–1992)

=== Water polo ===
- George Cornet (1877–1952)

=== Weightlifting ===
- John McNiven (1935–2024)

=== Multiple sports ===
- Leslie Balfour-Melville (1854–1937), cricket, rugby union, tennis and golf
- Launceston Elliot (1874–1930), weightlifting and wrestling
- Isabel Newstead (1955–2007), 18 Paralympic medals in swimming, athletics and shooting.
- Kenneth Grant MacLeod (1888–1967), rugby union, cricket, football, athletics and golf

=== Former members ===
- Rodney Pattisson (born 1943), sailing, removed in 2012 upon request.

== See also ==
- Sport in Scotland
