= Nancy Riach =

Scottish swimmer (1927–1947)

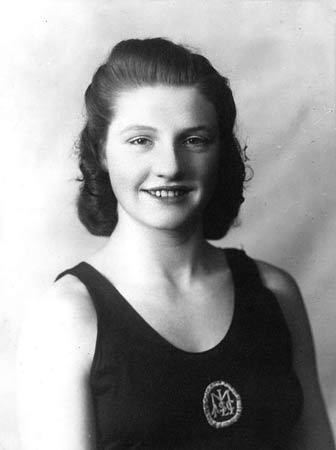

Personal information
- Born: 6 April 1927 Motherwell, Scotland
- Died: 15 September 1947 (aged 20)

Sport
- Sport: Swimming
Medal record
Representing Great Britain
European Championships (LC)
Bronze medal – third place	1947 Monte Carlo	4×100 m freestyle

Nancy Anderson Long Riach (6 April 1927 – 15 September 1947) was a Scottish swimmer who in 1945 held 28 British and Scottish records in various swimming disciplines.

== Biography ==
Riach was born in Motherwell on 6 April 1927 to Agnes Nicol White, a primary school teacher, and Charles Fraser Riach a police constable and later inspector. She went to Dalziel High School and trained to become a teacher and was employed by Lanarkshire education authority.

Riach was a member of the Motherwell Amateur Swimming and Water Polo Club based at the local corporation baths. Her coach at the club was David Crabb. She won her first championship in 1938, broke her first Scottish record at the age of 15 and by 1945 held 28 Scottish and British records. She won the 1946 and 1947 ASA National Championship 110 yards freestyle title, the 1946 National Championship 220 yards freestyle title and the 1946 National Championship 440 yards freestyle title. She was successful in freestyle, breaststroke and backstroke. She won the 100 metres freestyle title in the World Student Games in Paris in the summer of 1947.

Riach regularly attended church and sang in the choir. Due to her religious convictions, she refused to compete in swimming tournaments on Sundays.

While competing at the European Swimming Championships in Monte Carlo she contracted polio. Against doctors' advice she continued to race and was pulled unconscious from the pool at the end of the 100 yards freestyle event. She never regained consciousness. She died on the morning of 15 September 1947 before her parents arrived from Scotland. Riach was buried, in her swimming costume, in Airdrie on 20 September 1947. It was estimated more than 10,000 people attended the funeral processions to New Monkland Cemetery.

Riach was considered to be one of the greatest swimmers of her generation. On her death The United Nations Swimming Committee chairman, S.T. Hurst, said of her 'She was undoubtedly the finest swimmer the British Empire has ever produced. Nancy Riach has been the finest ambassador of sport that Scotland or any other country within the British Empire has ever turned out.'

She was inducted into the Scottish Sports Hall of Fame in 2002, and into the Scottish Swimming Hall of Fame in 2010.

In 1949 the Scottish Amateur Swimming Association established The Nancy Riach Memorial Medal. The medal is awarded annually to the person who has done the most to enhance or uphold the prestige of Scottish swimming in any of its disciplines.
