= George Cornet =

Scottish water polo player

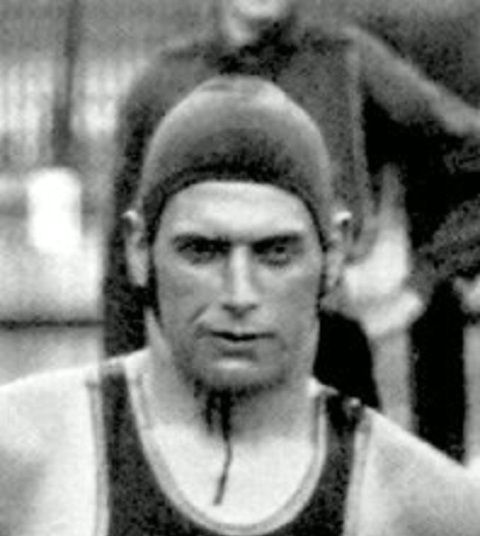
- Cornet in 1912

Personal information
- Born: 15 July 1877 Inverness, Scotland
- Died: 22 April 1952 (aged 74) Rainhill, England

Sport
- Sport: Water polo
Medal record
Representing Great Britain
Olympic Games
Gold medal – first place	1908 London	Team competition
Gold medal – first place	1912 Stockholm	Team competition

George Thomson Cornet (15 July 1877 – 22 April 1952) was a Scottish sportsman. He was the only Scottish person in the Great Britain water polo team that won gold in the 1908 Summer Olympics and the 1912 Summer Olympics. He was born in Inverness and died in Rainhill.

He played as a back for the Inverness Amateurs team that won the Scottish Championship in 1909 and reached four other finals; Cornet represented Scotland a total of 17 times between 1897 and 1912. Cornet also played football and cricket for Inverness teams as well as competing in heavy and track athletics events.

Cornet was inducted into the Scottish Sports Hall of Fame on 12 March 2007.

== See also ==
- Great Britain men's Olympic water polo team records and statistics
- List of Olympic champions in men's water polo
- List of Olympic medalists in water polo (men)
