= Judy Cornell =

American swimmer (1933–2021)

Personal information
- Full name: Judy May Cornell -DeRego
- National team: United States
- Born: March 28, 1933 Portland, Oregon, U.S.
- Died: January 4, 2021 (aged 87) Hillsboro, Oregon
- Occupation: Swim Coach
- Spouse: Daniel DeRego (1955)

Sport
- Sport: Swimming
- Event: 100, 200 breaststroke
- Strokes: Breaststroke
- Club: Portland Multinomah Club; Portland Jaycees
- Coach: Jack Cody (Multinomah Club); Nancy Merki Lees; Richard O. Papenguth (Olympics)

Julia "Judy" May Cornell (March 28, 1933 – January 4, 2021), also known by her married name Judy DeRego after 1955, was an American competition swimmer who competed for Portland Oregon's Multinomah Swim Club and the Portland Jaycees. She was an American record holder in the 100-yard breaststroke who represented the United States at the 1952 Summer Olympics in Helsinki, Finland where she competed in the 200-meter breaststroke.

== Early life ==
Judy May Cornell was born March 28, 1933 in Portland, Oregon to Mr. and Mrs. Fred Cornell. First taking up swimming around 1942 at the age of 9, she struggled competing for a Portland YWCA. She trained with Portland's strong Multinomah Club by 1948 where she improved her times, and eventually gained recognition competing for talented Coach Jack Cody, becoming known as one of "Cody's Kids". She attended Grant High School, graduating in 1951. Between 1949-1952, she set State and City records in the 100-yard, 100-meter, and 50-meter breaststroke.

== Records ==
At 17, Cornell set a new 100-yard breaststroke American record at a meet in Palm Beach, Florida with a time of 1:12.6, and later set a record of 1:21 for the 100-meter breast. In June, 1951, she swam the 200-meter breaststroke for the first time at the Keo Natama Swim Meet in Honolulu in the impressive time of 3:05. After Jack Cody left the Multinomah Club, in February, 1951, Judy looked for alternate coaching, and found it with 1948 Olympian Nancy Merki Lees, a former Multinomah competitor. Nancy Lees successfully sought program funding from the Portland Junior Chamber of Commerce, and Cornell became the only athlete to ever be sponsored by the Portland Jaycees. Prior to the Olympics, Cornell gained national recognition by setting long-course U.S. records in both 1950 and 1951 in the 100 breaststroke. Judy moved to Asheville, North Carolina for a period, with her Coach Nancy Merki Lees to continue training for the 1952 Olympics, where she practiced at Asheville's YWCA on Grove Street and later at a larger outdoor Recreation Park pool.

Cornell placed second in the 200-meter breaststroke at the July 4-6, 1952 Olympic trials at Broad Ripple Pool Park, in Indianapolis, Indiana, gaining a berth to the 1952 Olympic team.

== 1952 Helsinki Olympics ==
Cornell competed in the preliminary heats of the women's 200-meter breaststroke at the 1952 Helsinki Olympics where she was managed by Women's Olympic Coach Richard O. Papenguth. Cornell finished 29th overall in the 200 breast with a time of 3:17.7. She may have come closer to an Olympic medal if the 100-meter breaststroke had been available to her as an event.

On returning from the Olympics, Cornell fondly remembered the Fifth Avenue parade in New York held to honor the U.S. Olympians.

=== Marriage ===
On June 4, 1955, Cornell married Daniel DeRego at the Church of the Madeleine in Portland, Oregon. At the time they met, Daniel was a lifeguard and outstanding surfer at Waikiki Beach. The couple honeymooned in California, and then lived in Honolulu. He competed in a surfing competition in Melbourne Australia in 1956.

=== Coaching ===
After a move back to Portland, Oregon, Judy and her husband Daniel had a long career as swim coached and coached YMCA and YWCA swimming. They were officially announced as the Portland YMCA's head swim team coaches on May 17, 1962, but may have been coaching in the area earlier.

Continuing to remain active during her years as a coach, in 1977 she completed the “Roy Webster Columbia River Cross-Channel Swim.” The 1.1 mile open water swim course across the Columbia River honoring orchardist and avid swimmer Ray Webster was started in 1943, and usually held on Labor Day, though it was discontinued in 2023. Cornell did the swim for several years and encouraged her students to participate.

=== Honors ===
In 2001 Cornell was made a member of the Portland Interscholastic League Hall of Fame.

As Judy Cornell DeRego, she died on January 4, 2021, in Hillsboro, Oregon at the age of 87. She was predeceased by her husband Dan, and survived by her daughters Terri and Gloria, grandchildren, and great grandchildren. In her late years, she continued to enjoy camping, skiing, gardening, and bicycle riding.
