= Raymonde Vergauwen =

Dutch-Belgian swimmer

Personal information
- Born: March 15, 1928 Sas van Gent, Zeeland, Netherlands
- Died: April 5, 2018 (aged 90) Sas van Gent, Zeeland, Netherlands

Sport
- Sport: Swimming
Medal record
Representing Belgium
European Championships
Gold medal – first place	1950 Vienna	200m breaststroke

Raymonda Elisa Florentina Vergauwen (15 March 1928 – 5 April 2018) was a Dutch breaststroke swimmer holding a Belgian passport (her father was from Belgium). She was born and died in Sas van Gent, Zeeland, the Netherlands. She won a gold medal in the 200m breaststroke event at the 1950 European Aquatics Championships and participated in the 1952 Summer Olympics, but did not reach the finals.
