= Éva Székely =

Hungarian swimmer (1927–2020)

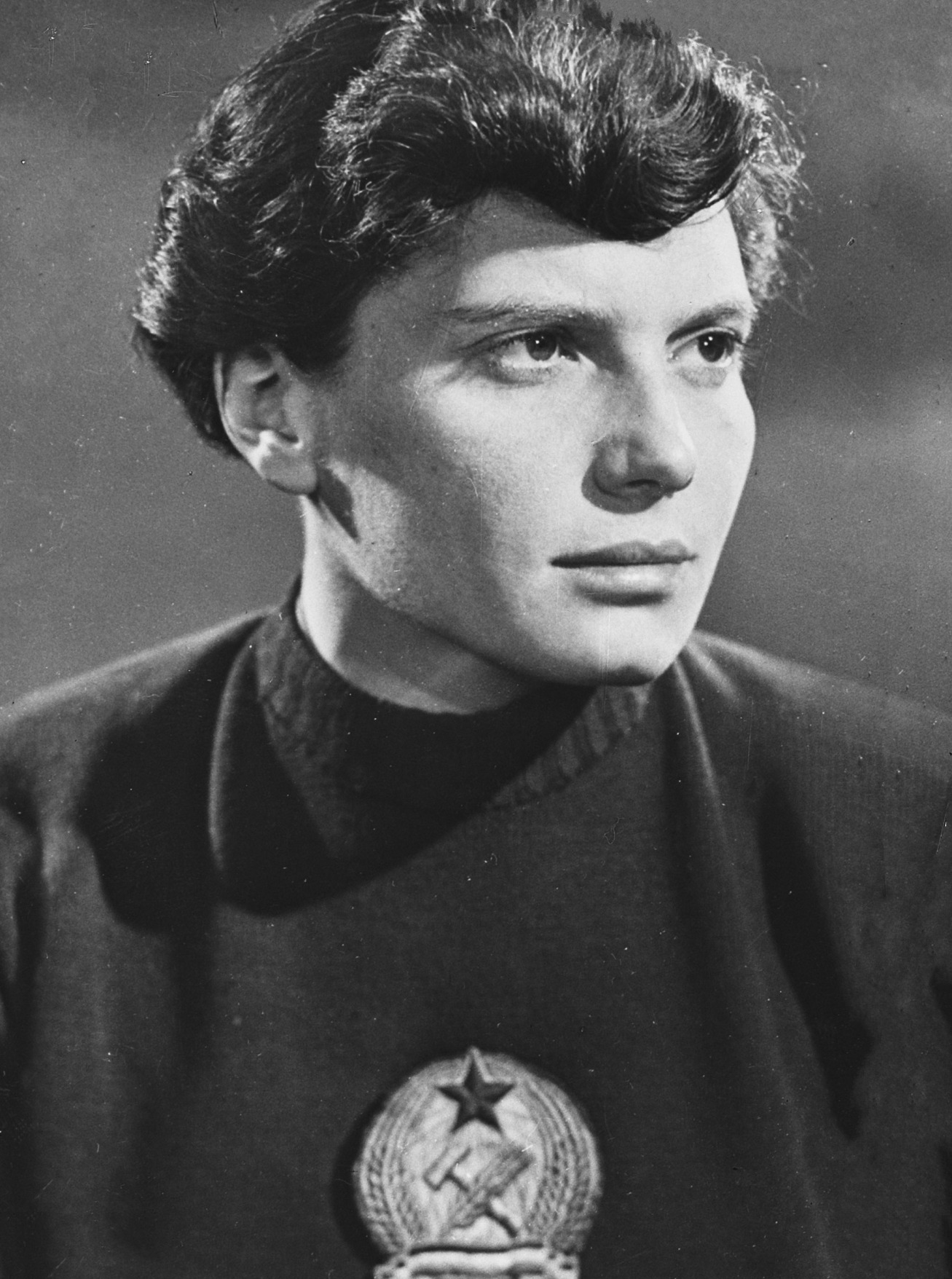
- Éva Székely in 1956

Personal information
- Born: 3 April 1927 Budapest, Kingdom of Hungary
- Died: 29 February 2020 (aged 92) Budapest, Hungary

Sport
- Sport: Swimming
- Club: Neményi MADISZ; BVSC, Budapest
Medal record
Representing Hungary
Olympic Games
| Gold medal – first place | 1952 Helsinki | 200 m breaststroke |
| Silver medal – second place | 1956 Melbourne | 200 m breaststroke |
European Championships
| Silver medal – second place | 1947 Monte Carlo | 200 m breaststroke |

Éva Székely (3 April 1927 – 29 February 2020) was a Hungarian swimmer. She won the gold medal at the 1952 Summer Olympics in Helsinki and the silver medal at the 1956 Summer Olympics, set six world records, and won 44 national titles. She held the first world record in the 400 m individual medley in 1953.

== Biography ==
Székely was born in Budapest, Hungary. Her mother was Orthodox Jewish from Upper Hungary, while her father was from Transylvania. As a child, she competed for a local swim team and in 1941, at 14 years of age, she set a national speed record, although she was barely allowed to start because she was a Jew and was soon expelled from the team because of her religion. She was excluded from competition for the next four years, and survived the Holocaust partly because she was a famous swimmer. Towards the end of World War II, she lived with 41 people in a crowded two-room “safe-house” in Budapest run by the Swiss, and to keep in shape, every day she ran up and down five flights of stairs 100 times.

At the end of World War II she met her husband, Dezső Gyarmati, a three-time Olympic water polo champion (1952, 1956, and 1964) in water polo; they later divorced and he predeceased her in 2013. Their daughter Andrea Gyarmati, born in 1954, was a backstroke and butterfly swimmer who won two medals at the 1972 Summer Olympics in Munich. After the Hungarian Revolution of 1956 the family defected to the United States but they did not stay, returning to care for Székely's parents – from then on the Hungarian authorities did not allow them to leave the country in each other's company.

Székely won three gold medals at the 1947 World University Games followed by five gold medals at the 1951 World University Championship. She won the gold medal in the 200-meter breaststroke (setting a new Olympic record) at the 1952 Summer Olympics in Helsinki, and the silver medal at the 1956 Summer Olympics. She also set six world records, and won 44 national titles. She held the first world record in the 400 m individual medley, in 1953.

After retiring from competitions Székely worked as a pharmacist and swimming coach, training her daughter among others.

In 1976 she was inducted into the International Swimming Hall of Fame. She was named as one of Hungary's Athletes of the Nation in 2004, and received the Prima Primissima award in 2011. She was also inducted into the International Jewish Sports Hall of Fame.

Székely died on 29 February 2020 at Budapest, at the age of 92.

== Publications ==
Székely authored three books, one of which was translated into other languages:

- Only winners are allowed to cry! (Sírni csak a győztesnek szabad!) Budapest, 1981, Magvető Kiadó
- I came, I saw, I lost? (Jöttem, láttam… Vesztettem?) Budapest, 1986, Magvető Kiadó
- I Swam It/I Survived (Megúsztam) Budapest, 1989, Sport Kiadó

== See also ==
- List of members of the International Swimming Hall of Fame
- List of select Jewish swimmers
- List of Jewish Olympic medalists
