= Tonnie Hom =

Dutch swimmer (1932–2013)

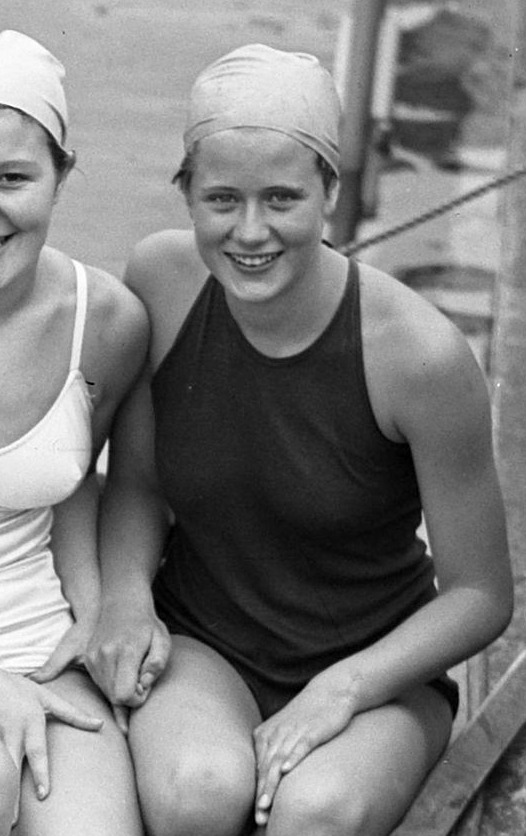
- Tonnie Hom in 1948

Personal information
- Born: 4 September 1932 Hilversum, the Netherlands
- Died: 23 August 2013 (aged 80) Nieuwegein, Netherlands

Sport
- Sport: Swimming
- Club: HZC de Robben, Hilversum
- Coach: Jan Stender

Antonia Johanna "Tonnie" Hom (4 September 1932 – 23 August 2013) was a Dutch swimmer. She competed in the 200 m breaststroke at the 1948 Olympics and finished in seventh place.
