= Elenor Gordon =

Scottish swimmer, Olympic bronze medallist (1933–2014)

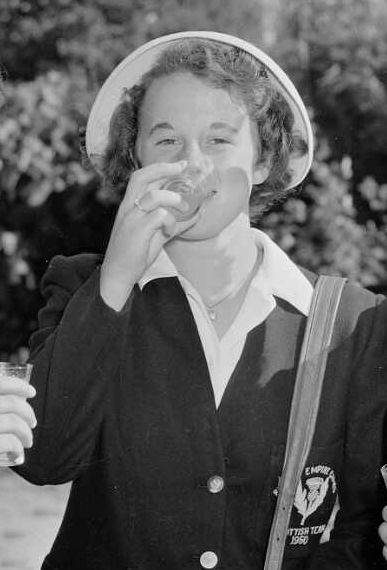
- Gordon at the 1950 British Empire Games

Personal information
- Full name: Helen Orr Gordon
- Nickname: "Elenor"
- National team: Great Britain
- Born: 10 May 1933 Hamilton, Scotland
- Died: 5 July 2014 (aged 81) Wishaw, Scotland

Sport
- Sport: Swimming
- Strokes: Breaststroke
- Club: Hamilton Baths
Medal record
Representing United Kingdom
Olympic Games
Bronze medal – third place	1952 Helsinki	200 m breaststroke
Representing Scotland
British Empire and Commonwealth Games
Gold medal – first place	1950 Auckland	220 yd breaststroke
Gold medal – first place	1954 Vancouver	220 yd breaststroke
Gold medal – first place	1954 Vancouver	3×110 yd medley
Bronze medal – third place	1950 Auckland	3×110 yd medley

Helen Orr "Elenor" Gordon (later McKay; 10 May 1933 – 5 July 2014) was a Scottish breaststroke swimmer who represented Great Britain at the 1948, 1952 and 1956 Olympics, and Scotland at the 1950 and 1954 British Empire Games. She won an Olympic bronze medal in the 200-metre breaststroke in 1952 and three gold medals at the British Empire Games.

== Early life ==
Gordon was born in Hamilton, Scotland. Gordon's mother, father and three daughters lived in a room and kitchen with an outside toilet opposite Hamilton police station. Her mother worked by taking in washing from the police station. She learnt to swim at Hamilton Baths, where her father Gavin Gordon worked as a lifeguard. She was also part of the swimming team coached by David Crabb at the Motherwell Baths. Her training had been restricted to 20-minute sessions at Hamilton where 90% of pool time was reserved for males. She had to compete for space with children learning to swim. Gordon remembered rationing in post-war Britain as a teenager. One of her memories was "queuing for hours in Hamilton after the war, and you were restricted to four apples when you got to the head of the queue." When she traveled for her competitions the family had to hand in their rationing books so that they were not given a surplus of food.

== Swimming career ==
From 1947 until 1957 Gordon was the Scottish champion in the 200-metre breaststroke. In 1948, aged 15, she was the youngest member of the 1948 British Olympic team. In 1949 she competed in the British Empire Games in New Zealand.

In 1950 she received the Nancy Riach memorial medal for her services to swimming. She won a bronze medal at the 1952 Summer Olympics in Helsinki, the only British medalist in swimming. In 1954, she won two medals at the Commonwealth Games in Vancouver.

In 2014 she reflected on this time "It feels like it all didn't happen to me," she said. "Swimming really is a different world today. I don't know whether I feel sorry or happy for these folk winning medals now. I don't really think they mean as much. It is different kettle of fish, going away to New Zealand and Australia now. They don't blink an eye, going away training somewhere for a month, and then they are back and off somewhere else. It's just not the same, but I would not swap places. Maybe we had the better of the travel, compared to flying today - taking six weeks by boat, and not being jet-lagged.

At the ASA National British Championships she won the 220 yards breaststroke title five times in 1950, 1951, 1952, 1955 and 1956.

Gordon retired from competitions after the 1956 Summer Olympics to raise a family. Besides, the Scottish Swimming Association revoked her amateur status after she accepted a 5-pound fee for a television appearance. She resumed competing in the 1990s, as a master swimmer, winning world titles and setting world records in the over 60 age group.

She was inducted into the Scottish Sports Hall of Fame in 2010.

== Reporting ==
After leaving swimming she wrote a weekly column for the Daily Express and Evening Citizen in Glasgow.

== Personal life ==
Gordon was married to fellow swimmer Ken McKay for 59 years, after meeting the pool at Hamilton Grammar when McKay was a pupil there. Gordon's husband of 59 years won 168 Scottish masters titles, 40 British titles, and five world golds, setting 10 world records and later became her carer. They had two sons, Colin and Allan and four granddaughters. She was a secretary and a sport reporter, covering swimming for two Scottish newspapers. Towards the end of her life, Gordon used a wheelchair due to a degenerative spinal condition. Gordon was inducted into the Scottish Sports Hall of Fame in 2003, and into the Scottish Swimming Hall of Fame in 2010. She died on 5 July 2014 at the age of 81, following a long battle against ill health in Wishaw. Her funeral was held at the Daldowie Crematorium.

== See also ==
- List of Olympic medalists in swimming (women)
