= Mariya Havrysh =

Ukrainian swimmer (1931–2001)

Personal information
- Born: 12 June 1931 Vinnytsia, Ukraine
- Died: 10 November 2001 (aged 70)

Sport
- Sport: Swimming
- Club: Dynamo Kyiv

Mariya Fedorivna Havrysh (Ukrainian: Марія Федорівна Гавриш; Russian: Мария Федоровна Гавриш; 12 June 1931 – 10 November 2001) was a Ukrainian swimmer. She was the first Soviet swimmer to reach an Olympic finals – at the 1952 Summer Olympics she finished sixth in the 200 m breaststroke. Between 1949 and 1955 she won 11 national titles (1949–1955) and set 19 national records in the 200 m breaststroke and 100 m butterfly events.

After marriage she changed her last name to Firsova (Ukrainian: Фірсова, Russian: Фирсова). Since 1989, when masters competitions had been introduced in the Soviet Union, she competed in this category and won four national titles, setting two national records (1989–1991) in the 50 m and 100 m breaststroke. After breakup of the Soviet Union, she competed in Ukraine, winning four national titles in 1992–1993.
