= Valerie Harris =

British swimmer

Personal information
- Born: 5 December 1935
- Died: 25 March 2022 (aged 86)

Sport
- Sport: Swimming

Valerie Harris (5 December 1935 – 25 March 2022) was a British swimmer. She competed in the women's 200 metre breaststroke at the 1952 Summer Olympics.
