= Nel Garritsen =

Dutch swimmer (1933–2014)

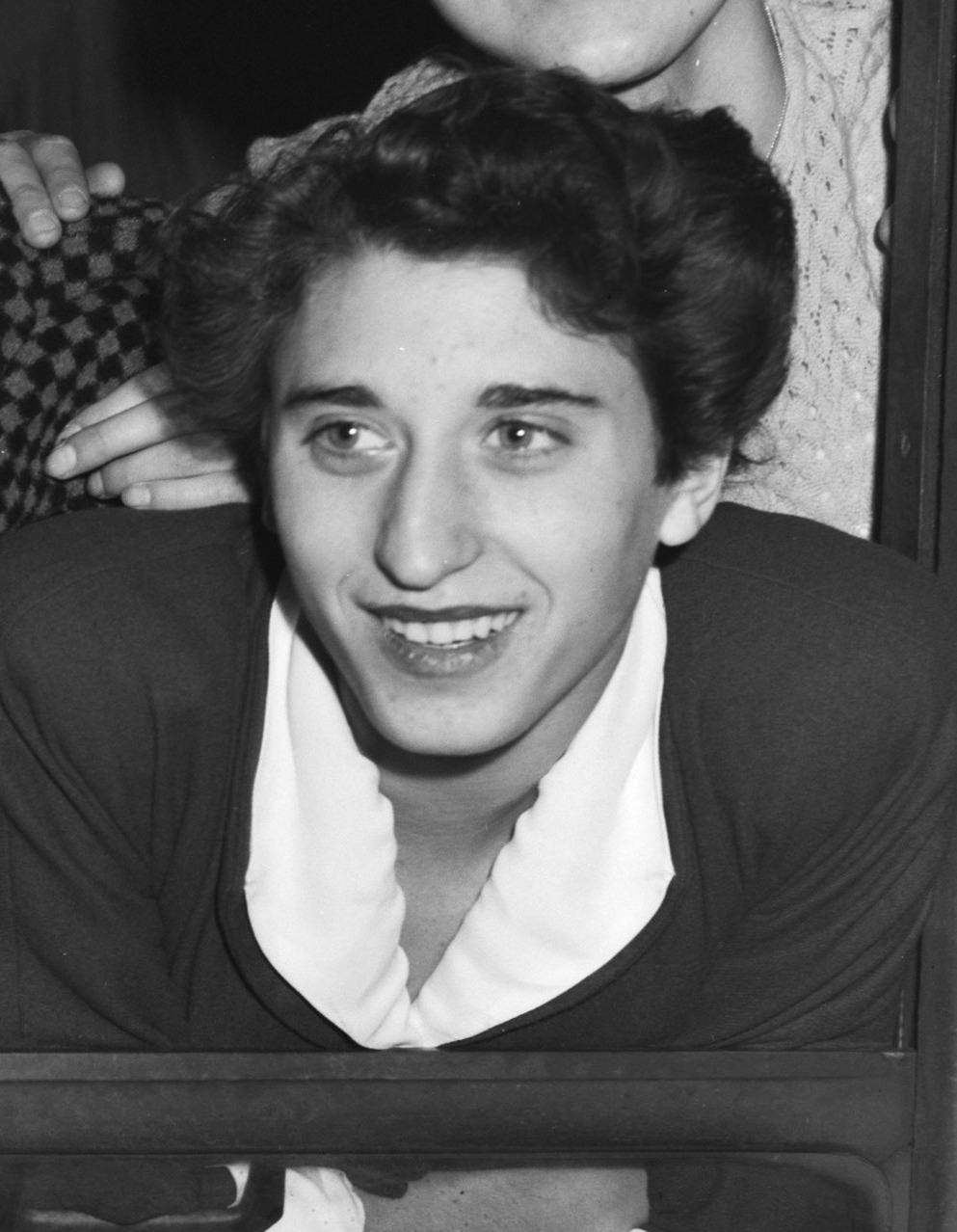
- Nel Garritsen in 1951

Personal information
- Born: 3 April 1933 Rotterdam, the Netherlands
- Died: 3 February 2014 (aged 80) Hulst, the Netherlands

Sport
- Sport: Swimming
- Club: RDZ, Rotterdam

Petronella Frederika Cornelia "Nel" Garritsen (3 April 1933 – 3 February 2014) was a Dutch swimmer. In 1949 and in 1950 she was part of the Dutch team that set a new world record in the now obsolete 3×100 medley relay event. She competed in the 200 m breaststroke at the 1952 Olympics and finished in eighth place. In those years it was allowed to use the butterfly stroke in breaststroke events, as the 1952 Olympic winners did. Following their example, Garritsen changed to butterfly and won two national titles in 1953 and 1954. She retired shortly thereafter.
