= Angela Diederichsen =

German judge

Angela Diederichsen (born 8 July 1950 in Neunburg vorm Wald) is a German judge who served at the German Federal Court of Justice for 15 years. She was appointed to Germany's highest court of ordinary jurisdiction on November 7, 2000, and remained until November 30, 2015, when she retired.

== Career ==
After studying to become a teacher for one year, Diederichsen went on to study law at the Ludwig-Maximilians-Universität München. Here she took the first and second state examinations in 1974 and 1977. She briefly worked for Bavaria's state ministry in Munich, before working in various positions, including as a public prosecutor. In 1994 she was appointed as a judge at the higher regional court of Bavaria where she judged matters of civil and criminal law.

At the time of Diederichsen's appointment to the German Federal Court of Justice, only 12 of the 100 judges were women. (In 2015, 36 of the 130 judges (28%) were female.) Diederichsen worked primarily on matters of tort law, and from February 2014, served as the deputy chairwoman for the Sixth Civil Chamber of the Federal Court of Justice.
