= Aleksandra Mróz =

Polish swimmer

Personal information
- Full name: Aleksandra Gabriela Mróz-Jaśkiewicz
- Born: 23 June 1935 Bydgoszcz, Poland
- Died: 5 July 2015 (aged 80)

Sport
- Sport: Swimming

Aleksandra Mróz (23 June 1935 – 5 July 2015) was a Polish swimmer. She competed in the women's 200 metre breaststroke at the 1952 Summer Olympics.
