= Dorotea Turnbull =

Argentine swimmer

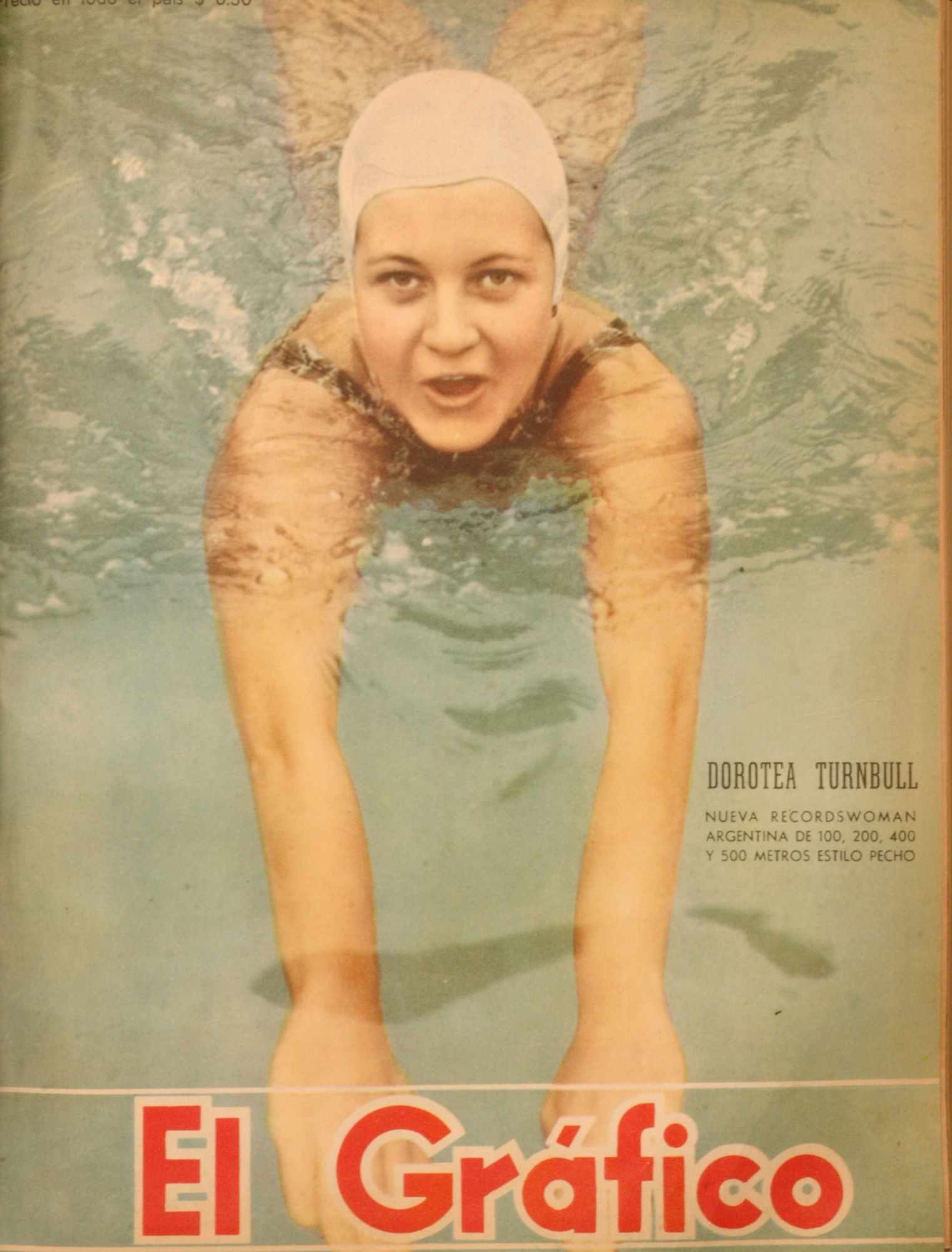

Personal information
- Nationality: Argentina
- Born: 20 May 1929
- Died: 11 January 2016 (aged 86)

Sport
- Sport: Swimming
- Strokes: Breaststroke
Medal record
Women's swimming
Representing Argentina
Pan American Games
Gold medal – first place	1951 Buenos Aires	200 m breaststroke

Dorotea Mather Turnbull (20 May 1929 – 11 January 2016) was an Argentine breaststroke swimmer who competed at the 1948 Summer Olympics.
