= Helga Diederichsen =

Mexican swimmer (1930–2005)

Personal information
- Born: 22 September 1930 Mexico City, Mexico
- Died: 17 May 2005 (aged 74)

Sport
- Sport: Swimming
Medal record
Representing Mexico
Central American and Caribbean Games
Gold medal – first place	1946 Barranquilla	200m breaststroke

Helga Diederichsen (22 September 1930 – 17 May 2005) was a Mexican breaststroke swimmer. She competed in the women's 200 metre breaststroke at the 1948 Summer Olympics.
