= Roza Zenziveyeva =

Soviet swimmer

Personal information
- Full name: Roza Alekseyevna Zenziveyeva
- Born: 21 March 1931

Sport
- Sport: Swimming

Roza Zenziveyeva (born 21 March 1931) is a Soviet former swimmer. She competed in the women's 200 metre breaststroke at the 1952 Summer Olympics.
