= Vinka Jeričević =

Yugoslav swimmer

Personal information
- Born: 30 November 1936 (age 89)

Sport
- Sport: Swimming

Vinka Jeričević (born 30 November 1936) is a Yugoslav former swimmer. She competed in the women's 200 metre breaststroke at the 1956 Summer Olympics, placing fourth.

Awards
Preceded by Milka Babović	Yugoslav Sportswoman of the Year; 1956	Succeeded by Nada Vučković
