= Liselotte Kobi =

Swiss swimmer

Personal information
- Born: 15 February 1930 Schaffhausen, Switzerland
- Died: 25 June 2022 (aged 92)

Sport
- Sport: Swimming

Liselotte Kobi (15 February 1930 – 25 June 2022) was a Swiss swimmer. She competed at the 1948 Summer Olympics and the 1952 Summer Olympics.
