= Lies Bonnier =

Dutch swimmer (1925–2021)

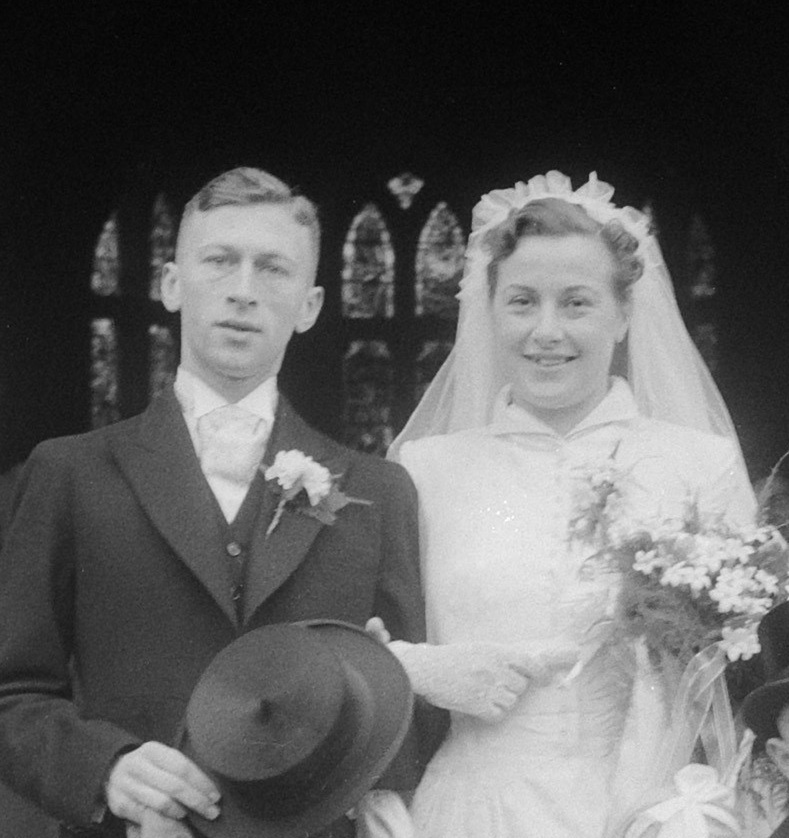
- Lies Bonnier and Chris Burg in 1953

Personal information
- Born: 8 July 1925 's-Hertogenbosch, Netherlands
- Died: 22 August 2021 (aged 96) Gooise Meren, Netherlands

Sport
- Sport: Swimming
- Club: Aegir, Eindhoven
Medal record
Women's swimming
Representing the Netherlands
European Championships
| Silver medal – second place | 1950 Vienna | 200 m breaststroke |

Elisabeth Johanna Maria "Lies" Bonnier (8 July 1925 – 22 August 2021) was a Dutch swimmer who won a silver medal at the 1950 European Aquatics Championships in the 200 m breaststroke. In 1952, after winning a national title, she competed in the same event at the Summer Olympics, but was eliminated in preliminaries. On 17 November 1953 she married Chris Burg. Bonnier died on 22 August 2021, at the age of 96.
