= Nel van Vliet =

Dutch swimmer (1926–2006)

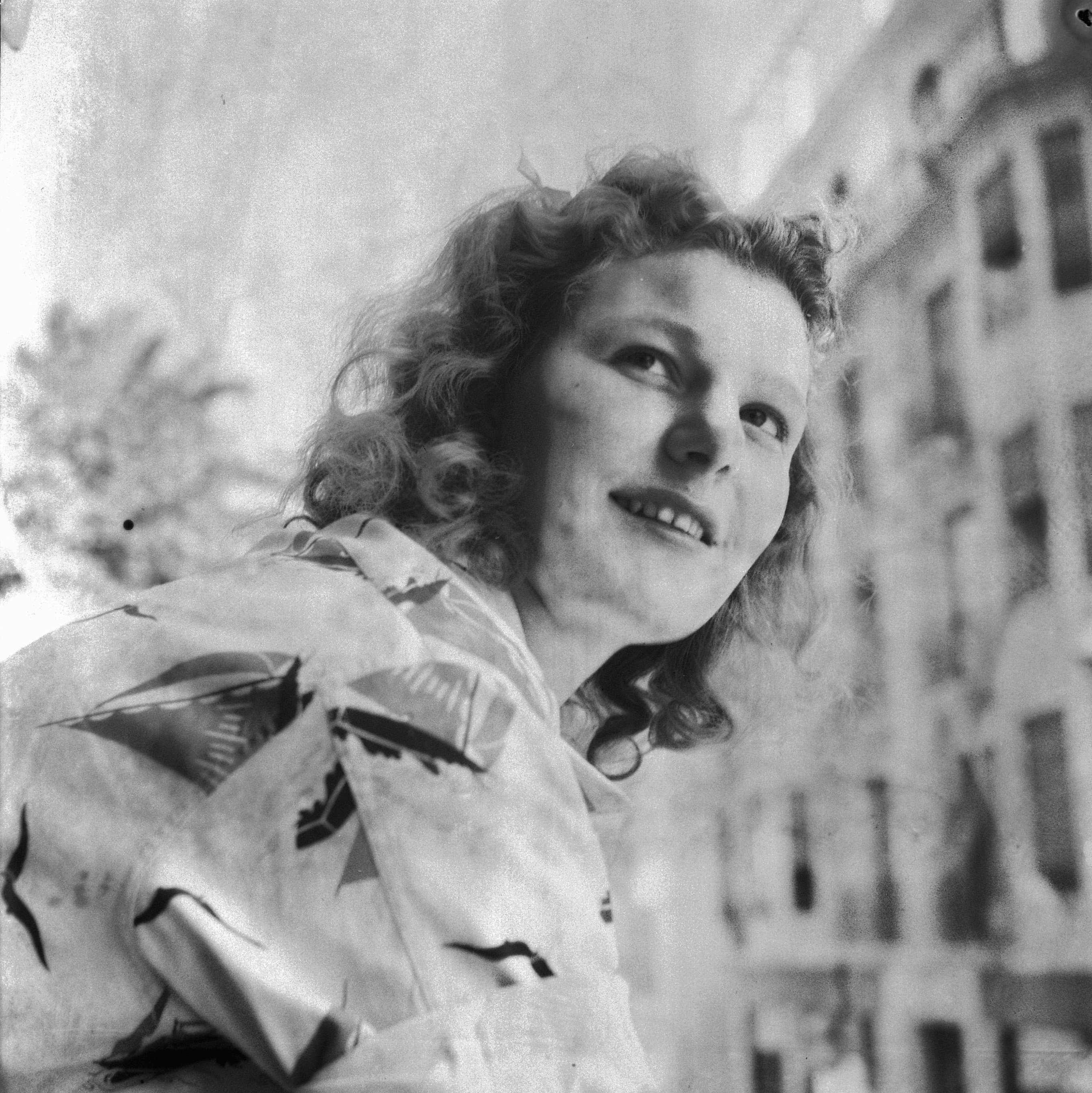
- Nel van Vliet, 1947

Personal information
- Born: 17 January 1926 Hilversum, the Netherlands
- Died: 4 January 2006 (aged 79) Naarden, the Netherlands

Sport
- Sport: Swimming
- Club: HZC de Robben, Hilversum
- Coach: Jan Stender
Medal record
Representing the Netherlands
Olympic Games
Gold medal – first place	1948 London	200 m breaststroke
European Championships
Gold medal – first place	1947 Monte Carlo	200 m breaststroke

Petronella "Nel" van Vliet (17 January 1926 – 4 January 2006) was a breaststroke swimmer from the Netherlands. She won gold medals in the 200 m breaststroke at the 1947 European Aquatics Championships and 1948 Summer Olympics. In 1973, she was inducted into the International Swimming Hall of Fame.

== Biography ==
Nel van Vliet was born in Hilversum and learned to swim only around the age of 16 (c. 1942), during World War II. In 1943, she became national champion in the 200 m breaststroke, her favorite discipline. She improved significantly after the end of the war, setting 13 world records in various breaststroke and medley relay events in 1946–1947, and winning national championships in 1946 and 1948. Her international career was hindered by that she was not registered with the Dutch authorities at birth. After this problem was rectified, she became European (1947) and Olympic (1948) champion in the 200 m breaststroke event. To win the 1948 Olympics, it was sufficient for her to swim eight seconds slower than her personal best time, that is, the world record. Van Vliet was the first top swimmer raised by the famous Dutch coach Jan Stender.

After retiring from swimming she devoted her time to raising her three children. Her marriage lasted only five years, and to earn for the family she had to quit competitive swimming and start working as a swimming coach. Her Olympic gold medal was stolen from her home in 1948 and was reissued to her only in 2004. She died two years later from a cancer-related illness in Naarden.

== Gallery ==
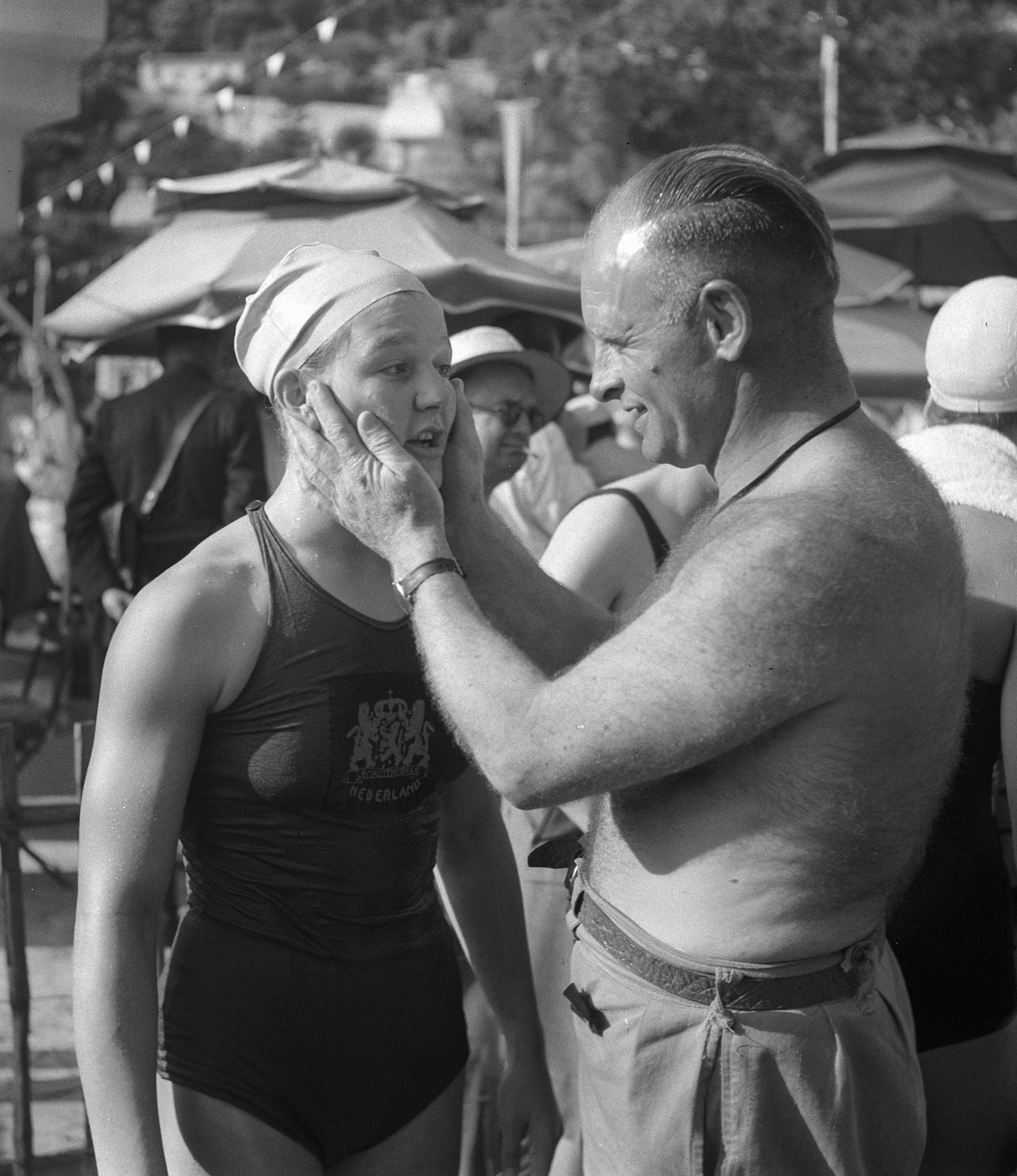
Van Vliet and Stender at the 1947 European Championships

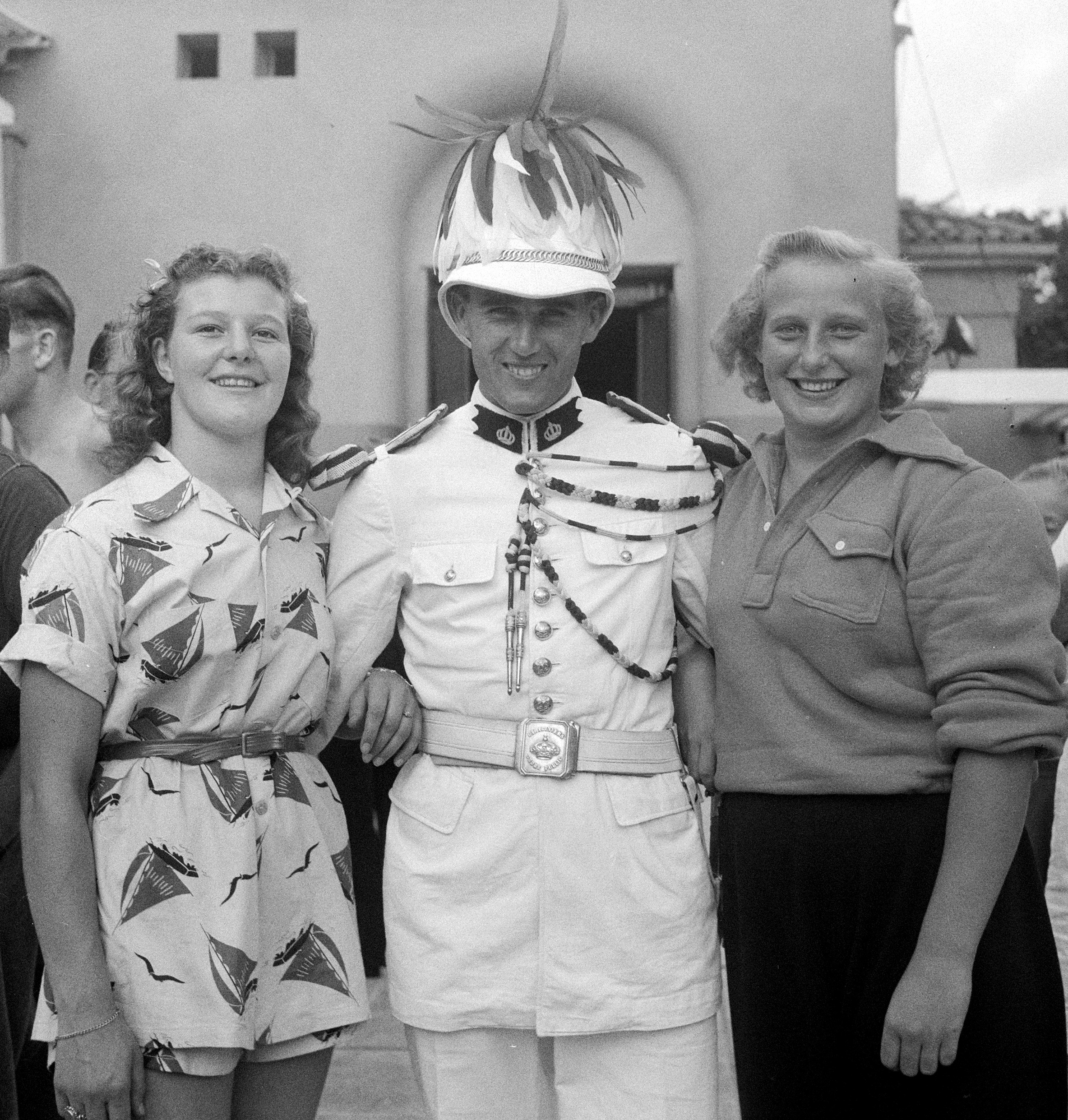
Van Vliet and Hannie Termeulen with a Monegasque soldier at the 1947 European Championships

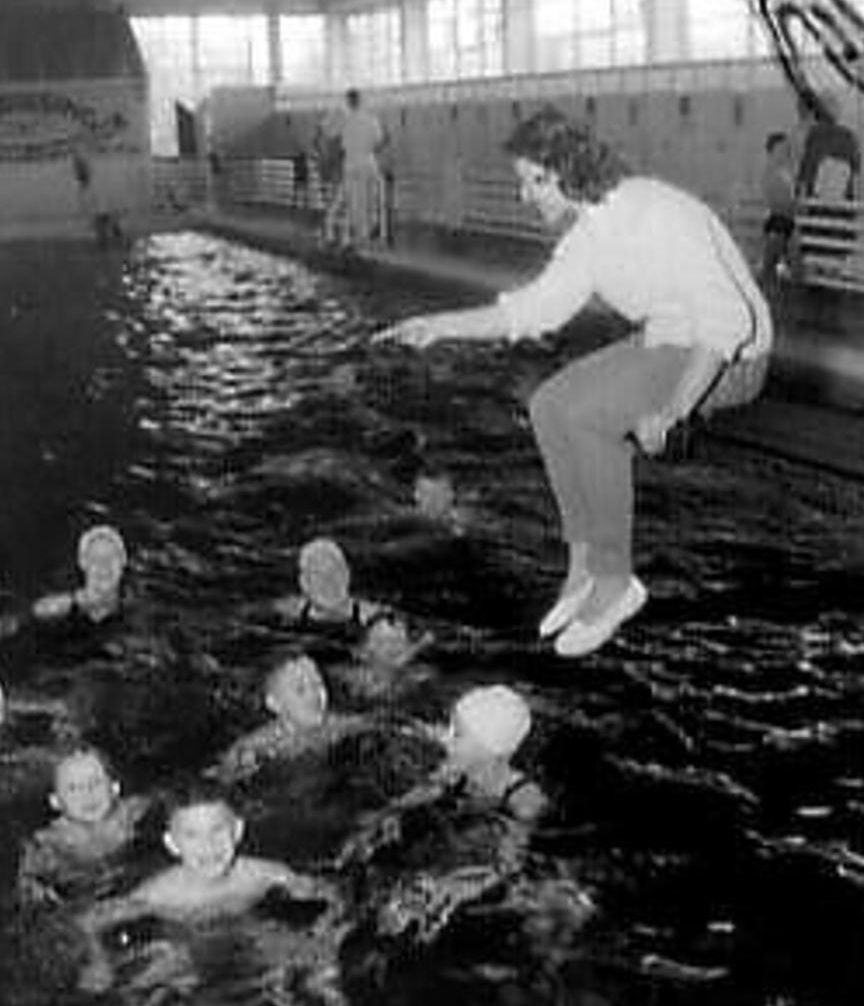
Van Vliet coaching in 1957

== See also ==
- List of members of the International Swimming Hall of Fame
