= Elena Zennaro =

Italian swimmer (born 1942)

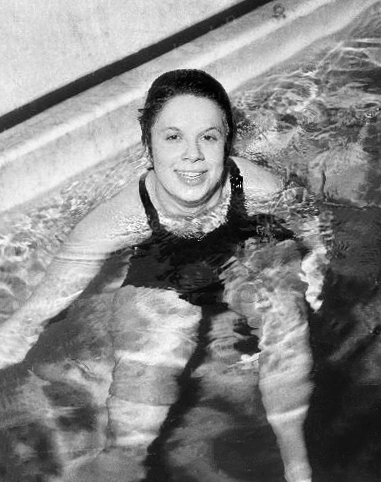
- Elena Zennaro in 1960

Personal information
- Born: 23 March 1943 (age 83) Santo Stefano di Cadore, Belluno, Italy
- Height: 1.67 m (5 ft 6 in)
- Weight: 56 kg (123 lb)

Sport
- Sport: Swimming

Elena Zennaro (born 27 September 1942) is a retired Italian breaststroke swimmer. She competed in the 200 m event at the 1956 and 1960 Summer Olympics, but failed to reach the finals.
