= Scottish Swimming =

Sports governing body in Scotland

Scottish Swimming, also known as the Scottish Amateur Swimming Association (SASA), is the national governing body for swimming, diving, water polo and artistic swimming in Scotland. The SASA and the English and Welsh swimming associations form British Swimming, which is responsible for British teams at the Olympics, and other events in which the United Kingdom sends a combined team.

Founded in 1888, the SASA was incorporated as a limited company in 2003. It comprises four districts – North, Midlands, East and West and has 160 affiliated swimming clubs across the country.

It is based on the campus of the University of Stirling.

== Sponsorship ==
In 2009, British Swimming announced a £15 million, 6 year sponsorship deal with British Gas, to cover the Home Country Associations too.
