= Jytte Hansen =

Danish swimmer (1932–2015)

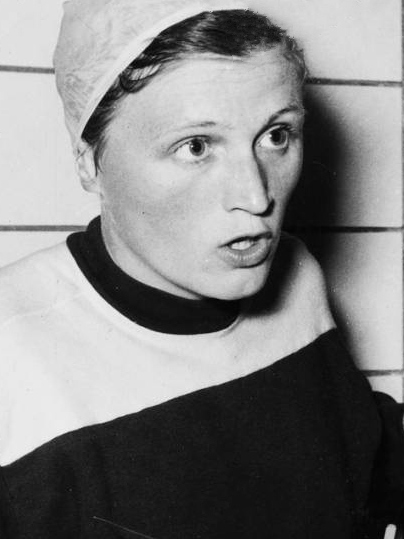
- Hansen in 1948

Personal information
- Born: 25 July 1932 Odense, Denmark
- Died: 26 November 2015 (aged 83)
- Height: 1.73 m (5 ft 8 in)
- Weight: 55 kg (121 lb)

Sport
- Sport: Swimming
- Club: Svømmeklubben Frem, Odense
Medal record
Representing Denmark
European championships
Silver medal – second place	1954 Turin	200 m breaststroke

Jytte Solveig Hansen (25 July 1932 – 26 November 2015) was a Danish swimmer who won a silver medal in the 200 m breaststroke at the 1954 European Aquatics Championships. She competed in the same event at the 1948, 1952 and 1956 Summer Olympics with the best achievement of fifth place in 1952.

== Biography ==
Hansen started swimming in a club in 1946. Already in 1948, she won the national championships in the 100 m and 200 m breaststroke and reached the finals at the 1948 Olympics. In 1958, she married her coach, Jørgen Nielsen, and changed her last name. After retiring from competitions she worked for 37 years as a swimming coach.
