= Poland at the 1952 Summer Olympics =

- IOC code: POL
- NOC: Polish Olympic Committee

in Helsinki
- Competitors: 125 in 11 sports
- Flag bearer: Teodor Kocerka
- Medals Ranked 20th: Gold 1 Silver 2 Bronze 1 Total 4

Summer Olympics appearances (overview)
- 1924; 1928; 1932; 1936; 1948; 1952; 1956; 1960; 1964; 1968; 1972; 1976; 1980; 1984; 1988; 1992; 1996; 2000; 2004; 2008; 2012; 2016; 2020; 2024

Other related appearances
- Russian Empire (1900, 1912); Austria (1908–1912)

Poland competed at the 1952 Summer Olympics in Helsinki, Finland. 125 competitors, 103 men and 22 women, took part in 74 events in 11 sports. Zygmunt Chychła became first post-War Olympic gold champion.

== Medalists ==
Medal	Name	Sport	Event
Gold	Zygmunt Chychła	Boxing	Men's welterweight
Silver	Aleksy Antkiewicz	Boxing	Men's lightweight
Silver	Jerzy Jokiel	Gymnastics	Men's floor
Bronze	Teodor Kocerka	Rowing	Men's single sculls

== Athletics ==
Men
Track & road events

Athlete	Event	Heat		Quarterfinal		Semifinal		Final	
Athlete	Event	Result	Rank	Result	Rank	Result	Rank	Result	Rank
Roman Budzyński	200 m	23.37	2 Q	22.51	6	Did not advance			
Mieczysław Długoborski	1500 m	3:57.8	6	Did not advance					
Alojzy Graj	5000 m	14:30.0	7	—N/a				Did not advance	
Jan Kielas	3000 m steeplechase	9:15.4	7	Did not advance					
Emil Kiszka	100 m	11.13	3	Did not advance					
Roman Korban	800 m	1:54.7	4	Did not advance					
Stefan Lewandowski	1500 m	4:00.8	7	Did not advance					
Gerard Mach	200 m	22.16	2 Q	22.12	4	Did not advance			
Gerard Mach	400 m	48.64	2 Q	DNS		Did not advance			
Winand Osiński	Marathon	—N/a						2:54:38.2	47
Edmund Potrzebowski	800 m	1:52.6	2 Q	1:53.7	5	Did not advance			
Edmund Potrzebowski	1500 m	3:56.8	6	Did not advance					
Zdobysław Stawczyk	200 m	22.22	2 Q	22.12	4	Did not advance			
Zygmunt Buhl; Emil Kiszka; Zdobysław Stawczyk; Dominik Sucheński	4 × 100 m relay	41.8	3 Q	—N/a		41.8	5	Did not advance	

Field events

Athlete	Event	Qualification		Final	
Athlete	Event	Distance	Position	Distance	Position
Henryk Grabowski	Long jump	6.77	21	Did not advance	
Stanisław Kowal	Triple jump	14.03	28	Did not advance	
Tadeusz Krzyżanowski	Shot put	14.90	11 Q	15.08	10
Zbigniew Radziwonowicz	Javelin throw	61.50	20	Did not advance	
Janusz Sidło	Javelin throw	62.16	18	Did not advance	
Zygfryd Weinberg	Triple jump	14.65	9 Q	14.76	10

Women
Track & road events

Athlete	Event	Heat		Quarterfinal		Semifinal		Final	
Athlete	Event	Result	Rank	Result	Rank	Result	Rank	Result	Rank
Maria Arndt	200 m	25.9	6	Did not advance					
Elzbieta Bocian	100 m	12.9	4	Did not advance					
Genowefa Minicka	200 m	25.9	4	Did not advance					
Eulalia Szwajkowska	200 m	25.5	1 Q	—N/a		25.2	6	Did not advance	
Maria Arndt; Maria Ilwicka; Genowefa Minicka; Eulalia Szwajkowska	4 × 100 m relay	48.1	4	Did not advance					

Field events

Athlete	Event	Qualification		Final	
Athlete	Event	Distance	Position	Distance	Position
Magdalena Breguła	Shot put	13.05	6 Q	12.93	10
Maria Ciach	Javelin throw	39.96	12 Q	44.31	7
Elżbieta Krysińska	Shot put	11.50	16	Did not advance	
Elżbieta Krzesińska-Duńska	Long jump	5.43	18 Q	5.65	12
Maria Ilwicka	Long jump	5.09	32	Did not advance	

== Boxing ==
Men

Athlete	Event	1 Round	2 Round	Quarterfinals	Semifinals	Final	
Athlete	Event	Opposition Result	Opposition Result	Opposition Result	Opposition Result	Opposition Result	Rank
Henryk Kukier	Flyweight	Edgar Basel (GER); L 0:3	Did not advance				
Henryk Niedźwiedzki	Bantamweight	Ronald Charles Gower (AUS); W TKO	Pentti Hamalainen (FIN); L 0:3	Did not advance			
Leszek Drogosz	Featherweight	Kyar Ba Nyein (BIR); W 3:0	Pedro Galasso (BRA); W 3:0	Sergio Caprari (ITA); L 0:3	Did not advance		
Aleksy Antkiewicz	Lightweight	Benjamin Enriquez (PHI); W 3:0	Hans-Werner Wohlers (GER); W 3:0	Frederick Reardon (GBR); W 3:0	Gheorghe Fiat (ROU); W WO	Aureliano Bolognesi (ITA); L 0:3	Silver medal
Leszek Kudłacik	Light Welterweight	Rene Weismann (FRA); L 1:2	Did not advance				
Zygmunt Chychla	Welterweight	Pierre Wouters (BEL); W 3:0	José Luis Dávalos Noriega (MEX); W 3:0	Július Torma (TCH); W 2:1	Günther Heidemann (GER); W 2:1	Sergei Scherbakov (URS); W 3:0	Gold medal
Jerzy Krawczyk	Light Middleweight	BYE	Boris Tishin (URS); L TKO	Did not advance			
Henryk Nowara	Middleweight	Khan Mohammad (PAK); L 1:2	Did not advance				
Tadeusz Grzelak	Light Heavyweight	BYE	Franz Pfitscher (AUT); W 3:0	Norvel Lee (USA); L 0:3	Did not advance		
Antoni Gościański	Heavyweight	Algirdas Šocikas (URS); L TKO	Did not advance				

== Fencing ==
13 fencers, 10 male and 3 female, represented Poland in 1952.

=== Men ===
Athlete	Event	Elimination round		Quarterfinal		Semifinal		Final	
Athlete	Event	Opposition Result	Rank	Opposition Result	Rank	Opposition Result	Rank	Opposition Result	Rank
Adam Krajewski	Men's épée	Haro (MEX); Kerttula (FIN); Sákovics (HUN); Eriksen (NOR); Gutiérrez (VEN); Henrion (BEL); López (GUA)	1 Q	Gretsch (LUX); Wiik (FIN); Lüchow (DEN); Forssell (SWE); Delaunois (BEL); Berzsenyi (HUN); Parfitt (GBR)	8	Did not advance			38
Andrzej Przeździecki	Men's épée	Lüchow (DEN); Maquet (BEL); Vebell (USA); Brooke (CAN); Massini (ARG); Uray (ROU); Stanmore (AUS)	4 Q	Pavesi (ITA); Buck (LUX); Abdel Rahman (EGY); Dybkær (DEN); Barth (SUI) von Koss (NOR); Lund (AUS); Dias (POR)	7	Did not advance			32
Wojciech Rydz	Men's épée	Rerrich (HUN); Jay (GBR); Pekelman (BRA); Deksbakh (URS); Chelaru (ROU); Bertorelli (VEN); Duffy (IRL)	4 Q	Mangiarotti (ITA); Fahlman (SWE); Maquet (BEL); Bougnol (FRA); Haro (MEX); Pekelman (BRA); Marinescu (ROU); Pinto (DEN)	8	Did not advance			35
Andrzej Przeździecki; Wojciech Rydz; Jan Nawrocki; Adam Krajewski; Zygmunt Grodner	Team épée	Great Britain; L 6-10; Sweden; L 0-9	3	Did not advance					7
Jerzy Pawłowski	Men's foil	Uralov (URS); Bukantz (USA); Valcke (BEL); Raitio (FIN); Knödler (SAA); Menéndez (CUB)	4 Q	Di Rosa (ITA); Eriksson (SWE); Dessouki (EGY); Paul (GBR); Midler (URS)}	4	Did not advance			20
Jerzy Twardokens	Men's foil	Verhalle (BEL); Paul (GBR); Galimi (ARG); Wahl (IRL); Maki (JPN); Soberón (GUA)	2 Q	Bergamini (ITA); Younes (EGY); Axelrod (USA); Lindeman (FIN); Galimi (ARG); Iesi (URU)	4	Did not advance			19
Jerzy Pawłowski	Men's sabre	Heywaert (BEL); Manayenko (URS); Carnera (DEN); Rau (SAA); Fethers (AUS); Cámara (MEX); Gutiérrez (VEN)	1 Q	Lefèvre (FRA); Loisel (AUT); Darè (ITA); Abdel Rahman (EGY); Nordin (SWE); Anderson (GBR); Amez-Droz (SUI)	2 Q	Kovács (HUN); Pinton (ITA); Ballister (BEL); Loisel (AUT); Levavasseur (FRA)	6	Did not advance	17
Leszek Suski	Men's sabre	Loisel (AUT); Pomini (ARG); Santo (ROU); Ruben (DEN); Menegalli (SUI); Sandner (VEN); Lund (AUS)	2 Q	Gerevich (HUN); Manayenko (URS); Nostini (ITA); Frey (DEN); Haro (MEX); D'Andrea (ARG); Kwartler (USA)	2 Q	Lefèvre (FRA); Plattner (AUT); Berczelly (HUN); Gurath Sr. (ROU); Heywaert (BEL)	5	Did not advance	16
Wojciech Zabłocki	Men's sabre	Beatley (GBR); Fascher (GER); Plattner (AUT); Molnar (BRA); Bach (SAA); Gibson (AUS); Pessanha (POR)	1 Q	Kovács (HUN); Plattner (AUT); Ballister (BEL); Gurath Sr. (ROU); Worth (USA); Kuznetsov (URS); Pomini (ARG)	7	Did not advance			32
Jerzy Twardokens; Jerzy Pawłowski; Wojciech Zabłocki; Zygmunt Pawlas; Leszek Suski	Team sabre	Romania; W 8-8; France; W 6-1	1 Q	Egypt; W 10-6	1 Q	United States; L 6-10; Italy; L 4-11	4	Did not advance	5

=== Women ===
Athlete	Event	Elimination round		Quarterfinals		Semifinals		Final	
Athlete	Event	Opposition Result	Rank	Opposition Result	Rank	Opposition Result	Rank	Opposition Result	Rank
Irena Nawrocka	Women's foil	Strukel (ITA); Glen-Haig (GBR); Craus (USA); Rieder (DEN); Mahaut (DEN)	1 Q	York-Romary (USA); Garilhe (FRA); Müller-Preis (AUT); Glen-Haig (GBR); Irigoyen (ARG)	5	Did not advance			20
Maria Sołtan	Women's foil	Allgayer (GER); Elek (HUN); Garilhe (FRA); Sheen (GBR); Cesari (ITA)	6	Did not advance					32
Wanda Włodarczyk	Women's foil	Lachmann (DEN); Camber-Corno (ITA); Buller (GBR); Shitikova (GBR); Kalka (FIN); Selle (VEN)	7	Did not advance					37

== Football ==
=== Preliminary round results ===
15 July 1952
19:00

Poland	2–1	France
Trampisz 31'; Krasówka 49'	Report	Leblond 30'

Lahden kisapuisto, Lahti
Attendance: 3,752
Referee: Karel van der Meer (NED)

=== First round results ===
21 July 1952
19:00

Denmark	2–0	Poland
Seebach 17'; S. Nielsen 69'	Report

Kupittaa, Turku
Attendance: 6,024
Referee: Folke Bålstad (NOR)

== Gymnastics ==
=== Artistic ===
Men

Athlete	Event	Final Standings								Apparatus Final							
Athlete	Event	Apparatus						Total	Rank	Apparatus						Total	Rank
Athlete	Event	F	PH	R	V	PB	HB	Total	Rank	F	PH	R	V	PB	HB	Total	Rank
Paweł Gaca	All-around	17.30	17.80	10.35	18.20	17.90	17.75	99.30	113	—N/a							
Paweł Gawron	All-around	16.60	17.70	16.70	13.50	17.85	17.45	99.80	103	—N/a							
Jerzy Jokiel	All-around	19.15	12.80	16.00	16.65	17.10	17.30	99.00	117	19.15	—N/a					19.15	Silver medal
Ryszard Kucjas	All-around	17.30	13.30	17.35	17.35	17.20	16.35	98.85	118	—N/a							
Zdzisław Lesiński	All-around	16.90	16.05	18.30	17.35	14.85	16.10	99.55	111	—N/a							
Szymon Sobala	All-around	17.90	17.90	18.00	17.15	18.15	17.85	106.95	60	—N/a							
Jerzy Solarz	All-around	18.30	15.70	15.30	16.05	17.45	9.50	92.30	148	—N/a							
Paweł Świętek	All-around	17.70	16.50	17.90	15.95	17.75	15.10	100.90	101	—N/a							
Paweł Gaca; Paweł Gawron; Jerzy Jokiel; Ryszard Kucjas; Zdzisław Leśniewski; Szymon Sobala; Jerzy Solarz; Paweł Świętek	Team all-around	90.50	86.30	88.60	87.15	89.30	87.25	529.10	13	—N/a							

Women

Athlete	Event	Final Standings						Apparatus Final					
Athlete	Event	Apparatus				Total	Rank	Apparatus				Total	Rank
Athlete	Event	F	V	UB	BB	Total	Rank	F	V	UB	BB	Total	Rank
Dorota Horzonek-Jokiel	All-around	17.36	17.49	15.76	16.96	67.57	86	—N/a					
Zofia Kowalczyk	All-around	17.69	17.29	16.92	17.30	69.20	67	—N/a					
Urszula Łukomska	All-around	17.12	15.62	17.80	12.36	62.90	123	—N/a					
Honorata Marcińczak	All-around	17.00	17.36	17.46	17.03	68.85	69	—N/a					
Helena Rakoczy	All-around	18.29	18.79	16.00	17.66	70.74	43	—N/a					
Stefania Reindl	All-around	18.06	18.46	17.86	16.53	70.91	38	—N/a					
Stefania Świerzy	All-around	18.16	18.46	17.30	17.76	71.68	27	—N/a					
Barbara Wilk-Ślizowska	All-around	17.89	15.29	17.76	17.20	68.14	76	—N/a					
Dorota Horzonek-Jokiel; Zofia Kowalczyk; Urszula Łukomska; Honorata Marcińczak; Helena Rakoczy; Stefania Reindl; Stefania Świerzy; Barbara Wilk-Ślizowska	Team all-around	141.57	138.76	136.86	132.80	483.72	8	—N/a					

Athlete	Event	Final		
Athlete	Event	Portable	Total	Rank
Athlete	Event	Apparatus	Total	Rank
Dorota Horzonek-Jokiel; Zofia Kowalczyk; Urszula Łukomska; Honorata Marcińczak; Helena Rakoczy; Stefania Reindl; Stefania Świerzy; Barbara Wilk-Ślizowska	Team Portable apparatus	Hoop	64.20	14

== Hockey ==
=== First round results ===
16 July 1952
07:30

Germany	7 – 2	Poland
Stoltenberg; Budinger; Thielemann		Flinik; Marzec

== Rowing ==
Men

Athlete	Event	Heats		Repechage		Semifinal		Repechage		Final	
Athlete	Event	Time	Rank	Time	Rank	Time	Rank	Time	Rank	Time	Rank
Teodor Kocerka	Single sculls	7:59.5	2 Q	BYE		9:10.6	4	7:41.8	1 Q	8:19.4	Bronze medal
Jan Świątkowski; Stanisław Wieśniak	Coxless pair	DSQ		7:39.7	2	Did not advance					
Czesław Lorenc; Romuald Thomas; Zdzisław Michalski	Coxed pair	7:59.8	2 Q	BYE		8:12.1	3 Q	8:00.9	2	Did not advance	7
Edward Schwarzer; Zbigniew Schwarzer; Henryk Jagodziński; Zbigniew Żarnowiecki	Coxless four	6:43.0	3 R	6:45.9	1 Q	BYE		6:43.0	1 Q	7:28.2	5

== Shooting ==
Two shooters represented Poland in 1952.

Men

Athlete	Event	Final	
Athlete	Event	Score	Rank
Olgierd Darżynkiewicz	Trap	181	20
Józef Kiszkurno	Trap	185	9

== Swimming ==
Men

Athlete	Event	Heat		Semifinal		Final	
Athlete	Event	Time	Rank	Time	Rank	Time	Rank
Jerzy Boniecki	100 metre backstroke	1:13.4	31	Did not advance			
Gotfryd Gremlowski	400 metre freestroke	4:49.0	13 Q	4:47.4	13	Did not advance	
Gotfryd Gremlowski	1500 metre freestroke	19:17.5	10	Did not advance			
Marek Petrusewicz	200 metre breaststroke	2:44.0	19	Did not advance			
Gotfryd Gremlowski; Antoni Tołkaczewski; Józef Lewicki; Jerzy Boniecki	4 x 200 metre freestyle	9:13.7	13	Did not advance			

Women

Athlete	Event	Heat		Semifinal		Final	
Athlete	Event	Time	Rank	Time	Rank	Time	Rank
Irena Milnikiel	100 metre backstroke	1:25.5	19	Did not advance			
Aleksandra Mróz	200 metre breaststroke	DSQ		Did not advance			

== Weightlifting ==
Men

Athlete	Event	Military Press		Snatch		Clean & jerk		Total	Rank
Athlete	Event	Result	Rank	Result	Rank	Result	Rank	Total	Rank
Augustyn Dziedzic	56 kg	70	17	80	13	95	17	265	17
Henryk Skowronek	60 kg	77,5	22	85	21	110	19	272,5	21
Edward Ścigała	67.5 kg	77,5	23	90	21	120	19	290	21
Czesław Białas	82.5 kg	87,5	22	107,5	18	130	19	325	19

== Wrestling ==
Men's Greco-Roman

Athlete	Event	Elimination pool					Final round	
Athlete	Event	Round 1 Result	Round 2 Result	Round 3 Result	Round 4 Result	Round 5 Result	Final round Result	Rank
Rudolf Toboła	−57 kg	Artem Teryan (URS); L T 4:53	Pietro Lombardi (ITA); L 0–3	Did not advance				12
Ernest Gondzik	−62 kg	Vojislav Torma (YUG); W 2–1	Francisc Horvath (ROU); W 2–1	Imre Polyák (HUN); L 0–3	Did not advance			8
Zbigniew Szajewski	−67 kg	André Verdaine (FRA); L 0–3	Aristides Perez (GUA); W T 0:30	Mikuláš Athanasov (TCH); L WO	Did not advance			10
Antoni Gołaś	−73 kg	Ahmet Senol (TUR); L 0–3	Semyon Marushkin (URS); L 0–3	Did not advance				13
Bolesław Dubicki	−79 kg	Nikolay Belov (URS); L T 2:17	Gyula Nemeti (HUN); L T 8:26	Did not advance				9
