= Fencing at the 1952 Summer Olympics – Men's épée =

Olympic fencing event

Men's épée at the Games of the XV Olympiad
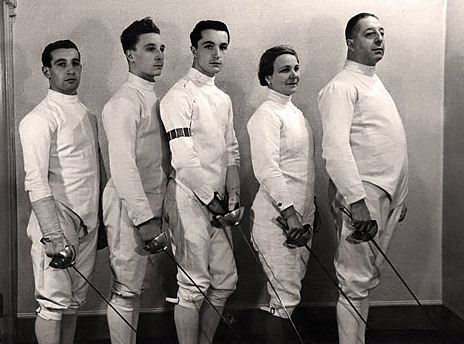
- The Mangiarotti family, including gold medalist Edoardo (center) and silver medalist Dario (left)
- Venue: Westend Tennis Hall, Espoo
- Dates: 27–28 July 1952
- Competitors: 76 from 29 nations

Medalists
1st place, gold medalist(s)		Edoardo Mangiarotti; Italy
2nd place, silver medalist(s)		Dario Mangiarotti; Italy
3rd place, bronze medalist(s)		Oswald Zappelli; Switzerland

The men's épée was one of seven fencing events on the fencing at the 1952 Summer Olympics programme. It was the eleventh appearance of the event. The competition was held from 27 July 1952 to 28 July 1952. 76 fencers from 29 nations competed. Nations were limited to three fencers each. The event was won by Edoardo Mangiarotti of Italy, the nation's fourth consecutive victory in the men's épée (passing France for most all-time). It was also the fourth consecutive year that Italy had at least two fencers on the podium in the event, as Edoardo's brother Dario Mangiarotti took silver. Bronze went to Oswald Zappelli of Switzerland. Zappelli and Edoardo Mangiarotti had faced each other in a barrage for silver and bronze medals in 1948, which Zappelli had won; the two men were the fifth and sixth to earn multiple medals in the event.

== Background ==
This was the 11th appearance of the event, which was not held at the first Games in 1896 (with only foil and sabre events held) but has been held at every Summer Olympics since 1900.

Four of the 10 finalists from the 1948 Games returned: silver medalist Oswald Zappelli of Switzerland, bronze medalist Edoardo Mangiarotti of Italy, eighth-place finisher Émile Gretsch of Luxembourg, and tenth-place finisher Ronald Parfitt of Great Britain. Also competing was Dario Mangiarotti, Edoardo's elder brother, part of the silver medal 1948 Italian team who had to withdraw from the individual event due to injury (his replacement, Luigi Cantone, won gold in the individual competition). The Mangiarotti brothers had each won a World Championship since the London Games, Dario in 1949 and Edoardo in 1951 (making him the reigning World Champion coming into the 1952 Olympics). The 1950 World Champion, Mogens Lüchow of Denmark, also competed.

Australia, Guatemala, Ireland, Japan, the Soviet Union, Venezuela, and Vietnam each made their debut in the event. Belgium and the United States each appeared for the 10th time, tied for most among nations.

== Competition format ==
The competition format was pool play round-robin, with bouts to three touches. Not all bouts were played in some pools if not necessary to determine advancement. Ties were broken through fence-off bouts ("barrages") in early rounds if necessary for determining advancement. Ties not necessary for advancement were either not broken (if at least one fencer had not finished all bouts in the round-robin) or broken first by touches received and then by touches scored. In the final, ties were broken by barrage if necessary for medal placement but otherwise first by touches received and then by touches scored.

Fencers from the four nations that reached the team event final received byes to the quarterfinals.

- Round 1: 8 pools of 8 fencers each. The top 4 fencers in each pool advanced to the quarterfinals.
- Quarterfinals: 5 pools between 8 and 9 fencers each. The top 4 fencers in each pool advanced to the semifinals.
- Semifinals: 2 pools of 10 fencers each. The top 5 fencers in each pool advanced to the final.
- Final: 1 pool of 10 fencers.

== Schedule ==
All times are Eastern European Summer Time (UTC+3)

Date	Time	Round
Sunday, 27 July 1952	8:00; 15:00	Round 1 Quarterfinals
Monday, 28 July 1952	8:00; 15:00	Semifinals; Final

== Results ==
=== Round 1 ===
The top 4 finishers in each pool advanced to round 2. Fencers from the four teams that advanced to the final of the men's team épée event received byes through round 1:

- Italy: Dario Mangiarotti, Edoardo Mangiarotti, and Carlo Pavesi
- Luxembourg: Léon Buck, Émile Gretsch, and Jean-Fernand Leischen
- Sweden: Per Carleson, Sven Fahlman, and Carl Forssell
- Switzerland: Paul Barth, Paul Meister, and Oswald Zappelli

==== Pool 1 ====
Rank	Fencer	Nation	Wins	Losses	TS	TR	Notes
1	Adam Krajewski	Poland	5	1		8	Q
1	Antonio Haro	Mexico	5	1		9	Q
3	Erkki Kerttula	Finland	4	2		10	Q
3	József Sákovics	Hungary	4	2		12	Q
5	Alfred Eriksen	Norway	2	4		14	
5	Gustavo Gutiérrez	Venezuela	2	4		16	
5	Robert Henrion	Belgium	2	4		16	
8	Eduardo López	Guatemala	0	6		18	

==== Pool 2 ====
Mourão and Meraz defeated Amaral in a three-way barrage for third and fourth place.

Rank	Fencer	Nation	Wins	Losses	TS	TR	Notes
1	Raimondo Carnera	Denmark	5	2		8	Q
2	Mohamed Abdel Rahman	Egypt	5	2		10	Q
3	Álvaro Mário Mourão	Portugal	4	3	16	13	Q
4	Emilio Meraz	Mexico	4	3	15	13	Q
5	Darío Amaral	Brazil	4	3		15	
6	Vito Simonetti	Argentina	2	5		16	
7	That Hải Tơn	Vietnam	2	5		19	
8	George Carpenter	Ireland	1	6		19	

==== Pool 3 ====
Rank	Fencer	Nation	Wins	Losses	TS	TR	Notes
1	Béla Rerrich	Hungary	5	2		10	Q
2	Allan Jay	Great Britain	4	3		9	Q
3	César Pekelman	Brazil	4	3		13	Q
4	Wojciech Rydz	Poland	4	3		14	Q
5	Yury Deksbakh	Soviet Union	3	4		13	
6	Vasile Chelaru	Romania	3	4		14	
7	Giovanni Bertorelli	Venezuela	1	6	10	19	
7	Patrick Duffy	Ireland	1	6	10	19	

==== Pool 4 ====
Przeździecki defeated Brooke in a barrage for fourth place.

Rank	Fencer	Nation	Wins	Losses	TS	TR	Notes
1	Mogens Lüchow	Denmark	5	1		7	Q
1	Jean-Baptiste Maquet	Belgium	5	2		11	Q
3	Edward Vebell	United States	4	2		12	Q
4	Andrzej Przeździecki	Poland	3	4		15	Q
5	Edward Brooke	Canada	3	4		14	
6	Santiago Massini	Argentina	2	5		16	
7	Zoltan Uray	Romania	1	6		18	
8	Charles Stanmore	Australia	1	6		19	

==== Pool 5 ====
Rank	Fencer	Nation	Wins	Losses	TS	TR	Notes
1	René Dybkær	Denmark	5	1		8	Q
1	Ivan Lund	Australia	5	2		14	Q
3	Johan von Koss	Norway	4	3		12	Q
4	Ghislain Delaunois	Belgium	4	3		13	Q
5	Armand Mouyal	France	3	4		15	
6	Enrique Rettberg	Argentina	2	4		13	
7	Abelardo Menéndez	Cuba	1	6	13	20	
8	Juozas Ūdras	Soviet Union	1	6	10	20	

==== Pool 6 ====
Kearney defeated Soberón and de Paula in a three-way barrage for fourth place.

Rank	Fencer	Nation	Wins	Losses	TS	TR	Notes
1	Álvaro Pinto	Portugal	6	1		9	Q
2	Claude Nigon	France	6	1		11	Q
3	Ronald Parfitt	Great Britain	4	3		16	Q
4	Tom Kearney	Ireland	3	4		17	Q
5	Rubén Soberón	Guatemala	3	4		14	
6	Walter de Paula	Brazil	3	4		15	
7	Lev Saychuk	Soviet Union	2	5		18	
8	Heikki Raitio	Finland	1	6		19	

==== Pool 7 ====
Bougnol defeated Camous, Skrobisch, and Kroggel in a four-way barrage for fourth place.

Rank	Fencer	Nation	Wins	Losses	TS	TR	Notes
1	Barnabás Berzsenyi	Hungary	4	3	19	14	Q
2	Rolf Wiik	Finland	4	3	18	14	Q
3	Benito Ramos	Mexico	4	3		17	Q
4	René Bougnol	France	3	4		14	Q
5	Juan Camous	Venezuela	3	4		15	
6	Alfred Skrobisch	United States	3	4		15	
7	Erwin Kroggel	Germany	3	4		15	
8	Shinichi Maki	Japan	1	6		20	

==== Pool 8 ====
Dias and Fethers defeated Makler in a three-way barrage for third and fourth place.

Rank	Fencer	Nation	Wins	Losses	TS	TR	Notes
1	Nicolae Marinescu	Romania	5	2		13	Q
2	Egill Knutzen	Norway	4	3		13	Q
3	Carlos Dias	Portugal	3	4		17	Q
3	John Fethers	Australia	3	4		17	Q
5	Paul Makler Sr.	United States	3	4		14	
6	René Paul	Great Britain	2	5		18	
7	Antonio Chocano	Guatemala	1	6	13	19	
8	Roland Asselin	Canada	1	6	12	19	

=== Quarterfinals ===
The top 4 finishers in each pool advanced to the semifinals.

==== Quarterfinal 1 ====
Rank	Fencer	Nation	Wins	Losses	TS	TR	Notes
1	Dario Mangiarotti	Italy	6	1		8	Q
2	Sven Fahlman	Sweden	6	2		12	Q
3	Jean-Baptiste Maquet	Belgium	5	2		11	Q
4	René Bougnol	France	5	3		19	Q
5	Antonio Haro	Mexico	4	4		18	
6	César Pekelman	Brazil	3	5		18	
7	Nicolae Marinescu	Romania	3	5		20	
8	Wojciech Rydz	Poland	2	5		17	
9	Álvaro Pinto	Portugal	0	7		21	

==== Quarterfinal 2 ====
Rank	Fencer	Nation	Wins	Losses	TS	TR	Notes
1	Edoardo Mangiarotti	Italy	5	2		9	Q
2	Allan Jay	Great Britain	5	2		10	Q
3	Edward Vebell	United States	4	3		13	Q
4	Álvaro Mário Mourão	Portugal	4	3		15	Q
5	Emilio Meraz	Mexico	3	4		15	
6	Claude Nigon	France	3	4		17	
7	Béla Rerrich	Hungary	2	5		18	
8	Paul Meister	Hungary	1	6		20	

==== Quarterfinal 3 ====
Dybkær defeated Barth in a barrage for fourth place.

Rank	Fencer	Nation	Wins	Losses	TS	TR	Notes
1	Carlo Pavesi	Italy	5	1		4	Q
1	Léon Buck	Luxembourg	5	1		8	Q
1	Mohamed Abdel Rahman	Egypt	5	3		14	Q
4	René Dybkær	Denmark	4	4		19	Q
5	Paul Barth	Switzerland	4	4		14	
6	Johan von Koss	Norway	2	5		17	
7	Andrzej Przeździecki	Poland	2	5		19	
8	Ivan Lund	Australia	1	6		19	
9	Carlos Dias	Portugal	1	6		20	

==== Quarterfinal 4 ====
Forssell defeated Delaunois and Berzsenyi in a three-way barrage for fourth place.

Rank	Fencer	Nation	Wins	Losses	TS	TR	Notes
1	Émile Gretsch	Luxembourg	5	3		14	Q
2	Rolf Wiik	Finland	5	3	20	16	Q
3	Mogens Lüchow	Denmark	5	3	20	16	Q
4	Carl Forssell	Sweden	4	4		16	Q
5	Ghislain Delaunois	Belgium	4	4	22	17	
6	Barnabás Berzsenyi	Hungary	4	4	23	17	
7	Ronald Parfitt	Great Britain	3	5		19	
8	Adam Krajewski	Poland	3	5		20	

==== Quarterfinal 5 ====
Sákovics and Zappelli defeated Fethers in a three-way barrage for third and fourth place.

Rank	Fencer	Nation	Wins	Losses	TS	TR	Notes
1	Erkki Kerttula	Finland	6	1		7	Q
2	Per Carleson	Sweden	5	2		12	Q
3	József Sákovics	Hungary	4	4		15	Q
4	Oswald Zappelli	Switzerland	4	4		15	Q
5	John Fethers	Australia	4	4		17	
6	Raimondo Carnera	Denmark	3	5		19	
7	Egill Knutzen	Finland	2	5		16	
8	Jean-Fernand Leischen	Luxembourg	2	5		17	
9	Tom Kearney	Ireland	2	6		20	

=== Semifinals ===
The top 5 finishers in each pool advanced to the final.

==== Semifinal 1 ====
Rank	Fencer	Nation	Wins	Losses	TS	TR	Notes
1	Edoardo Mangiarotti	Italy	9	0	27	4	Q
2	Erkki Kerttula	Finland	6	3		12	Q
3	Oswald Zappelli	Switzerland	6	3		16	Q
4	Carl Forssell	Sweden	5	4		16	Q
5	Carlo Pavesi	Italy	5	4		20	Q
6	Sven Fahlman	Sweden	4	5		20	
7	René Dybkær	Denmark	2	6		20	
7	Émile Gretsch	Luxembourg	2	6		21	
9	Álvaro Mário Mourão	Portugal	2	7		22	
10	Jean-Baptiste Maquet	Belgium	1	8		25	

==== Semifinal 2 ====
Rank	Fencer	Nation	Wins	Losses	TS	TR	Notes
1	Mogens Lüchow	Denmark	7	2		12	Q
2	Per Carleson	Sweden	6	3		12	Q
3	Dario Mangiarotti	Italy	6	3		15	Q
4	József Sákovics	Hungary	6	3		18	Q
5	Léon Buck	Luxembourg	5	4		16	Q
6	Allan Jay	Great Britain	4	5		18	
7	Mohamed Abdel Rahman	Egypt	4	5		19	
8	Rolf Wiik	Finland	4	5		22	
9	Edward Vebell	United States	3	6		21	
10	René Bougnol	France	0	9		27	

=== Final ===
There was a three-way barrage for silver, bronze, and fourth place. D. Mangiarotti came out best in that barrage, followed by Zappelli and then Buck.

Rank	Fencer	Nation	Wins	Losses	TS	TR
1st place, gold medalist(s)	Edoardo Mangiarotti	Italy	7	2		12
2nd place, silver medalist(s)	Dario Mangiarotti	Italy	6	3		16
3rd place, bronze medalist(s)	Oswald Zappelli	Switzerland	6	3		18
4	Léon Buck	Luxembourg	6	3		19
5	József Sákovics	Hungary	5	4		17
6	Carlo Pavesi	Italy	4	5		21
7	Per Carleson	Sweden	3	6		20
8	Carl Forssell	Sweden	3	6		23
9	Erkki Kerttula	Finland	2	7		23
10	Mogens Lüchow	Denmark	2	7		25
