= Fencing at the 1952 Summer Olympics – Men's team épée =

Men's team épée at the Games of the XV Olympiad
- Venue: Westend Tennis Hall, Espoo
- Dates: 25–26 July 1952
- Competitors: 98 from 19 nations

Medalists
1st place, gold medalist(s)		Edoardo Mangiarotti; Dario Mangiarotti; Giuseppe Delfino; Carlo Pavesi; Franco Bertinetti; Roberto Battaglia	Italy
2nd place, silver medalist(s)		Per Carleson; Carl Forssell; Bengt Ljungquist; Berndt-Otto Rehbinder; Sven Fahlman; Lennart Magnusson	Sweden
3rd place, bronze medalist(s)		Otto Rüfenacht; Paul Meister; Oswald Zappelli; Paul Barth; Willy Fitting; Mario Valota	Switzerland

The men's team épée was one of seven fencing events on the fencing at the 1952 Summer Olympics programme. It was the ninth appearance of the event. The competition was held from 25 July 1952, to 26 July 1952. 98 fencers from 19 nations competed.

== Results ==
Source: Official results; and Sports Reference

=== Round 1 ===
The top two nations in each pool advanced to the quarter-finals.

Pool 1
Rank	Nation	Wins	Losses	Bouts Won	Bouts Lost
1	Sweden	1	0	9	0
2	Great Britain	1	0	10	6
3	Poland	0	2	6	19

Pool 2
Rank	Nation	Wins	Losses	Bouts Won	Bouts Lost
1	Italy	1	0	8	4
2	United States	1	0	8	8
3	Soviet Union	0	2	12	16

Pool 3
Rank	Nation	Wins	Losses	Bouts Won	Bouts Lost
1	Hungary	1	0	14	1
2	Switzerland	1	0	8	2
3	Brazil	0	2	3	22

Pool 4
Rank	Nation	Wins	Losses	Bouts Won	Bouts Lost
1	Belgium	2	0	20	10
2	Denmark	2	0	17	9
3	Portugal	0	2	10	17
4	Venezuela	0	2	9	20

Pool 5
Rank	Nation	Wins	Losses	Bouts Won	Bouts Lost
1	Finland	1	0	11	4
2	Luxembourg	1	0	8	3
3	Australia	0	2	7	19

Pool 6
Rank	Nation	Wins	Losses	Bouts Won	Bouts Lost
1	France	1	0	8	3
2	Norway	1	0	8	6
3	Egypt	0	2	11	16

=== Quarter-finals ===
The top two nations in each pool advanced to the semi-finals.

Pool 1
Rank	Nation	Wins	Losses	Bouts Won	Bouts Lost
1	Hungary	3	0	31	12
2	Luxembourg	2	1	23	22
3	France	1	2	19	15
4	Finland	0	3	16	30

Pool 2
Rank	Nation	Wins	Losses	Bouts Won	Bouts Lost
1	Italy	2	0	20	4
2	Switzerland	2	0	15	10
3	Belgium	0	2	8	15
4	Norway	0	2	6	20

Pool 3
Rank	Nation	Wins	Losses	Bouts Won	Bouts Lost
1	Sweden	2	1	30	15
2	Denmark	2	1	19	28
3	Great Britain	1	2	23	24
4	United States	1	2	20	25

=== Semifinals ===
The top two nations in each pool advanced to the final.

Pool 1
Rank	Nation	Wins	Losses	Bouts Won	Bouts Lost
1	Luxembourg	1	0	10	5
2	Italy	1	0	8	7
3	Denmark	0	2	12	18

Pool B
Rank	Nation	Wins	Losses	Bouts Won	Bouts Lost
1	Switzerland	1	1	18	12
2	Sweden	1	1	14	15
3	Hungary	1	1	13	18

=== Final ===
The final was a round-robin.

Rank	Nation	Wins	Losses	Bouts Won	Bouts Lost
1st place, gold medalist(s)	Italy	3	0	32	11
2nd place, silver medalist(s)	Sweden	2	1	26	17
3rd place, bronze medalist(s)	Switzerland	1	2	18	24
4	Luxembourg	0	3	9	33

Results

- Italy 8-5 Sweden
- Italy 12-4 Switzerland
- Italy 12-2 Luxembourg
- Sweden 8-6 Switzerland
- Sweden 13-3 Luxembourg
- Switzerland 8-4 Luxembourg

== Rosters ==
Australia

- Jock Gibson
- Charles Stanmore
- John Fethers
- Ivan Lund

Belgium

- Ghislain Delaunois
- Jean-Baptiste Maquet
- Albert Bernard
- Robert Henrion
- Paul Valcke

Brazil

- Darío Amaral
- César Pekelman
- Walter de Paula
- Helio Vieira

Denmark

- Raimondo Carnera
- Erik Swane Lund
- René Dybkær
- Mogens Lüchow
- Ib Nielsen
- Jakob Lyng

Egypt

- Osman Abdel Hafeez
- Salah Dessouki
- Mahmoud Younes
- Mohamed Abdel Rahman

Finland

- Kauko Jalkanen
- Erkki Kerttula
- Rolf Wiik
- Nils Sjöblom
- Jaakko Vuorinen
- Paavo Miettinen

France

- Jean-Pierre Muller
- Armand Mouyal
- Daniel Dagallier
- René Bougnol
- Gérard Rousset
- Claude Nigon

Great Britain

- René Paul
- Allan Jay
- Christopher Grose-Hodge
- Ronald Parfitt
- Raymond Harrison
- Charles de Beaumont

Hungary

- Lajos Balthazár
- Barnabás Berzsenyi
- Béla Rerrich
- József Sákovics
- Imre Hennyei

Italy

- Edoardo Mangiarotti
- Dario Mangiarotti
- Giuseppe Delfino
- Carlo Pavesi
- Franco Bertinetti
- Roberto Battaglia

Luxembourg

- Émile Gretsch
- Jean-Fernand Leischen
- Paul Anen
- Léon Buck

Norway

- Egill Knutzen
- Alfred Eriksen
- Johan von Koss
- Sverre Gillebo

Poland

- Andrzej Przeździecki
- Wojciech Rydz
- Jan Nawrocki
- Adam Krajewski
- Zygmunt Grodner

Portugal

- Álvaro Pinto
- Carlos Dias
- Álvaro Mário Mourão
- Francisco Uva
- João Costa

Soviet Union

- Genrikh Bulgakov
- Juozas Ūdras
- Lev Saychuk
- Yury Deksbakh
- Ak'ak'i Meipariani

Sweden

- Per Carleson
- Carl Forssell
- Bengt Ljungquist
- Berndt-Otto Rehbinder
- Sven Fahlman
- Lennart Magnusson

Switzerland

- Otto Rüfenacht
- Paul Meister
- Oswald Zappelli
- Paul Barth
- Willy Fitting
- Mario Valota

United States

- Edward Vebell
- Paul Makler Sr.
- Alfred Skrobisch
- Joe de Capriles
- James Strauch
- Albert Wolff

Venezuela

- Gustavo Gutiérrez
- Giovanni Bertorelli
- Olaf Sandner
- Juan Camous
