= Fencing at the 1948 Summer Olympics – Women's foil =

Olympic fencing tournament

Women's foil at the Games of the XIV Olympiad
- Venue: Wembley Palace of Engineering, London
- Dates: 31 July – 2 August 1948
- Competitors: 39 from 15 nations

Medalists
1st place, gold medalist(s)		Ilona Elek-Schacherer	Hungary
2nd place, silver medalist(s)		Karen Lachmann	Denmark
3rd place, bronze medalist(s)		Ellen Müller-Preis	Austria

The women's foil was one of seven fencing events on the fencing at the 1948 Summer Olympics programme. It was the fifth appearance of the event. The competition was held from 31 July 1948 to 2 August 1948. 39 fencers from 15 nations competed.

The competition format was pool play round-robin, with bouts to four touches. Not all bouts were played in some pools if not necessary to determine advancement. Ties were broken through fence-off bouts ("barrages") in early rounds if necessary for determining advancement, but by touches received in final rounds (and for non-advancement-necessary placing in earlier rounds).

== Results ==
=== Round 1 ===
The top 4 finishers in each pool advanced to round 2.

==== Pool 1 ====
Rank	Fencer	Nation	Wins	Losses	Notes
1	Maria Cerra	United States	5	1	Q
2	Anna Klüpfel	Switzerland	4	2	Q
3	Éva Kun	Hungary	4	2	Q
4	Grete Olsen	Denmark	3	2	Q
5	Mary Meyer-van der Sluis	Netherlands	2	4	
6	Irena Nawrocka	Poland	2	4	
7	Dorothy Dermody	Ireland	0	6	

==== Pool 2 ====
Rank	Fencer	Nation	Wins	Losses	Notes
1	Karen Lachmann	Denmark	6	0	Q
2	Renée Garilhe	France	5	1	Q
3	Irene Camber-Corno	Italy	3	3	Q
4	Fritzi Wenisch-Filz	Austria	3	3	Q
5	Anja Secrève	Netherlands	2	4	
6	Nadia Haro Oliva	Mexico	2	4	
7	Emilie Schwindt	Belgium	0	6	

==== Pool 3 ====
Minton defeated Martin and Fullone in a three-way barrage for fourth place.

Rank	Fencer	Nation	Wins	Losses	Notes
1	Ilona Elek-Schacherer	Hungary	5	0	Q
2	Jan York-Romary	United States	4	1	Q
3	Jenny Addams	Belgium	3	2	Q
4	Gytte Minton	Great Britain	1	4	Q
5	Rhoda Martin	Canada	1	4	
6	Nélida Fullone	Argentina	1	4	

==== Pool 4 ====
Rank	Fencer	Nation	Wins	Losses	Notes
1	Gabriele Zeilinger	Austria	4	1	Q
2	Françoise Gouny	France	3	2	Q
3	Kate Mahaut	Denmark	3	2	Q
4	Velleda Cesari	Italy	3	2	Q
5	Enriqueta Mayora	Mexico	2	3	
6	Betty Hamilton	Canada	0	5	

==== Pool 5 ====
Rank	Fencer	Nation	Wins	Losses	Notes
1	Margit Elek	Hungary	4	1	Q
2	Louisette Malherbaud	France	3	1	Q
3	Elena Libera	Italy	3	1	Q
4	Elsa Irigoyen	Argentina	2	3	Q
5	Betty Carnegy-Arbuthnott	Great Britain	1	4	
6	Victoria Hagemann	Switzerland	1	4	

==== Pool 6 ====
Dow defeated Rieder in a barrage for fourth place.

Rank	Fencer	Nation	Wins	Losses	Notes
1	Ellen Müller-Preis	Austria	5	1	Q
2	Mary Glen-Haig	Great Britain	5	1	Q
3	Irma de Antequeda	Argentina	4	2	Q
4	Helena Dow	United States	3	3	Q
5	Hedwig Rieder	Switzerland	3	3	
6	Adèle Christiaens	Belgium	1	5	
7	Emma Ruíz	Mexico	0	6	

=== Round 2 ===
The top 3 finishers in each pool advanced to the semifinals.

==== Pool 1 ====
Rank	Fencer	Nation	Wins	Losses	Notes
1	Maria Cerra	United States	4	1	Q
2	Jenny Addams	Belgium	4	1	Q
3	Gytte Minton	Great Britain	3	2	Q
4	Irma de Antequeda	Argentina	2	3	
5	Louisette Malherbaud	France	2	3	
6	Gabriele Zeilinger	Austria	0	5	

==== Pool 2 ====
Elek-Schacherer and Wenisch-Filz defeated Garilhe in a three-way barrage for second and third place.

Rank	Fencer	Nation	Wins	Losses	Notes
1	Mary Glen-Haig	Great Britain	5	0	Q
2	Ilona Elek-Schacherer	Hungary	3	2	Q
3	Fritzi Wenisch-Filz	Austria	3	2	Q
4	Renée Garilhe	France	3	2	
5	Elena Libera	Italy	0	4	
5	Kate Mahaut	Denmark	0	4	

==== Pool 3 ====
Minton defeated Martin and Fullone in a three-way barrage for fourth place.

Rank	Fencer	Nation	Wins	Losses	Notes
1	Ellen Müller-Preis	Austria	4	1	Q
2	Margit Elek	Hungary	4	1	Q
3	Irene Camber-Corno	Italy	3	2	Q
4	Grete Olsen	Denmark	2	3	
5	Françoise Gouny	France	1	4	
6	Helena Dow	United States	1	4	

==== Pool 4 ====
Cesari defeated York-Romary in a barrage for third place.

Rank	Fencer	Nation	Wins	Losses	Notes
1	Karen Lachmann	Denmark	4	1	Q
2	Éva Kun	Hungary	4	1	Q
3	Velleda Cesari	Italy	3	2	Q
4	Jan York-Romary	United States	3	2	
5	Elsa Irigoyen	Argentina	1	4	
6	Anna Klüpfel	Switzerland	0	5	

=== Semifinals ===
The top 4 finishers in each pool advanced to the final.

==== Semifinal 1 ====
Wenisch-Filz defeated Camber-Corno in a barrage for fourth place.

Rank	Fencer	Nation	Wins	Losses	Notes
1	Ilona Elek-Schacherer	Hungary	5	0	Q
2	Karen Lachmann	Denmark	3	2	Q
3	Mary Glen-Haig	Great Britain	3	2	Q
4	Fritzi Wenisch-Filz	Austria	2	3	Q
5	Irene Camber-Corno	Italy	2	3	
6	Éva Kun	Hungary	0	5	

==== Semifinal 2 ====
Elek-Schacherer and Wenisch-Filz defeated Garilhe in a three-way barrage for second and third place.

Rank	Fencer	Nation	Wins	Losses	Notes
1	Ellen Müller-Preis	Austria	4	1	Q
2	Maria Cerra	United States	3	2	Q
2	Velleda Cesari	Italy	3	2	Q
4	Margit Elek	Hungary	3	2	Q
5	Jenny Addams	Belgium	2	3	
6	Gytte Minton	Great Britain	0	5	

=== Final ===
The final resulted in two different three-way ties in the standings: second, third, and fourth place at 5–2 and sixth, seventh, and eighth place at 1–6. Elek-Schacherer took gold with a 6–1 final record, losing only to fifth-place finished Wenisch-Filz. Lachmann took silver, with only 11 touches received compared to 16 each for Müller-Preis and Cerra. Müller-Preis then took bronze, on the strength of one more touch scored (24 to Cerra's 23). The other tie was broken similarly; Elek finished sixth with 26 touches received to Cesari and Glen-Haig's 27 apiece, while Cesari prevailed over Glen-Haig due to her 15 touches scored to the latter's 10.

Rank	Fencer	Nation	Wins	Losses	TS	TR
1st place, gold medalist(s)	Ilona Elek-Schacherer	Hungary	6	1	27	15
2nd place, silver medalist(s)	Karen Lachmann	Denmark	5	2	24	11
3rd place, bronze medalist(s)	Ellen Müller-Preis	Austria	5	2	24	16
4	Maria Cerra	United States	5	2	23	16
5	Fritzi Wenisch-Filz	Austria	4	3	20	21
6	Margit Elek	Hungary	1	6	16	26
7	Velleda Cesari	Italy	1	6	15	27
8	Mary Glen-Haig	Great Britain	1	6	10	27
