= Fencing at the 1952 Summer Olympics – Women's foil =

Olympic fencing event

Women's foil at the Games of the XV Olympiad
- Venue: Westend Tennis Hall, Espoo
- Dates: 26–27 July 1952
- Competitors: 37 from 15 nations

Medalists
1st place, gold medalist(s)		Irene Camber-Corno	Italy
2nd place, silver medalist(s)		Ilona Schachererné Elek	Hungary
3rd place, bronze medalist(s)		Karen Lachmann	Denmark

The women's foil was one of seven fencing events on the fencing at the 1952 Summer Olympics programme. It was the sixth appearance of the event. The competition was held from 26 July 1952 to 27 July 1952. 37 fencers from 15 nations competed.

== Competition format ==
The competition format was pool play round-robin, with bouts to four touches except in the final where bouts were to five touches. Not all bouts were played in some pools if not necessary to determine advancement. Ties were broken through fence-off bouts ("barrages") in early rounds if necessary for determining advancement. Ties not necessary for advancement were either not broken (if at least one fencer had not finished all bouts in the round-robin) or broken first by touches received and then by touches scored. In the final, ties were broken by barrage if necessary for medal placement but otherwise first by touches received and then by touches scored.

== Results ==
=== Round 1 ===
The top 4 finishers in each pool advanced to round 2.

==== Pool 1 ====
Garilhe and Sheen defeated Cesari in a three-way barrage for third and fourth place.

Rank	Fencer	Nation	Wins	Losses	TS	TR	Notes
1	Lilo Allgayer	Germany	5	0	20	10	Q
2	Margit Elek	Hungary	3	2		14	Q
3	Renée Garilhe	France	2	3	16	15	Q
3	Gillian Sheen	Great Britain	2	3	13	15	Q
5	Velleda Cesari	Italy	2	3	13	15	
6	Maria Sołtan	Poland	1	4		17	

==== Pool 2 ====
Buller and Shitikova defeated Kalka in a three-way barrage for third and fourth place.

Rank	Fencer	Nation	Wins	Losses	TS	TR	Notes
1	Karen Lachmann	Denmark	4	1		8	Q
2	Irene Camber-Corno	Italy	4	1		9	Q
3	Patricia Buller	Great Britain	3	3		17	Q
4	Nadezhda Shitikova	Soviet Union	3	3		18	Q
5	Maggie Kalka	Finland	3	3		18	
6	Ursula Selle	Venezuela	2	4		24	
7	Wanda Włodarczyk	Poland	1	5		21	

==== Pool 3 ====
Mitchell defeated Barding-Poulsen in a barrage for fourth place.

Rank	Fencer	Nation	Wins	Losses	TS	TR	Notes
1	Grete Kunz	Austria	4	1	19	11	Q
2	Anna Ponomaryova	Soviet Union	4	1	18	11	Q
3	Magdolna Nyári-Kovács	Hungary	3	2		11	Q
4	Maxine Mitchell	United States	2	3		15	Q
5	Ulla Barding-Poulsen	Denmark	2	3		16	
6	Patricia Norford	Australia	0	5		20	

==== Pool 4 ====
Rank	Fencer	Nation	Wins	Losses	TS	TR	Notes
1	Irena Nawrocka	Poland	3	1		7	Q
2	Silvia Strukel	Italy	3	2		11	Q
3	Mary Glen-Haig	Great Britain	3	2		13	Q
4	Polly Craus	United States	3	2		14	Q
5	Hedwig Rieder	Denmark	1	3		14	
6	Kate Mahaut	Denmark	1	4		17	

==== Pool 5 ====
Rank	Fencer	Nation	Wins	Losses	TS	TR	Notes
1	Jan York-Romary	United States	4	0	20	5	Q
2	Ellen Müller-Preis	Austria	3	1		7	Q
2	Lylian Lecomte-Guyonneau	France	3	2		12	Q
4	Appolinariya Plekhanova	Soviet Union	2	2		12	Q
5	Catherine Pym	Australia	1	4		16	
6	Taimi Mattsson	Finland	0	4		16	

==== Pool 6 ====
Rank	Fencer	Nation	Wins	Losses	TS	TR	Notes
1	Ilona Schachererné Elek	Hungary	4	0	16	3	Q
2	Odette Drand	France	3	1		6	Q
3	Elsa Irigoyen	Argentina	3	2		12	Q
4	Fritzi Wenisch-Filz	Austria	3	2		13	Q
5	Gerda Muller	Venezuela	0	4		16	
5	Marianne Sjöblom	Finland	0	4		16	

=== Round 2 ===
The top 4 finishers in each pool advanced to the semifinals.

==== Pool 1 ====
Garilhe and Sheen defeated Cesari in a three-way barrage for third and fourth place.

Rank	Fencer	Nation	Wins	Losses	TS	TR	Notes
1	Ilona Schachererné Elek	Hungary	5	0	20	8	Q
2	Irene Camber-Corno	Italy	4	1		9	Q
3	Polly Craus	United States	2	3		17	Q
4	Grete Kunz	Austria	2	3		18	Q
5	Nadezhda Shitikova	Soviet Union	1	4	14	18	
6	Gillian Sheen	Great Britain	1	4	13	18	

==== Pool 2 ====
Rank	Fencer	Nation	Wins	Losses	TS	TR	Notes
1	Appolinariya Plekhanova	Soviet Union	5	0	20	9	Q
2	Magdolna Nyári-Kovács	Hungary	3	1		9	Q
3	Lilo Allgayer	Germany	3	1		11	Q
4	Silvia Strukel	Italy	2	3		16	Q
5	Odette Drand	France	1	4		19	
6	Patricia Buller	Great Britain	0	5		20	

==== Pool 3 ====
Wenisch-Filz and Lecomte-Guyonneau defeated Elek and Ponomaryova in a four-way barrage for third and fourth place.

Rank	Fencer	Nation	Wins	Losses	TS	TR	Notes
1	Karen Lachmann	Denmark	4	1		11	Q
2	Maxine Mitchell	United States	3	2		12	Q
3	Fritzi Wenisch-Filz	Austria	2	3		18	Q
4	Lylian Lecomte-Guyonneau	France	2	3		16	Q
5	Margit Elek	Hungary	2	3		13	
6	Anna Ponomaryova	Soviet Union	2	3		16	

==== Pool 4 ====
Glen-Haig defeated Nawrocka in a barrage for fourth place.

Rank	Fencer	Nation	Wins	Losses	TS	TR	Notes
1	Jan York-Romary	United States	4	1		12	Q
1	Renée Garilhe	France	3	1		10	Q
3	Ellen Müller-Preis	Austria	3	2		16	Q
4	Mary Glen-Haig	Great Britain	2	3		17	Q
5	Irena Nawrocka	Poland	2	3		18	
6	Elsa Irigoyen	Argentina	0	4		16	

=== Semifinals ===
The top 4 finishers in each pool advanced to the final.

==== Semifinal 1 ====
Garilhe and Sheen defeated Cesari in a three-way barrage for third and fourth place.

Rank	Fencer	Nation	Wins	Losses	TS	TR	Notes
1	Karen Lachmann	Denmark	7	0	28	9	Q
2	Lylian Lecomte-Guyonneau	France	5	2		18	Q
3	Jan York-Romary	United States	4	3		19	Q
4	Magdolna Nyári-Kovács	Hungary	4	3		21	Q
5	Silvia Strukel	Italy	3	4		19	
6	Ellen Müller-Preis	Austria	3	4		20	
7	Polly Craus	United States	1	6		25	
8	Grete Kunz	Austria	1	6		27	

==== Semifinal 2 ====
Rank	Fencer	Nation	Wins	Losses	TS	TR	Notes
1	Ilona Schachererné Elek	Hungary	6	0	24	6	Q
2	Renée Garilhe	France	5	1		9	Q
2	Maxine Mitchell	United States	5	2		19	Q
4	Irene Camber-Corno	Italy	4	3		18	Q
5	Mary Glen-Haig	Great Britain	2	4		20	
6	Lilo Allgayer	Germany	2	5		24	
7	Fritzi Wenisch-Filz	Austria	1	5		20	
8	Appolinariya Plekhanova	Soviet Union	1	6		27	

=== Final ===
Two separate barrages were necessary. There was a four-way barrage for the bronze medal, which was won by Lachmann. The top two fencers ended in a barrage for gold and silver; Camber defeated Elek 4–3.

Rank	Fencer	Nation	Wins	Losses	TS	TR
1st place, gold medalist(s)	Irene Camber-Corno	Italy	5	2		22
2nd place, silver medalist(s)	Ilona Schachererné Elek	Hungary	5	2		21
3rd place, bronze medalist(s)	Karen Lachmann	Denmark	4	3		22
4	Jan York-Romary	United States	4	3		25
5	Maxine Mitchell	United States	4	3		23
6	Renée Garilhe	France	4	3		24
7	Lylian Lecomte-Guyonneau	France	1	6		30
8	Magdolna Nyári-Kovács	Hungary	1	6		32
