= Fencing at the 1952 Summer Olympics =

Fencing at the Games of the XV Olympiad

At the 1952 Summer Olympics, seven fencing events were contested, six for men and one for women.

== Medal summary ==
=== Men's events ===
Event	Gold	Silver	Bronze
individual épée	Edoardo Mangiarotti; Italy	Dario Mangiarotti; Italy	Oswald Zappelli; Switzerland
team épée	Italy; Roberto Battaglia; Carlo Pavesi; Franco Bertinetti; Giuseppe Delfino; Dario Mangiarotti; Edoardo Mangiarotti	Sweden; Berndt-Otto Rehbinder; Bengt Ljungquist; Per Hjalmar Carleson; Carl Forssell; Sven Fahlman; Lennart Magnusson	Switzerland; Otto Rüfenacht; Paul Meister; Oswald Zappelli; Paul Barth; Willy Fitting; Mario Valota
individual foil	Christian d'Oriola; France	Edoardo Mangiarotti; Italy	Manlio Di Rosa; Italy
team foil	France; Christian d'Oriola; Jacques Lataste; Jehan Buhan; Claude Netter; Jacques Noël; Adrien Rommel	Italy; Giancarlo Bergamini; Antonio Spallino; Manlio Di Rosa; Giorgio Pellini; Edoardo Mangiarotti; Renzo Nostini	Hungary; Endre Palócz; Tibor Berczelly; Endre Tilli; Aladár Gerevich; Jozsef Sakovics; Lajos Maszlay
individual sabre	Pál Kovács; Hungary	Aladár Gerevich; Hungary	Tibor Berczelly; Hungary
team sabre	Hungary; Bertalan Papp; László Rajcsányi; Rudolf Kárpáti; Tibor Berczelly; Aladár Gerevich; Pál Kovács	Italy; Giorgio Pellini; Vincenzo Pinton; Renzo Nostini; Mauro Racca; Gastone Darè; Roberto Ferrari	France; Maurice Piot; Jacques Lefèvre; Bernard Morel; Jean Laroyenne; Jean Francois Tournon; Jean Levavasseur

=== Women's events ===
Event	Gold	Silver	Bronze
individual foil	Irene Camber; Italy	Ilona Elek; Hungary	Karen Lachmann; Denmark

== Medal table ==
Rank	Nation	Gold	Silver	Bronze	Total
1	Italy	3	4	1	8
2	Hungary	2	2	2	6
3	France	2	0	1	3
4	Sweden	0	1	0	1
5	Switzerland	0	0	2	2
6	Denmark	0	0	1	1
Totals (6 entries)		7	7	7	21

== Participating nations ==
A total of 286 fencers (249 men and 37 women) from 32 nations competed at the Helsinki Games:

- Argentina (11)
- Austria (8)
- Australia (6)
- Belgium (14)
- Brazil (5)
- Canada (2)
- Cuba (1)
- Denmark (12)
- Egypt (8)
- Finland (11)
- France (21)
- Germany (9)
- Great Britain (17)
- Guatemala (3)
- Hungary (17)
- Ireland (4)
- Italy (18)
- Japan (1)
- Luxembourg (4)
- Mexico (4)
- Norway (5)
- Poland (13)
- Portugal (10)
- Romania (8)
- Saar (5)
- Soviet Union (16)
- Sweden (10)
- Switzerland (10)
- United States (20)
- Uruguay (2)
- Venezuela (10)
- Vietnam (1)
