= Switzerland at the 1952 Summer Olympics =

- IOC code: SUI
- NOC: Swiss Olympic Association

in Helsinki
- Competitors: 157 (148 men and 9 women) in 17 sports
- Flag bearer: Walter Lehmann
- Medals Ranked 11th: Gold 2 Silver 6 Bronze 6 Total 14

Summer Olympics appearances (overview)
- 1896; 1900; ~~1904~~; 1908; 1912; 1920; 1924; 1928; 1932; 1936; 1948; 1952; 1956; 1960; 1964; 1968; 1972; 1976; 1980; 1984; 1988; 1992; 1996; 2000; 2004; 2008; 2012; 2016; 2020; 2024; 2028

Other related appearances
- 1906 Intercalated Games

Switzerland competed at the 1952 Summer Olympics in Helsinki, Finland. 157 competitors, 148 men and 9 women, took part in 96 events in 17 sports.

== Gold ==
- Jack Günthard — Gymnastics, Men's Horizontal Bar
- Hans Eugster — Gymnastics, Men's Parallel Bars

== Silver ==
- Fritz Schwab — Athletics, Men's 10 km Walk
- Henri Chammartin, Gustav Fischer, and Gottfried Trachsel — Equestrian, Dressage Team Competition
- Josef Stalder — Gymnastics, Men's Horizontal Bar
- Hans Eugster, Ernst Fivian, Ernst Gebendinger, Jack Günthard, Hans Schwarzentruber, Josef Stalder, Melchior Thalmann, and Jean Tschabold — Gymnastics, Men's Combined Exercises
- Rico Bianchi, Émile Ess, Walter Leiser, Heini Scheller, and Karl Weidmann — Rowing, Men's Coxed Fours
- Robert Bürchler — Shooting, Men's Free Rifle, Three Positions

== Bronze ==
- Oswald Zappelli — Fencing, Men's Épée Individual Competition
- Paul Barth, Willy Fitting, Paul Meister, Otto Rüfenacht, Mario Valota, and Oswald Zappelli — Fencing, Men's Épée Team Competition
- Josef Stalder — Gymnastics, Men's All-Around Individual
- Josef Stalder — Gymnastics, Men's Parallel Bars
- Hans Eugster — Gymnastics, Men's Rings
- Hans Kalt and Kurt Schmid — Rowing, Men's Coxless Pairs

== Basketball ==
Men's Team Competition

- Qualification Round (Group A)

- Lost to Bulgaria (58-69)
- Lost to Belgium (49-59) → did not advance

== Cycling ==
Road Competition

Men's Individual Road Race (190.4 km)

- Rolf Graf — 5:12:45.3 (→ 17th place)
- Fausto Lurati — 5:24:58.0 (→ 50th place)
- Kobi Scherer — did not finish (→ no ranking)

Track Competition

Men's 1.000m Time Trial

- Fredy Arber

- Final — 1:15.4 (→ 15th place)

Men's 1.000m Sprint Scratch Race

- Fritz Siegenthaler — 16th place

Men's 4.000m Team Pursuit

- Hans Pfenninger, Heinrich Müller, Max Wirth, and Oskar von Büren

- Eliminated in quarterfinals (→ 8th place)

== Diving ==
Men

Athlete	Event	Preliminary		Final	
Athlete	Event	Points	Rank	Points	Rank
Heinz Schaub	3 m springboard	47.15	35	Did not advance	
Heinz Schaub	10 m platform	54.40	31	Did not advance	

Women

Athlete	Event	Preliminary		Final	
Athlete	Event	Points	Rank	Points	Rank
Ferdinanda Martini-Pautasso	10 m platform	30.04	15	Did not advance	

== Fencing ==
Ten fencers, nine men and one woman, represented Switzerland in 1952.

Men's épée

- Oswald Zappelli
- Paul Barth
- Paul Meister

Men's team épée

- Otto Rüfenacht, Paul Meister, Oswald Zappelli, Paul Barth, Willy Fitting, Mario Valota

Men's sabre

- Otto Greter
- Jules Amez-Droz
- Umberto Menegalli

Men's team sabre

- Umberto Menegalli, Oswald Zappelli, Otto Greter, Jules Amez-Droz

Women's foil

- Hedwig Rieder

== Modern pentathlon ==
Three male pentathletes represented Switzerland in 1952.

Individual

- Werner Vetterli
- Werner Schmid
- Erhard Minder

Team

- Werner Vetterli
- Werner Schmid
- Erhard Minder

== Rowing ==
Switzerland had 13 male rowers participate in five out of seven rowing events in 1952.

Men's single sculls

- Paul Meyer

Men's double sculls

- Peter Stebler
- Émile Knecht

Men's coxless pair

- Kurt Schmid
- Hans Kalt

Men's coxed pair

- Walter Lüchinger
- Alex Siebenhaar
- Walter Ludin (cox)

Men's coxed four

- Rico Bianchi
- Karl Weidmann
- Heini Scheller
- Émile Ess
- Walter Leiser (cox)

== Shooting ==
Nine shooters represented Switzerland in 1952.

25 m pistol

- Rudolf Schnyder

50 m pistol

- Beat Rhyner
- Alexander Specker

300 m rifle, three positions

- Robert Bürchler
- August Hollenstein

50 m rifle, three positions

- Ernst Huber
- Otto Horber

50 m rifle, prone

- Otto Horber
- Ernst Huber

Trap

- Louis Cavalli
- Pierre-André Flückiger

== Swimming ==
Men

Ranks given are within the heat.

Athlete	Event	Heat		Semifinal		Final	
Athlete	Event	Time	Rank	Time	Rank	Time	Rank
Michel Currat	100 m freestyle	1:07.2	7	Did not advance			
Walter Schneider	400 m freestyle	5:27.3	7	Did not advance			
Walter Schneider	1500 m freestyle	21:36.2	5	—N/a		Did not advance	
Hermann Gericke	100 m backstroke	1:12.6	5	Did not advance			
Alfons Oehy	200 m breaststroke	2:54.8	7	Did not advance			

Women

Ranks given are within the heat.

Athlete	Event	Heat		Semifinal		Final	
Athlete	Event	Time	Rank	Time	Rank	Time	Rank
Susy Vaterlaus	100 m freestyle	1:16.8	6	Did not advance			
Doris Gontersweiler-Vetterli	100 m backstroke	1:26.5	7	Did not advance			
Margrit Knabenhans	200 m breaststroke	3:17.4	7	Did not advance			
Liselotte Kobi	200 m breaststroke	3:22.0	7	Did not advance			
