= Mangiarotti =

Mangiarotti is a surname of Italian origin. Notable people with this surname include:

- Angelo Mangiarotti (born 1921), Italian architect and industrial designer
- Carola Mangiarotti (born 1952), Italian fencer, daughter of Edoardo
- Dario Mangiarotti (1915–2010), Italian fencer, son of Giuseppe
- Edoardo Mangiarotti (1919–2012), Italian fencer, son of Giuseppe
- Giuseppe Mangiarotti (1883–1970), Italian fencer
- Mario Mangiarotti (1920–2019), Italian fencer and sports manager, son of Giuseppe
