= Zeilinger =

Zeilinger is a German surname. Notable people with the surname include:

- Anton Zeilinger (born 1945), Austrian quantum physicist, Nobel Prize laureate
- Gabriele Zeilinger (1917–2011), Austrian fencer

== See also ==
- Zeilinger (company), an Austrian metalworking company
- 48681 Zeilinger, a main-belt asteroid
