= Rydz =

Rydz is a Polish surname, and a Polish name for Lactarius deliciosus mushroom. Notable people with the surname include:

- Edward Rydz-Śmigły (1886–1941), Polish general
- Małgorzata Rydz (born 1967), Polish athlete
- Wojciech Rydz (1932–2018), Polish fencer
- Callan Rydz (Born 1998), English darts player
