= Glyphuroplata uniformis =

Scientific classification
- Kingdom: Animalia
- Phylum: Arthropoda
- Class: Insecta
- Order: Coleoptera
- Suborder: Polyphaga
- Infraorder: Cucujiformia
- Family: Chrysomelidae
- Genus: Glyphuroplata
- Species: G. uniformis

Binomial name
- Glyphuroplata uniformis (Smith, 1885)

Synonyms
- Microrhopala uniformis Smith, 1885

Species of beetle

Glyphuroplata uniformis is a species of leaf beetle in the family Chrysomelidae. It is found in Central America and North America, where it has been recorded from Mexico (Jalisco) and the United States (Arizona, Arkansas, California, Louisiana, New Mexico, Oklahoma and Texas).

== Biology ==
They have been recorded feeding on Valota species. Furthermore, adults have been collected from Digitaria, Mimosa and Valota species and Celtis pallida.
