= Glyphuroplata nigella =

Scientific classification
- Kingdom: Animalia
- Phylum: Arthropoda
- Class: Insecta
- Order: Coleoptera
- Suborder: Polyphaga
- Infraorder: Cucujiformia
- Family: Chrysomelidae
- Genus: Glyphuroplata
- Species: G. nigella

Binomial name
- Glyphuroplata nigella (Weise, 1907)

Synonyms
- Uroplata nigella Weise, 1907

Species of beetle

Glyphuroplata nigella is a species of leaf beetle in the family Chrysomelidae. It is found in Central America and North America, where it has been recorded from Mexico, Costa Rica and the United States (Arizona, Colorado).

== Biology ==
They have been recorded feeding on Valota species. Furthermore, adults have been collected on Eriochloa gracilis and Mimosa species.
