= Zarnowiecki =

Zarnowiecki is a surname. Notable people with the surname include:

- Anita Zarnowiecki (born 1954), Swedish swimmer
- Bernt Zarnowiecki (born 1954), Swedish swimmer, twin brother of Anita
- Zbigniew Żarnowiecki (born 1927), Polish rower
