= Mario Mangiarotti =

Italian fencer (1920–2019)

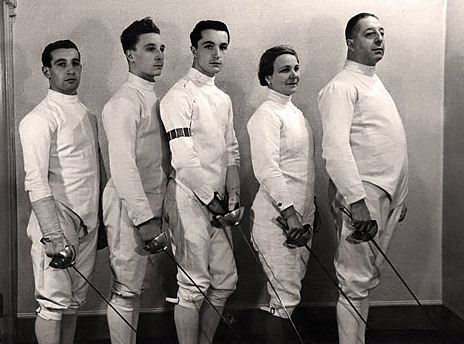

Mario Mangiarotti (Renate, 12 July 1920 – Bergamo, 10 June 2019) was an Italian fencer and sports manager, winner of a silver medal at the 1951 World Fencing Championships in Stockholm.

== Biography ==
Born in Renate, he was the son of the Olympian Giuseppe Mangiarotti and brother of the fencers Dario Mangiarotti and Edoardo Mangiarotti.

Having abandoned his competitive activity, he began his medical career as a cardiologist.

He was also president of the CONI of Bergamo, where he died on 10 June 2019, aged 98.
