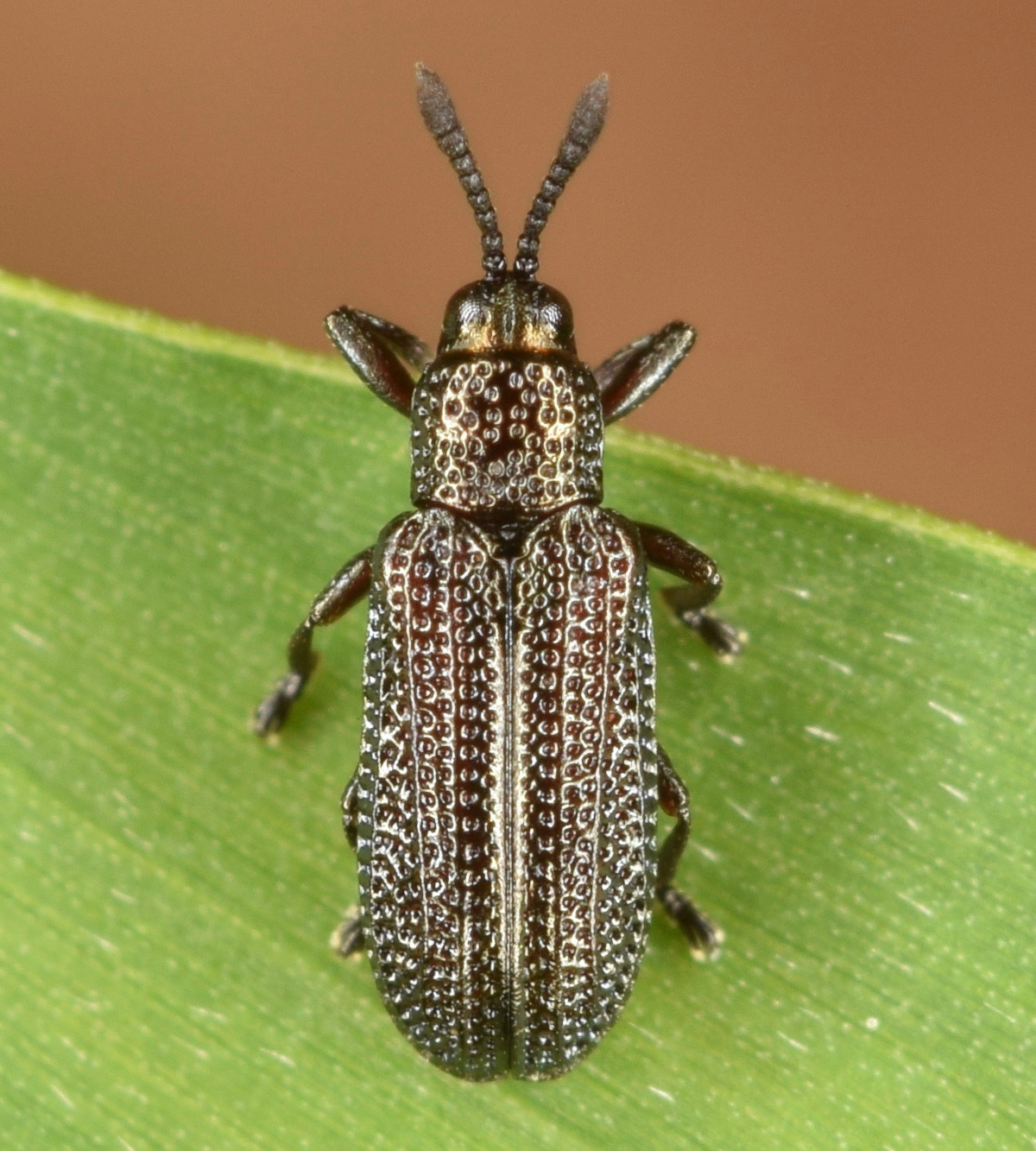

Scientific classification
- Kingdom: Animalia
- Phylum: Arthropoda
- Class: Insecta
- Order: Coleoptera
- Suborder: Polyphaga
- Infraorder: Cucujiformia
- Family: Chrysomelidae
- Genus: Glyphuroplata
- Species: G. pluto

Binomial name
- Glyphuroplata pluto (Newman, 1841)

Synonyms
- Microrhopala porcata Melsheimer, 1847; Glyphuroplata porcata (Melsheimer, 1846); Hispa pluto Newman, 1841

= Glyphuroplata pluto =

Species of beetle

Glyphuroplata pluto is a species of leaf beetle in the family Chrysomelidae. It is found in North America, where it has been recorded from Canada (Alberta, Manitoba, New Brunswick, Ontario, Quebec) and the United States (Alabama, Arkansas, Connecticut, District of Columbia, Florida, Georgia, Idaho, Illinois, Indiana, Iowa, Kansas, Kentucky, Maine, Maryland, Massachusetts, Michigan, Minnesota, Mississippi, Missouri, Nebraska, New Hampshire, New Jersey, New York, North Carolina, Ohio, Oklahoma, Pennsylvania, Rhode Island, South Carolina, South Dakota, Tennessee, Texas, Virginia, West Virginia, Wisconsin).

== Biology ==
They have been recorded feeding on Panicum capillare and Andropogon gerardi.
