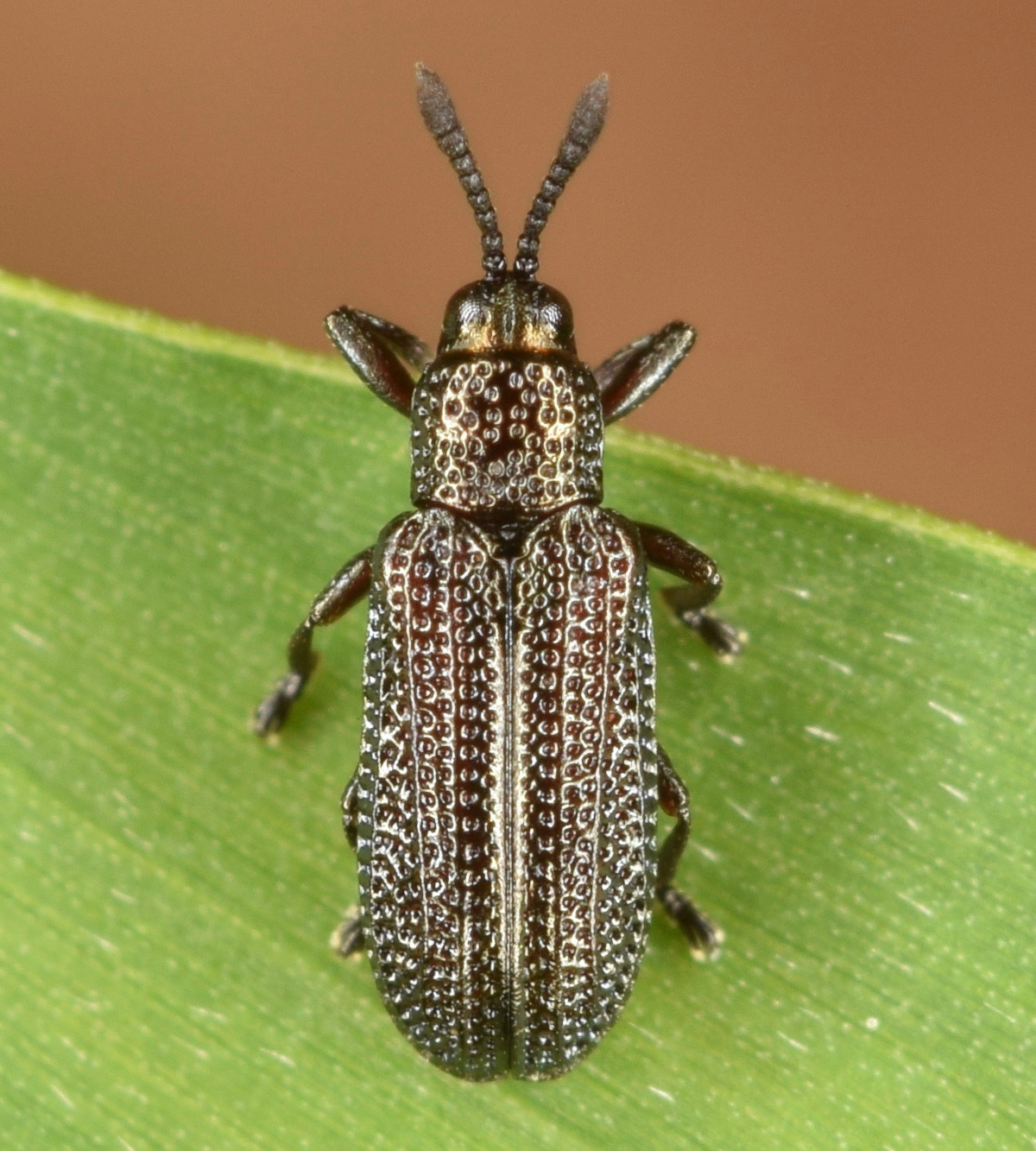
- Glyphuroplata pluto

Scientific classification
- Kingdom: Animalia
- Phylum: Arthropoda
- Clade: Pancrustacea
- Class: Insecta
- Order: Coleoptera
- Suborder: Polyphaga
- Infraorder: Cucujiformia
- Family: Chrysomelidae
- Tribe: Chalepini
- Genus: Glyphuroplata; Uhmann, 1937

= Glyphuroplata =

Genus of beetles

Glyphuroplata is a genus of tortoise beetles and hispines in the family Chrysomelidae. There are at least four described species in Glyphuroplata.

== Species ==
These four species belong to the genus Glyphuroplata:

- Glyphuroplata anisostenoides E. Riley, 1985
- Glyphuroplata nigella (Weise, 1907)
- Glyphuroplata pluto (Newman, 1841)
- Glyphuroplata uniformis (Smith, 1885)
