= Dario Mangiarotti =

Italian fencer (1915–2010)

- Mangiarotti in the 1950s

Personal information
- Born: 18 December 1915 Milan, Italy
- Died: 9 April 2010 (aged 94) Lavagna, Italy

Sport
- Sport: Fencing
Medal record
Men's fencing
Representing Italy
Men's fencing
Olympic Games
| Gold medal – first place | 1952 Helsinki | Team Épée |
| Silver medal – second place | 1948 London | Team Épée |
| Silver medal – second place | 1952 Helsinki | Individual Épée |
World Championships
| Gold medal – first place | 1937 Paris | Team Épée |
| Gold medal – first place | 1949 Cairo | Individual Épée |
| Gold medal – first place | 1949 Cairo | Team Épée |
| Gold medal – first place | 1950 Monte Carlo | Team Épée |
| Gold medal – first place | 1953 Brussels | Team Épée |
| Silver medal – second place | 1951 Stockholm | Team Épée |
| Bronze medal – third place | 1938 Piešťany | Team Épée |
| Bronze medal – third place | 1947 Lisbon | Team Épée |
| Bronze medal – third place | 1950 Monte Carlo | Individual Épée |
Mediterranean Games
| Gold medal – first place | 1951 Alexandria | Team épée |

Dario Mangiarotti (18 December 1915 – 9 April 2010) was an Italian fencer who competed at the 1948 and 1952 Summer Olympics and medaled in seven World Championships. He was born in Milan, the son of Giuseppe Mangiarotti, a fencer at the 1908 Summer Olympics in London. He was also the brother of Edoardo Mangiarotti, Italy's most successful Olympian and the winner of more Olympic and World titles than any fencer in history, and Mario Mangiarotti, who was also a fencer.

== Biography ==
He was taught the sport of fencing by his father and first became the individual Italian épée champion in 1936, a title that he would claim again in 1938, 1940, 1946, 1951, and 1953. He accumulated a total of seven medals in the team épée events at the FIE World Championships in Fencing: four gold (1937, 1949, 1950, 1953), one silver (1951), and two bronze (1938, 1947). He also won a gold medal in the individual épée event in 1949 and a bronze in the same competition in 1950. At the 1948 Summer Games in London, he won a silver medal in the team épée event after the Italian team finished as runners-up to France. He competed at the 1951 Mediterranean Games where he won a gold medal in the team épée event. At the 1952 Olympics in Helsinki the Italian team won the gold medal, and Mangiarotti won an additional silver medal in the individual épée competition, finishing behind his brother Edoardo. He won his final title at the 1966 World Masters Championships in Rome in the individual épée category.

In 1967 he took up the position of Head Maestro of the Italian fencing school Circolo della Spada, a position that he still held as of his 90th birthday in 2005. His niece Carola is also an Olympic fencer who competed in the 1976 and 1980 editions of the Games. Another brother, Mario, was also a fencer before he retired from the sport to become a cardiologist. He died on 9 April 2010 in Lavagna, at the age of 94.
