= Glyphuroplata anisostenoides =

Scientific classification
- Kingdom: Animalia
- Phylum: Arthropoda
- Class: Insecta
- Order: Coleoptera
- Suborder: Polyphaga
- Infraorder: Cucujiformia
- Family: Chrysomelidae
- Genus: Glyphuroplata
- Species: G. anisostenoides

Binomial name
- Glyphuroplata anisostenoides E. Riley, 1985

Species of beetle

Glyphuroplata anisostenoides is a species of leaf beetle in the family Chrysomelidae. It is found in North America, where it has been recorded from Louisiana, Missouri, Oklahoma and Texas.
