= Urszula Łukomska =

Polish gymnast

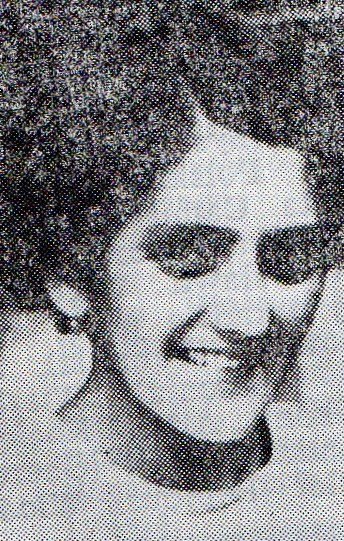

Personal information
- Nationality: Polish
- Born: 1 December 1926 Poznań, Poland
- Died: 28 November 1986 (aged 59)
- Agent: Poznań

Sport
- Country: Poland
- Sport: Gymnastics

Urszula Łukomska (1 December 1926 – 28 November 1986) was a Polish gymnast. She was born in Poznań. She competed at the 1952 Summer Olympics, in women's gymnastics.

She died on 28 November 1986 in Poznań.
