= Elena Libera =

Italian fencer (1917–2012)

Personal information
- Born: 28 September 1917 Milan, Italy
- Died: 8 March 2012 (aged 94) Paris, France

Sport
- Sport: Fencing

Elena Libera (28 September 1917 – 8 March 2012) was an Italian fencer. She competed in the women's individual foil event at the 1948 Summer Olympics.
