= Grete Kunz (fencer) =

Austrian fencer

Personal information
- Born: 7 April 1908

Sport
- Sport: Fencing

Grete Kunz (born 7 April 1908, date of death unknown) was an Austrian fencer. She competed in the women's individual foil event at the 1952 Summer Olympics.
