= Maria Arndt =

Polish sprinter (1929–2000)

Personal information
- Nationality: Polish
- Born: 20 October 1929 Łany, Poland
- Died: 6 April 2000 (aged 70) Warsaw, Poland
- Height: 1.70 m (5 ft 7 in)
- Weight: 62 kg (137 lb)

Sport
- Sport: Sprinting
- Events: 100 metres, 200 metres
- Club: Spójnia Warsaw (1951–1954)

Maria Arndt, married name Staworzyńska, later Blank (20 October 1929 – 6 April 2000) was a Polish sprinter. She competed in the women's 200 metres at the 1952 Summer Olympics.

== International competitions ==
Year	Competition	Venue	Position	Event	Notes
Representing Poland
1952	Olympic Games	Helsinki, Finland	33rd (h)	200 m	26.29
1952	Olympic Games	Helsinki, Finland	12th (h)	4 × 100 m relay	48.21

== Personal bests ==
- 100 metres – 12.3h (Wrocław 1952)
- 200 metres – 25.6h (Wałcz 1954)
- 80 metres hurdles – 11.8h (Warsaw 1954)
- Long jump – 5.25 (Warsaw 1954)
