= Éva Kun =

Hungarian fencer

Personal information
- Born: 7 November 1917
- Died: 2 April 1982 (aged 64) Canada

Sport
- Sport: Fencing

Éva Kun (7 November 1917 – 2 April 1982) was a Hungarian fencer. She competed in the women's individual foil event at the 1948 Summer Olympics.
