= Odette Drand =

French fencer (1927–2019)

Personal information
- Born: 11 March 1927 Laxou, France
- Died: 6 January 2019 (aged 91) Nancy, France

Sport
- Sport: Fencing

Odette Drand (11 March 1927, Laxou, France – 6 January 2019, Nancy, France) was a French fencer. She competed in the women's individual foil event at the 1952 Summer Olympics.
