= Appolinariya Plekhanova =

Soviet fencer

Personal information
- Born: 4 October 1919
- Died: 2005 (aged 85–86)

Sport
- Sport: Fencing

Appolinariya Plekhanova (Russian: Апполинария Плеханова; 4 October 1919 – 2005) was a Soviet fencer. She competed in the women's individual foil event at the 1952 Summer Olympics.
