= Roberto Battaglia =

Italian fencer (1909–1965)

Personal information
- Born: 23 June 1909 Milan, Italy
- Died: 26 August 1986 (aged 77) Milan, Italy

Sport
- Sport: Fencing
Medal record
Men's fencing
Representing Italy
Olympic Games
Gold medal – first place	1952 Helsinki	Épée, team

Roberto Battaglia (23 June 1909 – 26 August 1986) was an Italian fencer. He won a gold medal in the team épée event at the 1952 Summer Olympics.
