= Edward Schwarzer =

Polish rower

Edward Schwarzer (11 February 1929 – 23 October 2012) was a Polish rower who competed in the 1952 Summer Olympics.
