= Giuseppe Mangiarotti =

Italian fencer (1883–1970)

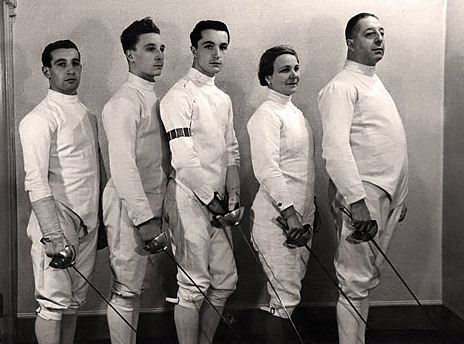
- Giuseppe Mangiarotti, first at right, with his wife and sons, Dario, Mario and Edoardo

Personal information
- Born: 27 May 1883 Broni, Italy
- Died: 24 October 1970 (aged 87) Bergamo, Italy

Sport
- Sport: Fencing

Giuseppe Mangiarotti (27 May 1883 – 24 October 1970) was an Italian fencer. He competed in the individual and team épée events at the 1908 Summer Olympics. His sons Dario, Mario and Edoardo were also fencers.
