= Gotfryd Gremlowski =

Polish swimmer

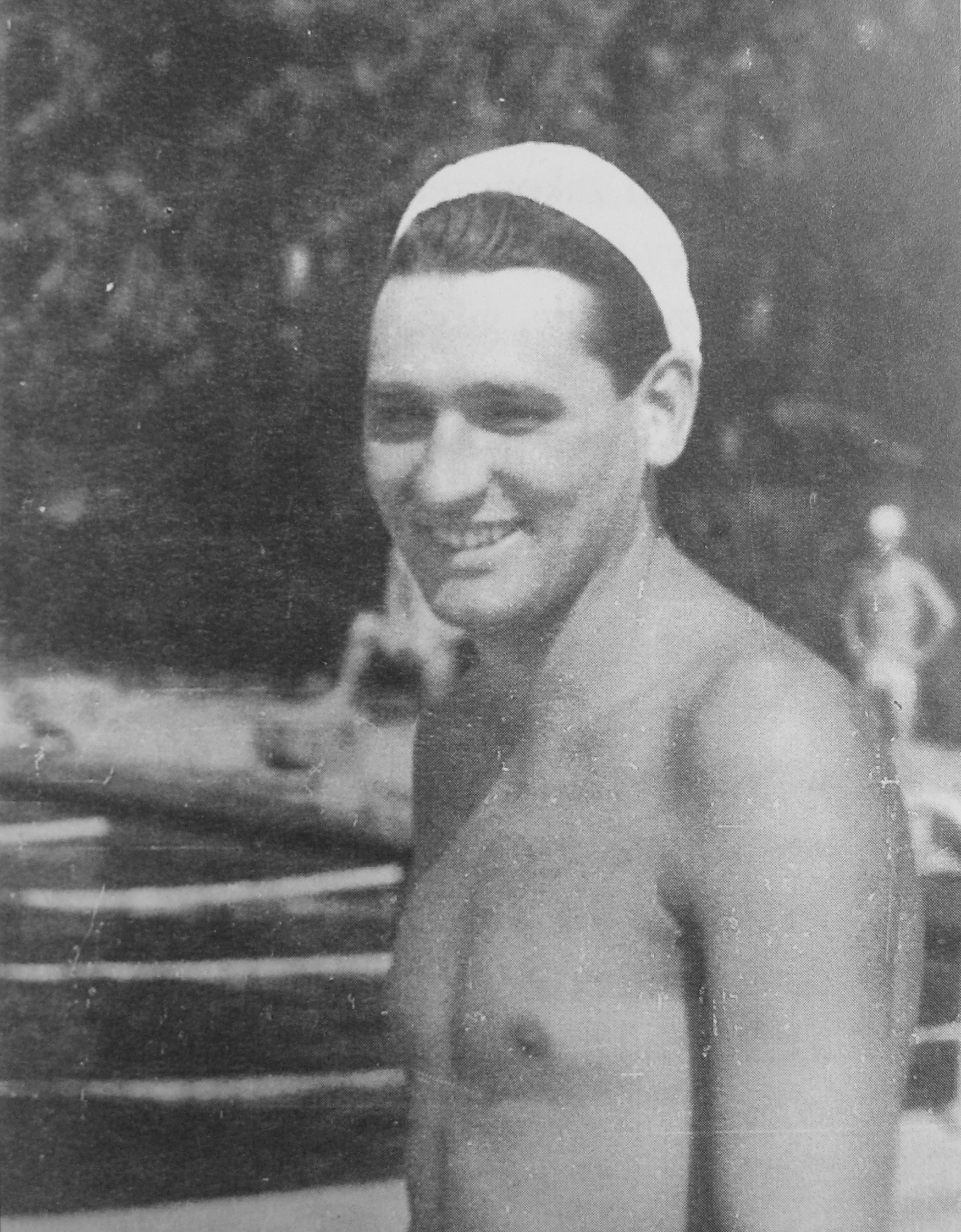

Personal information
- Nationality: Polish
- Born: 5 November 1931 Świętochłowice, Poland
- Died: 10 November 1987 (aged 56) Bergisch Gladbach, Germany

Sport
- Sport: Swimming

Gotfryd Gremlowski (5 November 1931 – 10 November 1987) was a Polish freestyle swimmer. He competed in three events at the 1952 Summer Olympics.
