= Tôn Thất Hải =

Vietnamese fencer

Personal information
- Born: 16 July 1935 (age 90)

Sport
- Sport: Fencing

Tôn Thất Hải (16 July 1935) is a Vietnamese fencer. He competed in the individual épée event at the 1952 Summer Olympics.
