= Zeilinger (company) =

Austrian metalworking company

- Native name: Karl Zeilinger Metallwarenerzeugungs- und Metallbau GesmbH
- Industry: Metalworking
- Headquarters: Turracherstrasse 21, A-9562 Himmelberg, Austria
- Website: www.zeilinger-metallbau.at

Metallbau Karl Zeilinger is one of the oldest metalworking companies in Austria, the family business founded in 1516 and located in Himmelberg, Carinthia.

Since 1874 the company is managed by the Zeilinger and Offner families and today it focuses on the metalware production and metal constructions.

== See also ==
- List of oldest companies
