= Anna Ponomaryova =

Soviet fencer

Personal information
- Born: 23 February 1920
- Died: 2009 (aged 88–89)

Sport
- Sport: Fencing

Anna Ponomaryova (Russian: Анна Пономарёва; 23 February 1920 – 2009) was a Soviet fencer. She competed in the women's individual foil event at the 1952 Summer Olympics.
