= Françoise Gouny =

French fencer

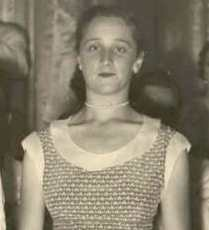
- Gouny in 1952

Personal information
- Born: Françoise Marie Renee Jacqueline Gouny; 12 April 1925 Paris, France
- Died: 24 August 2009 (aged 84) Forcalquier, France

Sport
- Sport: Fencing

Françoise Guittet née Françoise Marie Renee Jacqueline Gouny (12 April 1925 – 24 August 2009) was a French fencer. She competed in the women's individual foil event at the 1948 Summer Olympics.
