= Ireland at the 1952 Summer Olympics =

- IOC code: IRL
- NOC: Olympic Federation of Ireland
- Website: olympics.ie

in Helsinki
- Competitors: 19 in 6 sports
- Flag bearer: Paddy Carroll
- Medals Ranked 34th: Gold 0 Silver 1 Bronze 0 Total 1

Summer Olympics appearances (overview)
- 1924; 1928; 1932; 1936; 1948; 1952; 1956; 1960; 1964; 1968; 1972; 1976; 1980; 1984; 1988; 1992; 1996; 2000; 2004; 2008; 2012; 2016; 2020; 2024

Other related appearances
- Great Britain (1896–1920)

Ireland competed at the 1952 Summer Olympics in Helsinki, Finland. 19 competitors, all men, took part in 18 events in 6 sports. Ireland won its silver medal when John McNally reached the Bantamweight final

== Medalists ==
Medal	Name	Sport	Event
Silver	John McNally	Boxing	Men's Bantamweight

== Athletics ==
Athlete	Event	Heat		Quarterfinals		Semifinal		Final	
Athlete	Event	Time	Rank	Time	Rank	Time	Rank	Time	Rank
Paul Dolan	Men's 100m	11.12	3	Did Not Advance					
Paul Dolan	Men's 200m	22.04	2	22.15	3	Did Not Advance			
Paul Dolan	Men's 400m	48.81	3	Did Not Advance					
Joseph West	Men's Marathon	—						2:56:22.8	49

== Fencing ==
Five fencers, all men, represented Ireland in 1952.

Men's foil

- Harry Thuillier – Pool 3, 5th (2 Wins, 3 Losses)
- Patrick Duffy – Pool 5, 5th (2 Wins, 4 Losses)
- Kurt Wahl – Pool 4, 5th (2 Wins, 4 Losses)

Men's épée

- Tom Kearney – Pool 6, 4th (3 Wins, 4 Losses)
- Patrick Duffy – Pool 3, 7th (1 Win, 6 Losses)
- George Carpenter – Pool 2, 8th (1 Win, 6 Losses)
- Tom Kearney – Quarterfinal 5 9th (2 Win 6 Losses

== Sailing ==
- Alf Delaney – Finn 21st

== Wrestling ==
Jack Vard

- Round 1 Bout – vs (Australia) Dick Garrard Lost 3–0
- Round 2 Bout – vs (United States) Tommy Evans Lost Fall
