= Lylian Lecomte-Guyonneau =

French fencer

Personal information
- Full name: Liliane Germaine Lecomte-Guyonnea
- Born: 21 October 1921
- Died: 9 May 2004 (aged 82)

Sport
- Sport: Fencing

Liliane Germaine "Lylian" Lecomte-Guyonnea (21 October 1921 – 9 May 2004) was a French fencer. She competed in the women's individual foil event at the 1952 Summer Olympics.
