= Victoria Hagemann =

Swiss fencer

Vera Maria Hagemann
Personal information
- Born: 7 April 1927 Basel, Switzerland
- Died: 24 December 2012 (aged 85) Aarau, Switzerland

Sport
- Sport: Fencing

Vera Maria Hagemann (7 April 1923 – 24 December 2012) was a Swiss Olympic fencer. She competed in the women's individual foil event at the 1948 Summer Olympics.
