= Helena Dow =

American fencer (1917–1998)

Personal information
- Born: Helena Mroczkowska Dow; October 27, 1917 Paterson, New Jersey, U.S.
- Died: April 22, 1998 (aged 80) New York City, U.S.

Sport
- Sport: Fencing

Helena Mroczkowska Dow (October 27, 1917 – April 22, 1998) was an American fencer. She competed in the women's individual foil event at the 1948 Summer Olympics.
