= Lennart Magnusson =

Swedish fencer

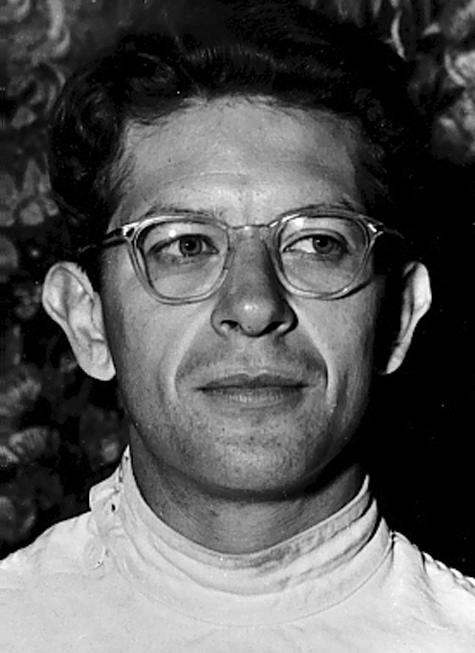

Personal information
- Born: 1 January 1924 Stockholm, Sweden
- Died: 2 September 2011 (aged 87)

Sport
- Sport: Fencing
- Club: FFF, Stockholm
Medal record
Representing Sweden
Olympic Games
Silver medal – second place	1952 Helsinki	Épée, team

Lennart Carl Oscar Magnusson (1 January 1924 – 2 September 2011) was a Swedish fencer. He won a silver medal in the team épée event at the 1952 Summer Olympics.
