= Carl Forssell =

Swedish fencer (1917–2005)

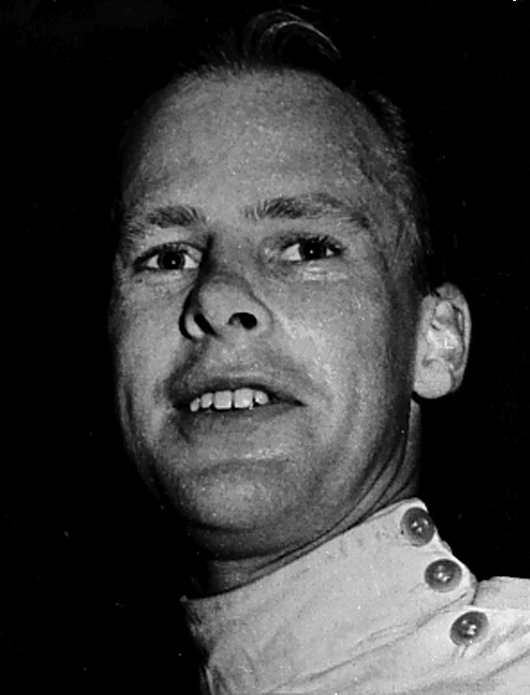
- Forssell, c. 1950

Personal information
- Born: 25 October 1917 Stockholm, Sweden
- Died: 28 November 2005 (aged 88) Ängelholm, Sweden

Sport
- Sport: Fencing
- Events: épée, foil
- Club: Stockholms AF
Medal record
Representing Sweden
Olympic Games
Bronze medal – third place	1948 London	Épée, team
Silver medal – second place	1952 Helsinki	Épée, team
World Championships
Silver medal – second place	1938 Piešťany	Épée, team
Silver medal – second place	1947 Lisbon	Épée, team
Silver medal – second place	1949 Cairo	Épée, team
Silver medal – second place	1950 Monte Carlo	Épée, ind.
Bronze medal – third place	1950 Monte Carlo	Épée, team
Bronze medal – third place	1951 Stockholm	Épée, team
Silver medal – second place	1954 Luxemburg	Épée, team

Carl Forssell (25 October 1917 – 28 November 2005) was a Swedish fencer. Competing in the team épée he won a bronze medal at the 1948 Summer Olympics, a silver at the 1952 Summer Olympics, as well as four silver and two bronze medals at the world championships of 1938–1951. Individually he won a silver at the 1950 World Championships and finished eighth at the 1952 Olympics. He was a medical doctor by profession.
