= Jerzy Boniecki =

Polish swimmer (1933–2021)

Personal information
- Born: 7 February 1933 Łódź, Poland
- Died: 5 March 2021 (aged 88) Poland

Sport
- Sport: Swimming

Jerzy Boniecki (7 February 1933 – 5 March 2021) was a Polish freestyle and backstroke swimmer. He competed in two events at the 1952 Summer Olympics.
