= Jerzy Jokiel =

Polish gymnast (1931–2020)

- Full name: Jerzy Paweł Jokiel
- Born: 9 August 1931 Ruda Śląska, Second Polish Republic
- Died: 7 October 2020 (aged 89) Bochum, Germany

Gymnastics career
- Discipline: Men's artistic gymnastics
- Country represented: Poland
- Gym: Klub Sportowy Pogoń Ruda Śląska
Medal record
Men's artistic gymnastics
Representing Poland
Olympic Games
Silver medal – second place	1952 Helsinki	Floor

Jerzy Paweł Jokiel (9 August 1931 – 7 October 2020) was a Polish gymnast. He won a silver olympic medal in 1952.
