= Gytte Minton =

British fencer

Personal information
- Born: 29 April 1901 Copenhagen, Denmark
- Died: 11 July 1964 (aged 63) Harrow, London, England

Sport
- Sport: Fencing

Gytte Minton (29 April 1901 – 11 July 1964) was a British fencer. She competed in the women's individual foil event at the 1948 Summer Olympics.
