= Anna Klüpfel =

Swiss fencer (born 1903)

Personal information
- Born: 4 August 1903 Chelsea, London, England

Sport
- Sport: Fencing

Anna Klüpfel (born 4 August 1903, date of death unknown) was a Swiss fencer. She competed in the women's individual foil event at the 1948 Summer Olympics. She was born in London in the United Kingdom.
