= Maria Cerra =

American fencer (1918–2015)

Personal information
- Born: Maria del Pilar Cerra; May 17, 1918 New York City, U.S.
- Died: January 24, 2015 (aged 96) Paramus, New Jersey, U.S.

Sport
- Sport: Fencing

Maria del Pilar Cerra (May 17, 1918 – January 24, 2015) was an American fencer. She competed in the women's individual foil event at the 1948 Summer Olympics.

== See also ==
- List of USFA Hall of Fame members
