= Edoardo Mangiarotti =

Italian fencer (1919–2012)

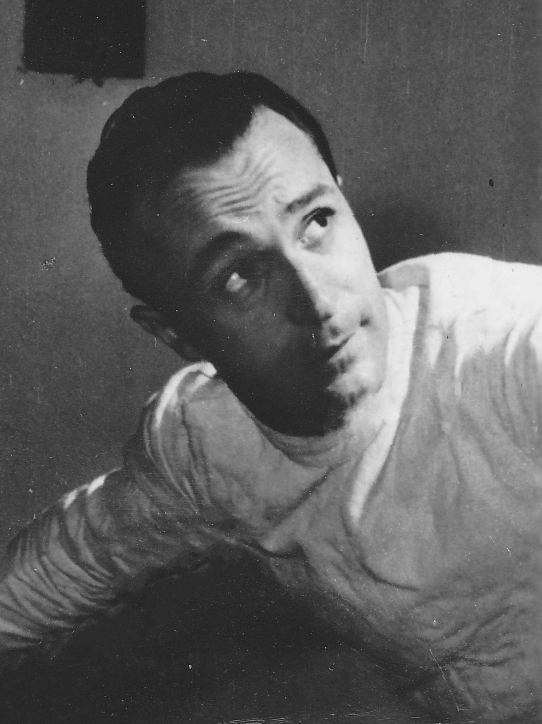

Personal information
- Born: 7 April 1919 Renate, Italy
- Died: 25 May 2012 (aged 93) Milan, Italy

Fencing career
- Sport: Fencing
- Weapon: épée, foil
- Hand: left-handed
- Retired: 1961
Medal record
Men's fencing
Representing Italy
Olympic Games
Gold medal – first place	1936 Berlin	Team épée
Gold medal – first place	1952 Helsinki	Individual épée
Gold medal – first place	1952 Helsinki	Team épée
Gold medal – first place	1956 Melbourne	Team foil
Gold medal – first place	1956 Melbourne	Team épée
Gold medal – first place	1960 Rome	Team épée
Silver medal – second place	1948 London	Team foil
Silver medal – second place	1948 London	Team épée
Silver medal – second place	1952 Helsinki	Individual foil
Silver medal – second place	1952 Helsinki	Team foil
Silver medal – second place	1960 Rome	Team foil
Bronze medal – third place	1948 London	Individual épée
Bronze medal – third place	1956 Melbourne	Individual épée
World Championships
Gold medal – first place	1937 Paris	Team épée
Gold medal – first place	1949 Cairo	Team épée
Gold medal – first place	1949 Cairo	Team foil
Gold medal – first place	1950 Monte Carlo	Team épée
Gold medal – first place	1950 Monte Carlo	Team foil
Gold medal – first place	1951 Stockholm	Individual épée
Gold medal – first place	1951 Stockholm	Team foil
Gold medal – first place	1953 Brussels	Team épée
Gold medal – first place	1954 Luxembourg	Individual épée
Gold medal – first place	1954 Luxembourg	Team épée
Gold medal – first place	1954 Luxembourg	Team foil
Gold medal – first place	1955 Rome	Team épée
Gold medal – first place	1955 Rome	Team foil
Silver medal – second place	1938 Piešťany	Individual épée
Silver medal – second place	1951 Stockholm	Team épée
Silver medal – second place	1951 Stockholm	Individual foil
Silver medal – second place	1951 Stockholm	Team foil
Silver medal – second place	1953 Brussels	Individual foil
Silver medal – second place	1953 Brussels	Team foil
Silver medal – second place	1954 Luxembourg	Individual foil
Silver medal – second place	1958 Philadelphia	Individual épée
Bronze medal – third place	1938 Piešťany	Team épée
Bronze medal – third place	1947 Lisbon	Individual foil
Bronze medal – third place	1947 Lisbon	Team épée
Bronze medal – third place	1949 Cairo	Individual foil
Bronze medal – third place	1958 Philadelphia	Team foil
Mediterranean Games
Gold medal – first place	1951 Alexandria	Team épée
Gold medal – first place	1951 Alexandria	Team foil
Silver medal – second place	1955 Barcelona	Team épée
Silver medal – second place	1955 Barcelona	Individual foil
Silver medal – second place	1955 Barcelona	Team foil
Bronze medal – third place	1951 Alexandria	Individual foil

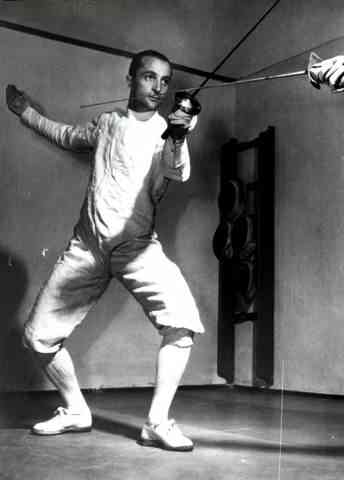
Edoardo Mangiarotti

Edoardo Mangiarotti (Italian pronunciation: [edoˈardo mandʒaˈrɔtti]; 7 April 1919 – 25 May 2012) was an Italian fencer. He won a total of 39 Olympic and World championship medals, more than any other fencer in the history of the sport. His Olympic medals include one individual gold, five team golds, five silver, and two bronze medals from 1936 to 1960, making him the second-most decorated Italian Olympian of all time and the twelfth-most decorated Olympian of all time.

== Fencing background ==
Fencing is one of the original sports from the 1896 Games. Electronic scoring equipment was introduced in 1936 in the épée events when Mangiarotti won a gold medal with the other members of the Italian team. He consistently won each épée event and was second only to expert Christian d'Oriola in the foil events. On a points for and against basis in international competition, Mangiarotti was the most successful fencer in history.

== Early life ==
Edoardo Mangiarotti was born into a famous fencing family on 7 April 1919. Giuseppe Mangiarotti, a Milanese fencing master and 17 times national épée champion, planned his son's championship career and molded him into an awkward opponent by converting a natural right-hander to a left-hander. Dario Mangiarotti, older brother of the Edoardo, won the world title in Cairo in 1949 and a gold and two silver in the Olympics. His brother Mario Mangiarotti was also a fencer.

== Pre-World War II career ==
Edoardo was a national junior foil champion at the age of 11. He won a place in the Italian senior team at age 16 and competed in the 1935 world championships. The following year young Mangiarotti rewarded his father for his conscientious coaching with an Olympic team épée gold medal in the Olympics.

In Paris, 1937, Edoardo Mangiarotti won a gold medal in a World Championships team event. The next year in Czechoslovakia he finished second in the individual épée, won a bronze in the team épée and a gold in team foil.

== Career 1945-55 ==
Even at such an early stage in his career, the young Mangiarotti showed the strong determination and personality that was to separate him from other international competitors in both foil and épée in the 1950s. At the 1948 London Olympics, Mangiarotti finished with a bronze medal in the individual épée and two team silver medals. Dario Mangiarotti could not compete because of an injury.

In 1949, Dario won the individual épée World Championship in Cairo while his younger brother participated in the winning épée and foil teams. Two years later Edoardo forged to the top in individual épée by winning the world championships in Stockholm.

He competed at the Mediterranean Games in 1951, where he won gold medals in the team épée and foil events and a bronze medal in the individual foil event, and in the 1955 where he won silver medals in the team épée and foil events and individual foil event.

== 1952 Helsinki ==
The Helsinki Games in 1952 were the crowning glory for the Mangiarotti brothers. Against a record field of 76 competitors Edoardo Mangiarotti won the Olympic épée individual gold medal with decisive style. After a somewhat shaky start in the final he ran out the winner with seven victories. His brother had won the silver from Switzerland's Oswald Zappelli, who had beaten Edoardo for the silver medal in the previous Olympics.

The record created at the Helsinki Olympics by the Mangiarotti brothers may be second only to their countrymen the Nadi brothers. While Edoardo secured two gold medals for the épée team and individual titles and two silver medals for the foil team and individual, his brother won a gold medal for the épée team event and a silver for the individual to give the family a remarkable six medals. This compares with the 9 medals, 8 gold and 1 silver, won by Nedo Nadi (5 gold) and his brother Aldo Nadi (3 gold, 1 silver) in the 1920 Olympics, all in fencing. (reference www.olympic.org)

== 1956 Melbourne ==
By the Melbourne Olympics, Edoardo was a fraction past his best but he refused to leave the international arena without a fight. In the individual épée, Australian spectators were treated to a dramatic finale. Three Italians finished equal first, each with five wins and two losses. A barrage had to be held to sort out the medal winners. The drama heightened after the first section of the play off when Mangiarotti, Carlo Pavesi and Giuseppe Delfino all had one win and one loss. The second barrage broke the deadlock; Mangiarotti tired towards midnight and lost both his bouts, then Pavesi beat Delfino to clinch the gold medal. The Italians had a clean sweep of the medals with Mangiarotti taking the bronze. As compensation he won gold in both épée and foil team events.

== 1960 Rome ==
At the 1960 Games in Rome, Mangiarotti now a 41-year-old, and the oldest on the Italian team, won a silver medal in the team foil behind the Soviet squad that boasted individual champion Zhdanovich. The Italian épée squad which included Mangiarotti and individual gold medalist Delfino won the team event from a brilliant British squad led by Bill Hoskyns the 1958 World individual champion. This was Mangiarotti's 13th and last Olympic medal, breaking the previous record of 12 by Paavo Nurmi at the 1928 Summer Olympics in Amsterdam. His record would stand until the 1964 Summer Olympics in Tokyo, when Larisa Latynina would win her 18th medal, a record which stood until broken by Michael Phelps on 31 July 2012 at the 2012 Summer Olympics in London.

== Post-Olympic retirement ==
Mangiarotti retired in 1961 and left the Olympic fencing arena as the greatest combined épée and foil fencer the world had ever seen. His participation in world and Olympic championships spanned 25 years and resulted in an amazing 39 top three placings. This five time Olympian was awarded a Bronze Olympic order in 1977.

== International Olympic Committee award ==
In 2003, the International Olympic Committee awarded Edoardo Mangiarotti with a Platinum Wreath, with a document that stated that: "Edoardo Mangiarotti's total of 39 gold, silver & bronze medals in Olympic & World Fencing Championships, which earns him the distinction of being the greatest Fencer in that sport's history."

== See also ==
- List of multiple Olympic gold medalists
- List of multiple Olympic gold medalists in one event
- List of multiple Summer Olympic medalists
- Multiple medallist at the World Fencing Championships
- Italy at the Olympics – Men gold medalist
- Italy national fencing team – Multiple medalists
- Legends of Italian sport - Walk of Fame

Records
Preceded by (Finland) Paavo Nurmi	Most career Olympic medals 1960 – 1964	Succeeded by (Soviet Union) Larisa Latynina
Preceded by (Finland) Paavo Nurmi	Most career Olympic medals by a man 1960 – 1964	Succeeded by (Soviet Union) Boris Shakhlin
Summer Olympics
Preceded by Miranda Cicognani	Flag bearer for Italy; 1956 Melbourne	Succeeded by Edoardo Mangiarotti
Preceded by Edoardo Mangiarotti	Flag bearer for Italy; 1960 Rome	Succeeded by Giuseppe Delfino
