= Nadezhda Shitikova =

Soviet fencer

Personal information
- Born: 15 September 1923
- Died: 1995 (aged 71–72)

Sport
- Sport: Fencing

Nadezhda Shitikova (Russian: Надежда Денисовна Шитикова; 15 September 1923 – 1995) was a Soviet fencer. She competed in the women's individual foil event at the 1952 and 1956 Summer Olympics.
