= Mário Mourão =

Portuguese fencer

Personal information
- Born: Mário Luís Fernandes de Sampaio Mourão; 22 September 1924
- Died: 1994 (aged 69–70)

Sport
- Sport: Fencing

Mário Luís Fernandes de Sampaio Mourão (22 September 1924 – 1994) was a Portuguese fencer. He competed in the individual and team épée events at the 1952 Summer Olympics.
