= 1947 World Fencing Championships =

International fencing competition

1947 World Championships in Fencing
- Host city: Lisbon, Portugal

The 1947 World Fencing Championships were held in Lisbon, Portugal.

== Medal table ==
Rank	Nation	Gold	Silver	Bronze	Total
1	France (FRA)	4	1	1	6
2	Italy (ITA)	2	3	4	9
3	Austria (AUT)	1	0	0	1
3	Denmark (DEN)	1	0	0	1
5	Belgium (BEL)	0	2	2	4
6	Sweden (SWE)	0	2	0	2
7	Egypt (EGY)	0	0	1	1
Totals (7 entries)		8	8	8	24

== Medal summary ==
=== Men's events ===
Event	Gold	Silver	Bronze
Individual Foil	(France) Christian d'Oriola	(Italy) Manlio Di Rosa	(Italy) Edoardo Mangiarotti
Team Foil	France	Italy	Belgium
Individual Sabre	(Italy) Aldo Montano	(Belgium) Georges de Bourguignon	(Italy) Gastone Darè
Team Sabre	Italy	Belgium	(Kingdom of Egypt) Egypt
Individual Épée	(France) Édouard Artigas	(Sweden) Bengt Ljungquist	(Belgium) Raoul Henkart
Team Épée	France	Sweden	Italy

=== Women's events ===
Event	Gold	Silver	Bronze
Individual Foil	(Austria) Ellen Müller-Preis	(Italy) Silvia Strukel	(France) Louisette Malherbaud
Team Foil	Denmark	France	Italy
