= Oswald Zappelli =

Swiss fencer

Personal information
- Born: 27 October 1913 Lausanne, Switzerland
- Died: 3 April 1968 (aged 54) Lausanne, Switzerland

Sport
- Sport: Fencing
Medal record
Men's fencing
Representing Switzerland
Olympic Games
Silver medal – second place	1948 London	Épée, individual
Bronze medal – third place	1952 Helsinki	Épée, individual
Bronze medal – third place	1952 Helsinki	Épée, team

Oswald Zappelli (27 October 1913 – 3 April 1968) was a Swiss fencer. He won a silver medal in the individual épée event at the 1948 Summer Olympics and bronze medals in the individual and team épée events at the 1952 Summer Olympics.
