= Patricia Buller =

British fencer

Personal information
- Born: 13 June 1929 Horsham, West Sussex, England
- Died: 18 April 2013 (aged 83)

Sport
- Sport: Fencing

Patricia Buller (13 July 1929 – 18 April 2013) was a British fencer. She competed in the women's individual foil event at the 1952 Summer Olympics.
