= Alfred Skrobisch =

American fencer

Personal information
- Born: November 19, 1913 London, England
- Died: November 5, 1991 (aged 77) Boones Mill, Virginia, United States

Sport
- Sport: Fencing

Alfred Skrobisch (November 19, 1913 – November 5, 1991) was an American fencer. He fenced for the Columbia Lions fencing team. He competed in the individual and team épée events at the 1952 Summer Olympics.
