= Abelardo Menéndez =

Cuban fencer (1928–1995)

Personal information
- Full name: Abelardo Menéndez Orue
- Born: 5 September 1928 Havana, Cuba
- Died: 22 May 1995 (aged 66) Miami, Florida, United States

Sport
- Sport: Fencing
Medal record
Men's fencing
Representing Cuba
Pan American Games
| Bronze medal – third place | 1951 Buenos Aires | Team foil |

Abelardo Menéndez Orue (Note: In this Spanish name, the first or paternal surname is Menéndez and the second or maternal family name is Orue.) (5 September 1928 – 22 May 1995) was a Cuban fencer. He competed at the 1952 and 1960 Summer Olympics.
