= Gabriele Zeilinger =

Austrian fencer

Personal information
- Born: 15 November 1917
- Died: 6 July 2011 (aged 93)

Sport
- Sport: Fencing

Gabriele Zeilinger (15 November 1917 – 6 July 2011) was an Austrian fencer. She competed in the women's individual foil event at the 1948 Summer Olympics.
