= 1951 World Fencing Championships =

International fencing competition

1951 World Championships in Fencing
- Host city: Stockholm, Sweden

The 1951 World Fencing Championships were held in Stockholm, Sweden.

== Medal table ==
* Host nation (Sweden)

Rank	Nation	Gold	Silver	Bronze	Total
1	Hungary (HUN)	3	2	1	6
2	France (FRA)	3	0	1	4
3	Italy (ITA)	2	5	1	8
4	Denmark (DEN)	0	1	1	2
5	Sweden (SWE)*	0	0	2	2
6	Belgium (BEL)	0	0	1	1
6	Egypt (EGY)	0	0	1	1
Totals (7 entries)		8	8	8	24

== Medal summary ==
=== Men's events ===
Event	Gold	Silver	Bronze
Individual Foil	(Italy) Manlio Di Rosa	(Italy) Edoardo Mangiarotti	(France) Jehan Buhan
Team Foil	France	Italy	(Kingdom of Egypt) Egypt
Individual Sabre	(Hungary) Aladár Gerevich	(Hungary) Pál Kovács	(Italy) Gastone Darè
Team Sabre	Hungary	Italy	Belgium
Individual Épée	(Italy) Edoardo Mangiarotti	(Italy) Carlo Pavesi	(Sweden) Sven Fahlman
Team Épée	France	Italy	Sweden

=== Women's events ===
Event	Gold	Silver	Bronze
Individual Foil	(Hungary) Ilona Elek	(Denmark) Karen Lachmann	(Hungary) Magdolna Nyári-Kovács
Team Foil	France	Hungary	Denmark
