= Velleda Cesari =

Italian fencer (1920–2003)

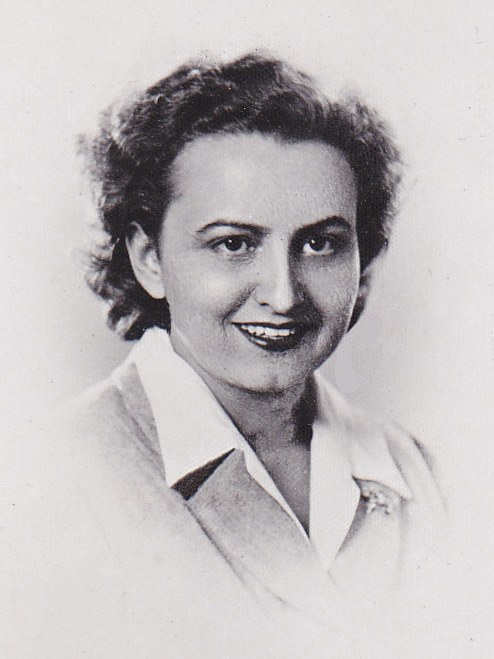

Personal information
- Born: 15 February 1920 Bologna, Italy
- Died: 3 May 2003 (aged 83) Genoa, Italy

Sport
- Sport: Fencing
Medal record
Representing Italy
Olympic Games
| Bronze medal – third place | 1960 Rome | Foil, team |
World Championships
| Bronze medal – third place | 1947 Lisbon | Foil, team |
| Bronze medal – third place | 1952 Copenhagen | Foil, team |
| Bronze medal – third place | 1953 Brussels | Foil, team |
| Silver medal – second place | 1954 Luxemburg | Foil, team |
| Bronze medal – third place | 1955 Rome | Foil, team |
| Gold medal – first place | 1957 Paris | Foil, team |

Velleda Cesari (15 February 1920 – 3 May 2003) was an Italian fencer. She competed in the individual foil event at the 1948, 1952 and 1956 Olympics with the best achievement of seventh place in 1948. In 1960 she won a bronze medal in the team foil event.
