= Zygmunt Grodner =

Polish fencer and physician (1932–2020)

Personal information
- Born: 12 January 1932 Warsaw, Poland
- Died: 21 February 2020 (aged 88)

Sport
- Sport: Fencing

Zygmunt Grodner (12 January 1932 – 21 February 2020) was a Polish fencer and physician. He competed in the team épée event at the 1952 Summer Olympics.
