= Otto Rüfenacht =

Swiss fencer

Personal information
- Born: 27 October 1919
- Died: 1 November 1982 (aged 63)

Sport
- Sport: Fencing
Medal record
Men's fencing
Representing Switzerland
Olympic Games
Bronze medal – third place	1952 Helsinki	Épée, team

Otto Rüfenacht (27 October 1919 – 1 November 1982) was a Swiss fencer. He won a bronze medal in the team épée event at the 1952 Summer Olympics.
