= Willy Fitting =

Swiss fencer

Personal information
- Born: 25 January 1925
- Died: 26 April 2017 (aged 92)

Sport
- Sport: Fencing
Medal record
Men's fencing
Representing Switzerland
Olympic Games
Bronze medal – third place	1952 Helsinki	Épée, team

Willy Fitting (25 January 1925 – 26 April 2017) was a Swiss épée and sabre fencer. He won a bronze medal in the team épée event at the 1952 Summer Olympics.
