= Friedrieke Wenisch-Filz =

Austrian fencer

Personal information
- Born: 27 August 1907
- Died: 22 July 1981 (aged 73)

Sport
- Sport: Fencing

Friedrieke Wenisch-Filz (27 August 1907 – 22 July 1981) was an Austrian fencer. She competed in the women's individual foil event at the 1936, 1948 and 1952 Summer Olympics.
