= Tom Kearney (fencer) =

Irish fencer

Personal information
- Born: 4 June 1923; Kilkenny, Irish Free State
- Died: 16 January 1992 (aged 68); Kilkenny, Ireland

Sport
- Sport: Fencing

Thomas Kearney (4 June 1923 – 16 January 1992) was an Irish épée and sabre fencer. He competed at the 1952 and 1960 Summer Olympics.
