= Rubén Soberón =

Guatemalan fencer (1909–1990)

José Rubén Soberón Riveiro
Personal information
- Born: 26 June 1909 Guatemala City, Guatemala
- Died: 7 September 1999 (aged 90) Guatemala City, Guatemala

Sport
- Sport: Fencing

Rubén Soberón (26 June 1909 – 7 September 1999) was a Guatemalan fencer. He competed in the individual foil and épée events at the 1952 Summer Olympics.
