= Walter de Paula =

Brazilian fencer

Personal information
- Born: 5 March 1916
- Died: 31 May 1998 (aged 82)

Sport
- Sport: Fencing

Walter de Paula (5 March 1916 – 31 May 1998) was a Brazilian épée fencer. He competed at the 1948 and 1952 Summer Olympics.
