= Zbigniew Żarnowiecki =

Polish rower (born 1927)

Zbigniew Żarnowiecki (born 15 April 1927) is a Polish former rower who competed in the 1952 Summer Olympics.
