= Lev Saychuk =

Russian fencer (1923–2005)

Personal information
- Born: 12 April 1923 Moscow, Russian SFSR, Soviet Union
- Died: 24 January 2005 (aged 81) Moscow, Russia

Sport
- Sport: Fencing

Lev Vasilyevich Saychuk (Russian: Лев Васильевич Сайчук; 12 April 1923 – 24 January 2005) was a Soviet fencer. He competed in the individual and team épée events at the 1952 Summer Olympics and the team event at the 1956 Summer Olympics.
