= Umberto Menegalli =

Swiss fencer

Personal information
- Born: 25 July 1925
- Died: 29 July 1988 (aged 63)

Sport
- Sport: Fencing

Umberto Menegalli (25 July 1925 – 29 July 1988) was a Swiss fencer. He competed in the individual and team sabre events at the 1952 Summer Olympics.
