= Sven Fahlman =

Swedish fencer (1914–2003)

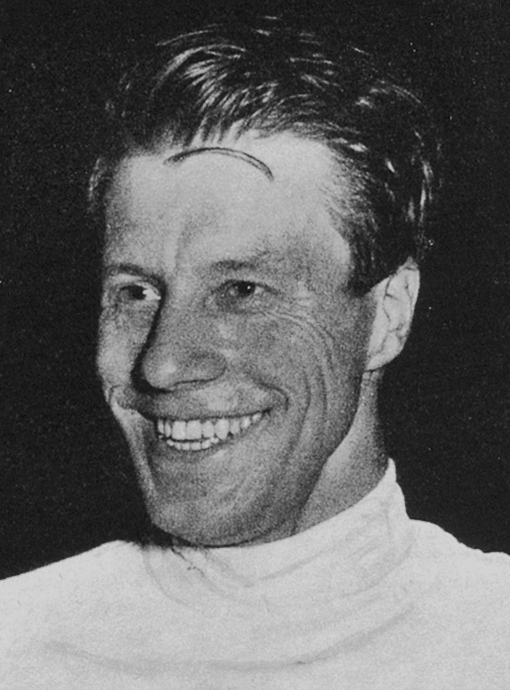

Personal information
- Born: 11 July 1914 Stockholm, Sweden
- Died: 23 June 2003 (aged 88) Stockholm, Sweden

Sport
- Sport: Fencing
- Event: Épée
- Club: Flottans IF, Stockholm
Medal record
Representing Sweden
Olympic Games
Silver medal – second place	1952 Helsinki	Épée, team
World Championships
Silver medal – second place	1947 Lisbon	Épée, team
Bronze medal – third place	1950 Monte Carlo	Épée, team
Bronze medal – third place	1951 Stockholm	Épée, team
Bronze medal – third place	1951 Stockholm	Épée, ind.
Silver medal – second place	1954 Luxembourg	Épée, team

Sven Torsten Fahlman (11 July 1914 – 23 June 2003) was a Swedish fencer who won a silver medal in the team épée event at the 1952 Summer Olympics. He also won two silver and three bronze medals in épée at the world championships of 1947–54.
