= Polly Craus =

American fencer

Polly Craus August
Personal information
- Born: February 17, 1923 McKinney, Texas, United States
- Died: October 7, 2006 (aged 83) Burbank, California, United States

Sport
- Sport: Fencing

Mary Ellen "Polly" Craus August (February 17, 1923 – October 7, 2006) was an American fencer who also worked in the movie industry in Hollywood. In 1949, she was the US Women's Individual Foil Champion. She competed in the women's individual foil event at the 1952 Summer Olympics.

The Craus family moved to Los Angeles in the 1930s. She started studying fencing with Ralph Faulkner in 1939. She credited fencing with helping her deal with her dyslexia.

She was also very interested in working in the movie industry. In 1940 and 1941, she studied drama at Los Angeles City College, but left school and worked for Metro-Goldwyn-Mayer and Warner Bros. as a script supervisor and production assistant; one of the films she worked on was A Streetcar Named Desire.
