= Lilo Allgayer =

German fencer

Personal information
- Born: 6 October 1915 Offenbach am Main, German Empire
- Died: 23 December 2009 (aged 94) Bad Orb, Hesse, Germany

Sport
- Sport: Fencing

Lieselotte Anni "Lilo" Allgayer Deutzer König (6 October 1915 – 23 December 2009) was a German fencer. She competed in the women's individual foil event at the 1952 Summer Olympics.
