= Zoltan Uray =

Romanian fencer

Zoltán Uray
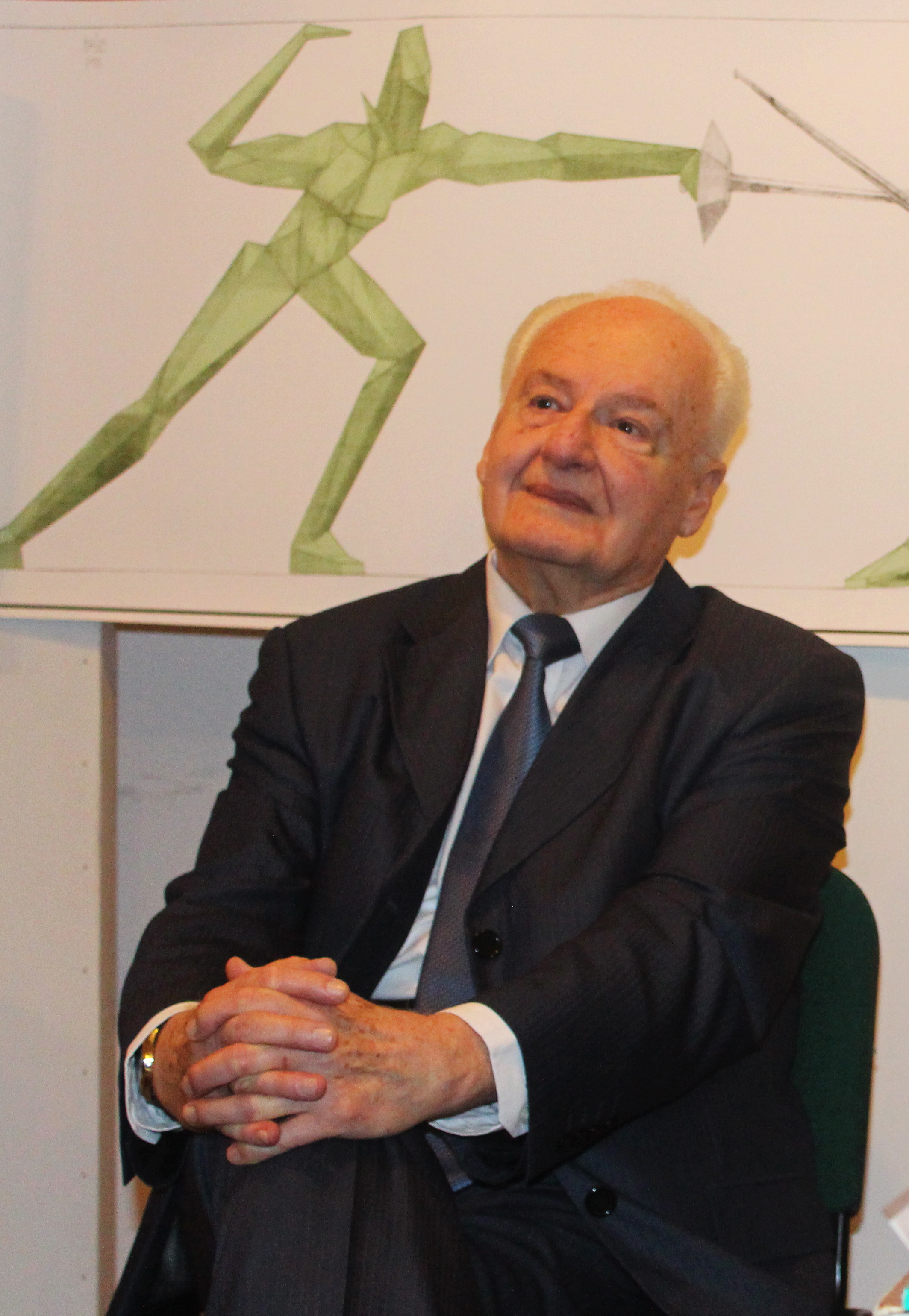
- photo: László Horváth

Personal information
- Born: 23 September 1931 (age 94) Cluj, Romania

Sport
- Sport: Fencing

Zoltán Uray (born 23 September 1931) is a Romanian fencer and a Transylvanian Hungarian biologist, radiologist, doctor of biological sciences, external member of the Hungarian Academy of Sciences. As a fencer he competed in the individual épée event at the 1952 Summer Olympics.
