= Louisette Malherbaud =

French fencer

Personal information
- Full name: Louis Frederique Paulette Malherbaud
- Born: 28 April 1917
- Died: 28 December 1999 (aged 82)

Sport
- Sport: Fencing

Louis Frederique Paulette "Louisette" Malherbaud (28 April 1917 – 28 December 1999) was a French fencer. She competed in the women's individual foil event at the 1948 Summer Olympics.
