= Johan von Koss =

Norwegian fencer

Personal information
- Born: 16 November 1921 Oslo, Norway
- Died: 30 October 2005 (aged 83) Oslo, Norway

Sport
- Sport: Fencing

Johan von Koss (16 November 1921 – 30 October 2005) was a Norwegian épée fencer. He competed at the 1948 and 1952 Summer Olympics.
