= Silvia Strukel =

Italian fencer (1916–1997)

Personal information
- Born: 12 April 1916
- Died: 31 December 1997 (aged 81)

Sport
- Sport: Fencing

Silvia Strukel (12 April 1916 – 31 December 1997) was an Italian fencer. She competed in the women's individual foil event at the 1952 Summer Olympics.
