= Adam Krajewski =

Polish fencer (1929–2000)

Personal information
- Born: 4 October 1929 Lwów, Poland
- Died: 25 October 2000 (aged 71) Wrocław, Poland

Sport
- Sport: Fencing

Adam Krajewski (4 October 1929 – 25 October 2000) was a Polish fencer. He competed in the individual and team épée events at the 1952 Summer Olympics.
