= Yury Deksbakh =

Soviet fencer

Personal information
- Full name: Yury Vsevolodovich Deksbakh
- Born: 10 April 1928 Minsk, Belarus

Sport
- Sport: Fencing

Yury Deksbakh (Russian: Юрий Дексбах; born 10 April 1928) is a Soviet fencer. He competed in the individual and team épée events at the 1952 Summer Olympics.

Deksbakh was born in Minsk.
