= Irena Nawrocka =

Polish fencer (1917–2009)

Personal information
- Born: 3 November 1917 Rzeszów, Austria-Hungary
- Died: 24 November 2009 (aged 92)

Sport
- Sport: Fencing

Irena Nawrocka (3 November 1917 – 24 November 2009) was a Polish fencer. She competed in the women's individual foil events at the 1948 and 1952 Summer Olympics. Nawrocka graduated from the Law School of the Jagiellonian University in 1945. She was a sister of Jan Nawrocki's, who was also an Olympic fencer.

== World War II ==
Nawrocka's escape, along with her first cousin Halina Dobrowolska (during the war, Halina Korabiowska) and three other female Home Army messengers, during their forced march to Ozarow, is documented in The Zookeeper's Wife, Chapter 34. Nawrocka is buried at Bródno Cemetery in Warsaw.
