= Carlos Dias (fencer) =

Portuguese fencer (1910–1995)

Personal information
- Born: 9 March 1910 Lisbon, Portugal
- Died: 1995 (aged 84–85) Lisbon, Portugal

Sport
- Sport: Fencing

Carlos Dias (9 March 1910 – 1995) was a Portuguese épée fencer. He competed at the 1948 and 1952 Summer Olympics.
