= Paul Meister =

Swiss fencer (1926–2018)

Personal information
- Born: 20 January 1926 Basel, Switzerland
- Died: 17 December 2018 (aged 92)

Sport
- Sport: Fencing
Medal record
Men's fencing
Representing Switzerland
Olympic Games
Bronze medal – third place	1952 Helsinki	Épée, team

Paul Meister (20 January 1926 – 17 December 2018) was a Swiss fencer. He won a bronze medal in the team épée event at the 1952 Summer Olympics.
