= Raimondo Carnera =

Danish fencer

Personal information
- Born: 2 February 1915 Copenhagen, Denmark
- Died: 18 January 2002 (aged 86)

Sport
- Sport: Fencing

Raimondo Carnera (2 February 1915 – 18 January 2002) was an Italian-Danish fencer. He competed in the individual and team épée and sabre events at the 1952 Summer Olympics. He became a Danish citizen shortly before the 1952 Olympics. He won 67 Danish championship, 8 individual and 59 in teams. He was Scandinavian champion 8 times. Carnera was a cousin to the Italian heavyweight boxer and world champion Primo Carnera.
