= Mogens Lüchow =

Danish fencer

Personal information
- Nationality: Danish
- Born: 13 May 1918 Copenhagen, Denmark
- Died: 20 March 1989 (aged 70) Copenhagen, Denmark

Sport
- Sport: Fencing
- Team: Fægteklubben Cirklen

Mogens Lüchow (13 May 1918 – 20 March 1989) was a Danish fencer. He competed in the individual and team épée events at the 1948 and 1952 Summer Olympics.
