= Álvaro Pinto =

Portuguese fencer

Personal information
- Born: 4 April 1907
- Died: 1956 (aged 48–49)

Sport
- Sport: Fencing

Álvaro Pinto (4 April 1907 – 1956) was a Portuguese épée fencer. He competed at the 1948 and 1952 Summer Olympics.
