= Charles Stanmore =

Australian fencer

Personal information
- Born: 16 June 1924 Cessnock, New South Wales, Australia
- Died: 25 January 2012 (aged 87)

Sport
- Sport: Fencing

Charles Stanmore (16 June 1924 – 25 January 2012) was an Australian fencer. He competed in four events at the 1952 Summer Olympics.
