= Ronald Parfitt =

British fencer (1913–2011)

Personal information
- Born: Ronald Felix Parfitt; 3 June 1913 Reading or Shirley, Croydon, England
- Died: 4 January 2011 (aged 97) Lincolnshire, England

Sport
- Sport: Fencing

Ronald Felix Parfitt (3 June 1913 – 4 January 2011) was a British fencer and radiotherapist. He competed in the individual and team épée events at the 1948 and 1952 Summer Olympics.

== Biography ==
Parfitt was born in a dentist family in Reading. He attended Guy's Hospital to become a dentist, but qualified as general doctor in 1939. He served in the Royal Army Medical Corps during World War II in North Africa and Europe.

In 1946, he joined the radiation therapy department at Lambeth Hospital, where he worked among others with Theodore Stephanides. Parfitt won the United Kingdom national épée championships in 1948 and 1950. He invented first electric fencing box in England. In 1949 Parfitt married hospital nurse Margaret. His wife died in 2008; they had 2 daughters and 5 grandchildren.
