= César Pekelman =

Brazilian fencer

Personal information
- Born: 20 December 1922
- Died: 1986 (aged 63–64)

Sport
- Sport: Fencing

César Pekelman (20 December 1922 – 1986) is a Brazilian fencer. He competed in the individual and team épée events at the 1952 Summer Olympics.
