= Léon Buck =

Luxembourgish fencer

Personal information
- Born: 16 October 1915 Luxembourg City, Luxembourg
- Died: 20 May 1972 (aged 56)

Sport
- Sport: Fencing

Léon Buck (16 October 1915 – 20 May 1972) was a Luxembourgish épée and foil fencer. He competed at the 1948 and 1952 Summer Olympics.
