= Karen Lachmann =

Danish fencer (1916–1962)

Personal information
- Born: 30 May 1916 Peking, China
- Died: 30 September 1962 (aged 46) Gentofte, Denmark

Sport
- Sport: Fencing
Medal record
Women's fencing
Representing Denmark
Olympic Games
Silver medal – second place	1948 London	Foil, Individual
Bronze medal – third place	1952 Helsinki	Foil, Individual

Karen Vilhelmine Lachmann (30 May 1916 – 30 September 1962) was a Danish foil fencer. She won a silver medal in the women's individual foil event at the 1948 Summer Olympics and a bronze in the same event at the 1952 Summer Olympics.

== Life ==
Lachmann was born in Beijing, China to mother Ingeborg Møller (1889–1963) and father, Vilhelm Petersen (1877–1964).

With her mother's second marriage to lithographer Aksel Lachmann, Karen and her two sisters were adopted by their mother's wealthy family in Copenhagen. In their new family, the three sisters were given the opportunity to practice different sports, and Karen chose fencing, which had become an option for women from around the turn of the twentieth century. However, it was primarily a sport for the wealthy, as it required intensive, individual instruction. All of that was possible in Karen's new family.

Karen Lachmann participated in four Olympic Games: 1936 in Berlin, 1948 in London, 1952 in Helsinki and 1956 in Melbourne. At all four, she reached the final round with the following results: In 1936 she achieved fifth place, in 1948 she won a silver medal, in 1952 bronze and in 1956, she came in sixth.

In Denmark, she won the country championship every year from 1951 to 1957. After recovering from major surgery in 1958, she returned to fencing and won her last individual Danish championship in 1959.

Lachmann was trained as a secretary and was employed for many years at the University of Copenhagen's Department of Pharmacology.
