= Giovanni Bertorelli =

Venezuelan fencer

Personal information
- Born: 7 December 1928
- Died: 25 April 2006 (aged 77)

Sport
- Sport: Fencing

Giovanni Bertorelli (7 December 1928 – 25 April 2006) was a Venezuelan fencer. He competed in the individual and team foil and épée events at the 1952 Summer Olympics.
