= Mohamed Abdel Rahman (fencer) =

Egyptian fencer (1915–1996)

Personal information
- Born: 15 March 1915
- Died: 12 May 1996 (aged 81)

Sport
- Sport: Fencing
Medal record
Mediterranean Games
Silver medal – second place	1951 Alexandria	Sabre team
Bronze medal – third place	1951 Alexandria	Épée team
Bronze medal – third place	1955 Barcelona	Sabre team
Bronze medal – third place	1955 Barcelona	Épée team

Mohamed Fathallah Abdel Rahman (15 March 1915 – 12 May 1996) was an Egyptian épée and foil fencer. He competed at the 1936, 1948 and 1952 Summer Olympics. He competed at the Mediterranean Games in 1951 where he won a silver medal in the sabre team event and a bronze medal in the épée team event and in 1955 where he won a bronze medal in the sabre and épée team events.
