= René Dybkær =

Danish scientist and fencer (1926–2019)

Personal information
- Born: 7 February 1926 Copenhagen, Denmark
- Died: 29 April 2019 (aged 93)

Sport
- Sport: Fencing

René Dybkær (7 February 1926 – 29 April 2019) was a Danish scientist and fencer. He competed at the 1948 and 1952 Summer Olympics. He was most known for his activities about introducing the SI units in clinical laboratories.
