= Kate Mahaut =

Danish fencer

Personal information
- Full name: Kate Yvonne Holgersen-Mahaut-Thorsen
- Nationality: Danish
- Born: 16 January 1908 Frederiksberg, Denmark
- Died: 2 March 1988 (aged 80) Frederiksberg, Denmark

Sport
- Sport: Fencing
- Club: Akademisk Fægteklub

Kate Yvonne Holgersen-Mahaut-Thorsen (16 January 1908 – 2 March 1988) was a Danish fencer. She competed in the women's individual foil events at the 1948 and 1952 Summer Olympics.

She was part of the team that won the World Cup in foil for women in 1947 and 1948.

She was married with the French fencer Leonce Mahaut until his death in 1950, and married for a second time to Adolph Thorsen in 1960.
