= Jean-Baptiste Maquet =

Belgian fencer (1922–1999)

Personal information
- Full name: Jean-Baptiste Mathis Maquet
- Born: 6 February 1922
- Died: 30 August 1999 (aged 77) Messancy, Belgium

Sport
- Sport: Fencing

Jean-Baptiste Maquet (6 February 1922 – 30 August 1999) was a Belgian fencer. He competed in the individual and team épée events at the 1952 Summer Olympics.
