= Ghislain Delaunois =

Belgian fencer

Personal information
- Born: 20 December 1923
- Died: 12 December 1992 (aged 68) Cessales, Haute-Garonne, Belgium

Sport
- Sport: Fencing

Ghislain Albert Hector Delaunois (20 December 1923 – 12 December 1992) was a Belgian fencer. He competed at the 1952 and 1956 Summer Olympics.
