= Andrzej Przeździecki =

Polish fencer

Personal information
- Born: 26 November 1926 Warsaw, Poland
- Died: 6 January 2011 (aged 84) Warsaw, Poland

Sport
- Sport: Fencing

Andrzej Przeździecki (28 November 1926 – 6 January 2011) was a Polish fencer. He competed in the individual and team épée events at the 1952 Summer Olympics.
