= Paul Barth (fencer) =

Swiss fencer (1921–1974)

Personal information
- Born: 9 May 1921
- Died: February 1974 (aged 52)

Sport
- Sport: Fencing
Medal record
Men's fencing
Representing Switzerland
Olympic Games
Bronze medal – third place	1952 Helsinki	Épée, team

Paul Barth (9 May 1921 – February 1974) was a Swiss fencer. He won a bronze medal in the team épée event at the 1952 Summer Olympics.
