= Wojciech Rydz =

Polish fencer (1932–2018)

Personal information
- Born: 9 March 1932 Mysłowice, Poland
- Died: 8 January 2018 (aged 85) Kraków, Poland

Sport
- Sport: Fencing

Wojciech Rydz (9 March 1932 – 8 January 2018) was a Polish fencer. He competed in the individual and team épée events at the 1952 Summer Olympics.
