= Mario Valota =

Swiss fencer

Personal information
- Born: 8 February 1918
- Died: 30 September 2000 (aged 82)

Sport
- Sport: Fencing
Medal record
Men's fencing
Representing Switzerland
Olympic Games
Bronze medal – third place	1952 Helsinki	Épée, team

Mario Valota (8 February 1918 – 30 September 2000) was a Swiss fencer. He won a bronze medal in the team épée event at the 1952 Summer Olympics.
