= Hedwig Rieder =

Swiss fencer

Personal information
- Born: 8 March 1920
- Died: 13 April 1978 (aged 58)

Sport
- Sport: Fencing

Hedwig Rieder (8 March 1920 – 13 April 1978) was a Swiss fencer. She competed in the women's individual foil events at the 1948 and 1952 Summer Olympics.
