= Venezuela at the 1952 Summer Olympics =

- IOC code: VEN
- NOC: Venezuelan Olympic Committee

in Helsinki, Finland 19 July–3 August 1952
- Competitors: 38 in 8 sports
- Flag bearer: Asnoldo Devonish
- Medals Ranked 40th: Gold 0 Silver 0 Bronze 1 Total 1

Summer Olympics appearances (overview)
- 1948; 1952; 1956; 1960; 1964; 1968; 1972; 1976; 1980; 1984; 1988; 1992; 1996; 2000; 2004; 2008; 2012; 2016; 2020; 2024; 2028

Venezuela competed at the 1952 Summer Olympics held in Helsinki, Finland. The Venezuelan Olympic Committee selected 38 competitors, 36 men and two women, to take part in 37 events across eight sports. This was a much greater turnout than 1948, Venezuela's only previous entry, which had only one athlete. For the first time, women represented Venezuela at the Summer Olympics. Women have been absent in the Venezuelan team on four occasions, including the next Summer Games held in Melbourne.

Venezuela won one medal at the Games, a bronze in triple jump; the medalist, Asnoldo Devonish, was almost not included in the team, and competed at the Games while injured.

== Background ==
=== Organization ===
After their debut at the previous 1948 Summer Olympics, Venezuela began forming a national team for the 1952 Games. Venezuela was the 61st country to register with the International Olympic Committee for entry at the 1952 Olympic Games, and received one handbook for all events except Cycling and Arts, for which it received two. The main body of the Venezuelan delegation, which comprised a total of 61 men and four women (athletes and officials), arrived in Helsinki for the Games on 7 July; in Finland, Venezuela's Olympic attaché was Olavi Mattila. Additionally, five press passes were issued for the country.

=== Devonish's selection ===
In 1951, Asnoldo Devonish won the gold medal in triple jump in the Bolivarian Games with a distance of 15 m, his best result in the event. Thanks to this win, he was entitled and encouraged to join the Olympic team, however, Venezuelan athletic organizations, including the Venezuelan Olympic Committee (VOC), were opposed to Devonish joining. At the time, he was injured and was a better long jumper than triple jumper. Prior to the Games, his coach, Ladislao Lazar, said that he would not allow any of his athletes to compete at Helsinki if Devonish was not on the team. Devonish competed at the Games while still injured.

== Medalists ==
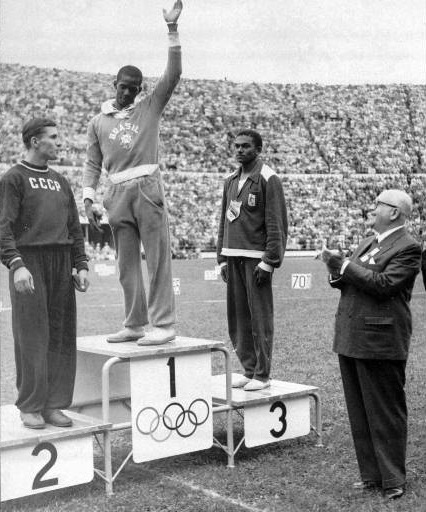
Devonish receiving his bronze medal at the games

The 20-year-old Devonish was the 1952 Games' only medal winner for Venezuela, and the country's first Olympic medalist; he subsequently became the first person inducted into Venezuela's Sporting Hall of Fame. He recalled that he had made a bet for two dollars before the medal ceremony that he would not cry during the Venezuelan national anthem but that he lost, becoming emotional as Venezuelans watching sang along and the flag was raised.

Devonish remained the only Venezuelan Olympic medalist in track and field events until Yulimar Rojas in Rio 2016; Rojas won a silver medal, also in the triple jump.

Medal	Name	Sport	Event	Date
Bronze	Asnoldo Devonish	Athletics	Men's Triple Jump	23 July

== Opening ceremony ==
Venezuela, per Finnish alphabetical order of countries, marched 65th in the Opening ceremony. There were 58 people representing Venezuela in the ceremony. The flag bearer for Venezuela at the 1952 Olympics was Asnoldo Devonish.

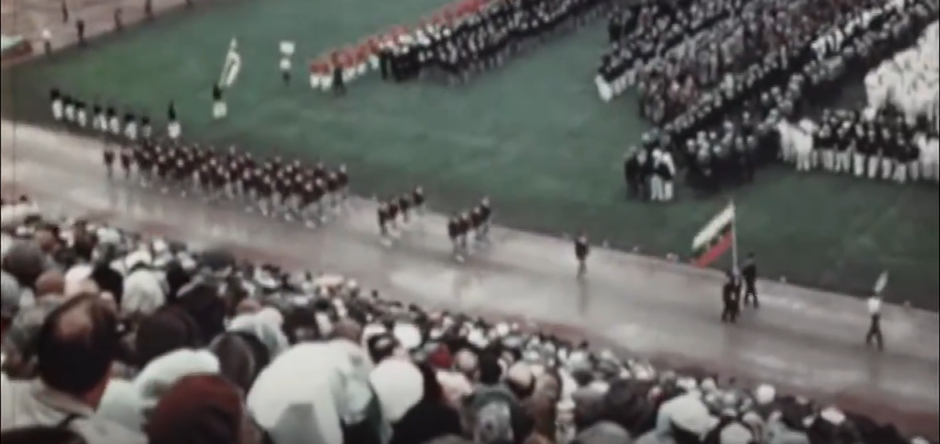
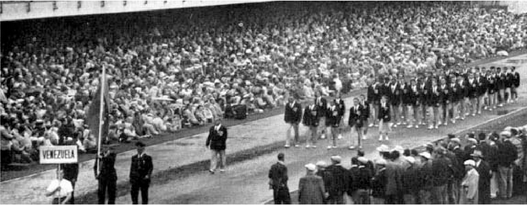
Venezuela in the Opening ceremony

== Competitors ==
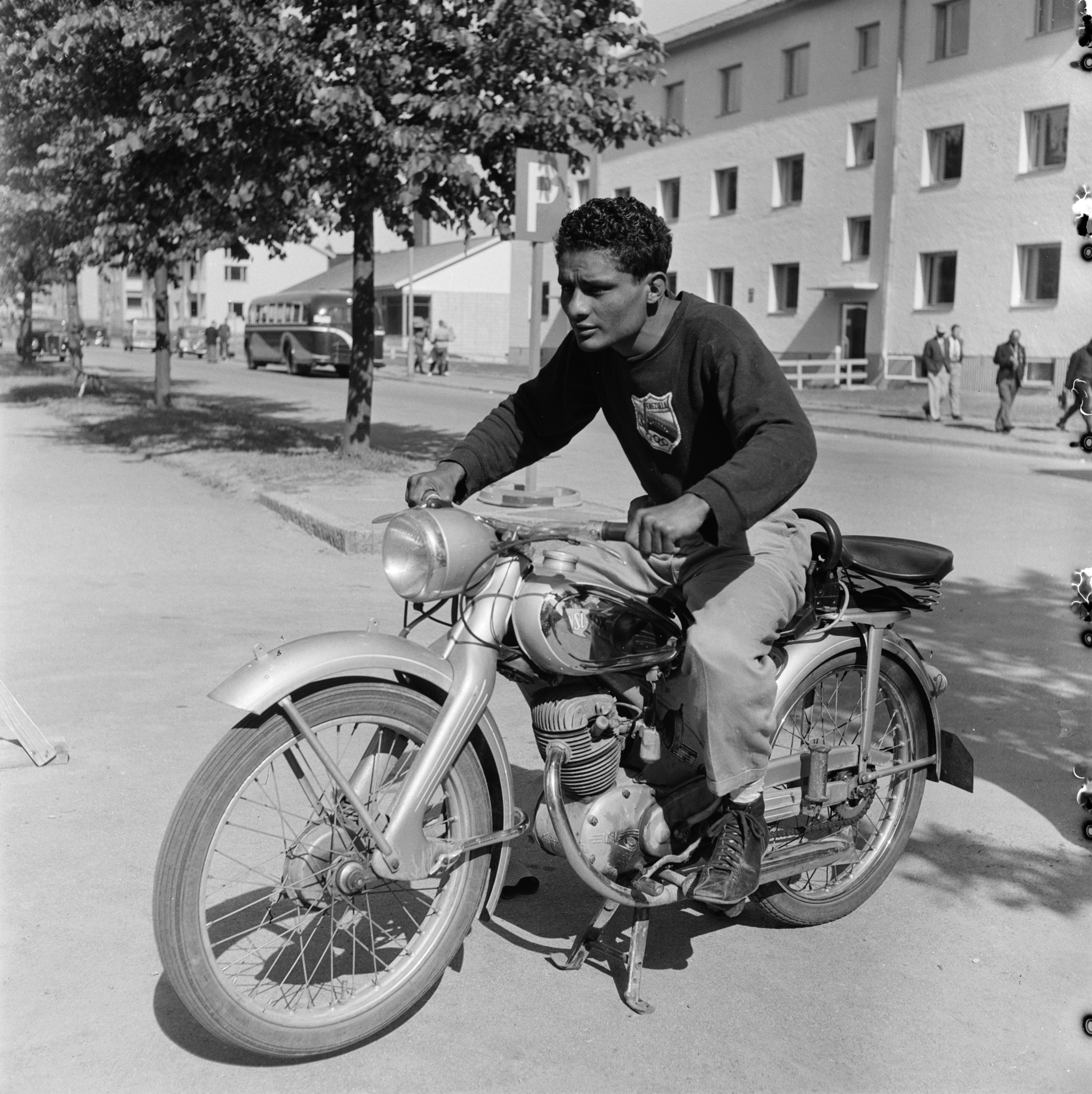
A member of the delegation at the Olympic village

In 1952, women were part of the Venezuelan Olympic delegation for the first time, with the country including two female athletes, both fencers: Gerda Muller and Ursula Selle. On only four occasions has the country not included female athletes, in 1948 and 1956 (the Games immediately before and after this instance), and later in 1968 and 1980. Until the 2000s, female participation was low.

Competing for Venezuela were 38 athletes in 37 events across eight sports. The male Venezuelan competitors were housed in building seven of the Käpylä Olympic Village, along with a few athletes from hosts Finland (most Finnish athletes were housed in an elite athletic facility on the island of Santahamina), and eight other countries' athletes, including those of Spain, Uruguay, and Mexico. Venezuela's female competitors, along with all female competitors from non-Communist countries, were housed in a local nursing college that had been transformed for the Olympics, called the Women's Village. During the Games, ten Venezuelan competitors were treated by the medical team.

Sport	Men	Women	Total
Athletics	7	0	7
Boxing	5	0	5
Cycling	4	0	4
Fencing	8	2	10
Diving	1	0	1
Shooting	7	0	7
Swimming	1	0	1
Wrestling	3	0	3
Total	36	2	38

== Aquatics ==
=== Swimming ===
Swimming events took place between 25 July and 2 August at the Helsinki Swimming Stadium, with many of the athletes under the age of 20. Venezuela was represented by one athlete in one event.

Men's 100 m freestyle

The 19-year-old Oscar Saiz competed in the men's 100 m freestyle on 26 July. He was in heat five of the qualifiers, placing sixth out of seven in his heat and not qualifying; he ranked 41st overall out of 61 competitors in the heats. 1952 was Saiz's only Olympic Games.

Saiz was a student in London and coached by the Australian Sep Prosser, by air mail.

Athlete	Event	Round One		Semifinals		Final	
Athlete	Event	Time	Rank	Time	Rank	Time	Rank
Oscar Saiz	100 metres freestyle	1:01.7	6	did not advance			

=== Diving ===
The diving events were held between 27 July and 2 August at the Helsinki Swimming Stadium; the pool was heated but the air was cold, with the official Olympic report suggesting divers would have "felt the wind and chill more than anyone else". One athlete represented Venezuela at one event. Athletes competing in diving events had a special registration form, where they filled out the dives they requested to perform. In diving, seven judges visually assess the performance and hold up score cards, with the highest and lowest scores awarded being discounted and the rest added together before being divided by five (the number of scores) to give the mean. The mean is then multiplied by the difficulty ranking of the dive for the complete score for that dive.

Men's 3 m springboard

The 26-year-old Eduardo Fereda competed for Venezuela on the 3 m springboard on 28 July. In the qualifying rounds he completed six successful dives, with dive scores ranging from 4.80 to 9.20 (each placing him between 36th and 28th overall); his total score was 41.98, ultimately ranking him 36th out of 36 and so not qualifying for the final. Fereda would later compete in trampolining, but 1952 was his only Olympic Games.

Athlete	Event	Preliminaries		Final	
Athlete	Event	Points	Rank	Points	Rank
Eduardo Fereda	3 m springboard	41.98	36	did not advance	

== Athletics ==
Athletics events were held between 20 and 27 July at the Helsinki Olympic Stadium. Seven athletes, all men, represented Venezuela in eleven events.

=== Track ===
In sprint events (100, 200 and 400 metres), athletes were drawn in 12 heats. The best three of every heat qualified to the quarterfinals, with the best two of each of these advancing. In middle distance events (800 and 1500 metres), athletes were drawn in heats and the best three or four of every heat would qualify to the semifinals, where the best three or six of each then advanced. In the 110 metres hurdles, athletes were drawn in six heats: the best two qualified to the semifinals, and the best three of each semi then advanced to the final.

Juan Leiva, Guillermo Gutiérrez, Filemón Camacho, and Teófilo Davis all competed in two events (Davis with one each in track and field). Paulino Ferrer contested one event. This was the only Olympic appearance of all five athletes.

Athlete	Event	Heat		Quarterfinal		Semifinal		Final	
Athlete	Event	Result	Rank	Result	Rank	Result	Rank	Result	Rank
Juan Leiva	100 metres	11.31	5	did not advance		did not advance			
Juan Leiva	200 metres	22.38	3	did not advance		did not advance			
Guillermo Gutiérrez	100 metres	11.42	5	did not advance		did not advance			
Guillermo Gutiérrez	400 metres	48.82	2 Q	48.75	4	did not advance			
Filemón Camacho	800 metres	2:00	5	did not advance		did not advance			
Filemón Camacho	1500 metres	4:18	7	did not advance		did not advance			
Teófilo Davis	110 metres hurdles	15.96	5	did not advance		did not advance			
Paulino Ferrer	400 metres hurdles	1:02	5	did not advance		did not advance			

Men's 100 m sprint

Two Venezuelans competed in the 100 m sprint event; 19-year-old Juan Leiva and 25-year-old Guillermo Gutiérrez. Leiva competed in heat 6, placing 5th with a time of 11.2 (also recorded as 11.31), not qualifying. Gutiérrez competed in heat 4, also placing 5th with a time of 11.2 (also recorded as 11.42), also not qualifying.

Men's 200 m sprint

Juan Leiva was Venezuela's only competitor in the 200 m sprint. He placed 3rd in heat 5, with a time of 22.3 (also recorded as 22.38), not qualifying.

Men's 400 m sprint

Guillermo Gutiérrez was Venezuela's only competitor in the 400 m sprint, where he was more successful. He placed 2nd in heat 6, qualifying with a time of 48.7 (also recorded as 48.82); in the quarterfinals he came 4th in the first group, with a time of 48.6 (also recorded as 48.75), not advancing.

Men's 800 m race

The 25-year-old Filemón Camacho was the only Venezuelan runner in the 800 m race. He placed 5th in heat 7, with a time of 2:00.00, not qualifying.

Men's 1500 m race

Camacho also contested the 1500 m race, again the only Venezuelan. He placed 7th in heat 1, with a time of 4:18.00, not qualifying.

Men's 110 m hurdles

The 22-year-old Teófilo Davis was Venezuela's only athlete in the 110 m hurdles race. He placed 5th in heat 3 with a time of 15.7 (also recorded as 15.96), not qualifying.

Men's 400 m hurdles

The 25-year-old Paulino Ferrer was Venezuela's only athlete in the 400 m hurdles race. He came 5th in heat 4 with a time of 62.1 (or 1:02.1), not qualifying. He was placed 36th out of 40 athletes in the event.

=== Field ===
In jumping events (long, high and triple jump) athletes begin in a pooled qualifying round, where every athlete who achieved the qualifying criteria (7.20 m for long jump, 1.87 m for high jump and 14.55 m for triple jump), or the twelve best performances including ties in the long jump only, advance to the finals. In the final round, athletes have three attempts to clear several ascending mark barriers. In the javelin throw event athletes must achieve 64.00 m in order to qualify for the finals.

Three athletes represented Venezuela in field events; Brígido Iriarte competed in two field events, with Teófilo Davis and Asnoldo Devonish each competing in one. The 1952 Games is the only one these men competed at.

Athlete	Event	Qualifying		Final	
Athlete	Event	Distance	Position	Distance	Position
Brígido Iriarte	Long jump	6.82	20	Did not advance	
Brígido Iriarte	Javelin throw	52.13	26	Did not advance	
Teófilo Davis	High jump	1.87	27 Q	1.80	24
Asnoldo Devonish	Triple jump	15.24	2 Q	15.52	3rd place, bronze medalist(s)

Men's Long jump

The 31-year-old Brígido Iriarte was in Group A for the long jump qualifiers. He fouled his first two jumps and landed 6.82 m on his third, placing 9th in the group and 20th overall, not meeting the qualifying height of 7.20 m.

Men's Javelin

In the javelin, Iriarte placed 13th out of 13 in Group A and 26th of all athletes in qualifying, with a throw of 52.13 m, which he achieved on his first attempt (his other two attempts were at shorter distances each time). He did not qualify.

Men's High jump

Davis is listed in the high jump record as T. S. D. Bell. For the event, the qualifying height was 187 cm, with all athletes who successful jumped this advancing to the final. Davis cleared this on his last attempt, placing 13th in Group A and 27th in qualifying out of 28. In the final, he successfully jumped 170 cm and 180 cm on his first attempts, but then missed 190 cm all three times, placing joint-24th.

Men's Triple jump

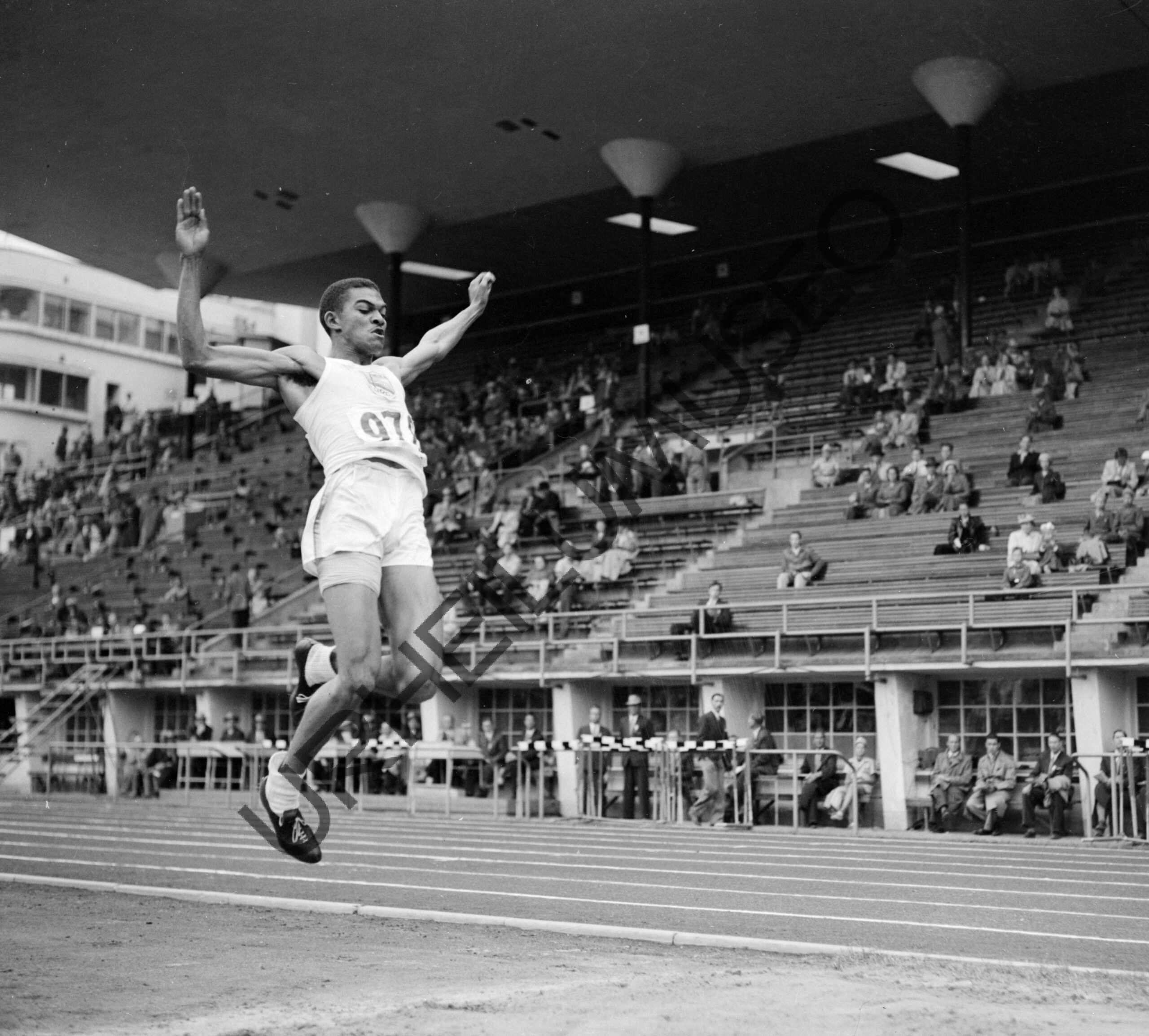
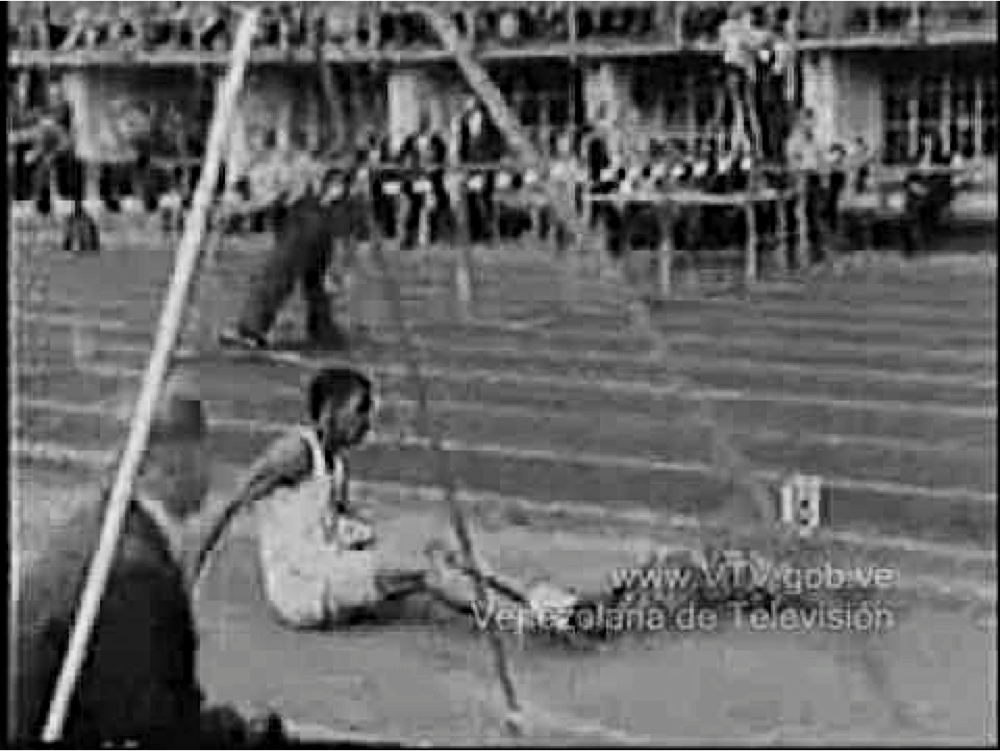
Devonish mid-flight of a jump (left) and landing his bronze medal-winning jump (right)

The triple jump competition was held on 23 July 1952. In the qualifying rounds, Asnoldo Devonish was in Group A, achieving the second-longest jump of all competing athletes during this stage, comfortably qualifying for the final. His first jump in the qualifiers placed him 7th, his second jump took him to 2nd, and he passed the third. In the final, Devonish's second jump measured 15.52 m, his furthest. At this point, he was in second place, passing the third jump, but falling into third place. His other attempts were all fouls.

Devonish's coach, Ladislao Lazar, was celebrated in the Venezuelan press for insisting he compete while injured.

=== Combined ===
Men's Decathlon

Brígido Iriarte also contested the track and field decathlon. He placed 12th of the 21 athletes who completed the decathlon (out of 28 competing).

Athlete	Event	Total Points	Position
Brígido Iriarte	Decathlon	5,770	12

Athlete	100 metres		Long Jump		Shot Put		High Jump		400 metres		110m H		Discus Throw		Pole Vault		Javelin Throw		1500 metres	
Athlete	Time	Points	Dis	Points	Dis	Points	Dis	Points	Time	Points	Time	Points	Dis	Points	Dis	Points	Dis	Points	Time	Points
Brígido Iriarte	11.06	707	7.06	804	11.66	552	1.60	555	53.1	636	16.6	489	38.23	578	3.40	476	55.55	637	4:49.8	336

In the overall points table, Iriarte was in joint-16th after the first event, the 100 m sprint; after the long jump he moved up to 9th, where he stayed after the shot put. He dropped back down to 16th after the high jump, moving slightly up to 15th after the 400 m sprint. He stayed in 15th after the 110 m hurdles, moving into 14th after the discus and staying there after the pole vault. He then moved up to 13th after the javelin throw and then into 12th after the final event, the 1500 m race.

In the individual events, Iriarte ran in heat 4 of the 100 m sprint, coming 2nd in the heat before placing joint-16th in the deciding race. He placed joint-4th in the long jump but 19th in the shot put and joint-22nd in the high jump. He ran in heat 6 of the 400 m sprint, coming 3rd in the heat and then 17th in the final race. In heat 2 of the 110 m hurdles, Iriarte placed 2nd, coming joint-19th in the race. Throwing discus, he came 10th, in the pole vault he was joint-16th, and throwing javelin he was 5th. He ran in heat 3 for the 1500 m race, placing 3rd, and then came 7th in the 1500 m decider.

== Boxing ==
Boxing events were contested between 28 July and 2 August at the Messuhalli Hall in Helsinki. The sport saw a large increase in entries, in part due to many weight categories, but also because of countries like Venezuela entering the ring for the first time. In Helsinki, there were ten weigh-ins rather than the previous eight. Other changes include the semi-finals losers both being awarded a diploma instead of fighting for bronze.

Athlete	Event	Round One	Round Two	Quarterfinals	Semifinals	Final	
Athlete	Event	Opposition Result	Opposition Result	Opposition Result	Opposition Result	Opposition Result	Rank
Ángel Amaya	Bantamweight	Macías (MEX); L 0-3	did not advance				
Luis Aranguren	Featherweight	Schirra (SAA); L 1-2	did not advance				
Vicente Matute	Lightweight	BYE	Ali (PAK); W KO	Pakkanen (FIN); L 0-3	did not advance		
Salomon Carrizales	Light-Welterweight	Pinto (BRA); W 2-1	Adkins (USA); L 0-3	did not advance			
Sergio Gascue	Welterweight	Linca (ROU); L 0-3	did not advance				

Men's bantamweight

The 18-year-old Angel Amaya lost his bantamweight bout 3-0 to place joint-17th overall, out of 23.

Men's featherweight

The 21-year-old Luis Aranguren, representing Venezuelan in the featherweight boxing, lost his bout 2–1, placing joint-17th out of 30 competing athletes.

Men's lightweight

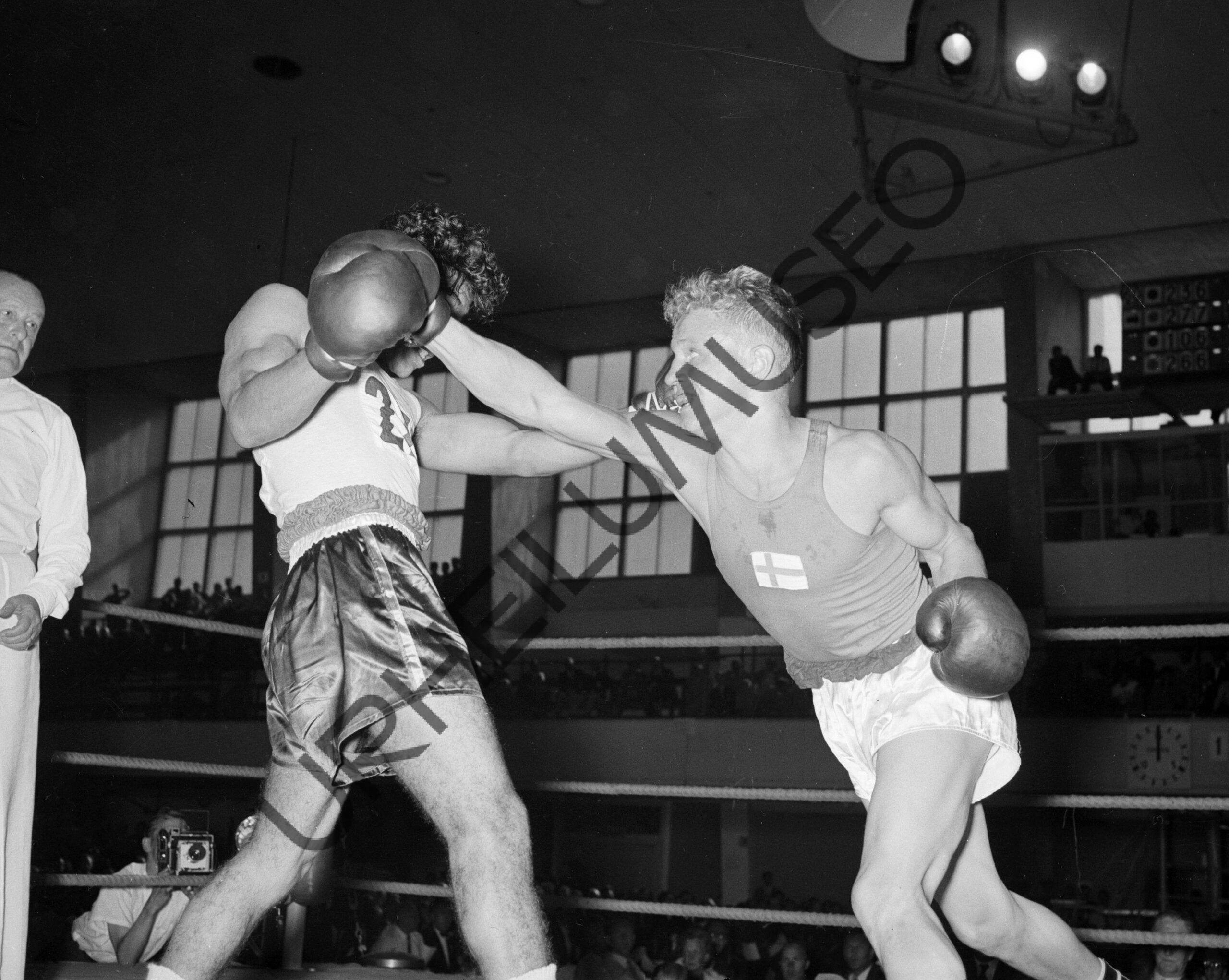
Vicente Matute (left) in his bout with Erkki Pakkanen

In his first bout, 19-year-old Vicente Matute faced no opponent and had a bye to the second round; here he won by knocking out his opponent. In the quarterfinal, Matute lost 3–0, placing joint 5th.

Men's light welterweight

The 19-year-old Salomon Carrizales, contesting the light welterweight, defeated his opponent in the first round 2–1. In the second round, he lost 3–0, to the eventual gold medalist. He placed joint 9th.

Men's welterweight

The 19-year-old Sergio Gascue fought his bout in the welterweight division, being defeated 3–0 in the first round. He came joint 17th.

== Cycling ==
=== Track ===
Track cycling events were held at the Helsinki Velodrome. Four athletes represented Venezuela in 3 events.

Men's 1000 m time trial

Athlete	Event	Rank	Time
Andoni Ituarte	1000 m time trial	15	1:15.4

In the 1000 m time trial, each athlete rode separately against the clock. The 32-year-old Andoni Ituarte came joint-15th with a time of 1:15.4.

Men's sprint

The sprint was a scratch race over 1000 m, contested in heats. Heat winners continued to the quarterfinals, and those who lost contested a repechage to proceed.

Athlete	Event	Round 1	Repechage 1	Quarterfinals	Repechage 2	Semifinals	Repechage 3	Final	
Athlete	Event	Opposition Time	Opposition Time	Opposition Time	Opposition Time	Opposition Time	Opposition Time	Opposition Time	Rank
Luis Toro	Sprint	Hijzelendoorn (NED); Robinson (RSA); Hromjak (USA); L	Potzernheim (GER); Dadunashvili (URS); Hromjak (USA); Törn (FIN); L	did not advance					

Venezuela's 26-year-old Luis Toro was drawn in heat 8, coming last. He then contested the first heat of the repechage, coming third.

Men's team pursuit

Athlete	Event	Qualifying		Quarterfinals	Semifinals	Final	
Athlete	Event	Time	Rank	Opposition Time	Opposition Time	Opposition Time	Rank
Luis Toro; Danilo Heredia; Andoni Ituarte; Ramón Echegaray	Team Pursuit	5:16.2	20	did not advance			

In the 4000 m team pursuit, Venezuela came 20th, with a time of 5:16.2; the team was Ituarte, Toro, 24-year-old Danilo Heredia, and 17-year-old Ramón Echegaray. They did not advance out of the qualifying round.

== Fencing ==
The fencing events took place at the Westend Tennis Hall, which was 11 kilometres (6.8 miles) from the Olympic Village. Ten fencers (eight men and two women) represented Venezuela in fencing. Venezuelan fencer Gerda Muller, aged 15, was the youngest participant at the Games.

=== Men ===
Athlete	Event	Round One		Quarterfinal		Semifinal		Final Pool	
Athlete	Event	Opposition	Rank	Opposition	Rank	Opposition	Rank	Opposition	Rank
Juan Kavanagh	Individual foil	Magnusson (SWE) Bokun (URS); Galimi (ARG) Paul (GBR); Lund (AUS) Asselin (CAN)	6	did not advance					
Augusto Gutiérrez	Individual foil	Chelaru (ROU) Lubell (USA); Ramos (MEX) Midler (URS); Bach (SAA) Rimini (URU)	Tie on 6	did not advance					
Giovanni Bertorelli	Individual foil	Klette (NOR) Rydström (SWE); Wendon (GBR) Fethers (AUS); Eisenecker (GER) Duffy (IRL); Rau (SAA)	8	did not advance					
Giovanni Bertorelli; Nelson Nieves; Juan Kavanagh; Gustavo Gutiérrez; Augusto Gutiérrez	Team foil	Great Britain; Italy	3	did not advance					
Gustavo Gutiérrez	Individual épée	Krajewski (POL) Haro (MEX); Kerttula (FIN) Sákovics (HUN); Eriksen (NOR) Henrion (BEL); López (GUA)	Tie on 5	did not advance					
Giovanni Bertorelli	Individual épée	Rerrich (HUN) Jay (GBR); Pekelman (BRA) Rydz (POL); Deksbakh (URS) Chelaru (ROU); Duffy (IRL)	Tie on 7	did not advance					
Juan Camous	Individual épée	Berzsenyi (HUN) Wiik (FIN); Ramos (MEX) Bougnol (FRA); Skrobisch (USA) Kroggel (GER); Maki (JPN)	5	did not advance					
Gustavo Gutiérrez; Giovanni Bertorelli; Olaf Sandner; Juan Camous	Team épée	Belgium; Denmark; Portugal	4	did not advance					
Olaf Sandner	Individual sabre	Loisel (AUT) Suski (POL); Pomini (ARG) Santo (ROU); Ruben (DEN) Lund (AUS); Menegalli (SUI)	7	did not advance					
Gustavo Gutiérrez	Individual sabre	Heywaert (BEL) Manayenko (URS); Pawłowski (POL) Carnera (DEN); Rau (SAA) Fethers (AUS); Cámara (MEX)	8	did not advance					
Edmundo López	Individual sabre	Tudor (ROU) Van Der Auwera (BEL); Nordin (SWE) Amez-Droz (SUI); Liebscher (GER) López (GUA); Knödler (SAA)	Tie on 6	did not advance					
Augusto Gutiérrez; Olaf Sandner; Gustavo Gutiérrez; Edmundo López	Team sabre	Austria; Italy	3	did not advance					

Men's Individual foil

In the individual foil event, 21-year-old Augusto Gutiérrez was drawn in pool 1, losing all pairings to place joint-6th in that group. The 20-year-old Juan Kavanagh was in pool 2, winning one of his pairings but placing 6th, and 23-year-old Giovanni Bertorelli was in pool 5, losing all his pairings and placing 8th. None of them advanced.

Men's Team foil

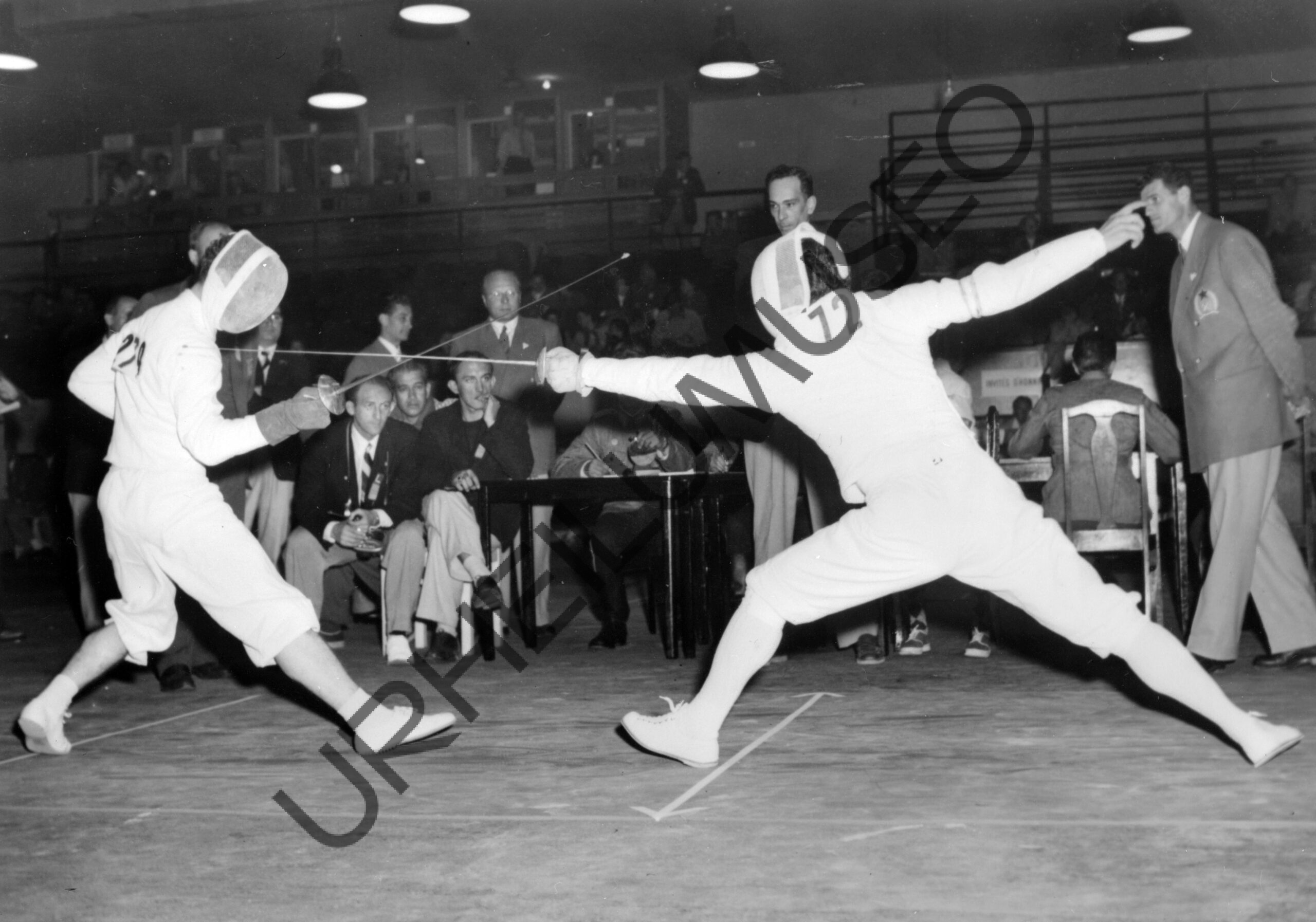
Kavanagh (left) fencing with Manlio Di Rosa of Italy

In the first round of the team foil, the Venezuelan team was drawn in pool 3, competing against Great Britain and Italy. Against Great Britain, only 19-year-old Gustavo Gutiérrez won any pairings, but they were defeated 14–2. With the team slightly changed for the pairings against Italy (swapping 17-year-old Nieves Croes for A. Gutiérrez), they still lost, this time 9–0, coming bottom of the group.

Men's Individual épée

In the individual épée event, G. Gutiérrez was in pool 1, winning two pairings but losing four, placing joint 5th. Bertorelli was in pool 3, winning one pairing and losing six to come joint 7th. Camous was in pool 7, and won three pairings, losing four to place 5th.

Men's Team épée

For the team épée, Venezuela was drawn in pool 4, and again lost their matches. The other countries in this pool were Denmark, Belgium, and Portugal. Against Denmark they lost 9–5, with G. Gutiérrez, Bertorelli, and 28-year-old Olaf Sandner each winning one pairing. Juan Camous won two of his. Against Belgium they lost 11–4, with each man winning one pairing. They did not play Portugal, but came bottom of the group.

Men's Individual sabre

Venezuela's three individual sabre fencers were Sandner, G. Gutiérrez, and the 16-year-old Edmundo López. In pool 1, Sandner won two pairings and lost five, placing 7th. In pool 4, G. Gutiérrez won one and lost five, placing 8th. In pool 6, López won one and lost six, coming joint 6th. None of them advanced.

Men's Team sabre

In the team sabre, Venezuela was drawn in pool 2, competing against Austria and Italy. They lost to Austria 13–3, with López winning two pairings and G. Gutiérrez winning one. Against Italy, they lost 9–1, with Sandner taking the only win for the team. They placed bottom of the group.

=== Women ===
Athlete	Event	Round One		Quarterfinal		Semifinal		Final Pool	
Athlete	Event	Opposition	Rank	Opposition	Rank	Opposition	Rank	Opposition	Rank
Ursula Selle	Individual foil	Lachmann (DEN) Camber-Corno (ITA); Buller (GBR) Shitikova (URS); Kalka (FIN) Włodarczyk (POL)	6	did not advance					
Gerda Muller	Individual foil	Elek (HUN) Drand (FRA); Irigoyen (ARG) Wenisch-Filz (AUT); Sjöblom (FIN)	Tie on 5	did not advance					

Women's Individual foil

Both Venezuela's female athletes, Muller and 19-year-old Ursula Selle, were fencers, and both competed in the individual foil.

Selle was drawn in pool 2, winning two pairings and losing four, to place 6th in the group. Muller was in pool 6, losing four pairings and winning none, coming joint-5th. Neither advanced.

== Shooting ==
Venezuela competed in Olympic Shooting for the first time in 1952, as one of the ten new teams to the event this year.

The shooting events were held between 25 and 29 July at the Malmi Shooting Range. There were seven events, but with some restrictions: each country could only enter two athletes per event, and the small-bore rifle events (if both are being contested by the country) must be contested by the same athlete(s).

Athlete	Event	Final	
Athlete	Event	Points	Rank
Herman Barreto	Rapid fire pistol, 25 metres	558	20
Carlos Monteverde	Rapid fire pistol, 25 metres	483	52
Hector de Lima Polanco	Free pistol, 50 metres	506	37
Carlos Marrero	Free pistol, 50 metres	483	48
Rigoberto Rivero	Free rifle, three positions, 300 metres	1,028	22
Humberto Briceño	Free rifle, three positions, 300 metres	984	25
Humberto Briceño	Small-bore rifle, three positions, 50 metres	1,104	33
Humberto Briceño	Small-bore rifle, prone, 50 metres	393	35
Rafael Arnal	Small-bore rifle, three positions, 50 metres	1,083	39
Rafael Arnal	Small-bore rifle, prone, 50 metres	380	57

Men's free pistol

Venezuela had two representatives in the Free Pistol event, 41-year-old Hector d'Lima Polanco and 37-year-old Carlos Marrero Cabrera. Each athlete fired 60 rounds, in six sets of ten; they could take practice shots before and between sets, up to 18 practice shots. In his sets, de Lima Polanco shot 87, 80, 84, 83, 87 then 85, placing 37th. Marrero shot 80, 80, 82, 81, 82 and 78, placing 48th of 48. de Lima Polanco took part in the same event in the 1956 Melbourne Games, scoring better.

Men's silhouette (rapid fire pistol, 25 m)

The 25-year-old Herman Barreto Avellaneda and 32-year-old Carlos Monteverde Perez competed in the Silhouette, a rapid-fire shooting event over 25 m. Barreto placed 20th out of 53, hitting all of the targets, while Monteverde placed 52nd, hitting 55 targets. There were two courses of 30 rounds, for 60 total, played over two days. Each course was broken down into three sets of ten, each scored out of 100, to give an overall score out of 600. On the first course, Barreto scored 92, 87 and 91 for 270 in 30. On the second course, he scored 97, 97, and 94 for 288 in 30. His score was 60/558. On the first course, Monteverde scored 94, 89 and 77, for 260 in 29. On the second course, he scored 82, 81 and 60 for 223 in 26. His score was 55/483.

Men's free rifle (three positions, 300 m)

Venezuela also had two athletes contest the Free Rifle full set, 38-year-old Rigoberto Rivero Lucena and 24-year-old Humberto Briceño Martinez. In the event, 120 shots were fired in series of ten, which were in sets of three; 40 shots were fired lying prone, 40 while kneeling, and 40 while standing. Up to ten practice shots per position could be taken, before or between the series of ten. Rivero placed 22nd, scoring 365 prone, 333 kneeling, and 330 standing. Briceño placed 25th, scoring 371 prone, 343 kneeling, and 270 standing.

Men's small-bore rifle (three positions, 50 m)

Briceño also contested both small-bore rifle events, as did the 37-year-old Rafael Arnal Myerston. For the first time in the Olympic Games, the small-bore rifle full set was contested (it had previously only been a prone event). It was executed and scored in the same manner as the Free Rifle full set. Briceño placed 33rd, scoring 393 prone, 376 kneeling, and 335 standing, hitting 31 center shots (used to separate athletes with the same scores). Arnal placed 39th, scoring 380 prone, 364 kneeling, and 339 standing, hitting 28 center shots.

Men's small-bore rifle (prone, 50 m)

In the small-bore rifle prone event 40 shots are fired in rounds of ten. Each round is scored out of 100, to give overall scores out of 400. Briceño placed 35th, scoring 97, 98, 99 and 99 for 393, having hit 16 center shots. Arnal placed 57th out of 58, scoring 95, 94, 93 and 98 for 380, having hit 14 center shots.

== Wrestling ==
Wrestling events were contested between 20 and 27 July at the Messuhalli Hall, with weigh-ins conducted in the Olympic Village.

Athlete	Event	Round One	Round Two	Round Three	...	Final Round	
Athlete	Event	Opposition Result	Opposition Result	Opposition Result	Opposition Result	Opposition Result	Rank
Ignacio Lugo	Featherweight	Bernard (CAN); L ^{VT}	Mangave (IND); L ^{DNF-I}	Did not advance			
Pío Chirinos	Middleweight	Reitz (RSA); L ^{VT}	Gocke (GER); L ^{VT}	did not advance			
Rodolfo Padrón	Light-Heavyweight	Wittenberg (USA); L ^{VT}	Palm (SWE); L ^{VT}	Did not advance			

Men's freestyle featherweight

In the freestyle featherweight wrestling, 19-year-old Ignacio Lugo represented Venezuela. In the first round he fought the first match, losing to the Canadian Armand Bernard by falling at 10:55. In the second round he lost by walkover when he defaulted the match due to injury. Before he withdrew, he was tied for 16th.

Men's freestyle middleweight

The 22-year-old Pío Chirinos represented Venezuela in freestyle middleweight wrestling. In the first round he lost by falling at 1:11. In the second round he lost by falling at 1:20, and was eliminated, tying for 12th.

Men's freestyle light heavyweight

The 24-year-old Rodolfo Padron also lost both his matches, representing Venezuela in the freestyle light heavyweight. In the first round he fell at 1:28, and in the second at 2:28, placing joint-10th.
