= Fencing at the 1952 Summer Olympics – Men's sabre =

Olympic fencing event

Men's sabre at the Games of the XV Olympiad
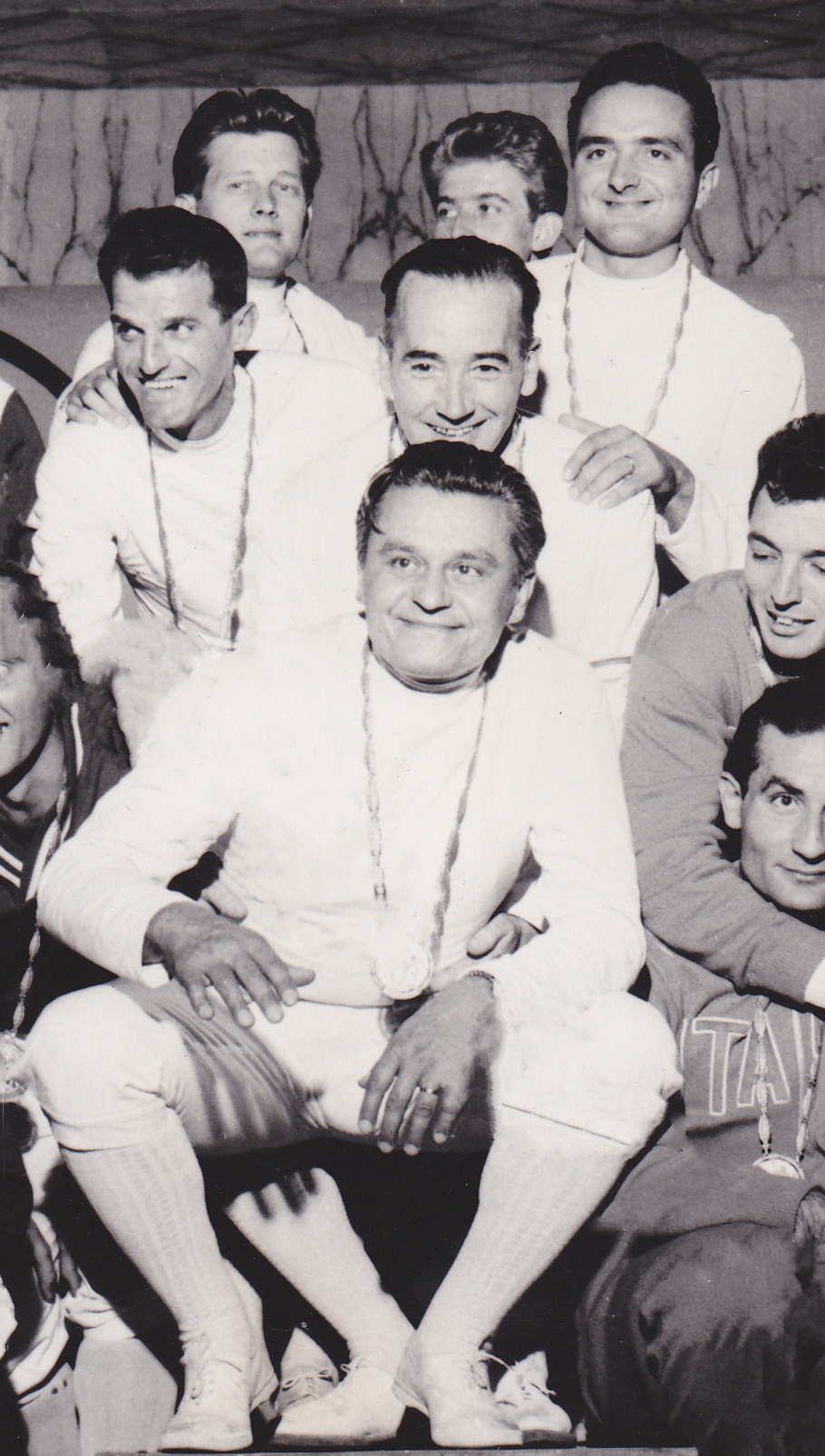
- Pál Kovács (center, crouching) and Aladár Gerevich (center, seated) were mainstays of the Hungarian sabre team for many Games; they are seen here on the podium of the 1960 team event.
- Venue: Westend Tennis Hall, Espoo
- Dates: 31 July – 1 August 1952
- Competitors: 66 from 26 nations

Medalists
1st place, gold medalist(s)		Pál Kovács	Hungary
2nd place, silver medalist(s)		Aladár Gerevich	Hungary
3rd place, bronze medalist(s)		Tibor Berczelly	Hungary

The men's sabre was one of seven fencing events on the fencing at the 1952 Summer Olympics programme. It was the twelfth appearance of the event. The competition was held from 31 July 1952 to 1 August 1952. 66 fencers from 26 nations competed. Nations were limited to three fencers each. The event was won by Pál Kovács, the sixth of nine straight Games in which a Hungarian would win the event. Kovács became the fourth man to win multiple medals in the individual sabre, adding to his 1948 bronze. Hungary swept the medals in the event for the second time (the first was in 1912). Aladár Gerevich's silver completed a set of three different color medals in the event, the first man to win three medals in individual sabre. Tibor Berczelly earned bronze.

== Background ==
This was the 12th appearance of the event, which is the only fencing event to have been held at every Summer Olympics. Seven of the eight finalists from 1948 returned (all except American Tibor Nyilas: gold medalist (and 1936 bronze medalist) Aladár Gerevich of Hungary, silver medalist (and 1936 finalist) Vincenzo Pinton of Italy, bronze medalist Pál Kovács of Hungary, fourth-place finisher Jacques Lefèvre of France, fifth-place finisher George Worth of the United States, sixth-place finisher Gastone Darè of Italy, and eighth-place finisher Antonio Haro of Mexico. Gerevich was the reigning (1951) world champion, with Darè (1949) and Jean Levavasseur of France (1950) other recent world champions competing. Kovács was also a world champion, though not so recently—he had won in 1937.

Australia, Guatemala, Japan, Saar, the Soviet Union, Portugal, and Venezuela each made their debut in the men's sabre. Italy and Denmark each made their 10th appearance in the event, tied for most of any nation, each having missed two of the first three events but having appeared every Games since 1908.

== Competition format ==
The competition format was pool play round-robin, with bouts to five touches. Not all bouts were played in some pools if not necessary to determine advancement. Ties were broken through fence-off bouts ("barrages") in early rounds if necessary for determining advancement. Ties not necessary for advancement were either not broken (if at least one fencer had not finished all bouts in the round-robin) or broken first by touches received and then by touches scored. In the final, ties were broken by barrage if necessary for medal placement but otherwise first by touches received and then by touches scored. The fencers from the top four teams in the team sabre event received a bye in the first round.

- Round 1: There 7 pools of between 7 and 8 fencers each. The top 4 fencers in each pool advanced to the quarterfinals.
- Quarterfinals: There were 5 pools of 8 fencers each. The top 4 fencers in each quarterfinal advanced to the semifinals.
- Semifinals: There were 3 pools of 6 or 7 fencers each. The top 3 fencers in each semifinal advanced to the final.
- Final: The final pool had 9 fencers.

== Schedule ==
All times are Eastern European Summer Time (UTC+3)

Date	Time	Round
Thursday, 31 July 1952	8:00; 15:00	Round 1 Quarterfinals
Friday, 1 August 1952	8:00; 15:00	Semifinals; Final

== Results ==
=== Round 1 ===
The top 4 finishers in each pool advanced to the quarterfinals. Fencers from the four teams that advanced to the final of the men's team foil event received byes through round 1:

- France: Jacques Lefèvre, Jean Levavasseur, and Jean-François Tournon
- Italy: Gastone Darè, Renzo Nostini, and Vincenzo Pinton
- Hungary: Tibor Berczelly, Aladár Gerevich, and Pál Kovács
- United States: Joe de Capriles, Allan Kwartler, and George Worth

==== Pool 1 ====
Rank	Fencer	Nation	Wins	Losses	TS	TR	Notes
1	Hubert Loisel	Austria	6	1		20	Q
2	Leszek Suski	Poland	4	3		22	Q
3	Edgardo Pomini	Argentina	4	3		23	Q
4	Ion Santo	Romania	4	3		25	Q
5	Ivan Ruben	Denmark	3	4		25	
6	Umberto Menegalli	Switzerland	3	4		31	
7	Olaf Sandner	Venezuela	2	5		32	
8	Ivan Lund	Australia	2	5		33	

==== Pool 2 ====
Plattner defeated Molnar in a barrage for fourth place.

Rank	Fencer	Nation	Wins	Losses	TS	TR	Notes
1	Wojciech Zabłocki	Poland	6	1		20	Q
2	William Beatley	Great Britain	5	2		21	Q
3	Willy Fascher	Germany	5	2		25	Q
4	Werner Plattner	Austria	4	3		22	Q
5	Etienne Molnar	Brazil	4	3		23	
6	Karl Bach	Saar	2	5		32	
7	Jock Gibson	Australia	2	5		33	
8	João Pessanha	Portugal	0	7		35	

==== Pool 3 ====
Rank	Fencer	Nation	Wins	Losses	TS	TR	Notes
1	José D'Andrea	Argentina	5	1		21	Q
2	Heinz Lechner	Austria	4	2	27	19	Q
3	Antonio Haro	Mexico	4	2	25	19	Q
4	Adalbert Gurath Sr.	Romania	4	2		21	Q
5	Hans Esser	Germany	3	3		25	
6	Ahmed Abou-Shadi	Egypt	1	5		28	
7	Roland Asselin	Canada	0	6		30	

==== Pool 4 ====
Carnera defeated Rau in a barrage for fourth place.

Rank	Fencer	Nation	Wins	Losses	TS	TR	Notes
1	François Heywaert	Belgium	5	1		14	Q
1	Ivan Manayenko	Soviet Union	5	1		15	Q
1	Jerzy Pawłowski	Poland	5	1		22	Q
4	Raimondo Carnera	Denmark	3	4		26	Q
5	Ernst Rau	Saar	3	4		26	
6	John Fethers	Australia	2	6		28	
7	Rafael Cámara	Mexico	2	5		32	
8	Gustavo Gutiérrez	Venezuela	1	5		29	

==== Pool 5 ====
Rank	Fencer	Nation	Wins	Losses	TS	TR	Notes
1	Boris Belyakov	Soviet Union	4	1		17	Q
1	Gustave Ballister	Belgium	4	2		16	Q
3	Bob Anderson	Great Britain	4	2		20	Q
4	Daniel Sande	Argentina	3	3		26	Q
5	Benito Ramos	Mexico	2	4		23	
6	Alfred Eriksen	Norway	2	4		26	
7	José Ferreira	Portugal	1	4		24	

==== Pool 6 ====
Amez-Droz defeated Liebscher in a barrage for fourth place.

Rank	Fencer	Nation	Wins	Losses	TS	TR	Notes
1	Ilie Tudor	Romania	5	1		17	Q
1	Marcel Van Der Auwera	Belgium	5	2		18	Q
3	Henry Nordin	Sweden	5	2		23	Q
4	Jules Amez-Droz	Switzerland	4	3		25	Q
5	Richard Liebscher	Germany	4	3		26	
6	Günther Knödler	Saar	1	4		23	
6	Eduardo López	Guatemala	1	5		27	
6	Edmundo López	Venezuela	1	6		33	

==== Pool 7 ====
Abdel Rahman defeated Eriksson in a barrage for fourth place.

Rank	Fencer	Nation	Wins	Losses	TS	TR	Notes
1	Palle Frey	Denmark	6	0	30	12	Q
2	Otto Greter	Switzerland	5	2		22	Q
3	Lev Kuznetsov	Soviet Union	5	1		11	Q
4	Mohamed Abdel Rahman	Egypt	4	3		25	Q
5	Bo Eriksson	Sweden	4	3		25	
6	Álvaro Silva	Portugal	2	5		29	
7	Shinichi Maki	Japan	0	6		30	
7	Olgierd Porebski	Great Britain	0	6		30	

=== Quarterfinals ===
The top 4 finishers in each pool advanced to the semifinals.

==== Quarterfinal 1 ====
Rank	Fencer	Nation	Wins	Losses	TS	TR	Notes
1	Aladár Gerevich	Hungary	6	1		12	Q
2	Leszek Suski	Poland	5	2		20	Q
3	Ivan Manayenko	Soviet Union	5	2		22	Q
4	Renzo Nostini	Italy	4	3		24	Q
5	Palle Frey	Denmark	3	4		25	
6	Antonio Haro	Mexico	3	4		29	
7	José D'Andrea	Argentina	1	6		32	
8	Allan Kwartler	United States	1	6		34	

==== Quarterfinal 2 ====
Rank	Fencer	Nation	Wins	Losses	TS	TR	Notes
1	Pál Kovács	Hungary	6	0	30	14	Q
2	Werner Plattner	Austria	5	1			Q
3	Gustave Ballister	Belgium	4	3		22	Q
4	Adalbert Gurath Sr.	Romania	4	3		30	Q
5	George Worth	United States	3	4	28	27	
6	Lev Kuznetsov	Soviet Union	3	4	22	27	
7	Wojciech Zabłocki	Poland	2	5		30	
8	Edgardo Pomini	Argentina	0	7		35	

==== Quarterfinal 3 ====
Rank	Fencer	Nation	Wins	Losses	TS	TR	Notes
1	Tibor Berczelly	Hungary	5	2		20	Q
2	Heinz Lechner	Austria	5	2		21	Q
3	Ilie Tudor	Romania	5	2		23	Q
4	François Heywaert	Belgium	4	3		25	Q
5	Boris Belyakov	Soviet Union	3	4		26	
6	Jean-François Tournon	France	3	4		31	
7	Otto Greter	Switzerland	2	5		33	
8	Raimondo Carnera	Denmark	1	6		34	

==== Quarterfinal 4 ====
Rank	Fencer	Nation	Wins	Losses	TS	TR	Notes
1	Vincenzo Pinton	Italy	5	1		14	Q
2	Jean Levavasseur	France	5	1		15	Q
3	Joe de Capriles	United States	5	1		17	Q
4	Daniel Sande	Argentina	5	2		23	Q
5	Marcel Van Der Auwera	Belgium	3	3		22	
6	William Beatley	Great Britain	2	5		24	
7	Willy Fascher	Germany	0	6		30	
7	Ion Santo	Romania	0	6		30	

==== Quarterfinal 5 ====
Rank	Fencer	Nation	Wins	Losses	TS	TR	Notes
1	Jacques Lefèvre	France	5	0	25	1	Q
2	Hubert Loisel	Austria	4	1		17	Q
2	Gastone Darè	Italy	4	2		18	Q
2	Jerzy Pawłowski	Poland	4	2		21	Q
5	Mohamed Abdel Rahman	Egypt	2	4		26	
5	Henry Nordin	Sweden	2	4		26	
7	Bob Anderson	Great Britain	1	4		21	
8	Jules Amez-Droz	Switzerland	0	5		25	

=== Semifinals ===
The top 3 finishers in each pool advanced to the final. Renzo Nostini did not compete in the semifinals.

==== Semifinal 1 ====
Rank	Fencer	Nation	Wins	Losses	TS	TR	Notes
1	Gastone Darè	Italy	4	1		13	Q
1	Aladár Gerevich	Hungary	4	1		14	Q
1	Heinz Lechner	Austria	4	1		17	Q
4	Daniel Sande	Argentina	2	3		20	
4	Ivan Manayenko	Soviet Union	2	3		22	
4	Joe de Capriles	United States	2	4		24	
7	Ilie Tudor	Romania	0	5		25	

==== Semifinal 2 ====
Ballister defeated Loisel in a barrage for third place.

Rank	Fencer	Nation	Wins	Losses	TS	TR	Notes
1	Pál Kovács	Hungary	5	0	25	6	Q
2	Vincenzo Pinton	Italy	4	1		16	Q
3	Gustave Ballister	Belgium	2	3		21	Q
4	Hubert Loisel	Austria	2	3		20	
5	Jean Levavasseur	France	1	4		22	
6	Jerzy Pawłowski	Poland	1	4		24	

==== Semifinal 3 ====
Rank	Fencer	Nation	Wins	Losses	TS	TR	Notes
1	Jacques Lefèvre	France	4	1		12	Q
2	Werner Plattner	Austria	3	1		14	Q
3	Tibor Berczelly	Hungary	3	2		17	Q
4	Adalbert Gurath Sr.	Romania	2	3		18	
5	Leszek Suski	Poland	1	3		18	
6	François Heywaert	Belgium	1	4		22	

=== Final ===
Berczelly defeated Darè in a barrage for the bronze medal.

Rank	Fencer	Nation	Wins	Losses	TS	TR
1st place, gold medalist(s)	Pál Kovács	Hungary	8	0	40	19
2nd place, silver medalist(s)	Aladár Gerevich	Hungary	7	1		16
3rd place, bronze medalist(s)	Tibor Berczelly	Hungary	5	3		22
4	Gastone Darè	Italy	5	3		27
5	Werner Plattner	Austria	4	4		34
6	Jacques Lefèvre	France	3	5		25
7	Vincenzo Pinton	Italy	2	6		32
8	Heinz Lechner	Austria	2	6		35
9	Gustave Ballister	Belgium	0	8		40
