= Fencing at the 1952 Summer Olympics – Men's team sabre =

Men's team sabre at the Games of the XV Olympiad
- Venue: Westend Tennis Hall, Espoo
- Dates: 29 – 30 July 1952
- Competitors: 85 from 19 nations

Medalists
1st place, gold medalist(s)		Aladár Gerevich; Tibor Berczelly; Rudolf Kárpáti; Pál Kovács; László Rajcsányi; Bertalan Papp	Hungary
2nd place, silver medalist(s)		Vincenzo Pinton; Renzo Nostini; Gastone Darè; Mauro Racca; Roberto Ferrari; Giorgio Pellini	Italy
3rd place, bronze medalist(s)		Jacques Lefèvre; Jean Laroyenne; Maurice Piot; Jean Levavasseur; Bernard Morel; Jean-François Tournon	France

The men's team sabre was one of seven fencing events on the fencing at the 1952 Summer Olympics programme. It was the ninth appearance of the event. The competition was held from 29 July 1952, to 30 July 1952. 85 fencers from 19 nations competed.

== Competition format ==
The competition format continued the pool play round-robin from prior years. Each of the four fencers from one team would face each of the four from the other, for a total of 16 bouts per match. The team that won more bouts won the match, with competition potentially stopping when one team reached 9 points out of the possible 16 (this did not always occur and matches sometimes continued). If the bouts were 8–8, touches received was used to determine the winning team. Pool matches unnecessary to the result were not played.

== Results ==
=== Round 1 ===
The top two teams in each pool advanced to round 2.

==== Pool 1 ====
France (11–5) and Poland (8–8, 63–63 touches against, unclear how match was determined) each beat Romania. Poland led 6–1 over France when that match was abandoned.

Rank	Nation	MW	ML	BW	BL	Notes
1	Poland	2	0	14	9	Q
2	France	1	1	12	11	Q
3	Romania	0	2	13	19	

==== Pool 2 ====
Austria (13–3) and Italy (9–1) each beat Venezuela.

Rank	Nation	MW	ML	BW	BL	Notes
1	Austria	1	0	13	3	Q
2	Italy	1	0	9	1	Q
3	Venezuela	0	2	4	22	

==== Pool 3 ====
Denmark (12–4) and Egypt (9–1) each beat Australia.

Rank	Nation	MW	ML	BW	BL	Notes
1	Denmark	1	0	12	4	Q
2	Egypt	1	0	9	1	Q
3	Australia	0	2	5	21	

==== Pool 4 ====
Germany (9–7) and Belgium (9–2) each beat the Soviet Union.

Rank	Nation	MW	ML	BW	BL	Notes
1	Belgium	1	0	9	2	Q
2	Germany	1	0	9	7	Q
3	Soviet Union	0	2	9	18	

==== Pool 5 ====
Hungary defeated Portugal 15–1, Argentina defeated Saar 12–4, Hungary defeated Saar 15–1, and Argentina defeated Portugal 9–5.

Rank	Nation	MW	ML	BW	BL	Notes
1	Hungary	2	0	30	2	Q
2	Argentina	2	0	21	9	Q
3	Portugal	0	2	6	24	
4	Saar	0	2	5	27	

==== Pool 6 ====
Great Britain (11–5) and the United States (9–2) each beat Switzerland.

Rank	Nation	MW	ML	BW	BL	Notes
1	Great Britain	1	0	11	5	Q
2	United States	1	0	9	2	Q
3	Switzerland	0	2	7	20	

=== Round 2 ===
The top two teams in each pool advanced to the semifinals.

==== Pool 1 ====
Great Britain (9–7) and Italy (9–1) each beat Argentina.

Rank	Nation	MW	ML	BW	BL	Notes
1	Italy	1	0	9	1	Q
2	Great Britain	1	0	9	7	Q
3	Argentina	2	0	8	18	

==== Pool 2 ====
Austria (13–3) and Hungary (9–0) each beat Denmark.

Rank	Nation	MW	ML	BW	BL	Notes
1	Austria	1	0	13	3	Q
2	Hungary	1	0	9	0	Q
3	Denmark	0	2	3	22	

==== Pool 3 ====
The United States (11–5) and France (9–5) each beat Germany.

Rank	Nation	MW	ML	BW	BL	Notes
1	United States	1	0	11	5	Q
2	France	1	0	9	5	Q
3	Germany	0	2	10	20	

==== Pool 4 ====
Poland (9–7) and Belgium (9–2) each beat Egypt.

Rank	Nation	MW	ML	BW	BL	Notes
1	Belgium	1	0	9	2	Q
2	Poland	1	0	9	7	Q
3	Egypt	0	2	9	18	

=== Semifinals ===
The top two teams in each pool advanced to the final.

==== Semifinal 1 ====
In the first pairing, Hungary defeated France 13–3 and Austria beat Belgium 9–7. In the second set of matches, Hungary defeated Belgium 13–3 and France defeated Austria 10–6. In the first of the two final matches, Hungary defeated Austria 12–4 to secure first place in the group and eliminate Austria (who would come third regardless of the result between France and Belgium). Belgium (0–2, 10–22 in bouts) and France (1–1, 13–19 in bouts) faced off for the second advancement spot; Belgium would need to win by at least 10–6 to overcome France's advantage in bouts (the tie-breaker if France, Austria, and Belgium all finished at 1–2). When France took a 7th bout in the match after a 6–6 start, the French were guaranteed second place in the group even if Belgium were to win the final three bouts (and thus the match); those final three bouts were not played and France was declared the match victor 7–6.

Rank	Nation	MW	ML	BW	BL	Notes
1	Hungary	3	0	38	10	Q
2	France	2	1	20	25	Q
3	Austria	1	2	19	29	
4	Belgium	0	3	16	29	

==== Semifinal 2 ====
In the first pairing, Italy defeated Great Britain 11–5 and the United States beat Poland 10–6. In the second set of matches, the United States defeated Great Britain 9–5 and Italy defeated Poland 11–4. The two 2–0 teams advanced without playing each other; the two 0–2 teams likewise did not play each other.

Rank	Nation	MW	ML	BW	BL	Notes
1	Italy	2	0	22	9	Q
2	United States	2	0	19	11	Q
3	Great Britain	0	2	10	20	
4	Poland	0	2	10	21	

=== Final ===
In the first pairings, Hungary defeated France 13–3 and Italy beat the United States 12–4. The second set of matches featured Hungary defeating the United States and Italy beating France, each by a score of 13–3. This made the France vs. United States match a de facto bronze medal match, won by France 8–6. (The match was stopped at 8 wins because the United States trailed in touches against 60–48 and even if the Americans won by the final two bouts 5–0 apiece to even the bouts at 8–8, the French would win on touches against 60–58). The Hungary vs. Italy match was for the gold medal. Italy took a 7–6 lead, but Hungary won the next two bouts to go ahead 8–7. The final bout (between each team's top fencers, Kovács and Darè) never took place; Hungary's 64–50 touch lead was so great that even had Darè been able to beat Kovács 5–0 to draw the teams even on bouts 8–8 the Hungarians would nevertheless win the match.

Rank	Nation	MW	ML	BW	BL
1st place, gold medalist(s)	Hungary	3	0	34	13
2nd place, silver medalist(s)	Italy	2	1	32	15
3rd place, bronze medalist(s)	France	1	2	14	32
4	United States	0	3	13	33

== Rosters ==
Argentina

- Félix Galimi
- José D'Andrea
- Edgardo Pomini
- Daniel Sande
- Fulvio Galimi

Australia

- Charles Stanmore
- Jock Gibson
- John Fethers
- Ivan Lund

Austria

- Werner Plattner
- Heinz Putzl
- Hubert Loisel
- Heinz Lechner
- Paul Kerb

Belgium

- Marcel Van Der Auwera
- Gustave Ballister
- François Heywaert
- Robert Bayot
- Georges de Bourguignon
- Édouard Yves

Denmark

- Paul Theisen
- Raimondo Carnera
- Ivan Ruben
- Palle Frey
- Jakob Lyng

Egypt

- Mohamed Zulficar
- Mohamed Abdel Rahman
- Salah Dessouki
- Mahmoud Younes
- Ahmed Abou-Shadi

France

- Jacques Lefèvre
- Jean Laroyenne
- Maurice Piot
- Jean Levavasseur
- Bernard Morel
- Jean-François Tournon

Germany

- Siegfried Rossner
- Willy Fascher
- Hans Esser
- Richard Liebscher

Great Britain

- Roger Tredgold
- Olgierd Porebski
- Bob Anderson
- William Beatley
- Luke Wendon

Hungary

- Aladár Gerevich
- Tibor Berczelly
- Rudolf Kárpáti
- Pál Kovács
- László Rajcsányi
- Bertalan Papp

Italy

- Vincenzo Pinton
- Renzo Nostini
- Gastone Darè
- Mauro Racca
- Roberto Ferrari
- Giorgio Pellini

Poland

- Jerzy Twardokens
- Leszek Suski
- Jerzy Pawłowski
- Wojciech Zabłocki
- Zygmunt Pawlas

Portugal

- Álvaro Silva
- José Ferreira
- Augusto Barreto
- Jorge Franco
- João Pessanha

Romania

- Andrei Vîlcea
- Ion Santo
- Ilie Tudor
- Mihai Kokossy

Saar

- Karl Bach
- Willi Rössler
- Ernst Rau
- Günther Knödler
- Walter Brödel

Soviet Union

- Ivan Manayenko
- Mark Midler
- Vladimir Vyshpolsky
- Lev Kuznetsov
- Boris Belyakov

Switzerland

- Umberto Menegalli
- Oswald Zappelli
- Otto Greter
- Jules Amez-Droz

United States

- Norman Cohn-Armitage
- Joe de Capriles
- Tibor Nyilas
- Alex Treves
- George Worth
- Allan Kwartler

Venezuela

- Augusto Gutiérrez
- Olaf Sandner
- Gustavo Gutiérrez
- Edmundo López
