= France at the 1952 Summer Olympics =

- IOC code: FRA
- NOC: French Olympic Committee

in Helsinki
- Competitors: 245 (214 men and 31 women) in 18 sports
- Flag bearer: Ignace Heinrich
- Medals Ranked 7th: Gold 6 Silver 6 Bronze 6 Total 18

Summer Olympics appearances (overview)
- 1896; 1900; ~~1904~~; 1908; 1912; 1920; 1924; 1928; 1932; 1936; 1948; 1952; 1956; 1960; 1964; 1968; 1972; 1976; 1980; 1984; 1988; 1992; 1996; 2000; 2004; 2008; 2012; 2016; 2020; 2024; 2028

Other related appearances
- 1906 Intercalated Games

France competed at the 1952 Summer Olympics in Helsinki, Finland. 245 competitors, 214 men and 31 women, took part in 131 events in 18 sports.

== Medalists ==
=== Gold ===
- Jean Laudet and Georges Turlier — Canoeing, Men's C2 10.000m Canadian Pairs
- Pierre Jonquères d'Oriola — Equestrian, Jumping Individual
- Christian d'Oriola — Foil, Men's Individual
- Jehan Buhan, Christian d'Oriola, Jacques Lataste, Claude Netter, Jacques Noël, and Adrien Rommel — Fencing, Men's Foil Team
- Bernard Malivoire, Gaston Mercier, and Raymond Salles — Rowing, Men's Coxed Pairs
- Jean Boiteux — Swimming, Men's 400m Freestyle

=== Silver ===
- Alain Mimoun — Athletics, Men's 5.000 metres
- Alain Mimoun — Athletics, Men's 10.000 metres
- Madeleine Moreau — Diving, Women's Springboard
- Guy Lefrant — Equestrian, Three-Day Event Individual
- Pierre Blondiaux, Marc Bouissou, Roger Gautier, and Jean-Jacques Guissart — Rowing, Men's Coxless Fours
- Gilbert Bozon — Swimming, Men's 100m Backstroke

=== Bronze ===
- Joseph Ventaja — Boxing, Men's Featherweight
- Louis Gantois — Canoeing, Men's K1 1000m Kayak Singles
- Jacques Anquetil, Claude Rouer, Alfred Tonello and Roland Bezamat — Cycling, Men's Team Road Race
- André Jousseaume — Equestrian, Dressage Individual
- Jean Laroyenne, Jacques Lefèvre, Jean Levavasseur, Bernard Morel, Maurice Piot, and Jean-François Tournon — Fencing, Men's Sabre Team
- Joseph Bernardo, Jean Boiteux, Aldo Eminente, and Alexandre Jany — Swimming, Men's 4 × 200 m Freestyle Relay

== Basketball ==
Men's Team Competition

- Main Round (Group D)
  - Defeated Egypt (92-64)
  - Defeated Cuba (58-42)
  - Defeated Chile (52-43)
- Final Round (Group A)
  - Defeated Uruguay (58-56)
  - Lost to Argentina (52-61)
  - Lost to Bulgaria (58-67)
- Classification Matches
  - 5th/8th place: Lost to Brazil (44-59)
  - 7th/8th place: Lost to Bulgaria (44-58) → 8th place
- Team Roster
  - Roger Haudegand
  - Bernard Planque
  - Robert Monclar
  - René Chocat
  - Jean Perniceni
  - Louis Devoti
  - Robert Guillin
  - Robert Crost
  - Jacques Dessemme
  - André Buffière
  - André Vacheresse
  - Jean-Paul Beugnot

== Cycling ==
Road Competition

Men's Individual Road Race (190.4 km)

- Jacques Anquetil — 5:11:19.0 (→ 12th place)
- Alfred Tonello — 5:11:20.0 (→ 13th place)
- Claude Rouer — 5:16:19.1 (→ 23rd place)
- Roland Bezamat — did not finish (→ no ranking)

Track Competition

Men's 1.000m Time Trial

- Henri Andrieux
  - Final — 1:14.7 (→ 9th place)

Men's 1.000m Sprint Scratch Race

- Franck Le Normand — 11th place

Men's 4.000m Team Pursuit

- Claude Brugerolles, Henri Andrieux, Jean-Marie Joubert, and Pierre Michel
  - Bronze Medal Match — Lost to Great Britain (→ 4th place)

== Diving ==
Men

Athlete	Event	Preliminary		Final	
Athlete	Event	Points	Rank	Points	Rank
Henri Goosen	3 m springboard	57.79	30	Did not advance	
Raymond Mulinghausen	3 m springboard	59.52	26	Did not advance	
Raymond Mulinghausen	10 m platform	65.02	17	Did not advance	

Women

Athlete	Event	Preliminary		Final			
Athlete	Event	Points	Rank	Points	Rank	Total	Rank
Madeleine Moreau	3 m springboard	67.65	2 Q	71.69	3	139.34	2nd place, silver medalist(s)
Nicole Péllissard	3 m springboard	55.69	5 Q	56.29	7	111.98	7
Nicole Péllissard	10 m platform	43.59	4 Q	25.49	4	69.08	4

== Fencing ==
21 fencers, 18 men and 3 women, represented France in 1952.

Men's foil

- Christian d'Oriola
- Jacques Lataste
- Jéhan Buhan

Men's team foil

- Claude Netter, Jéhan Buhan, Jacques Lataste, Jacques Noël, Christian d'Oriola, Adrien Rommel

Men's épée

- René Bougnol
- Claude Nigon
- Armand Mouyal

Men's team épée

- Jean-Pierre Muller, Armand Mouyal, Daniel Dagallier, René Bougnol, Gérard Rousset, Claude Nigon

Men's sabre

- Jacques Lefèvre
- Jean Levavasseur
- Jean-François Tournon

Men's team sabre

- Jacques Lefèvre, Jean Laroyenne, Maurice Piot, Jean Levavasseur, Bernard Morel, Jean-François Tournon

Women's foil

- Renée Garilhe
- Lylian Lecomte-Guyonneau
- Odette Drand

== Modern pentathlon ==
Three male pentathletes represented France in 1952.

Individual

- André Lacroix
- Bertrand de Montaudoin
- Christian Palant

Team

- André Lacroix
- Bertrand de Montaudoin
- Christian Palant

== Rowing ==
France had 17 male rowers participate in six out of seven rowing events in 1952.

Men's single sculls

- Henri Butel

Men's double sculls

- Jacques Maillet
- Achille Giovannoni

Men's coxless pair

- Jean-Pierre Souche
- René Guissart

Men's coxed pair

- Raymond Salles
- Gaston Mercier
- Bernard Malivoire (cox)

Men's coxless four

- Pierre Blondiaux
- Jean-Jacques Guissart
- Marc Bouissou
- Roger Gautier

Men's coxed four

- André Goursolle
- Robert Texier
- Guy Nosbaum
- Claude Martin
- Didier Moureau (cox)

== Shooting ==
Nine shooters represented France in 1952.

25 m pistol

- Ludovic Heraud
- André Martin

50 m pistol

- André Martin
- Roger Tauvel

50 m rifle, three positions

- Jacques Mazoyer
- Paul Konsler

50 m rifle, prone

- Jacques Mazoyer
- Paul Konsler

100m running deer

- Jean-Albin Régis
- Albert Planchon

Trap

- André Taupin
- Claude Lagarde

== Swimming ==
Men

Ranks given are within the heat.

Athlete	Event	Heat		Semifinal		Swim-off		Final	
Athlete	Event	Time	Rank	Time	Rank	Time	Rank	Time	Rank
Aldo Eminente	100 m freestyle	58.2	2 Q	58.3	=3 QSO	58.8	2 Q	58.7	7
Alex Jany	100 m freestyle	58.9	=2 Q	58.9	4	—N/a		Did not advance	
Michel Vandamme	100 m freestyle	1:00.9	=3	Did not advance		—N/a		Did not advance	
Jo Bernardo	400 m freestyle	4:53.5	4 Q	4:56.0	6	—N/a		Did not advance	
Jean Boiteux	400 m freestyle	4:45.1	1 Q	4:33.1	1 Q	—N/a		4:30.7 OR	1st place, gold medalist(s)
René Million	400 m freestyle	5:07.0	5	Did not advance		—N/a		Did not advance	
Jo Bernardo	1500 m freestyle	19:06.5	2 Q	—N/a				18:59.1	5
Jean Boiteux	1500 m freestyle	19:12.3	1	—N/a				Did not advance	
Gilbert Bozon	100 m backstroke	1:07.8	1 Q	1:06.6	1 Q	—N/a		1:06.2	2nd place, silver medalist(s)
Lucien Zins	100 m backstroke	1:09.7	2 Q	1:10.5	8	—N/a		Did not advance	
Pierre Joly dit Dumesnil	200 m breaststroke	2:43.4	2	Did not advance		—N/a		Did not advance	
Maurice Lusien	200 m breaststroke	2:40.9	2 Q	2:39.1	5 Q	—N/a		2:39.8	7
Jo Bernardo; Aldo Eminente; Alex Jany; Jean Boiteux	4 × 200 m freestyle	8:55.9	1 Q	—N/a				8:45.9	3rd place, bronze medalist(s)

Women

Ranks given are within the heat.

Athlete	Event	Heat		Semifinal		Final	
Athlete	Event	Time	Rank	Time	Rank	Time	Rank
Josette Arène	100 m freestyle	1:09.1	3	Did not advance			
Gaby Tanguy	100 m freestyle	1:10.6	4	Did not advance			
Josette Arène	400 m freestyle	5:44.1	6	Did not advance			
Ginette Jany	400 m freestyle	5:32.6	5	Did not advance			
Colette Thomas	400 m freestyle	5:36.8	3	Did not advance			
Odette Lusien	200 m breaststroke	3:06.7	4	Did not advance			
Gaby Tanguy; Maryse Morandini; Ginette Jany; Josette Arène	4 × 100 m freestyle	4:42.0	4 Q	—N/a		4:44.1	8
