= Germany at the 1952 Summer Olympics =

- IOC code: GER
- NOC: National Olympic Committee for Germany

in Helsinki, Finland 19 July–3 August 1952
- Competitors: 205 (173 men and 32 women); Only athletes from West Germany in 18 sports
- Flag bearer: Friedel Schirmer
- Medals Ranked 28th: Gold 0 Silver 7 Bronze 17 Total 24

Summer Olympics appearances (overview)
- 1896; 1900; 1904; 1908; 1912; 1920–1924; 1928; 1932; 1936; 1948; 1952; 1956–1988; 1992; 1996; 2000; 2004; 2008; 2012; 2016; 2020; 2024

Other related appearances
- 1906 Intercalated Games –––– Saar (1952); United Team of Germany (1956–1964); East Germany (1968–1988); West Germany (1968–1988)

Germany competed at the 1952 Summer Olympics in Helsinki, Finland. 205 competitors, 173 men and 32 women, took part in 123 events in 18 sports.

Germany had not been invited to the 1948 Summer Olympics in London, Great Britain because of their role in World War II, and because their NOC restored in 1947 did not represent a recognized state yet, which was founded in 1949. Germany took part in the 1952 Winter Olympics, with the GDR declining to cooperate and form a United German team as required by the IOC, joining only in 1956 and later. On the other hand, the French-occupied Saar protectorate had to send a separate team, but could join for 1956. As a result, the team for the 1952 Summer Games was de facto representing West Germany.

This event marked the first time, and as of the 2024 Summer Olympics only time, Germany failed to win a gold medal in a Summer Olympics they competed in. As of the 2024 Summer Olympics, Germany's 24 medals is the highest number of total medals won at an Olympic Games without winning a gold medal.

== Medalists ==
Medal	Name	Sport	Event
Silver	Helga Klein; Ursula Knab; Marga Petersen; Maria Sander	Athletics	Women's 4 × 100 m Relay
Silver	Karl Storch	Athletics	Men's Hammer Throw
Silver	Marianne Werner	Athletics	Women's Shot Put
Silver	Edgar Basel	Boxing	Men's Flyweight
Silver	Otto Rothe; Klaus Wagner; Willi Büsing	Equestrian	Team Eventing
Silver	Alfred Schwarzmann	Gymnastics	Men's Horizontal Bar
Silver	Heinz Manchen; Helmut Heinhold; Helmut Noll	Rowing	Men's Coxed Pairs
Bronze	Heinz Ulzheimer	Athletics	Men's 800 m
Bronze	Maria Sander	Athletics	Women's 80 m Hurdles
Bronze	Herbert Schade	Athletics	Men's 5000 m
Bronze	Günther Steines; Hans Geister; Heinz Ulzheimer; Karl-Friedrich Haas	Athletics	Men's 4 × 400 m Relay
Bronze	Werner Lueg	Athletics	Men's 1500 m
Bronze	Günther Heidemann	Boxing	Men's Welterweight
Bronze	Michael Scheuer	Canoeing	Men's K-1 10000 m
Bronze	Egon Drews; Wilfried Soltau	Canoeing	Men's C-2 1000 m
Bronze	Egon Drews; Wilfried Soltau	Canoeing	Men's C-2 10000 m
Bronze	Edi Ziegler	Cycling	Men's Road Race
Bronze	Werner Potzernheim	Cycling	Men's Sprint
Bronze	Günther Haase	Diving	Men's 10 m Platform
Bronze	Heinz Pollay; Ida von Nagel; Fritz Thiedemann	Equestrian	Team Dressage
Bronze	Fritz Thiedemann	Equestrian	Individual Jumping
Bronze	Willi Büsing	Equestrian	Individual Eventing
Bronze	Theodor Thomsen; Erich Natusch; Georg Nowka	Sailing	Dragon Class
Bronze	Herbert Klein	Swimming	Men's 200 m Breaststroke

== Cycling ==
Road Competition

Men's Individual Road Race (190.4 km)

- Edi Ziegler — 5:07:47.5 (→ Bronze Medal)
- Oskar Zeissner — 5:11:18.5 (→ 8th place)
- Paul Maue — 5:24:44.5 (→ 48th place)
- Walter Becker — did not finish (→ no ranking)

Track Competition

Men's 1000 m Sprint Scratch Race

- Werner Potzernheim — Bronze Medal

== Diving ==
Men

Athlete	Event	Preliminary		Final			
Athlete	Event	Points	Rank	Points	Rank	Total	Rank
Hans Aderhold	3 m springboard	67.09	11	Did not advance			
Werner Sobeck	3 m springboard	66.75	12	Did not advance			
Fritz Geyer	10 m platform	69.64	10	Did not advance			
Günther Haase	10 m platform	75.41	3 Q	65.90	3	141.31	3rd place, bronze medalist(s)
Werner Sobeck	10 m platform	64.27	20	Did not advance			

== Fencing ==
Nine fencers, eight men and one woman, represented Germany in 1952.

Men's foil

- Norman Casmir
- Kurt Wahl
- Julius Eisenecker

Men's team foil

- Willy Fascher, Kurt Wahl, Norman Casmir, Julius Eisenecker, Siegfried Rossner

Men's épée

- Erwin Kroggel

Men's sabre

- Willy Fascher
- Hans Esser
- Richard Liebscher

Men's team sabre

- Siegfried Rossner, Willy Fascher, Hans Esser, Richard Liebscher

Women's foil

- Lilo Allgayer

== Modern pentathlon ==
Three male pentathletes represented Germany in 1952.

Individual

- Berthold Slupik
- Dietloff Kapp
- Adolf Harder

Team

- Berthold Slupik
- Dietloff Kapp
- Adolf Harder

== Rowing ==
Germany had 21 male rowers participate in five out of seven rowing events in 1952.

Men's double sculls

- Waldemar Beck
- Gerhard Füßmann

Men's coxless pair

- Heinz Renneberg
- Heinz Eichholz

Men's coxed pair

- Heinz Manchen
- Helmut Heinhold
- Helmut Noll (cox)

Men's coxed four

- Günter Twiesselmann
- Klaus Schulze
- Heinz Beyer
- Gerd Vogeley
- Hans Joachim Wiemken (cox)

Men's eight

- Anton Reinartz
- Michael Reinartz
- Roland Freihoff
- Heinz Zünkler
- Peter Betz
- Stefan Reinartz
- Hans Betz
- Toni Siebenhaar
- Hermann Zander (cox)

== Shooting ==
Six shooters represented Germany in 1952.

25 m pistol

- Ludwig Leupold
- Paul Wehner

50 m pistol

- Fritz Krempel

50 m rifle, three positions

- Erich Spörer
- Albert Sigl

50 m rifle, prone

- Erich Spörer
- Albert Sigl

Trap

- Kurt Schöbel

== Swimming ==
Men

Ranks given are within the heat.

Athlete	Event	Heat		Semifinal		Final	
Athlete	Event	Time	Rank	Time	Rank	Time	Rank
Heinz-Günther Lehmann	1500 m freestyle	19:17.9	2	—N/a		Did not advance	
Herbert Klein	200 m breaststroke	2:37.0	1 Q	2:37.0	1 Q	2:35.9	3rd place, bronze medalist(s)

Women

Ranks given are within the heat.

Athlete	Event	Heat		Semifinal		Final	
Athlete	Event	Time	Rank	Time	Rank	Time	Rank
Elisabeth Rechlin	100 m freestyle	1:08.5	3 Q	1:08.5	8	Did not advance	
Vera Schäferkordt	100 m freestyle	1:10.9	5	Did not advance			
Elisabeth Rechlin	400 m freestyle	5:38.0	4	Did not advance			
Erna Herbers	100 m backstroke	1:23.1	7	—N/a		Did not advance	
Gertrud Herrbruck	100 m backstroke	1:17.8	2 Q	—N/a		1:18.0	6
Ursula Happe	200 m breaststroke	3:02.7	2 Q	3:03.8	7	Did not advance	
Elisabeth Rechlin; Vera Schäferkordt; Kati Jansen; Gisela Jacob-Arendt; Vera Schäferkordt	4 × 100 m freestyle relay	4:42.7	4 Q	—N/a		4:40.3	7

== Wrestling ==
=== Men's flyweight ===
- Heini Weber

=== Men's bantamweight ===
- Ferdinand Schmitz

=== Men's featherweight ===
- Rolf Ellerbrock

=== Men's lightweight ===
- Heini Nettesheim

=== Men's welterweight ===
- Anton Mackowiak

=== Men's middleweight ===
- Gustav Gocke

=== Men's light-heavyweight ===
- Max Leichter

=== Men's heavyweight ===
- Willi Waltner
