= Liebscher =

Liebscher is a surname. Notable people with the surname include:

- Adolf Liebscher (1857–1919), Czech history painter
- Karel Liebscher (1851–1906), Czech landscape painter and illustrator
- Richard Liebscher (1910–date of death unknown), German fencer
- Tom Liebscher (born 1993), German Olympic canoeist
