= Schäferkordt =

Schäferkordt is a surname. Notable people with the surname include:

- Anke Schäferkordt (born 1962), German businessperson
- Vera Schäferkordt (1924–1987), German swimmer
