= Ursula Selle =

Venezuelan fencer

Úrsula Selle
Personal information
- Full name: Úrsula Margarita Selle Knauf-de Gómez
- Born: Úrsula Margarita Selle Knauf; 18 June 1933
- Died: 12 November 2021 (aged 88)

Sport
- Sport: Fencing
Medal record
Women's foil
Representing Venezuela
Central American and Caribbean Games
Gold medal – first place	1954 Mexico City	Women's foil
Bronze medal – third place	1962 Kingston	Team foil

Úrsula Margarita Selle Knauf-de Gómez (née Knauf; 18 June 1933 – 12 November 2021) was a Venezuelan fencer. She was selected to be part of the Venezuelan team at the 1952 Summer Olympics, becoming one of the first women to represent the nation at an Olympic Games. After the Summer Games, she competed in various editions of the Central American and Caribbean Games, winning a gold and bronze medal. She was honored in the Venezuelan Sports Hall of Fame.

== Biography ==
Úrsula Margarita Selle Knauf was born on 18 June 1933 to a father who was a German banker and bicycle merchant who emigrated to Venezuela. Growing up, her father took her to watch cycling races but was told that it was not a sport for women. She instead took up fencing.

For the 1952 Summer Olympics, Knauf was selected to be one of the two female fencers, the other being Gerda Muller, to represent Venezuela. With Muller, she was also one of the first women to compete for Venezuela at the Olympic Games. Knauf competed in the women's foil in the second pool on 26 July against six other fencers. She won two out of the six bouts she competed in, placing sixth and not advancing further to the second round. In an interview conducted in 2009, she stated: "Even though we were eliminated, the experience was wonderful and it was real Olympism, it was a sport of the heart."

After the 1952 Summer Games, she won the gold medal in the women's foil event at the 1954 Central American and Caribbean Games held in Mexico City, Mexico, and the bronze medal in the women's team foil event at the 1962 Central American and Caribbean Games held in Kingston, Jamaica. She also represented Venezuela at different editions of the Pan American Games. She remained in the Venezuelan fencing team until the 1970s.

Later on, she became a mother and was honored in the Venezuelan Sports Hall of Fame. Selle later died on 12 November 2021 at the age of 88.
