= Fascher =

Fascher is a surname. Notable people with the surname include:

- Horst Fascher (1936-2026), German music manager
- Marc Fascher (born 1968), German football manager and former player
- Willy Fascher (born 1912), German fencer
