= Saar at the 1952 Summer Olympics =

- Flag of the Saar protectorate
- IOC code: SAA
- NOC: National Olympic Committee of the Saarland

in Helsinki
- Competitors: 36 in 9 sports
- Medals: Gold 0 Silver 0 Bronze 0 Total 0

Summer Olympics appearances (overview)
- 1952

Other related appearances
- Germany (1896–1936, 1952, 1992–pres.); United Team of Germany (1956–1964); West Germany (1968–1988)

The National Olympic Committee (NOC) of the Saarland was founded in the spring of 1950 in the Saar Protectorate, which existed from 1947 to 1956, a region of western Germany that was occupied in 1945 by France. As a separate team, Saar took part in its sole Olympic Games at the 1952 Summer Olympics before being allowed to rejoin the German team in 1956. Thirty-six competitors, 31 men and five women, took part in 32 events in nine sports.

== Timeline of participation ==
Olympic Year/s	Team(s)	
1896–1912	German Empire	
1920–1924	denied participation after WWI	
1928–1932	Germany	
1936	Germany	
1948	occupied country after WWII: former German Olympic Committee was dissolved	
1952 W	Germany	
1952 S	Germany	
1952 S	Saar	East Germany did not participate
1956–1964	United Team of Germany (EUA)	
1968–1988	West Germany (FRG)	East Germany (GDR)
1992–present	Germany	

== History ==
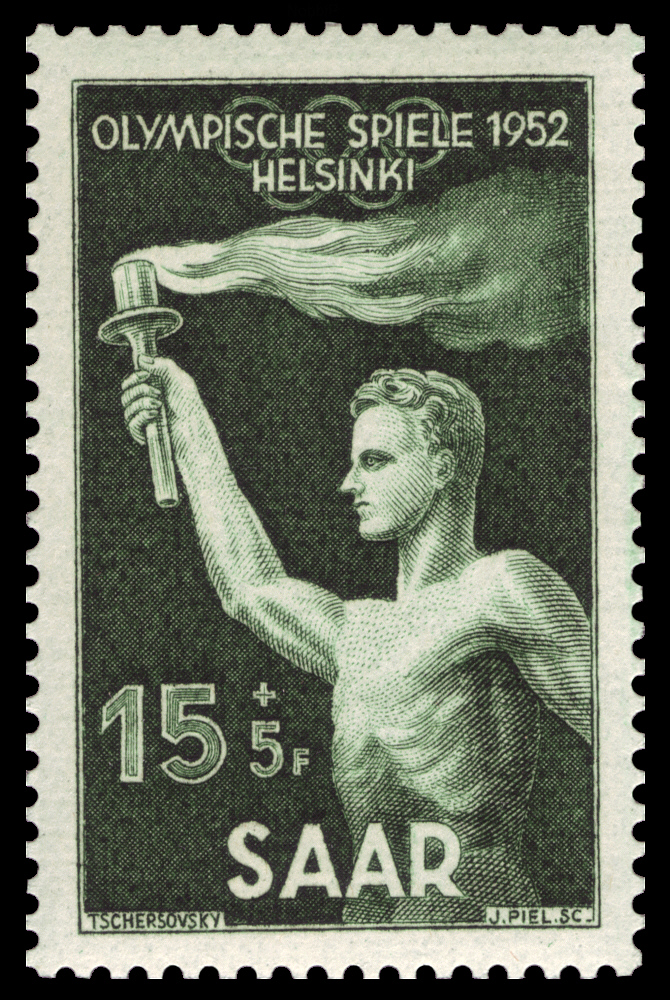
Saarland postage stamp marking the 1952 Olympics

Just as after World War I, Saarland had initially been disallowed from uniting with the Weimar Republic and remained under military occupation for several years after the end of the war. After World War II, the Saarland was not allowed to become part of the Federal Republic of Germany after its founding in May 1949. The annexation of Saar by France, however, was prohibited by the other Allies and Points 2 and 3 of the Atlantic Charter.

As the local population did not want to join France, separate international organizations were founded, including the Saarland football team, and in 1950 a NOC, in German called Nationales Olympisches Komitee des Saarlandes.

Saar was first eligible to send athletes to the 1952 Winter Olympics, but did not do so due to a lack of competitive athletes in winter sports. Having a recorded history of over 500 years of coal mining, the Saarland did donate a miner's safety lamp in which the flame of the torch relay of the 1952 Summer Olympics in Helsinki could be carried safely aboard airplanes.

At the opening ceremony of the 1952 Summer Olympics, 41 athletes from the Saarland marched. The team was listed in the official report with a total of 44 men and 6 women athletes and with 71 competitors, 16 officials, 11 spectators for a total of 98. The team won no medals and was ranked a joint 44th among a total of 69 teams.

Following a referendum in October 1955 that overwhelmingly rejected the Saar statute proposing Saar independence as a "European territory", the people of Saar indirectly voted in favor of accession to the Federal Republic of Germany. The subsequent Saar Treaty of October 1956 allowed the Saarland to rejoin Germany effective as of 1 January 1957.

No separate Saarland teams were sent to the 1956 Olympic Games, as a United Team of Germany comprising athletes of all three German states took part for the first and only time. The Olympic Committee of the Saarland formally dissolved in February 1957 as its members, like other separate institutions of the Saarland, became part of their German counterparts.

=== Notable competitors ===
Therese Zenz (born 15 October 1932 in Merzig), a local champion, finished 9th in the canoe race at the 1952 Olympics, held on the open Baltic Sea, a new experience for the 19-year-old athlete from a landlocked country. She became world champion in 1954 in the K-1 500 m event. Competing for Germany in 1956, Zenz won a silver medal and won an additional two silvers in 1960. Zenz went on to coach gold medalists Roswitha Esser and Annemarie Zimmermann at the 1964 Olympics.

== Medal tables ==
=== Medals by Games ===
Games	Gold	Silver	Bronze	Total
1952 Helsinki	0	0	0	0
Total	0	0	0	0

== Athletics ==
Men
Field events

Athlete	Event	Qualification		Final	
Athlete	Event	Distance	Position	Distance	Position
Toni Breder	Long jump	6.88	19	did not advance	
Willi Burgard	Triple jump	13.86	29	did not advance	

Women
Track & road events

Athlete	Event	Heat		Quarterfinal		Semifinal		Final	
Athlete	Event	Result	Rank	Result	Rank	Result	Rank	Result	Rank
Hilda Antes	80 m hurdles	12.0	4	did not advance					
Hilda Antes; Inge Eckel; Ursel Finger; Inge Glashörster	4 × 100 m relay	49.0	5	did not advance					

Field events

Athlete	Event	Qualification		Final	
Athlete	Event	Distance	Position	Distance	Position
Ursel Finger	Long jump	5.27	25	did not advance	

== Boxing ==
Men

Athlete	Event	1 Round	2 Round	Quarterfinals	Semifinals	Final	
Athlete	Event	Opposition Result	Opposition Result	Opposition Result	Opposition Result	Opposition Result	Rank
Helmut Hofmann	Flyweight	Han Soo-An (KOR); L TKO 1R	did not advance				
Kurt Schirra	Featherweight	Luis Aranguren (VEN); W 2:1	János Erdei (HUN); L 0:3	did not advance			
Willi Rammo	Light Middleweight	Josef Hamberger (AUT); L 0:3	did not advance				

== Canoeing ==
Men

Athlete	Event	Heats		Final	
Athlete	Event	Time	Rank	Time	Rank
Heinrich Heß; Kurt Zimmer	K-2 1000 m	4:01.4	4	did not advance	
Heinrich Heß; Kurt Zimmer	K-2 10000 m	—N/a		48:05.6	12

Women

Athlete	Event	Heats		Final	
Athlete	Event	Time	Rank	Time	Rank
Therese Zenz	K-1 500 m	2:26.9	3 Q	2:27.9	9

== Fencing ==
Five fencers, all men, represented Saar in 1952.

Men's foil

- Karl Bach
- Ernst Rau
- Günther Knödler

Men's team foil

- Ernst Rau, Walter Brödel, Karl Bach, Günther Knödler

Men's sabre

- Ernst Rau
- Karl Bach
- Günther Knödler

Men's team sabre

- Karl Bach, Willi Rössler, Ernst Rau, Günther Knödler, Walter Brödel

== Rowing ==
Saar had seven male rowers participate in three out of seven rowing events in 1952.

Men

Athlete	Event	Heats		Repechage		Semifinal		Repechage		Final	
Athlete	Event	Time	Rank	Time	Rank	Time	Rank	Time	Rank	Time	Rank
Günther Schütt	Single sculls	7:58.4	3 R	7:38.4	1 Q	BYE		7:42.9	2	did not advance	
Klaus Hahn; Herbert Kesel	Coxless pair	8:09.5	3 R	DNF		did not advance					
Werner Biel; Hans Krause-Wichmann; Achim Krause-Wichmann; Hanns Peters	Coxless four	6:40.8	1 Q	BYE		7:10.4	3 R	6:47.2	2	did not advance	

== Shooting ==
Two shooters represented Saar in 1952.

Men

Athlete	Event	Final	
Athlete	Event	Score	Rank
Hans Eschenbrenner	50 m rifle, prone	384	52
Ludwig Gräf	50 m rifle, three positions	1089	38
Ludwig Gräf	50 m rifle, prone	391	40

== Swimming ==
Men

Rank given is within the heat.

Athlete	Event	Heat		Semifinal		Final	
Athlete	Event	Time	Rank	Time	Rank	Time	Rank
Georg Mascetti	400 metre freestyle	5:31.2	7	did not advance			

== Wrestling ==
Men's Greco-Roman

Athlete	Event	Elimination pool					Final round	
Athlete	Event	Round 1 Result	Round 2 Result	Round 3 Result	Round 4 Result	Round 5 Result	Final round Result	Rank
Werner Zimmer	−52 kg	Heini Weber (GER); L F 3:29	Leo Honkala (FIN); L F 6:41	did not advance				14
Norbert Kohler	−57 kg	Oswaldo Johnston (GUA); W F 7:05	Ferdinand Schmitz (GER); L F 2:55	Hubert Persson (SWE); L 0–3	did not advance			10
Erich Schmidt	−67 kg	Kamal Hussain (EGY); L 0–3	Georgios Petmezas (GRE); W 2–1	Jan Cools (BEL); W 3–0	did not advance			10
