= Odescalchi (disambiguation) =

Odescalchi is a surname of Italian origin. It may refer to:

- Erba-Odescalchi, Italian noble family of princely rank
- Castello Orsini-Odescalchi, in Bracciano, in the Province of Rome, Lazio, Italy
- Benedetto Odescalchi (1611-1689), the future pope Innocent XI
- Benedetto II Erba Odescalchi (1679–1740), Italian Cardinal and Roman Catholic Archbishop of Milan
- Carlo Odescalchi (1785–1841), Italian prince and priest, archbishop of Ferrara, cardinal
- Livio Odescalchi (17th century), Italian nobleman, Duke of Bracciano, Ceri and Sirmium
- Ladislao Odescalchi (1920–2000), Italian sports shooter
- Paolo Odescalchi (died 1585), Italian Roman Catholic Bishop of Penne e Atri (1568–1572), and Apostolic Nuncio to Naples
- Giulio Maria Odescalchi (1612–1666), Italian Roman Catholic Bishop of Novara
