= John H. Larsen Jr. =

Norwegian sports shooter (born 1943)

Personal information
- Born: 18 August 1943 (age 82) Oslo, Norway

Sport
- Sport: Sports shooting

John H. Larsen Jr. (born 18 August 1943) is a Norwegian former sports shooter. He competed in the 50 metre running target event at the 1972 Summer Olympics. His father, John Larsen, also represented Norway at the Olympics in the shooting competition.
