= Shooting at the 1952 Summer Olympics – Men's 100 meter running deer, single and double shot =

Men's 100 meter running deer, single and double shot at the Games of the XV Olympiad
- Venue: Helsinki, Finland
- Date: 28–29 July 1952
- Competitors: 14 from 7 nations

Medalists
1st place, gold medalist(s)		John Larsen	Norway
2nd place, silver medalist(s)		Per Olof Sköldberg	Sweden
3rd place, bronze medalist(s)		Tauno Mäki	Finland

The Men's 100 meter running deer, single and double shot event was a shooting sports event held as part of the Shooting at the 1952 Summer Olympics programme. It was the first appearance of the event. The competition was held on 28 and 29 July 1952 at the shooting ranges in Helsinki. 14 shooters from 7 nations competed.

== Medalists ==
Gold	Silver	Bronze
John Larsen (NOR)	Per Olof Sköldberg (SWE)	Tauno Mäki (FIN)

== Results ==
Place	Shooter	Total
1	John Larsen (NOR)	413
2	Per Olof Sköldberg (SWE)	409
3	Tauno Mäki (FIN)	407
4	Rolf Bergersen (NOR)	399
5	Thorleif Kockgård (SWE)	397
6	Yrjö Miettinen (FIN)	392
7	Pyotr Nikolayev (URS)	385
8	Vladimir Sevryugin (URS)	383
9	Jean-Albin Régis (FRA)	352
10	Albert Planchon (FRA)	350
11	Cyril Mackworth-Praed (GBR)	321
12	Ingram Capper (GBR)	319
13	Luigi Ruspoli (ITA)	154
14	Ladislao Odescalchi (ITA)	152
