= Hilda Antes =

German sprinter

Personal information
- Nationality: German
- Born: 12 June 1929
- Died: 12 January 2016 (aged 86)

Sport
- Sport: Sprinting
- Event: 4 × 100 metres relay

Hilda Antes (12 June 1929 – 12 January 2016) was a German sprinter. She competed in the women's 4 × 100 metres relay and women's 80 metres hurdles at the 1952 Summer Olympics representing Saar.

== See also ==
- Saar at the 1952 Summer Olympics
