= Luigi Ruspoli =

Italian sport shooter

Personal information
- Born: 14 March 1908 Rome, Italy
- Died: 20 July 1992 (aged 84)

Sport
- Sport: Sports shooting

Luigi Ruspoli (14 March 1908 – 20 July 1992) was an Italian sports shooter. He competed in the 100 m running deer event at the 1952 Summer Olympics.
