= Pyotr Nikolayev =

Soviet sports shooter

Personal information
- Born: 18 April 1924 Irkutsk, Soviet Union
- Died: 2000 (aged 75–76)

Sport
- Sport: Sports shooting

Pyotr Nikolayev (18 April 1924 – 2000) was a Soviet sports shooter. He competed in the 100 m running deer event at the 1952 Summer Olympics.

== Personal life ==
Nikolayev served in the Soviet Army as a squad leader during the Second World War. He was awarded the Medal "For Courage" and Medal "For the Victory over Germany in the Great Patriotic War 1941–1945".
