= Tibor Berczelly =

Hungarian fencer (1912–1990)

Personal information
- Born: 3 January 1912 Budapest, Austria-Hungary
- Died: 15 October 1990 (aged 78) Budapest, Hungary

Sport
- Sport: Fencing
Medal record
Men's fencing
Representing Hungary
Olympic Games
Gold medal – first place	1936 Berlin	Sabre, team
Gold medal – first place	1948 London	Sabre, team
Gold medal – first place	1952 Helsinki	Sabre, team
Bronze medal – third place	1952 Helsinki	Foil, team
Bronze medal – third place	1952 Helsinki	Sabre, individual

Tibor Berczelly (3 January 1912 – 15 October 1990) was a Hungarian sabre and foil fencer. He won three gold and two bronze medals at three Olympic Games.
