= Ursel Finger =

German sprinter

Personal information
- Nationality: German
- Born: 5 July 1929
- Died: 22 February 2015 (aged 85)

Sport
- Sport: Sprinting
- Event: 4 × 100 metres relay

Ursula Elizabeth Finger-Morrison (5 July 1929 – 22 February 2015) was a German sprinter. Born in Saarbrücken, she competed in the women's 4 × 100 metres relay at the 1952 Summer Olympics representing Saar. She was the first woman to represent Saar at the Olympics.

== See also ==
- Saar at the 1952 Summer Olympics
