= Olof Sköldberg =

Swedish sport shooter

Per Olof Sköldberg
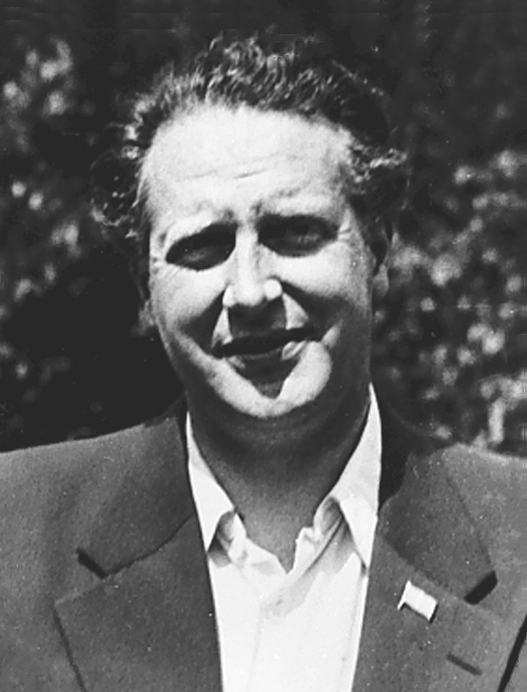

Personal information
- Born: 19 January 1910 Kristinehamn, Sweden
- Died: 16 July 1979 (aged 69) Stockholm, Sweden

Sport
- Sport: Sports shooting
Medal record
Representing Sweden
Olympic Games
Silver medal – second place	1952 Helsinki	100 m running deer
Silver medal – second place	1956 Melbourne	100 m running deer

Per Olof Sköldberg (19 January 1910 – 16 July 1979) was a Swedish sport shooter. He won a silver medal in running deer at the 1952 Summer Olympics in Helsinki, and a silver medal at the 1956 Summer Olympics in Melbourne.

Sköldberg also won four world titles, in 1937 and 1947, in deer single and double shot events, team and individual.
