= Tauno Mäki =

Finnish sport shooter

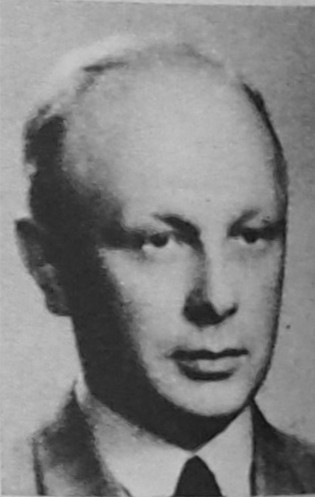
- Mäki in 1961

Personal information
- Born: 6 February 1912 Karinainen, Finland
- Died: 7 October 1983 (aged 71) Helsinki, Finland

Sport
- Sport: Sports shooting
Medal record
Men's shooting
Representing Finland
Olympic Games
Bronze medal – third place	1952 Helsinki	100 m running deer

Tauno Mäki (6 February 1912 – 7 October 1983) was a Finnish sport shooter. He was born in Karinainen, Pöytyä. He won a bronze medal in 100 metre running deer at the 1952 Summer Olympics in Helsinki.
