= Muhammad Ali (Pakistani boxer) =

Pakistani boxer (born 1933)

Personal information
- Nationality: Pakistani
- Born: 19 June 1933 (age 91)

Sport
- Sport: Boxing

Muhammad Ali (born 19 June 1933) is a Pakistani boxer. He competed in the men's lightweight event at the 1952 Summer Olympics. At the 1952 Summer Olympics, he lost to Vicente Matute of Venezuela.
