= Yrjö Miettinen =

Finnish sport shooter

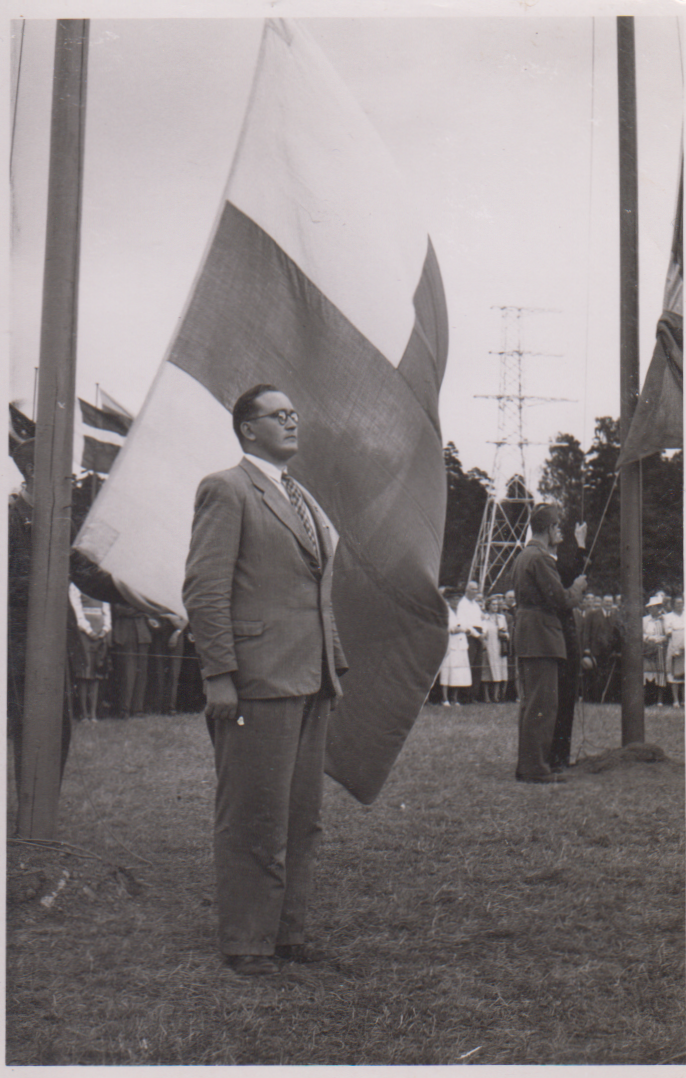

Personal information
- Born: 8 May 1913 Lapinlahti, Finland
- Died: 17 May 1969 (aged 56) Tampere, Finland

Sport
- Sport: Sports shooting

Yrjö Miettinen (8 May 1913 – 17 May 1969) was a Finnish sports shooter. He competed in the 100 m running deer event at the 1952 Summer Olympics.
