= John Larsen (sport shooter, born 1913) =

Norwegian rifle shooter (1913–1989)

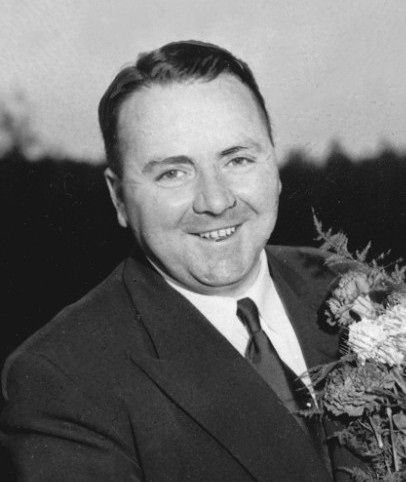
- John Larsen in 1952

Personal information
- Born: 27 August 1913 Østre Aker, Oslo, Norway
- Died: 5 August 1989 (aged 75) Oslo, Norway

Sport
- Sport: Sports shooting
- Event(s): Rifle, 100 metre running deer
- Club: Oslo Sportsskyttere
Medal record
Representing Norway
Olympic Games
Gold medal – first place	1952 Helsinki	100 m running deer
ISSF World Shooting Championships
Gold medal – first place	1949 Buenos Aires	100 m running deer, single shot
Gold medal – first place	1949 Buenos Aires	100 m running deer, single + double shot
Gold medal – first place	1949 Buenos Aires	100 m running deer, team single + double shot
Gold medal – first place	1952 Oslo	100 m running deer, single shot
Gold medal – first place	1952 Oslo	100 m running deer, double shot
Gold medal – first place	1952 Oslo	100 m running deer, team single shot
Gold medal – first place	1952 Oslo	100 m running deer, team double shot
Silver medal – second place	1954 Caracas	100 m running deer, team single shot
Bronze medal – third place	1954 Caracas	100 m running deer, team double shot

John Harry Larsen (27 August 1913 – 5 August 1989) was a Norwegian rifle shooter who competed in the 100 metre running deer event at the 1952 and 1956 Olympics. He won a gold medal in 1952 and placed eighth in 1956. At the 1952 Olympics he used a custom M95M Trombone Conversion in 6.5×55mm of which there were only 3 made. Larsen won seven gold medals at the ISSF World Shooting Championships in 1949–1954. His son, John H. Larsen, Jr., also became an Olympic rifle shooter.
