= Walter Brödel =

German fencer

Personal information
- Full name: Walter Emil Brödel
- Born: 19 December 1925 Saarbrücken, Germany
- Died: 3 May 1989 (aged 63) Saarbrücken, Germany

Sport
- Sport: Fencing

Walter Emil Brödel (19 December 1925 – 3 May 1989) was a German fencer who competed for Saar at the 1952 Summer Olympics. He fenced in the team foil and sabre events. He committed suicide in 1989.

== See also ==
- Saar at the 1952 Summer Olympics
