= Herman Barreto =

Venezuelan sports shooter (1926–1966)

Personal information
- Full name: Hernán Barreto Avellaneda
- Born: 11 November 1926 Caracas, Venezuela
- Died: 8 August 1966 (aged 39) Caracas, Venezuela

Sport
- Sport: Sports shooting

Hernán Barreto Avellaneda (11 November 1926 – 8 August 1966) was a Venezuelan sports shooter. He competed in the 25 m pistol event at the 1952 Summer Olympics. Barreto died in Caracas on 8 August 1966, at the age of 39.
