= Juan Kavanagh =

Venezuelan fencer

Personal information
- Born: John Arthur Kavanagh Illaramendi; 12 September 1931 New York, U.S.
- Died: 2 July 1992 (aged 60) Caracas, Venezuela

Sport
- Sport: Fencing

Juan Kavanagh (12 September 1931 – 2 July 1992) was a Venezuelan fencer. He competed in the individual and team foil events at the 1952 Summer Olympics.
