= Jean Laroyenne =

French fencer (1930–2009)

Personal information
- Born: 6 March 1930 Lyon, France
- Died: 13 February 2009 (aged 78)

Sport
- Sport: Fencing
Medal record
Men's fencing
Representing France
Olympic Games
Bronze medal – third place	1952 Helsinki	Sabre, team

Jean Laroyenne (6 March 1930 – 13 February 2009) was a French fencer. He won a bronze medal in the team sabre event at the 1952 Summer Olympics.
