= Ladislao Odescalchi =

Italian sports shooter

Personal information
- Born: 22 January 1920 Rome, Italy
- Died: 16 April 2000 (aged 80) Monte Carlo, Monaco

Sport
- Sport: Sports shooting

Ladislao Odescalchi (22 January 1920 – 16 January 2000) was an Italian sports shooter. He competed in the 100 m running deer event at the 1952 Summer Olympics.
