= Willi Rössler =

German fencer

Personal information
- Born: 24 February 1924
- Died: 2 October 2007 (aged 83)

Sport
- Sport: Fencing

Willi Kurt Rössler (12 February 1924 – 2 October 2007) was a German fencer who competed for Saar at the 1952 Summer Olympics. He fenced in the team sabre event.

== See also ==
- Saar at the 1952 Summer Olympics
