= Rigoberto Rivero =

Venezuelan sports shooter (born 1914)

Personal information
- Born: 25 April 1914
- Died: 6 September 1970 (aged 56)

Sport
- Sport: Sports shooting

Rigoberto Rivero (25 April 1914 – 6 September 1970) was a Venezuelan sports shooter. He competed in the 300 m rifle, three positions event at the 1952 Summer Olympics.
