= Hector de Lima Polanco =

Venezuelan sports shooter

Personal information
- Born: 24 March 1911

Sport
- Sport: Sports shooting

Hector de Lima Polanco (born 24 March 1911, date of death unknown) was a Venezuelan sports shooter. He competed at the 1952 Summer Olympics and 1956 Summer Olympics.
