= Andoni Ituarte =

Venezuelan cyclist

Personal information
- Born: 20 August 1919 Bilbao, Spain
- Died: between 2003 and 2013

Cycling career
- Sport: Cycling

Andoni Ituarte (born 20 August 1919, died between 2003 and 2013) was a Venezuelan cyclist. He competed in two events at the 1952 Summer Olympics.
