= Jean-Albin Régis =

French sports shooter

Personal information
- Born: 19 February 1912 Capdenac-Gare, France
- Died: 12 December 1981 (aged 69) Bordeaux, France

Sport
- Sport: Sports shooting

Jean-Albin Emile Régis (19 February 1912 – 12 December 1981) was a French sports shooter. He competed in the 100 m running deer event at the 1952 Summer Olympics.
