= Danilo Heredia =

Venezuelan cyclist (born 1926)

Personal information
- Full name: Alberto Danilo Heredia Mijares
- Born: 26 September 1926

Cycling career
- Sport: Cycling

Danilo Heredia (born 26 September 1926) is a Venezuelan former cyclist. He competed in the 4,000 metres team pursuit at the 1952 Summer Olympics.
