= Ramón Echegaray =

Personal information
- Born: 1 April 1935 (age 91)

Cycling career
- Sport: Cycling

Ramón Echegaray (born 1 April 1935) is a Venezuelan cyclist. He competed in the 4,000 metres team pursuit at the 1952 Summer Olympics.
