= Sergio Gascue =

Venezuelan boxer

Personal information
- Nationality: Venezuelan
- Born: 7 October 1932
- Died: 1979 (aged 46–47)

Sport
- Sport: Boxing

Sergio Gascue (7 October 1932 – 1979) was a Venezuelan boxer. He competed in the men's welterweight event at the 1952 Summer Olympics.
