= Juan Camous =

Venezuelan fencer (1929–2003)

Personal information
- Born: 1929 Nice, France
- Died: 2003 (aged 73–74)

Sport
- Sport: Fencing

Juan Camous (1929 – 2003) was a Venezuelan fencer. He competed in the individual and team épée events at the 1952 Summer Olympics.
