= André Martin (sport shooter) =

French sports shooter (1908–1991)

Personal information
- Born: 15 July 1908 Issenheim, France
- Died: 2 July 1991 (aged 82) Bordeaux, France

Sport
- Sport: Sports shooting

André Martin (15 July 1908 – 2 July 1991) was a French sport shooter. He competed in two events at the 1952 Summer Olympics.
