= Carlos Marrero =

Venezuelan sports shooter (born 1914)

Personal information
- Born: 1 October 1914

Sport
- Sport: Sports shooting

Carlos Alberto Marrero Cabrera (born 1 October 1914, date of death unknown) was a Venezuelan sports shooter. He competed in the 50 m pistol event at the 1952 Summer Olympics.
