= Albert Planchon =

French sports shooter

Personal information
- Born: 2 March 1905 Paris, France
- Died: 27 July 1989 (aged 84) Châteaudun, France

Sport
- Sport: Sports shooting

Albert Planchon (2 March 1905 – 27 July 1989) was a French sports shooter. He competed in the 100 m running deer event at the 1952 Summer Olympics.
