= Henri Andrieux =

French cyclist (1931–2008)

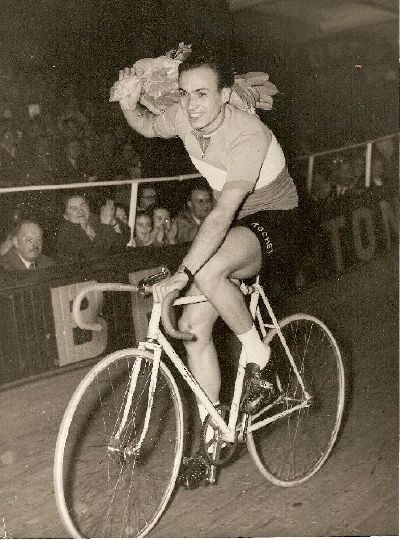

Personal information
- Born: 23 September 1931 Paris, France
- Died: 2 January 2008 (aged 76) Villejuif, France

Cycling career
- Sport: Cycling

Henri Andrieux (23 September 1931 – 2 January 2008) was a French cyclist. He competed in two events at the 1952 Summer Olympics in Helsinki, Finland. He came in 4th in the team pursuit and 9th in the men's km time trial.
