= Mihai Kokossy =

Romanian fencer

Personal information
- Born: 9 April 1911 Siménfalva, Austria-Hungary
- Died: 1986 (aged 74–75)

Sport
- Sport: Fencing

Mihai Kokossy (9 April 1911 – 1986) was a Romanian fencer. He competed in the team sabre event at the 1952 Summer Olympics.
