= Oscar Saiz =

Venezuelan swimmer

Personal information
- Born: 15 January 1933 (age 93)

Sport
- Sport: Swimming

Oscar Saiz (born 15 January 1933) is a Venezuelan former swimmer. He competed in the men's 100 metre freestyle at the 1952 Summer Olympics.
