= Maurice Piot =

French fencer (1912–1996)

Personal information
- Born: 14 July 1912 Saint-Quentin, Aisne, France
- Died: 22 May 1996 (aged 83) Paris, France

Sport
- Sport: Fencing
Medal record
Men's fencing
Representing France
Olympic Games
Bronze medal – third place	1952 Helsinki	Sabre, team

Maurice Piot (14 July 1912 – 22 May 1996) was a French fencer. He won a bronze medal in the team sabre event at the 1952 Summer Olympics.
