= Bernard Morel (fencer) =

French fencer (1925–2023)

Personal information
- Born: 30 March 1925 Lyon, France
- Died: 23 October 2023 (aged 98) Roanne, France

Sport
- Sport: Fencing
Medal record
Men's fencing
Representing France
Olympic Games
Bronze medal – third place	1952 Helsinki	Sabre, team
Mediterranean Games
Bronze medal – third place	1951 Alexandria	Team sabre

Bernard Morel (30 March 1925 – 23 October 2023) was a French fencer. He won a bronze medal in the team sabre event at the 1952 Summer Olympics. He also competed at the 1951 Mediterranean Games where he won a bronze medal in the team sabre event.

Morel died in Roanne on 23 October 2023, at the age of 98.
