= Jacques Lefèvre (fencer) =

French fencer (1928–2024)

Personal information
- Full name: Jacques Édmond Émile Lefèvre
- Born: 1 February 1928 Marseille, France
- Died: 12 January 2024 (aged 95) La Rochelle, France

Sport
- Sport: Fencing
Medal record
Men's fencing
Representing France
Olympic Games
| Bronze medal – third place | 1952 Helsinki | Sabre, team |
Mediterranean Games
| Gold medal – first place | 1951 Alexandria | Individual sabre |
| Gold medal – first place | 1955 Barcelona | Individual sabre |
| Silver medal – second place | 1955 Barcelona | Team sabre |
| Bronze medal – third place | 1951 Alexandria | Team sabre |

Jacques Lefèvre (1 February 1928 – 12 January 2024) was a French fencer. At the 1952 Summer Olympics, Lefèvre won a team bronze medal for fencing, as a member of the French Men's Sabre team. He competed for France in the individual and team sabre events at each Summer Olympics from 1948 to 1964. He also competed at the Mediterranean Games in 1951, where he won a gold medal in the individual sabre event and a bronze medal in the team sabre event, and in 1955, where he won a gold medal in the individual sabre event and a silver medal in the team event. Lefèvre died in La Rochelle on 12 January 2024, at the age of 95.

== See also ==
- List of athletes with the most appearances at Olympic Games
