= Siegfried Rossner =

German fencer

Personal information
- Born: 17 May 1914 Berlin, German Empire
- Died: 25 June 1996 (aged 82) Bad Pyrmont, Germany

Sport
- Sport: Fencing

Siegfried Rossner (17 May 1914 – 25 June 1996) was a German fencer. He competed in the team foil and sabre events at the 1952 Summer Olympics.
