= João Pessanha =

Portuguese fencer (born 1918)

Personal information
- Full name: João de Gouveia Pessanha
- Born: 8 April 1918

Sport
- Sport: Fencing

João Pessanha (born 8 April 1918, date of death unknown) was a Portuguese fencer. He competed in the individual and team sabre events at the 1952 Summer Olympics. Pessanha is deceased.
