= Henry Nordin =

Swedish fencer

Personal information
- Born: 8 December 1921 Högseröd, Eslöv Municipality, Sweden
- Died: 8 September 2018 (aged 96) Malmö, Sweden

Sport
- Sport: Fencing

Henry Nordin (8 December 1921 – 8 September 2018) was a Swedish fencer. He competed in the individual sabre event at the 1952 Summer Olympics.

== Awards ==
- (Sweden) Swedish Fencing Federation Royal Medal of Merit in gold (Svenska fäktförbundets kungliga förtjänstmedalj i guld) (1996)
