= Daniel Sande =

Argentine fencer (born 1916)

Personal information
- Born: 25 August 1916 Buenos Aires, Argentina

Sport
- Sport: Fencing

Daniel Sande (born 25 August 1916, date of death unknown) was an Argentine fencer. He competed at the 1948, 1952 and 1960 Summer Olympics. Sande is deceased.
