= Jean-François Tournon =

French fencer

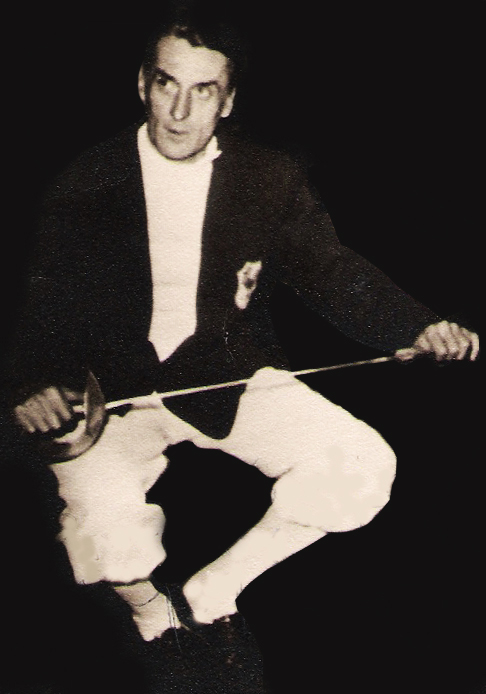

Personal information
- Born: 6 August 1905
- Died: 12 April 1986 (aged 76)

Sport
- Sport: Fencing
Medal record
Men's fencing
Representing France
Olympic Games
Bronze medal – third place	1952 Helsinki	Sabre, team

Jean-François Tournon (6 August 1905 – 12 April 1986) was a French fencer. He won a bronze medal in the team sabre event at the 1952 Summer Olympics.
