= Luis Aranguren =

Venezuelan boxer (1930–1997)

Personal information
- Full name: Luis Ernesto Aranguren González
- Nationality: Venezuelan
- Born: 30 November 1930 Caracas, Venezuela
- Died: 3 November 1997 (aged 66) Guatire, Venezuela

Sport
- Sport: Boxing

Luis Ernesto Aranguren González (30 November 1930 – 3 November 1997) was a Venezuelan boxer. He competed in the men's featherweight event at the 1952 Summer Olympics. Aranguren died in Guatire on 3 November 1997, at the age of 66.
