= Otto Greter =

Swiss fencer (born 1910)

Personal information
- Born: 10 October 1910

Sport
- Sport: Fencing

Otto Greter (born 10 October 1910, date of death unknown) was a Swiss fencer. He competed in the individual and team sabre events at the 1948 and 1952 Summer Olympics.
