= Rafael Cámara =

Mexican fencer

Personal information
- Born: 6 November 1904 Perote, Veracruz, Mexico
- Died: 14 April 1969 (aged 64) Tlalpan, Ciudad de México, Mexico

Sport
- Sport: Fencing

Rafael Leonardo Cámara Anaya (6 November 1904 – 14 April 1969) was a Mexican fencer. He competed in the individual sabre event at the 1952 Summer Olympics.
