= Gustave Balister =

Belgian fencer (1928–2012)

Personal information
- Full name: Gustave Louis Balister
- Born: 2 October 1928 Saint-Gilles, Belgium
- Died: 2012 (aged 83–84) De Haan, Belgium

Sport
- Sport: Fencing

Gustave Louis Balister (2 October 1928 – 2012) was a Belgian fencer. He competed at the 1952 and 1960 Summer Olympics. Balister died in De Haan in 2012.
