= Heinz Lechner =

Austrian fencer (1928–2020)

Heinrich Lebrecht Sebastian Lechner
Personal information
- Born: 26 April 1928
- Died: 4 November 2020 (aged 92)

Sport
- Sport: Fencing

Heinz Lechner (26 April 1928 – 4 November 2020) was an Austrian fencer. He competed at the 1948 and 1952 Summer Olympics.
