= Boris Belyakov =

Soviet fencer

Personal information
- Born: 1927

Sport
- Sport: Fencing

Boris Ivanovich Belyakov (Russian: Борис Иванович Беляков; born 1925 or 1927, date of death unknown) was a Soviet Olympic fencer. He competed in the individual and team sabre events at the 1952 Summer Olympics. He worked at the Smolensk State Institute of Physical Culture and trained students at the M. V. Lomonosov Moscow State University.
