= José D'Andrea =

Argentine fencer

Personal information
- Born: 26 November 1915
- Died: 18 December 2000 (aged 85)

Sport
- Sport: Fencing

José D'Andrea (26 November 1915 – 18 December 2000) was an Argentine sabre fencer. He competed at the 1948 and 1952 Summer Olympics.
