= Vicente Matute =

Venezuelan boxer

Personal information
- Nationality: Venezuelan
- Born: 19 July 1932 (age 92)

Sport
- Sport: Boxing

Vicente Matute (born 19 July 1932) is a Venezuelan boxer. He competed in the men's lightweight event at the 1952 Summer Olympics.
