= Gerda Muller =

Venezuelan fencer

Personal information
- Full name: Gerda Muller Karger
- Born: 7 September 1936
- Died: 22 June 1972 (aged 35)

Sport
- Sport: Fencing

Gerda Muller (7 September 1936 – 22 June 1972) was a Venezuelan fencer. She competed in the women's individual foil event at the 1952 Summer Olympics.
