= Palle Frey =

Danish fencer

Personal information
- Born: 30 October 1920 Copenhagen, Denmark

Sport
- Sport: Fencing

Palle Frey (born 30 October 1920, date of death unknown) was a Danish sabre fencer. He competed at the 1952 and 1960 Summer Olympics.
