= Augusto Gutiérrez =

Venezuelan fencer (born 1930)

Personal information
- Born: 3 October 1930 Táchira, Venezuela

Sport
- Sport: Fencing

Augusto Gutiérrez (born 3 October 1930) is a Venezuelan former foil and sabre fencer. He competed at the 1952 and 1960 Summer Olympics.
