= Vera Schäferkordt =

German swimmer (1924–1987)

Personal information
- Full name: Vera Anna Christel Schäferkordt
- Born: 9 December 1924 Düsseldorf, Germany
- Died: 5 May 1987 (aged 62) Düsseldorf, West Germany

Sport
- Sport: Swimming

Vera Schäferkordt (9 December 1924 – 5 May 1987) was a German swimmer. She competed in two events at the 1952 Summer Olympics.
