= José Raoul de Capriles =

American fencer

Personal information
- Born: February 13, 1912 Mexico City, Mexico
- Died: February 21, 1969 (aged 57) New York, New York, United States

Sport
- Sport: Fencing

José Raoul de Capriles (February 13, 1912 – February 21, 1969) was an American foil and épée fencer. He competed at the 1936, 1948 and 1952 Summer Olympics.

== See also ==
- List of USFA Division I National Champions
