= Werner Plattner =

Austrian fencer (1926–2010)

Personal information
- Born: 31 January 1926
- Died: 6 February 2010 (aged 84)

Sport
- Sport: Fencing

Werner Plattner (31 January 1926 – 6 February 2010) was an Austrian fencer. He competed in the individual and team sabre events at the 1948 and 1952 Summer Olympics.
