= Karl Bach =

German fencer

Personal information
- Born: 21 October 1920
- Died: 1 October 1993 (aged 72)

Sport
- Sport: Fencing

Karl Helmut Bach (21 October 1920 – 1 October 1993) was a German fencer who competed for Saar at the 1952 Summer Olympics. He fenced in the individual and team foil and sabre events.

== See also ==
- Saar at the 1952 Summer Olympics
