= János Szántay =

Personal information
- Nickname: Jancsi
- Born: 16 December 1922 Oradea, Kingdom of Romania
- Died: 17 March 2007 (aged 84) Cluj-Napoca, Romania

Sport
- Sport: Fencing

János Szántay or Ion Santo (16 December 1922 – 17 March 2007) was born to an ethnic Hungarian family in Oradea (Nagyvárad). János Szántay graduated from the University of Cluj in 1949. He worked as a physician in Târgu Mureș and in Cluj. He was a fencer, competing in the individual and team sabre events at the 1952 Summer Olympics. He was also a physician and a scientist conducting research on essential nutrients, especially on magnesium as an essential nutrient. He was made a member of the New York Academy of Sciences in 1969, member of the Nuclear Hematology Research Society of London (1969), member of the Hungarian Academy of Sciences (1992), and the honorary member of the Magyar Magnézium Társaság, as well as an honorary chairman of Magnezia Society of Romania, from 1992.
