= Edmundo López =

Venezuelan fencer

Personal information
- Born: 13 August 1935 (age 90)

Sport
- Sport: Fencing

Edmundo López (born 13 August 1935) is a Venezuelan fencer. He competed in the individual and team sabre events at the 1952 Summer Olympics.
