= Ernst Rau =

German fencer

Personal information
- Born: 4 January 1927
- Died: 2 May 2012 (aged 85)

Sport
- Sport: Fencing

Ernst Rau (4 January 1927 – 2 May 2012) was a German fencer who competed for Saar at the 1952 Summer Olympics. He fenced in the individual and team foil and sabre events.

== See also ==
- Saar at the 1952 Summer Olympics
