= Günther Knödler =

German fencer

Personal information
- Born: 10 January 1925
- Died: 3 August 1996 (aged 71)

Sport
- Sport: Fencing

Ernst Günther Jakob Knödler (10 January 1925 – 3 August 1996) was a German fencer in the individual and team foil and sabre events for Saar at the 1952 Summer Olympics.
