= Leszek Suski =

Polish fencer

Personal information
- Born: 15 April 1930 Włostów, Poland
- Died: 19 April 2007 (aged 77) Kraków, Poland

Sport
- Sport: Fencing

Leszek Suski (15 April 1930 – 19 April 2007) was a Polish fencer. He competed in the individual and team sabre events at the 1952 Summer Olympics.
