= Ilie Tudor =

Romanian fencer

Personal information
- Born: 11 July 1924 Bucharest, Romania

Sport
- Sport: Fencing

Ilie Tudor (born 11 July 1924) is a Romanian fencer. He competed in three events at the 1952 Summer Olympics.
