= François Heywaert =

Belgian fencer (1922–2008)

Personal information
- Full name: François Jules Heywaert
- Born: 26 March 1922 Ixelles, Belgium
- Died: 18 February 2008 (aged 85) Woluwe-Saint-Lambert, Belgium

Sport
- Sport: Fencing

François Jules Heywaert (26 March 1922 – 18 February 2008) was a Belgian fencer. He competed at the 1952 and 1960 Summer Olympics. died in Woluwe-Saint-Lambert on 18 February 2008, at the age of 85.
