= Ivan Manayenko =

Soviet fencer

Personal information
- Born: Ivan Ilyich Manayenko; December 5, 1919 Yenakiieve, Yekaterinoslav Governorate, Ukrainian SSR
- Died: 1985 (aged 65–66)

Sport
- Sport: Fencing

Ivan Ilyich Manayenko (Russian: Иван Ильич Манаенко; 5 December 1919 – 1985) was a Soviet fencer. He competed in the individual and team sabre events at the 1952 Summer Olympics.
