= Olaf Sandner =

Venezuelan fencer

Personal information
- Born: 24 July 1923
- Died: 20 November 2013 (aged 90)

Sport
- Sport: Fencing

Olaf Sandner (24 July 1923 – 20 November 2013) was a Venezuelan épée and sabre fencer. He competed in three events at the 1952 Summer Olympics.
