= Gustavo Gutiérrez (fencer) =

Venezuelan fencer (born 1933)

Personal information
- Born: 7 April 1933 (age 93)

Sport
- Sport: Fencing

Gustavo Gutiérrez (born 7 April 1933) is a Venezuelan épée, foil and sabre fencer. He competed in five events at the 1952 Summer Olympics.
