= Willy Fascher =

German fencer

Personal information
- Born: 5 May 1912 Hanover, German Empire
- Died: 14 December 1989 (aged 77) Hanover, West Germany

Sport
- Sport: Fencing

Willy Fascher (5 May 1912 – 14 December 1989) was a German fencer. He competed in the individual and team foil and team sabre events at the 1952 Summer Olympics.
