= Richard Liebscher =

German fencer

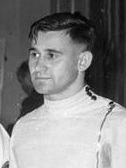
- Richard Liebscher in his fencing uniform, 1938

Personal information
- Born: 2 November 1910 Nuremberg, German Empire
- Died: 13 January 1990 (aged 79) Erkelsdorf, West Germany

Sport
- Sport: Fencing
- Team: Schutzstaffel

Richard Liebscher (2 November 1910 – 13 January 1990) was a German fencer. He competed in the individual and team sabre events at the 1952 Summer Olympics.
