= Cycling at the 1952 Summer Olympics =

Cycling at the Games of the XV Olympiad
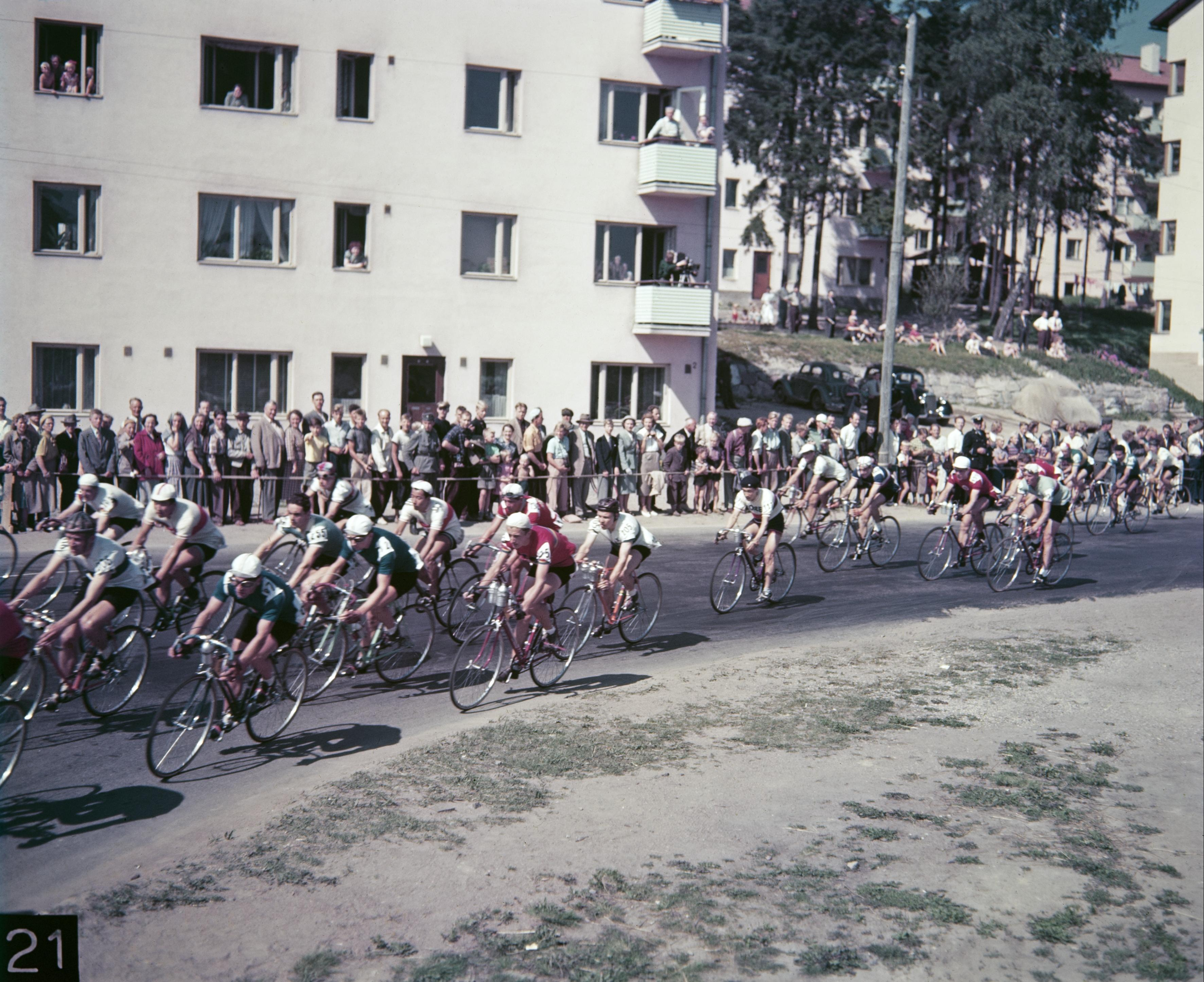
- Venues: Käpylä and the surrounding area Helsinki Velodrome
- Date: 28 –31 July 1952 (track); 2 August 1952 (road)
- Competitors: 215 from 36 nations

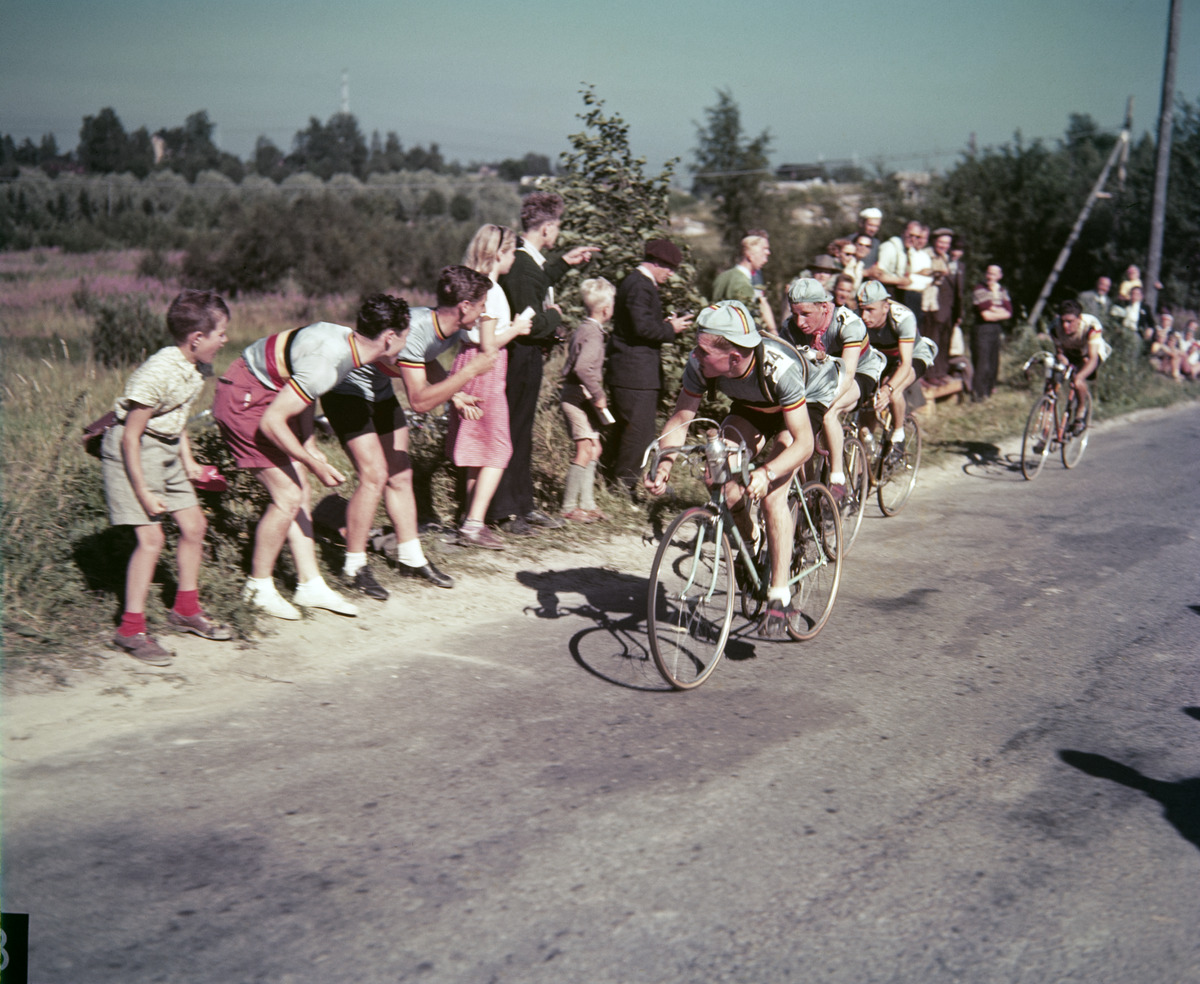
Three Belgian cyclists during the road race.

The cycling competition at the 1952 Summer Olympics consisted of two road cycling events and four track cycling events, all for men only. 215 cyclists from 36 countries competed in the six events.

== Medal summary ==
=== Road cycling ===
Games	Gold	Silver	Bronze
Road race, Individual	André Noyelle; Belgium	Robert Grondelaers; Belgium	Edi Ziegler; Germany
Road race, Team	Belgium; Robert Grondelaers; André Noyelle; Lucien Victor	Italy; Dino Bruni; Gianni Ghidini; Vincenzo Zucconelli	France; Jacques Anquetil; Claude Rouer; Alfred Tonello

=== Track cycling ===
Games	Gold	Silver	Bronze
Pursuit, Team	Italy; Marino Morettini; Loris Campana; Mino de Rossi; Guido Messina	South Africa; Alfred Swift; George Estman; Robert Fowler; Thomas Shardelow	Great Britain; Ronald Stretton; Donald Burgess; George Newberry; Alan Newton
Sprint	Enzo Sacchi; Italy	Lionel Cox; Australia	Werner Potzernheim; Germany
Tandem	Lionel Cox and Russell Mockridge (AUS)	Raymond Robinson and Thomas Shardelow (RSA)	Antonio Maspes and Cesare Pinarello (ITA)
Time trial	Russell Mockridge; Australia	Marino Morettini; Italy	Raymond Robinson; South Africa

== Participating nations ==
215 cyclists from 36 nations competed.

- Argentina (6)
- Australia (6)
- Austria (4)
- Belgium (11)
- Bulgaria (5)
- Canada (2)
- Chile (4)
- Czechoslovakia (6)
- Denmark (13)
- Finland (11)
- France (10)
- Germany (5)
- Great Britain (12)
- Guatemala (5)
- Hungary (6)
- India (5)
- Italy (11)
- Japan (4)
- Jamaica (1)
- Liechtenstein (2)
- Luxembourg (4)
- Mexico (4)
- Netherlands (6)
- New Zealand (2)
- Norway (3)
- Pakistan (2)
- Romania (5)
- South Africa (5)
- South Korea (3)
- Vietnam (4)
- Soviet Union (10)
- Sweden (8)
- Switzerland (10)
- United States (9)
- Uruguay (7)
- Venezuela (4)

== Medal table ==
Rank	Nation	Gold	Silver	Bronze	Total
1	Italy	2	2	1	5
2	Australia	2	1	0	3
2	Belgium	2	1	0	3
4	South Africa	0	2	1	3
5	Germany	0	0	2	2
6	France	0	0	1	1
6	Great Britain	0	0	1	1
Totals (7 entries)		6	6	6	18
