= Australia at the 1952 Summer Olympics =

- IOC code: AUS
- NOC: Australian Olympic Federation

in Helsinki
- Competitors: 81 (71 men, 10 women) in 12 sports
- Flag bearer: Mervyn Wood
- Medals Ranked 9th: Gold 6 Silver 2 Bronze 3 Total 11

Summer Olympics appearances (overview)
- 1896; 1900; 1904; 1908; 1912; 1920; 1924; 1928; 1932; 1936; 1948; 1952; 1956; 1960; 1964; 1968; 1972; 1976; 1980; 1984; 1988; 1992; 1996; 2000; 2004; 2008; 2012; 2016; 2020; 2024

Other related appearances
- 1906 Intercalated Games –––– Australasia (1908–1912)

Australia competed at the 1952 Summer Olympics in Helsinki, Finland. 81 competitors, 71 men and 10 women, took part in 67 events in 12 sports. Australian athletes have competed in every Summer Olympic Games. As the country hosted the next Olympics in Melbourne, the flag of Australia was flown at the closing ceremony.

== Medalists ==
=== Gold ===
- Marjorie Jackson-Nelson — Athletics, Women's 100 metres
- Marjorie Jackson-Nelson — Athletics, Women's 200 metres
- Shirley Strickland — Athletics, Women's 80m Hurdles
- Russell Mockridge — Cycling, Men's 1000m Time Trial
- Lionel Cox and Russell Mockridge — Cycling, Men's 2000m Tandem
- John Davies — Swimming, Men's 200m Breaststroke

=== Silver ===
- Lionel Cox — Cycling, Men's 1000m Sprint (Scratch)
- Mervyn Wood — Rowing, Men's Single Sculls

=== Bronze ===
- Shirley Strickland — Athletics, Women's 100 metres
- David Anderson, Phil Cayzer, Ernest Chapman, Tom Chessel, Mervyn Finlay, Nimrod Greenwood, Edward Pain, Bob Tinning, and Geoff Williamson — Rowing, Men's Eights
- Vern Barberis — Weightlifting, Men's Lightweight

== Athletics ==
Key

- Note–Ranks given for track events are within the athlete's heat only
- Q = Qualified for the next round
- q = Qualified for the next round as a fastest loser or, in field events, by position without achieving the qualifying target
- NR = National record
- N/A = Round not applicable for the event
- Bye = Athlete not required to compete in round

Men
Track & road events

Athlete	Event	Heat		Quarterfinal		Semifinal		Final	
Athlete	Event	Result	Rank	Result	Rank	Result	Rank	Result	Rank
John Treloar	100 m	10.92	1 Q	10.84	2 Q	10.76	3 Q	10.91	6
Edwin Carr	200 m	22.19	1 Q	21.98	3	did not advance			
John Treloar	200 m	21.75	1 Q	21.86	1 Q	DNF		did not advance	
Edwin Carr	400 m	48.23	3	did not advance					
Morris Curotta	400 m	48.87	2 Q	48.86	4	did not advance			
Don MacMillan	800 m	1:55.0	3 Q	—N/a		1:58.4	8	did not advance	
John Landy	1500 m	3:57.0	5	—N/a		did not advance			
Don MacMillan	1500 m	3:52.0	4 Q	—N/a		3:50.8	3 Q	3:49.6	9
John Landy	5000 m	14:56.4	10	—N/a				did not advance	
Les Perry	5000 m	14:27.0	4 Q	—N/a				14:23.6	6
Les Perry	10,000 m	—N/a						DNF	
Ken Doubleday	110 m hurdles	14.5	1 Q	—N/a		14.5	3 Q	14.82	5
Ray Weinberg	110 m hurdles	14.4	1 Q	—N/a		14.5	3 Q	15.15	6
Ken Doubleday	400 m hurdles	55.4	3 Q	1:00.2	6	did not advance			
Edwin Carr; Morris Curotta; Ken Doubleday; Ray Weinberg	4 × 100 m relay	42.3	5	—N/a		did not advance			
Edwin Carr; Morris Curotta; Ken Doubleday; Ray Weinberg	4 × 400 m relay	3:16.00	5	—N/a				did not advance	
Robert Prentice	Marathon	—N/a						2:43:13.4	37
Claude Smeal	Marathon	—N/a						2:52:23.0	45
Don Keane	10 km walk	46:55.2	5 Q	—N/a				47:37.0	10

Field events

Athlete	Event	Qualification		Final	
Athlete	Event	Distance	Position	Distance	Position
Pat Leane	Long jump	6.40	24	did not advance	
Pat Leane	High jump	1.87	25 Q	1.80	24
Ian Reed	Discus throw	45.00	21	did not advance	

Combined events – Decathlon

Athlete	Event	100 m	LJ	SP	HJ	400 m	110H	DT	PV	JT	1500 m	Final	Rank
Pat Leane	Result	11.82	5.22	DNS	—	—	—	—	—	—	—	DNF	
Pat Leane	Points	623	341	—	—	—	—	—	—	—	—	DNF	

Women
Track & road events

Athlete	Event	Heat		Quarterfinal		Semifinal		Final	
Athlete	Event	Result	Rank	Result	Rank	Result	Rank	Result	Rank
Winsome Cripps	100 m	12.0	1 Q	12.1	3 Q	12.0	2 Q	11.9	4
Marjorie Jackson	100 m	11.6	1 Q	11.6	1 Q	11.5	1 Q	11.5	1st place, gold medalist(s)
Shirley Strickland de la Hunty	100 m	12.0	1 Q	12.0	3 Q	11.9	2 Q	11.9	3rd place, bronze medalist(s)
Winsome Cripps	200 m	24.4	2 Q	—N/a		24.3	2 Q	24.2	4
Marjorie Jackson	200 m	23.6	1 Q	—N/a		23.4	1 Q	23.7	1st place, gold medalist(s)
Shirley Strickland de la Hunty	80 m hurdles	11.0	1 Q	—N/a		10.8	1 Q	10.9	1st place, gold medalist(s)
Winsome Cripps; Marjorie Jackson; Verna Johnston; Shirley Strickland de la Hunty	4 × 100 m relay	46.1	1 Q	—N/a				46.6	5

Field events

Athlete	Event	Qualification		Final	
Athlete	Event	Distance	Position	Distance	Position
Verna Johnston	Long jump	5.58	10 Q	5.74	8

== Boxing ==
Athlete	Event	Round of 32	Round of 16	Quarterfinals	Semifinals	Final	
Athlete	Event	Opposition Result	Opposition Result	Opposition Result	Opposition Result	Opposition Result	Rank
Ronald Gower	Bantamweight	Niedźwiedzki (POL); L TKO	did not advance				
Donald McDonnell	Featherweight	Roth (GER); L PTS	did not advance				
Norman Jones	Light welterweight	Mednov (URS); L TKO	did not advance				
Tony Madigan	Middleweight	Bye	Silchev (URS); W PTS	Sjölin (SWE); L PTS	did not advance		5
Carl Fitzgerald	Heavyweight	Bye	Netuka (TCH); L PTS	did not advance			

== Cycling ==
Road races

Individual times added together for team race, 3 times needed for team event.

Cyclist	Event	Final	
Cyclist	Event	Result	Rank
Peter Pryor	Individual road race	5:22:33.5	34
Jim Nevin	Individual road race	5:22:33.6	35
Ken Caves	Individual road race	did not finish	
Peter Nelson	Individual road race	did not finish	
Peter Pryor; Jim Nevin; Ken Caves; Peter Nelson	Team road race	did not finish	

Track

Ranks given are within the heat.

Cyclist	Event	First round		First repechage		Quarterfinals		Second repechage		Semifinals		Final	
Cyclist	Event	Result	Rank	Result	Rank	Result	Rank	Result	Rank	Result	Rank	Result	Rank
Lionel Cox	Sprint	11.9	1 Q	Directly advanced		12.5	1 Q	Directly advanced		11.6	1 Q		2nd place, silver medalist(s)
Russell Mockridge	Time trial	n/a										1:11.1	1st place, gold medalist(s)
Lionel Cox; Russell Mockridge	Tandem	11.4	1 Q	Directly advanced		11.1	1 Q	Directly advanced		11.0	1 Q	11.0	1st place, gold medalist(s)
Jim Nevin; Ken Caves; Peter Nelson; Peter Pryor	Team pursuit	5:11.1	17	did not advance									

== Diving ==
Men

Athlete	Event	Preliminaries		Final	
Athlete	Event	Points	Rank	Points	Rank
Ronald Faulds	3 m springboard	59.90	24	did not advance	
Francis Murphy	3 m springboard	48.82	34	did not advance	
Francis Murphy	10 m platform	64.10	21	did not advance	

== Fencing ==
Six fencers, four men and two women, represented Australia in 1952.

Men

Fencer	Event	First round		Quarterfinals		Semifinals		Final	
Fencer	Event	Result	Rank	Result	Rank	Result	Rank	Result	Rank
John Fethers	Foil	5–2	1T Q	2–3	6	did not advance			
Ivan Lund	Foil	3–3	5	did not advance					
Jock Gibson	Foil	1–4	6	did not advance					
John Fethers	Épée	3–4	4 Q	4–4	5	did not advance			
Ivan Lund	Épée	5–2	1 Q	1–6	8	did not advance			
Charles Stanmore	Épée	1–6	8	did not advance					
John Fethers	Sabre	2–6	6	did not advance					
Jock Gibson	Sabre	2–5	7	did not advance					
Ivan Lund	Sabre	4–4	8	did not advance					
Charles Stanmore; Jock Gibson; John Fethers; Ivan Lund	Team sabre	0–2	3	did not advance					
Jock Gibson; Charles Stanmore; John Fethers; Ivan Lund	Team épée	0–2	3	did not advance					
Charles Stanmore; John Fethers; Jock Gibson; Ivan Lund	Team foil	0–2	3	did not advance					

Women

Fencer	Event	First round		Quarterfinals		Semifinals		Final	
Fencer	Event	Result	Rank	Result	Rank	Result	Rank	Result	Rank
Catherine Pym	Foil	1–4	5	did not advance					
Patricia Norford	Foil	0–5	6	did not advance					

== Modern pentathlon ==
One male pentathlete represented Australia in 1952.

Athlete	Event	Riding (cross-country steeplechase)		Fencing (épée)		Shooting (Rapid fire pistol)		Swimming (300 m freestyle)		Running (4000 m cross-country)		Total points	Final rank
Athlete	Event	Time	Rank	Wins	Rank	Points	Rank	Time	Rank	Time	Rank	Total points	Final rank
Forbes Carlile	Individual	10:14.2	13	16	45	180	21	4:31.0	10	16:35.2	34	123	25

== Rowing ==
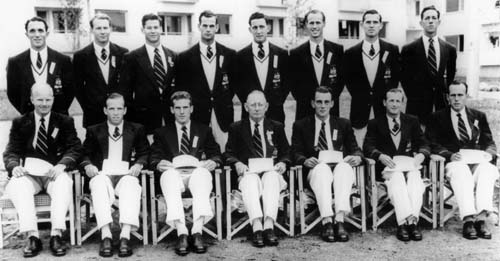
Australian Olympic rowing squad for the 1952 Helsinki Olympics

Men

Athlete	Event	First round		First repechage		Semifinals		Second repechage		Final	
Athlete	Event	Time	Rank	Time	Rank	Time	Rank	Time	Rank	Time	Rank
Mervyn Wood	Single sculls	7:44.1	1 Q	Bye		8:02.5	2 R	7:45.5	1 Q	8:14.5	2nd place, silver medalist(s)
John Rogers; Murray Riley	Double sculls	7:16.7	3 R	7:03.0	1 Q	Bye		7:13.1	3	did not advance	
Don Palmer; Vic Middleton	Coxless pair	8:06.4	1 Q	Bye		7:46.8	2 R	7:50.5	3	did not advance	
Bob Tinning; Ernest Chapman; Nimrod Greenwood; David Anderson; Geoff Williamson; Mervyn Finlay; Edward Pain; Phil Cayzer; Tom Chessell	Eights	6:07.2	2 Q	Bye		6:44.5	3 R	6:09.6	1 Q	6:33.1	3rd place, bronze medalist(s)

== Sailing ==
Athlete	Event	Race							Net points	Final rank
Athlete	Event	I	II	III	IV	V	VI	VII	Net points	Final rank
Peter Attrill	Finn	507	293	~~0~~	548	293	0	372	2013	22
Barton Harvey; Kevin Wilson	Star	277	~~122~~	520	168	144	344	122	1697	18
Jock Sturrock; Bevan Worcester; Douglas Buxton	Dragon	331	~~185~~	632	331	252	185	185	2101	12

== Swimming ==
Men

Athlete	Event	Heat		Semifinal		Final	
Athlete	Event	Time	Rank	Time	Rank	Time	Rank
Rex Aubrey	100 m freestyle	58.2	=6 Q	57.8	=3 Q	58.7	6
Frank O'Neill	100 m freestyle	1:00.6	29	did not advance			
Garrick Agnew	400 m freestyle	4:55.5	24	did not advance			
John Marshall	400 m freestyle	4:46.8	11 Q	4:50.3	15	did not advance	
Garrick Agnew	1500 m freestyle	20:03.8	24	—N/a		did not advance	
John Marshall	1500 m freestyle	19:09.2	6 Q	—N/a		19:53.4	8
Frank O'Neill	100 m backstroke	1:10.5	=21	did not advance			
John Davies	200 m breaststroke	2:39.7	7 Q	2:36.8	1 Q	2:34.4	1st place, gold medalist(s)
David Hawkins	200 m breaststroke	2:41.2	11 Q	2:39.8	10	did not advance	
Garrick Agnew; Rex Aubrey; John Marshall; Frank O'Neill	4 × 200 m freestyle relay	9:01.4	9	—N/a		did not advance	

Women

Athlete	Event	Heat		Semifinal		Final	
Athlete	Event	Time	Rank	Time	Rank	Time	Rank
Denise Norton	100 m freestyle	1:11.8	28	did not advance			
Marjorie McQuade	100 m freestyle	1:07.9	11 Q	1:08.2	=12	did not advance	
Judy Davies	400 m freestyle	5:21.2	6 Q	5:25.6	10	did not advance	
Denise Norton	400 m freestyle	5:28.5	14 Q	5:30.9	14	did not advance	
Nancy Lyons	200 m breaststroke	3:04.4	13 Q	3:05.6	15	did not advance	

== Water polo ==
Australia failed to advance to the pool stage after losing both qualifiers.

Roster

- Doug Laing
- Raymond Smee
- Jake Foster
- Peter Bennett
- Frank Jordan
- Malcolm Hastie
- William Orchard

Qualifying

July 25, 1952	Australia	2–10	Yugoslavia

July 26, 1952	Australia	0–6	Austria

== Weightlifting ==
Lifter	Event	Press		Snatch		Jerk		Final	
Lifter	Event	Kg	Rank	Kg	Rank	Kg	Rank	Kg	Rank
Vern Barberis	Lightweight	105.0	1T	105.0	6T	140.0	2T	350.0	3rd place, bronze medalist(s)
Fred Giffin	Middleweight	107.5	7T	100.0	15T	127.5	16T	335.0	15
Ken MacDonald	Middle–heavyweight	107.5	11T	125.0	2T	152.5	5	385.0	6

== Wrestling ==
Key:

- VT – Victory by Fall.
- VB – Victory by injury.
- PP – Decision by Points – the loser with technical points.
- PO – Decision by Points – the loser without technical points.
- ST – Technical superiority – the loser without technical points and a margin of victory of at least 8 (Greco-Roman) or 10 (freestyle) points.

Men's freestyle

Athlete	Event	Round one	Round two	Round three	Round four	Round five	Final / BM	
Athlete	Event	Opposition Result	Opposition Result	Opposition Result	Opposition Result	Opposition Result	Opposition Result	Rank
Richard Elliott	Featherweight	Mammana (ARG); L 1–3 ^{PP}	Henson (USA); L 0–3 ^{VT}	did not advance				
Dick Garrard	Lightweight	Vard (IRL); W 3–1 ^{PP}	Blasi (ARG); W 3–1 ^{PP}	Shimotori (JPN); L 1–3 ^{PP}	did not advance			
Bev Scott	Welterweight	Don Irvine (GBR); W 3–1 ^{PP}	Leclerc (FRA); W 3–1 ^{PP}	Mojtabavi (IRN); L 1–3 ^{PP}	did not advance			
Kevin Coote	Light-heavyweight	Palm (SWE); L 1–3 ^{PP}	Zandi (IRN); L 1–3 ^{PP}	did not advance				
