= Cycling at the 1952 Summer Olympics – Men's team pursuit =

Men's team pursuit at the Games of the XV Olympiad
- Dates: July 28–29, 1952
- Competitors: 89 from 22 nations

Medalists
1st place, gold medalist(s)		Guido Messina, Loris Campana, Marino Morettini, Mino De Rossi
2nd place, silver medalist(s)		Alfred Swift, George Estman, Robert Fowler, Thomas Shardelow
3rd place, bronze medalist(s)		Alan Newton, Donald Burgess, George Newberry, Ronald Stretton

These are the official results of the Men's 4.000m Team Pursuit at the 1952 Summer Olympics in Helsinki, Finland, held on July 28 and July 29, 1952. There were 89 participant from 22 nations. In the first round each team raced alone, with the first eight teams qualifying for the quarterfinals.

== Final classification ==
RANK	NAME CYCLISTS	TEAM
	Guido Messina; Loris Campana; Marino Morettini; Mino De Rossi	Italy
	Alfred Swift; George Estman; Robert Fowler; Thomas Shardelow	South Africa
	Alan Newton; Donald Burgess; George Newberry; Ronald Stretton	Great Britain
4.	Claude Brugerolles; Henri Andrieux; Jean-Marie Joubert; Pierre Michel	France
5.	Gabriel Glorieux; José Pauwels; Paul De Paepe; Robert Raymond	Belgium
6.	Bent Jørgensen; Jean Hansen; Knud Andersen; Preben Lundgren Kristensen; Henning R. Larsen	Denmark
7.	Adrie Voorting; Daan de Groot; Jan Plantaz; Jules Maenen	Netherlands
8.	Hans Pfenninger; Heinrich Müller; Max Wirth; Oskar von Büren	Switzerland
9.	Oscar Giacché; Oscar Pezoa; Pedro Salas; Rodolfo Caccavo	Argentina
10.	Imre Furmen; István Lang; István Pásztor; István Schillerwein	Hungary
11.	Arne Johansson; Bengt Fröbom; Owe Nordqvist; Stig Andersson	Sweden
12.	Atilio François; Juan de Armas; Luis Ángel de los Santos; Luis Serra	Uruguay
13.	Arthur Mannsbarth; Franz Wimmer; Kurt Nemetz; Walter Bortel	Austria
14.	Nikolai Matvejev; Valentin Mikhaylov; Vasily Fedin; Viktor Meshkov	Soviet Union
15.	Aimo Jokinen; Nils Henriksson; Paul Nyman; Urho Sirén	Finland
16.	Boyan Kotsev; Dimitar Bobchev; Ilya Velchev; Milcho Rusev	Bulgaria
17.	Jim Nevin; Ken Caves; Peter Nelson; Peter Pryor	Australia
18.	Donald Sheldon; James Lauf; Steven Hromjak; Thomas Montemage	United States
19.	Kihei Tomioka; Masazumi Tajima; Tadashi Kato; Tamotsu Chikanari	Japan
20.	Andoni Ituarte; Danilo Heredia; Luis Toro; Ramón Echegaray	Venezuela
21.	Armando Castillo; Carlos Sandoval; Fernando Marroquin; Juan Montoya	Guatemala
22.	Netai Bysack; Raj Kumar Mehra; Suprovat Chakravarty; Tarit Kumar Sett	India
