= 1953 UCI Track Cycling World Championships =

Championship for track cycling in Zürich Switzerland

- Venue: Zurich, Switzerland
- Date: 21–26 August 1953
- Velodrome: Oerlikon Velodrome
- Events: 5

The 1953 UCI Track Cycling World Championships were the World Championship for track cycling. They took place in Zurich, Switzerland from 21 to 26 August 1953. Five events for men were contested, 3 for professionals and 2 for amateurs.

== Medal summary ==
Event	Gold	Silver	Bronze
Men's Professional Events
Men's sprint	Arie van Vliet; Netherlands	Enzo Sacchi; Italy	Reg Harris; Great Britain
Men's individual pursuit	Sid Patterson; Australia	Kay-Werner Nielsen; Denmark	Antonio Bevilacqua; Italy
Men's motor-paced	Adolph Verschueren; Belgium	Roger Queugnet; France	Henri Lemoine; France
Men's Amateur Events
Men's sprint	Marino Morettini; Italy	Cesare Pinarello; Italy	Werner Potzernheim; West Germany
Men's individual pursuit	Guido Messina; Italy	Loris Campana; Italy	Daan de Groot; Netherlands

== Medal table ==
Rank	Nation	Gold	Silver	Bronze	Total
1	Italy (ITA)	2	3	1	6
2	Netherlands (NED)	1	0	1	2
3	Australia (AUS)	1	0	0	1
3	Belgium (BEL)	1	0	0	1
5	France (FRA)	0	1	1	2
6	Denmark (DEN)	0	1	0	1
7	Great Britain (GBR)	0	0	1	1
7	West Germany (FRG)	0	0	1	1
Totals (8 entries)		5	5	5	15

== See also ==
- 1953 UCI Road World Championships
