= Arne Johansen =

Arne Johansen may refer to:

- Arne Johansen (speed skater)
- Arne Johansen (footballer)

== See also ==
- Arne Johansson (disambiguation)
