= Six Days of Buenos Aires =

Coordinates: 34°36′8.73″S 58°22′7.28″W

Race details
- Region: Buenos Aires, Argentina
- Discipline: Track
- Type: Six-day racing

History
- First edition: 1936
- Editions: 27

The Six Days of Buenos Aires was a former six-day cycling event, held in Luna Park stadium, Buenos Aires, Argentina. As many as 27 editions took place from 1936 until 2000, though there were at times single years or even long gaps (such as 1950-55 and 1965-82) when the event was not raced.

== Winners ==
| Edition | Winners | Second | Third |
|---|---|---|---|
| 1936 | (Spain) Antonio Prior (Spain) Rafael Ramos | (United States) Bobby Echeverria (Republic of Ireland) Jackie Sheehan | (Nazi Germany) Willy Korsmeier (Nazi Germany) Karl Kretschmer |
| 1937 I | (Nazi Germany) Gottfried Hürtgen (Nazi Germany) Karl Göbel | (Spain) Vicente Demetrio (Spain) Antonio Prior | (Nazi Germany) Willy Korsmeier (Spain) Luciano Montero Hernandez |
| 1937 II | (Nazi Germany) Gottfried Hürtgen (Nazi Germany) Karl Göbel | (Italy) Gino Banbagiotti (United States) Ferdinand Grillo | (Belgium) Jean Van Buggenhout (Belgium) Michel Van Vlockhoven |
| 1938 | Not raced | | |
| 1939 | (Argentina) Remigio Saavedra (Belgium) Camiel Dekuysscher | (United States) Ferdinand Grillo (Italy) Raffaele Di Paco | (Nazi Germany) Karl Göbel (Nazi Germany) Gottfried Hürtgen |
| 1940 | (Nazi Germany) Gottfried Hürtgen (Italy) Raffaele Di Paco | (Denmark) Erland Christensen (Argentina) Mario Mathieu | (Belgium) Roger Deneef (Belgium) Constant Huys |
| 1941 | Not raced | | |
| 1942 | (France) Fernand Wambst (Italy) Antonio Bertola | (Argentina) Mario Mathieu (Argentina) Remigio Saavedra | (Belgium) Constant Huys (Netherlands) Frans Slaats |
| 1943 | (Argentina) Remigio Saavedra (Argentina) Mario Mathieu | (Italy) Antonio Bertola (Italy) Raffaele Di Paco | (Belgium) Constant Huys (Netherlands) Frans Slaats |
| 1944 | (Netherlands) Frans Slaats (Italy) Raffaele Di Paco | (Argentina) Mario Mathieu (Argentina) Remigio Saavedra | (Italy) Antonio Bertola (Belgium) Constant Huys |
| 1945 | (Argentina) Remigio Saavedra (Argentina) Mario Mathieu | (Italy) Antonio Bertola (Italy) Raffaele Di Paco | (Belgium) Constant Huys (Italy) Bruno Loatti |
| 1946 | (France) Émile Ignat (France) Gilbert Doré | (Argentina) Angel Castellani (Argentina) Mario Mathieu | (Belgium) Raoul Breuskin (Belgium) Emile Bruneau |
| 1947 | (France) Alvaro Giorgetti (Italy) Antonio Bertola | (France) Gilbert Doré (France) Émile Ignat | (Belgium) Emile Bruneau (Argentina) Remigio Saavedra |
| 1948 | (Argentina) Ángel Castellani (Italy) Antonio Bertola | (France) Alvaro Giorgetti (France) Robert Vercellone | (Spain) Alejandro Fombellida (France) Raoul Martin |
| 1949 I | (France) Alvaro Giorgetti (France) Robert Vercellone | (Spain) Alejandro Fombellida (France) Raoul Martin | (Italy) Antonio Bertola (Argentina) Angel Castellani |
| 1949 II | (France) Raoul Martin (Spain) Alejandro Fombellida | | |
| 1950-55 | Not raced | | |
| 1956 | (Argentina) Héctor Acosta (Argentina) Bruno Sivilotti | (Argentina) Antonio Alexandre (Argentina) Rodolfo Caccavo | (Argentina) Elvio Giacche (Argentina) Oscar Giacche |
| 1957 | Not raced | | |
| 1958 | (Italy) Fausto Coppi (Argentina) Jorge Batiz | (Spain) Alfredo Estmatges (Spain) Gabriel Saura | (Argentina) Antonio Alexandre (Argentina) Ramon Vazquez |
| 1959 | (Argentina) Jorge Batiz (Italy) Mino De Rossi | (France) Jacques Bellenger (France) Bernard Bouvard | (Argentina) Antonio Alexandre (Argentina) Dulio Biganzoli |
| 1960 | (Italy) Enzo Sacchi (Italy) Ferdinando Terruzzi | (Argentina) Jorge Batiz (Argentina) Ramon Vazquez | (France) Bernard Bouvard (France) Jean Raynal |
| 1961 | (Spain) Miguel Poblet (Argentina) Jorge Batiz | (Italy) Leandro Faggin (Italy) Guido Messina | (Germany) Manfred Donike (Germany) Edy Gieseler |
| 1962 | Not raced | | |
| 1963 | (Argentina) Ricardo Senn (Argentina) Jorge Batiz | (Spain) Guillermo Timoner (Spain) Francisco Tortella | (Germany) Willi Altig (Belgium) Leo Sterckx |
| 1964 | (Argentina) Ricardo Senn (Argentina) Jorge Batiz | (Germany) Gustav Kilian (Belgium) Robert Lelangue | (Argentina) Carlos Roqueiro (Italy) Mino De Rossi |
| 1965-82 | Not raced | | |
| 1983 | (Belgium) Willy Debosscher (Germany) Stefan Schröpfer | (Spain) Avelino Perea (Spain) Modesto Urrutibeazcoa | (Argentina) Marcelo Alexandre (Argentina) Eduardo Trillini |
| 1984 | (Liechtenstein) Roman Hermann (Argentina) Eduardo Trillini | (Spain) Avelino Perea (Spain) Modesto Urrutibeazcoa | (Belgium) Willy Debosscher (Netherlands) Rene Kos |
| 1985-86 | Not raced | | |
| 1987 | (Argentina) Marcelo Alexandre (Argentina) Eduardo Trillini | | |
| 1988-92 | Not raced | | |
| 1993 | (Argentina) Marcelo Alexandre (Australia) Danny Clark | (Argentina) Gabriel Curuchet (Argentina) Juan Curuchet | (Argentina) Hugo Patissoli (Argentina) Erminio Suarez |
| 1994-98 | Not raced | | |
| 1999 | (Argentina) Juan Curuchet (Argentina) Gabriel Curuchet | (Italy) Adriano Baffi (Italy) Andrea Collinelli | (Denmark) Jimmi Madsen (Switzerland) Bruno Risi |
| 2000 | (Argentina) Juan Curuchet (Argentina) Gabriel Curuchet | (Spain) Juan Llaneras (Argentina) Walter Perez | (Argentina) Gustavo Artacho (Switzerland) Bruno Risi |
