= 1951 UCI Track Cycling World Championships =

Cycling tournament

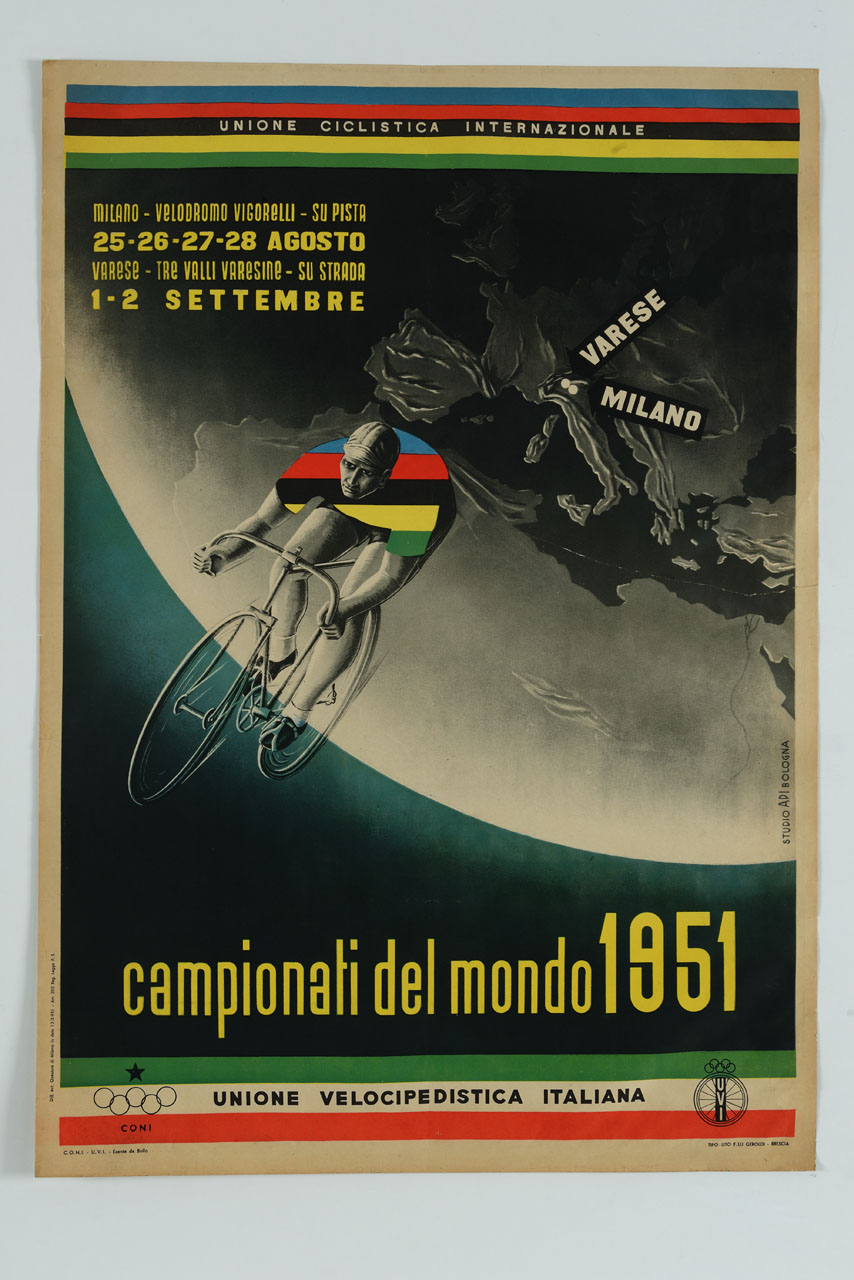
- Venue: Milan, Italy
- Date: 24–28 August 1951
- Velodrome: Velodromo Vigorelli
- Events: 5

The 1951 UCI Track Cycling World Championships were the World Championship for track cycling. They took place in Milan, Italy from 24 to 28 August 1951. Five events for men were contested, 3 for professionals and 2 for amateurs.

In the same period, the 1951 UCI Road World Championships were organized in Varese, Italy.

== Medal summary ==
Event	Gold	Silver	Bronze
Men's Professional Events
Men's sprint	Reg Harris; Great Britain	Jacques Bellenger; France	Sid Patterson; Australia
Men's individual pursuit	Antonio Bevilacqua; Italy	Hugo Koblet; Switzerland	Kay Werner Nielsen; Denmark
Men's motor-paced	Jan Pronk; Netherlands	Andreas Leliaert; Belgium	Henri Lemoine; France
Men's Amateur Events
Men's sprint	Enzo Sacchi; Italy	Russell Mockridge; Australia	Marino Morettini; Italy
Men's individual pursuit	Mino De Rossi; Italy	Raphael Glorieux; Belgium	Guido Messina; Italy

== Medal table ==
Rank	Nation	Gold	Silver	Bronze	Total
1	Italy (ITA)	3	0	2	5
2	Great Britain (GBR)	1	0	0	1
2	Netherlands (NED)	1	0	0	1
4	Belgium (BEL)	0	2	0	2
5	Australia (AUS)	0	1	1	2
5	France (FRA)	0	1	1	2
7	Switzerland (SUI)	0	1	0	1
8	Denmark (DEN)	0	0	1	1
Totals (8 entries)		5	5	5	15

== See also ==
- 1951 UCI Road World Championships
