= Stig Andersen =

Stig Andersen may refer to:

- Stig Andersen (philatelist), Danish philatelist
- Stig Fogh Andersen, Danish operatic tenor

== See also ==
- Stig Anderson, Swedish music manager, lyricist and music publisher
- Stig Andersson (disambiguation)
