= Robert Raymond (disambiguation) =

Robert Raymond (1922–2003) was an Australian producer, director and writer.

Robert Raymond may also refer to:

- Robert Raymond (cyclist) (born 1930), Belgian cyclist
- Robert Raymond, 1st Baron Raymond (1673–1733), British judge
- Bobby Raymond (born 1985), Canadian ice hockey defenceman
- Walter Siegmeister (1903–1965), esoteric writer, used Robert Raymond as a pseudonym
