= Fernando Marroquin =

Fernando Marroquin may refer to:

- Fernando Marroquin (swimmer) (born 1968), Guatemalan swimmer
- Fernando Marroquin (cyclist) (born 1919), Guatemalan cyclist
