= Attrill =

Attrill is a surname, common in the South of England. Notable people with the surname include:

- Edwin Kemp Attrill, Australian theatre artist and activist
- Louis Attrill (born 1975), British rower and Olympic gold medalist
- Peter Attrill (born 1929), Australian sailor
- William Attrill (1868–1939), French cricketer
