= Meshkov =

Meshkov may refer to:

- Meshkov (surname)
- HC Meshkov Brest, a handball club from Brest, Belarus
- Richtmyer–Meshkov instability in fluids
