= Armando Castillo =

Armando Castillo may refer to:

- Armando Castillo (cyclist) (1932–2006), Guatemalan cyclist
- Armando Castillo (politician) (born 1965), Guatemalan businessman and politician
