= Thomas Shardelow =

South African cyclist (1931–2019)

Tommy Shardelow
Personal information
- Full name: Thomas Frederick Shardelow
- Born: 11 November 1931 Durban, South Africa
- Died: 3 July 2019 (aged 87) Cape Town, South Africa

Cycling career
- Sport: Cycling
Medal record
Men's cycling
Representing South Africa
Olympic Games
Silver medal – second place	1952 Helsinki	4,000 m team pursuit
Silver medal – second place	1952 Helsinki	2,000 m tandem
British Empire & Commonwealth Games
Bronze medal – third place	1954 Vancouver	1000 m match sprint

Thomas Frederick Shardelow (11 November 1931 – 3 July 2019) was a South African cyclist. He competed at the 1952 and 1956 Summer Olympics. At the 1952 Olympics, he won silver medals in the 4,000 metres team pursuit and 2,000 metres tandem events.
