= Jean Hansen =

Danish cyclist

Jean Werner Hansen
Personal information
- Full name: Jean Werner Hansen
- Born: 6 March 1932 Copenhagen, Denmark
- Died: 12 April 1987 (aged 55) Copenhagen, Denmark

Cycling career
- Sport: Cycling
- Discipline: Track
- Role: Rider

Jean Hansen (6 March 1932 – 12 April 1987) was a Danish cyclist. He competed in the 4,000 metres team pursuit event at the 1952 Summer Olympics.
