= Hurlstone Park =

- Suburb
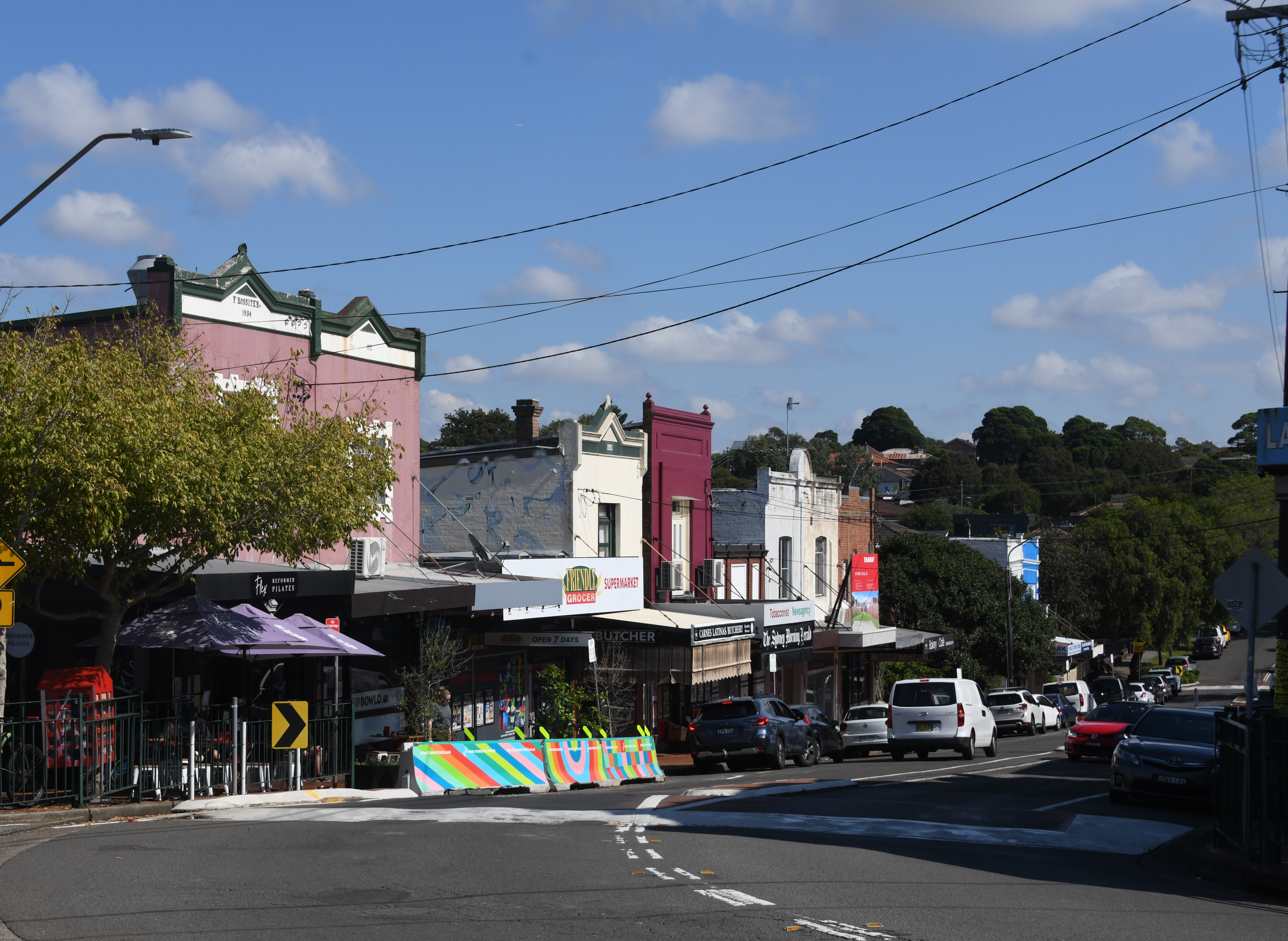
- Crinan Street, Hurlstone Park

- Interactive map of Hurlstone Park
- Coordinates: 33°54′38″S 151°07′45″E
- Country: Australia
- State: New South Wales
- City: Sydney
- LGAs: City of Canterbury-Bankstown; Inner West Council
- Location: 9 km (5.6 mi) south-west of Sydney CBD

Government
  - State electorate: Canterbury
  - Federal division: Grayndler

Area
  - Total: 1.20 km^{2} (0.46 sq mi)
- Elevation: 23 m (75 ft)

Population
  - Total: 5,001 (2021 census)
  - Density: 4,168/km^{2} (10,790/sq mi)
- Postcode: 2193
Suburbs around Hurlstone Park
Ashfield	Summer Hill	Dulwich Hill
Ashbury	Hurlstone Park	Marrickville
Canterbury	Earlwood	Marrickville South

Hurlstone Park is a suburb in the Inner West of Sydney, New South Wales, Australia. Hurlstone Park is located nine kilometres south-west of the Sydney central business district and is mostly in the local government area of the City of Canterbury-Bankstown, and partly in the Inner West Council. The suburb is bounded by: the Cooks River to the south, Garnet Street to the east, New Canterbury Road to the north, Canterbury Road to the north-west, and Church Street to the west. Hurlstone Park is often called 'Hurlo' by locals or as the Sydney Morning Herald once famously described it's at the 'Paris end' of the Canterbury LGA.

== History ==
Hurlstone Park was first known as 'Wattle Hill' and then 'Fernhill'. After the Postmaster-General's Department refused to open a post office called Fernhill, a 1910 referendum chose the name 'Hurlstone', after the nearby Hurlstone College. John Kinloch founded the college in 1878, on the site of present-day Trinity Grammar School and named it after his mother's maiden name, which was Helen Hurlstone. The college moved to a new site, now known as Hurlstone Agricultural High School. The 'Park' was added at the request of the Railways Department, to avoid confusion with the New South Wales town of Hillston.

== Transport ==
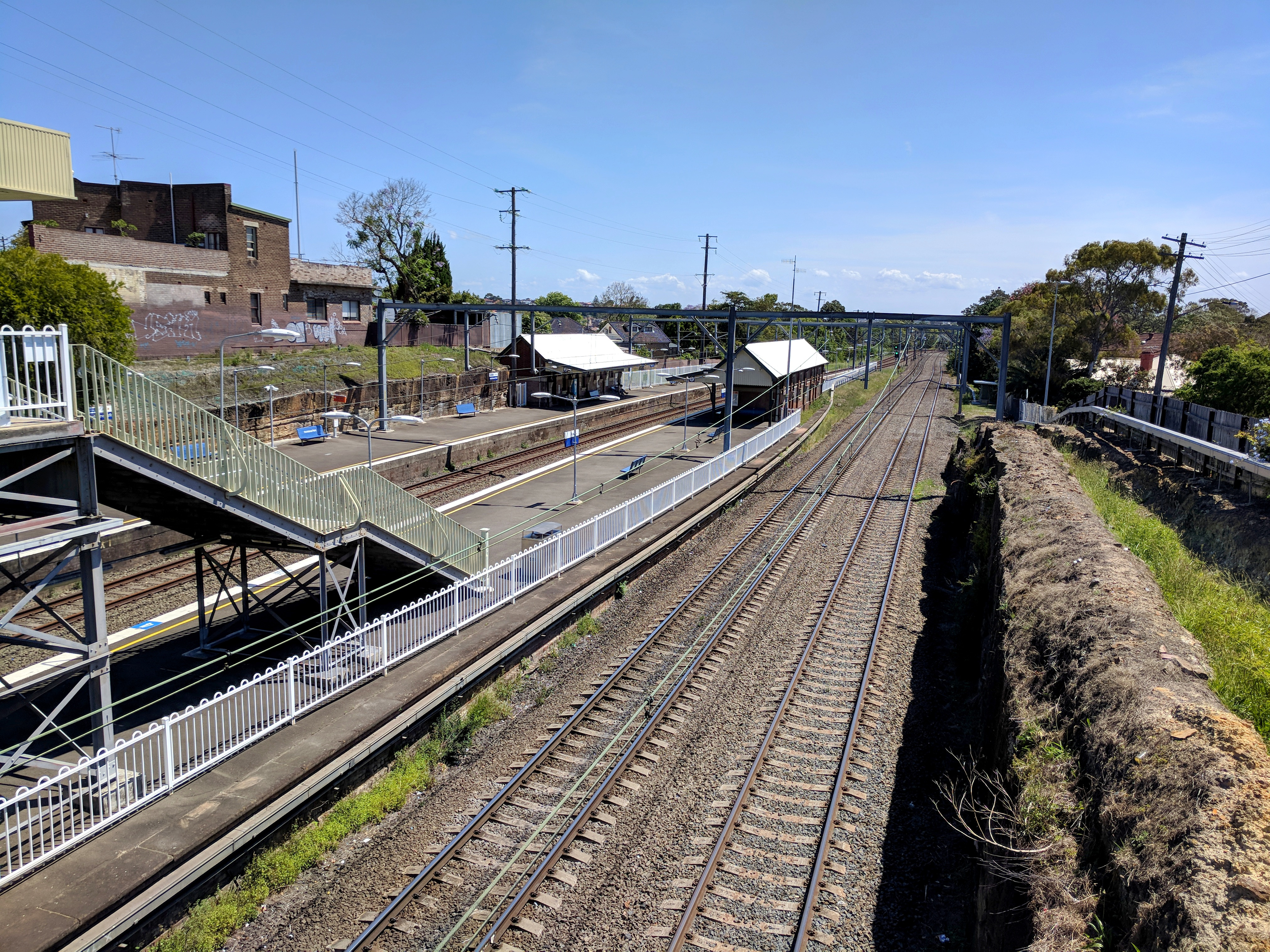
Hurlstone Park railway station

Hurlstone Park railway station was a Sydney Trains station (located 8.8 km from Central station) on the Bankstown line. The station was closed on 30 September 2024 to allow for the line to be converted to Sydney Metro standards; the Metro trains will subsequently serve the rebranded Metro North West & Bankstown Line.

Transit Systems operate the following bus services in Hurlstone Park: 444; 445 (to Balmain East ferry wharf via Dulwich Hill, Petersham Lilyfield, Leichhardt and Rozelle), 428 (to the city via Canterbury, Dulwich Hill, Petersham, Marrickville and Newtown) and L28 routes which run along the Canterbury Road and New Canterbury Road boundary, and the 418 (to Burwood via Ashfield, and to Bondi Junction via Dulwich Hill, Marrickville, Sydenham, St Peters, Alexandria, Mascot, Rosebery, Eastlakes, Kingsford, Randwick and Queens Park), and 406 (to Five Dock via Ashfield) routes which pass through the suburb (along Crinan Street with a bus stop directly outside the railway station).

== Commercial area ==
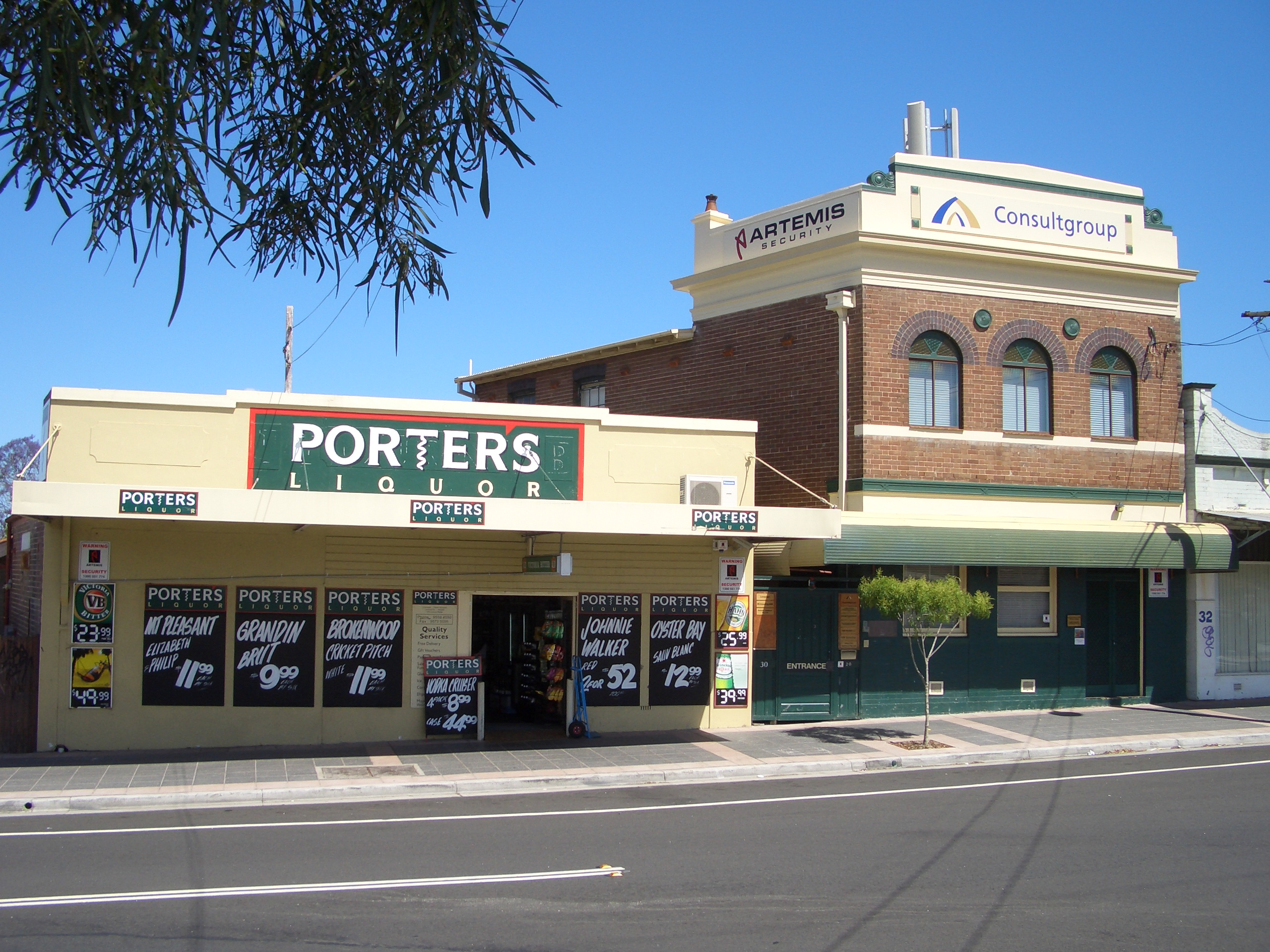
Floss Street, Hurlstone Park

There is a group of shops around Hurlstone Park Station: along Crinan Street, the southern end of Duntroon Street and Floss Street. There are also commercial areas along Canterbury Road and New Canterbury Road. There is an active, local Chamber of Commerce: Canterbury-Hurlstone Park Chamber of Commerce.

The rest of the commercially used land in Hurlstone Park is made up of various shops, ranging from cafes, hairdressers, newsagent, butcher, supermarket, liquor store and a petrol station. Hurlstone Park also has three childcare centres. The Canterbury-Hurlstone Park RSL Club is on the border in Canterbury Rd. The post office opened in 1911.

== Houses ==
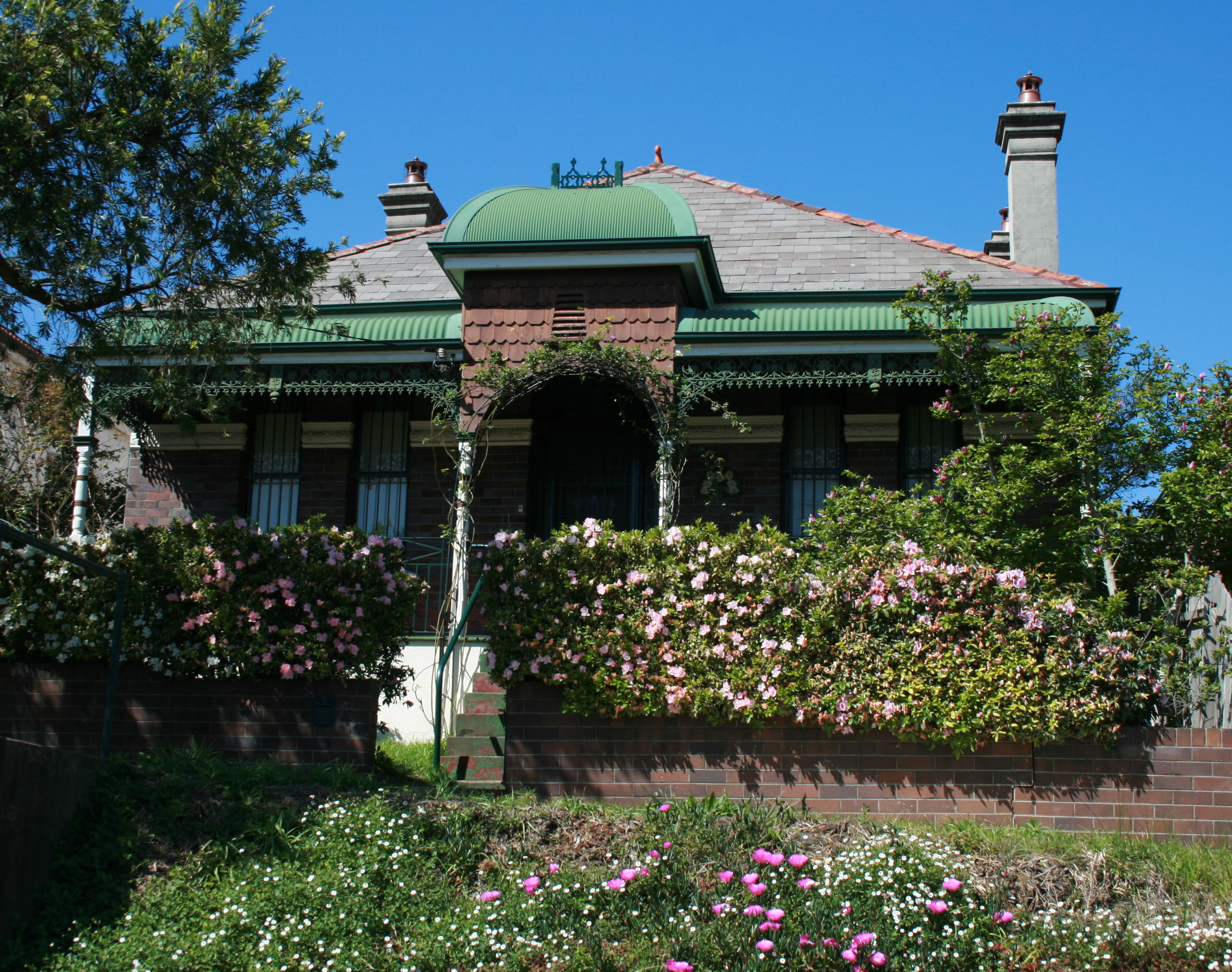
Victorian-era house in Hopetoun St, Hurlstone Park

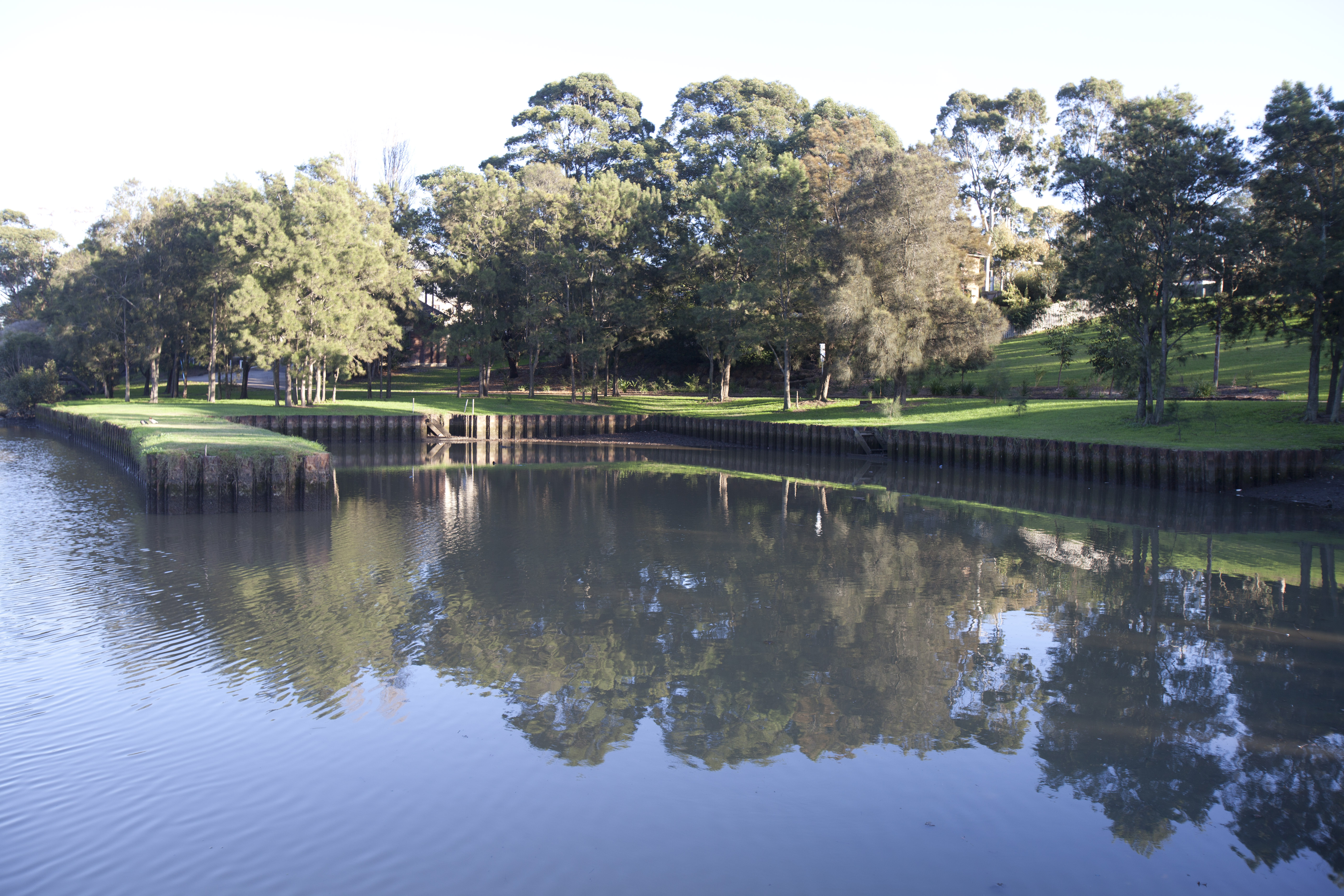
West-ward view of the inlet known as "Boat Harbour".

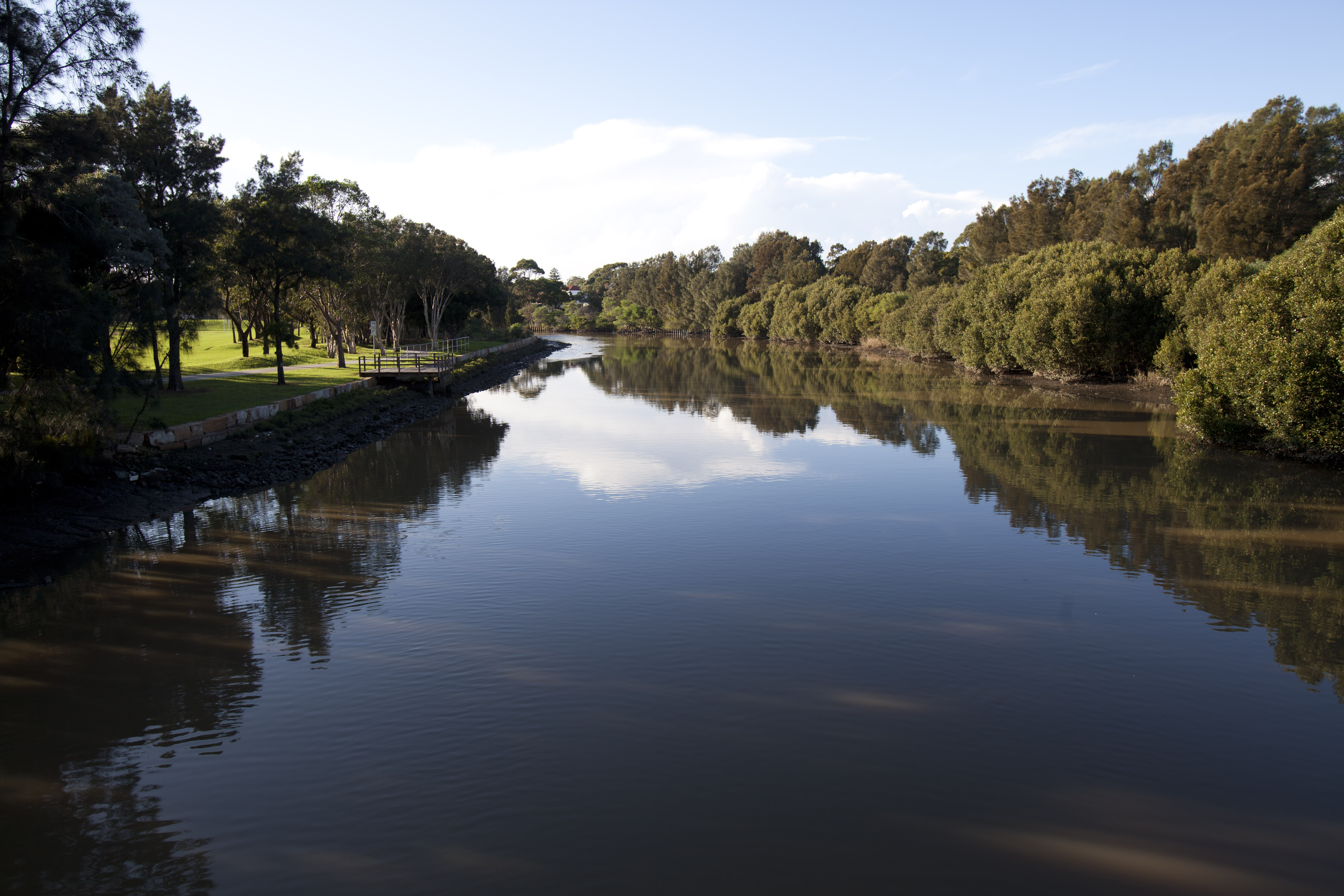
East-ward view of Cooks River taken from the Foord Street footbridge.

Hurlstone Park has a range of period homes. It is generally a low-rise residential area with well-maintained family homes and larger back-yards, with tree-lined streets, and small parks and playgrounds. Older shop façades, some with original features make up the small shopping strip. There is an increasing number of high-rise units in the suburb mostly along Canterbury and New Canterbury Roads.

== Parks and reserves ==
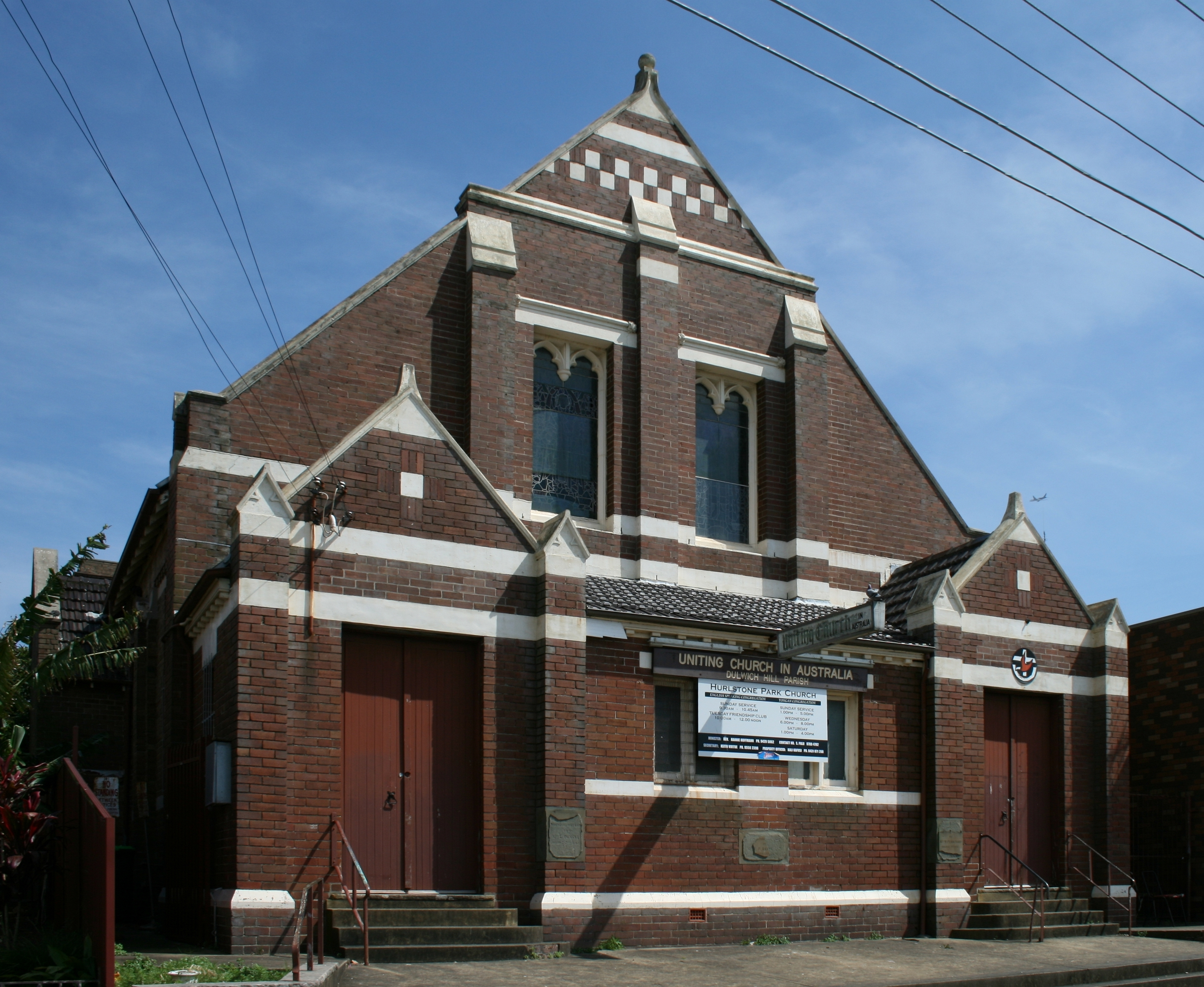
Hurlstone Park Uniting Church

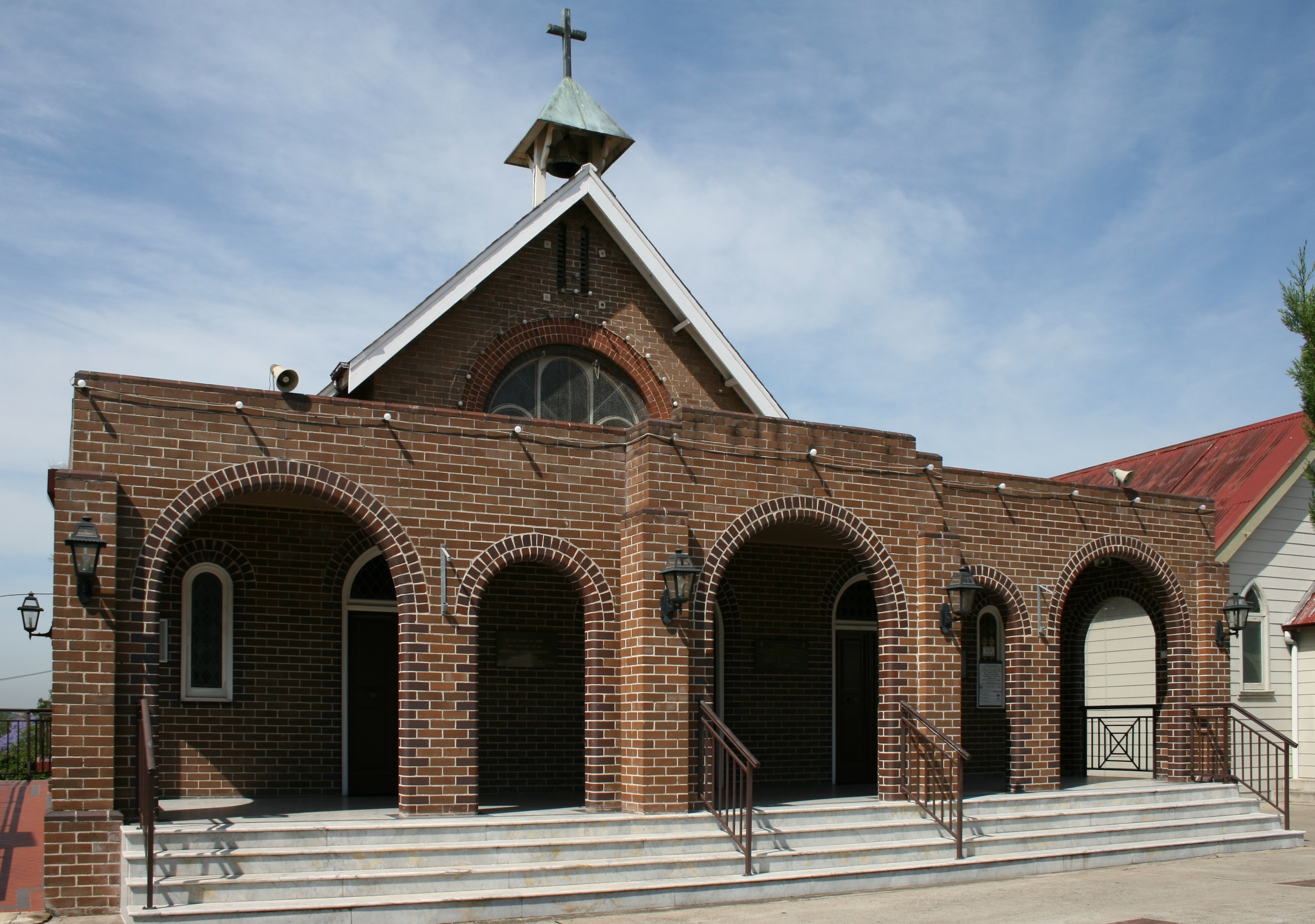
St Stephen Greek Orthodox Church

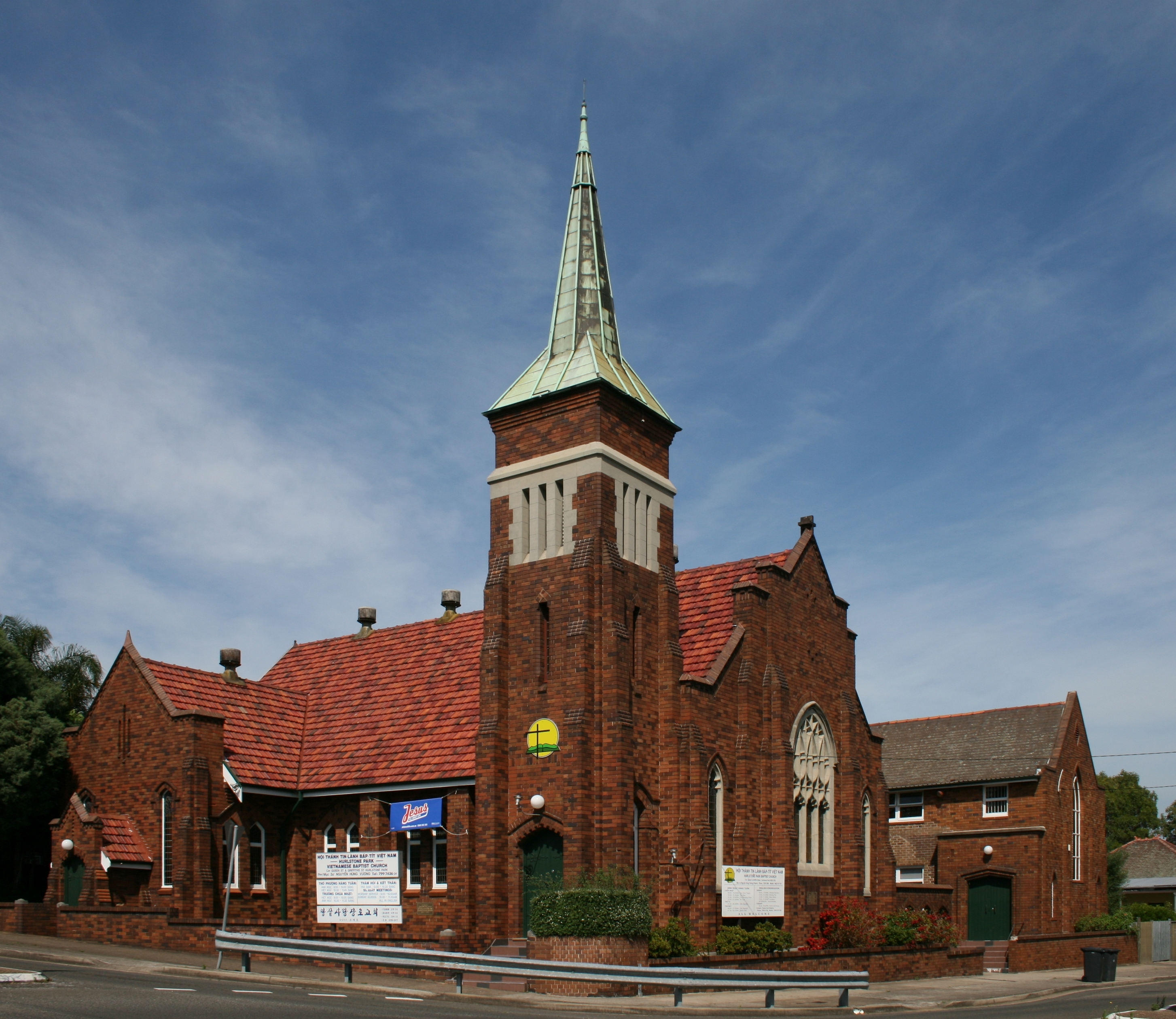
Hurlstone Park Vietnamese Baptist Church

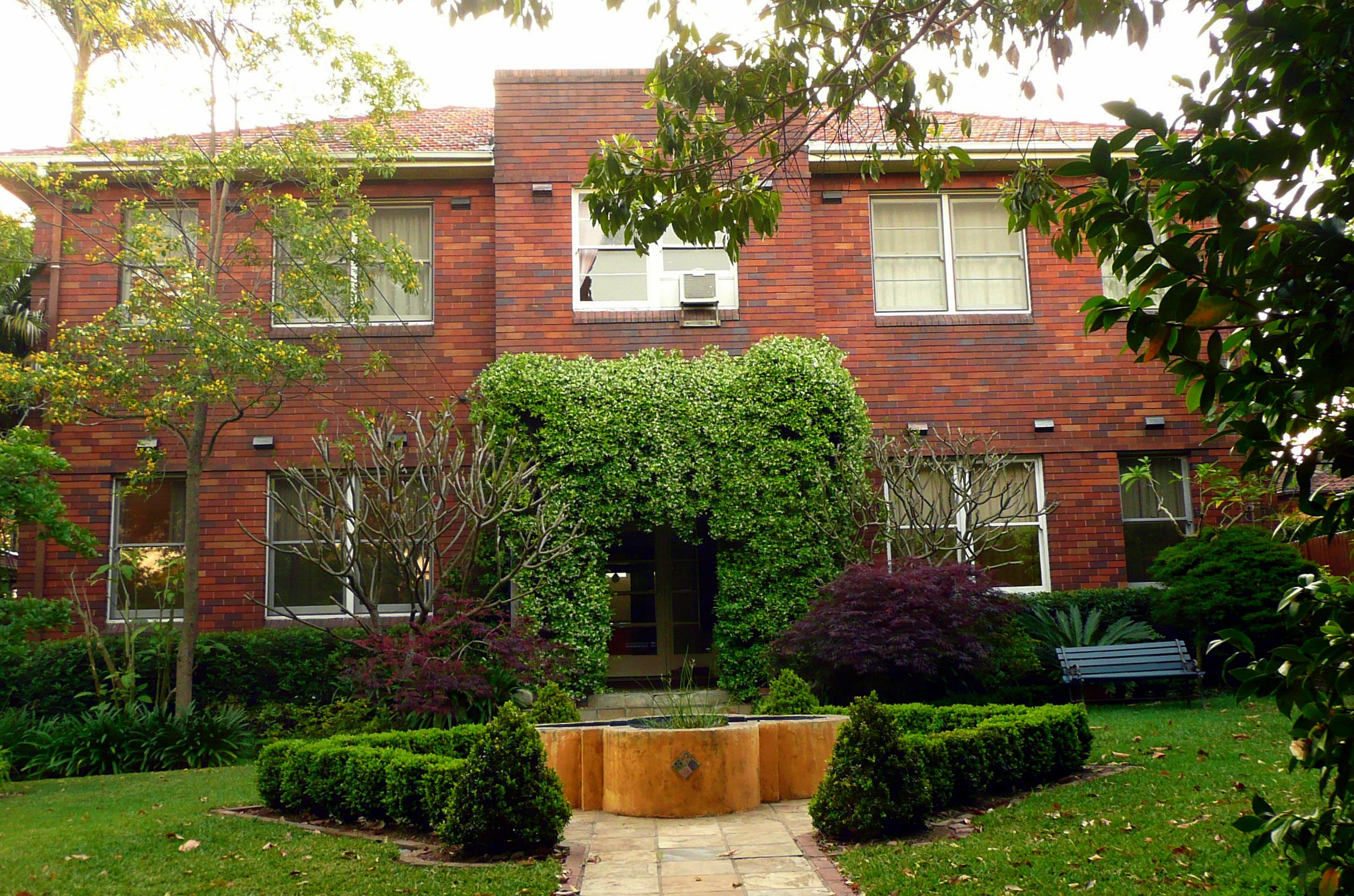
Siddha Yoga Ashram, Garnet Street

Hurlstone Park includes the following parks and reserves:

- Ewen Park. Located along the Cooks River (in the middle of the southern end of the suburb). It is the largest individual park in the suburb and contains two playing fields that are home to the Hurlstone Park Wanderers soccer club. The fields in Ewen park are also used for cricket in summer.
- Warwick Reserve. Located at the intersection of Church and Canberra streets in the south-west corner of the suburb.
- Euston Park. Located at the intersection of Euston and Floss streets, the park contains a war memorial.
- Sawyer Reserve. Located at the intersection of Dunstaffenage street and Foord avenue, and at the end of the cul-de-sac of Kilbride St.
- Hurlstone Memorial Reserve. A small reserve located on the site that once was the Hurlstone Park Bowling Club (along Crinan street).
- Burnett Street Reserve. The reserve splits Burnett street into two sections.
- Joe Poole Reserve. A small reserve that joins the end of Barre street with the point where Wallace avenue and Wallace lane meet.
- Moser Reserve. A small reserve on the south side of the railway line in Keir Avenue.
- Fernhill Street Reserve. A small reserve near the northern end of Fernhill street (with lane access to Barton avenue).
- Dunkeld Reserve. A small reserve near the western edge of the suburb (in Dunkeld avenue).
- A small reserve at the intersection of Garnet street and Tennent parade (in the south-east corner of the suburb). Located next to the 14th hole of Marrickville golf course, the unnamed reserve contains a cricket practice net and a practice goal post (for soccer and rugby).
- A small reserve on the corner of Crinan and Melford streets. The unnamed reserve is a small grassed area that was opened to the public following the demolition of a single house.
- A green belt along the entire southern border of the suburb. The belt follows the Cooks River and encompasses Ewen park. The Botany Bay cycle way extends for 23 km (with Hurlstone Park being approximately one third of the way from Botany Bay to Ryde). The western part of the belt contains a constructed rectangular inlet of water named Boat Harbour. The eastern part of the belt constitutes part of the 13th and 14th holes of Marrickville Golf Course. There are three-foot bridges that cross the Cooks River to the south of the belt: One bridge crosses from the end of Sugar House Road (off Hutton Street), a second bridge crosses from the end of Foord Avenue, and the third bridge crosses near the intersection of Tennent Parade and Burnett Street.

== Churches and religion ==
According to the 2021 census, the top responses for religious affiliation in Hurlstone Park were No Religion 40.4%, Catholic 26.5%, Eastern Orthodox 10.9%, Anglican 4.4% and Not stated 3.6%.

The suburb contains the following religious establishments:

- St Stephen Greek Orthodox Archdiocese of Australia. Located at 650 New Canterbury road.
- Hurlstone Park Uniting Church. Located at 8 Melford street, the church provides services in English and Tongan.
- Siddha Yoga Ashram. Located at 50 Garnet Street.
- Hurlstone Park Vietnamese Baptist Church. Located at the corner of Queen and Griffiths streets, on the border of Hurlstone Park and the neighbouring suburb of Ashfield.

== Schools ==
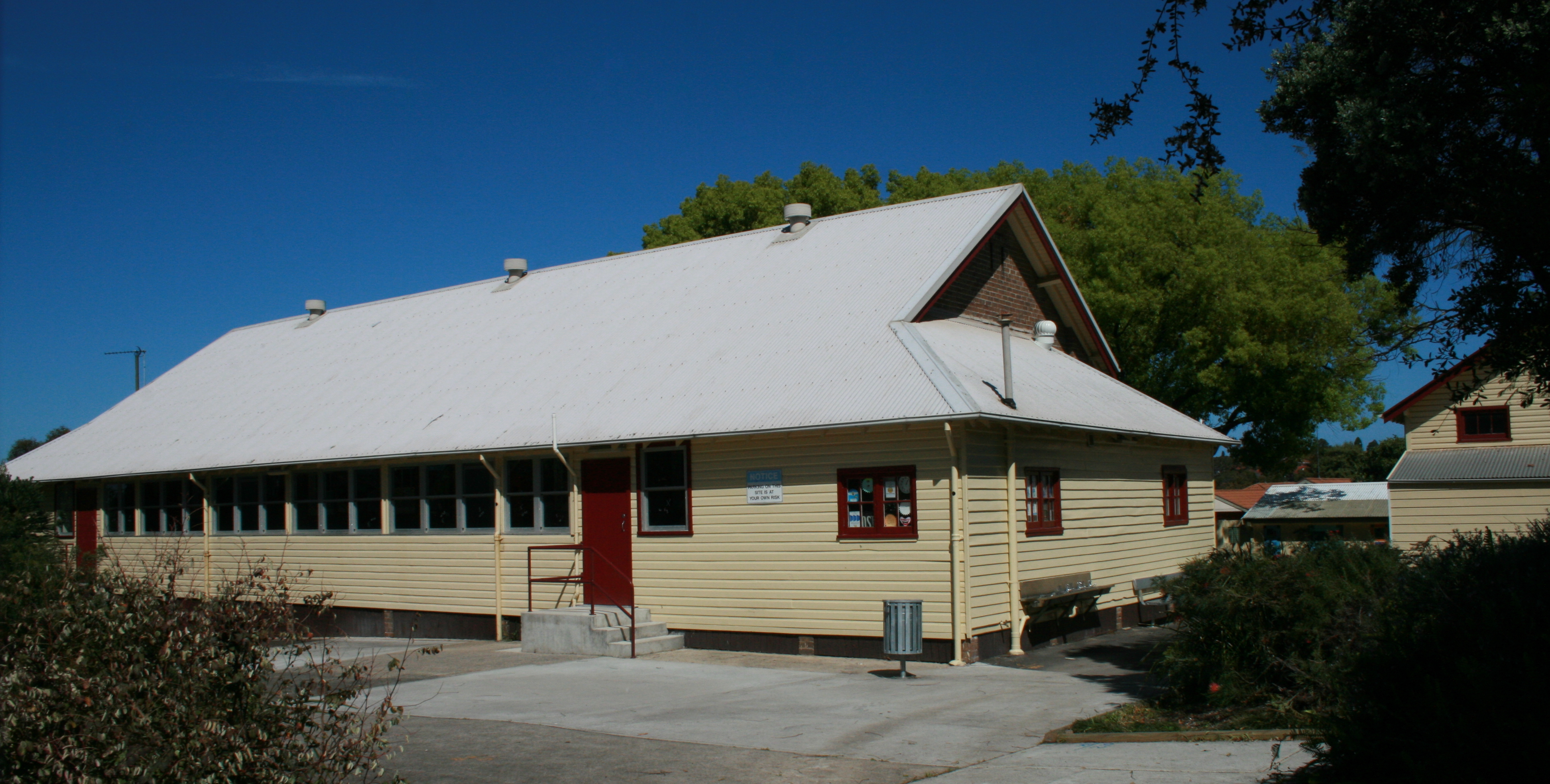
The Edgeware School

Only one school is located in Hurlstone Park. The Edgeware School is an alternative Department of Education facility, mainly for year 9 to 12 students who have been unsuccessful in mainstream schools. It is located in Burnett street (just off Tennent parade).

== Demographics ==
At the 2021 census, there were 5,001 residents in Hurlstone Park.

- 60.4% of people were born in Australia. The next most common countries of birth were Greece 4.2%, England 3.0%, China 2.7%, Lebanon 2.6% and Vietnam 2.2%.
- 59.8% of people spoke only English at home. Other languages spoken at home included Greek 8.0%, Arabic 5.1%, Mandarin 2.8%, Italian 2.8% and Portuguese 2.7%.
- The most common ancestries were English 22.6%, Australian 21.8%, Irish 11.5%, Greek 10.4% and Scottish 8.1%.

== Notable people ==
- Jock Gibson, fencer
- Justine Schofield, chef & TV personality
- Jock Livingston, cricketer
- Annabel Crabb, journalist & commentator
- Paul Osborne, former rugby league player and politician
