= Henning Larsen (cyclist, born 1931) =

Danish cyclist (1931–2009)

Henning R. Larsen
Personal information
- Full name: Henning Robert Larsen
- Born: 9 April 1931 Copenhagen, Denmark
- Died: 28 April 2009 (aged 78)

Cycling career
- Sport: Cycling
- Discipline: Track
- Role: Rider

Henning R. Larsen (9 April 1931 – 28 April 2009) was a Danish cyclist. He competed in the 4,000 metres team pursuit event at the 1952 Summer Olympics.
