= Meshkov (surname) =

Meshkov (Russian: Мешков, from мешок meaning a bag) is a Russian masculine surname. Its feminine counterpart is Meshkova. The name Meshkov may refer to

- Leonid Meshkov (1916–1986), Soviet swimmer
- Nikita Meshkovs (born 1994), Latvian chess grandmaster
- Sydney Meshkov (1927–2020), American theoretical physicist
- Valery Meshkov (born 1945), Soviet figure skater
- Viktor Meshkov (born 1926), Soviet cyclist
- Vitali Meshkov (born 1983), Russian football referee
- Yuriy Meshkov (1945-2019), Crimean politician
