= Arne Johansson =

Arne Johansson may refer to:

- Arne Johansson (cyclist) (1927–2018), Swedish cyclist
- Arne Johansson (ice hockey) (1915–1956), Swedish ice hockey player
- Arne Johansson (orienteer), Swedish orienteer
