= Owe Nordqvist =

Swedish cyclist

Personal information
- Born: 23 September 1927 Stockholm, Sweden
- Died: 26 August 2015 (aged 87)

Cycling career
- Sport: Cycling

Owe Nordqvist (23 September 1927 – 26 August 2015) was a Swedish cyclist. He competed in the 4,000 metres team pursuit at the 1952 Summer Olympics.
