= Stig Andersson =

Stig Andersson may refer to:

- Stig Andersson (canoeist) (1927–2016), Swedish sprint canoer
- Stig Andersson (cyclist) (1924–2015), Swedish cyclist
- Stig Andersson (ice hockey) (1914–2000), Swedish ice hockey player
- Stig Lennart Andersson (born 1957), Danish landscape architect
- Stig Anderson (1931–1997), manager of the pop group ABBA
- Stig Andersson-Tvilling (1928–1989), Swedish ice hockey player and footballer
