= Bengt Fröbom =

Swedish cyclist (1926–2012)

Personal information
- Born: 12 December 1926 Stockholm, Sweden
- Died: 8 June 2012 (aged 85) Finspång, Sweden

Cycling career
- Sport: Cycling

Bengt Fröbom (12 December 1926 – 8 June 2012) was a Swedish cyclist. He competed in the 4,000 metres team pursuit at the 1952 Summer Olympics.
