= Jean-Marie Joubert =

French cyclist

Personal information
- Born: 9 May 1932 Saint-Thomas-de-Conac, France
- Died: 22 August 2014 (aged 82) Jonzac, France

Cycling career
- Sport: Cycling
- Disciplines: Road; Track
- Role: Rider

Amateur teams
- 1948–1954: ACBB
- 1960–1962: ACBB
- 1963–1971: Royan Océan Club

Professional teams
- 1955: Alcyon–Dunlop
- 1956: Essor–Leroux–Hutchinson
- 1957: Helyett–Potin
- 1958: Individual
- 1959: UNCP

Jean-Marie Joubert (9 May 1932 – 22 August 2014) was a French cyclist. He competed in the 4,000 metres team pursuit event at the 1952 Summer Olympics.
