= Juan Montoya (cyclist) =

Guatemalan cyclist

Personal information
- Born: 22 November 1932 (age 93)

Cycling career
- Sport: Cycling

Juan Montoya (born 22 November 1932) is a Guatemalan cyclist. He competed in the 4,000 metres team pursuit at the 1952 Summer Olympics.
