= Mino De Rossi =

Italian cyclist (1931–2022)

Personal information
- Full name: Mino De Rossi
- Born: 21 May 1931 Arquata Scrivia, Italy
- Died: 7 January 2022 (aged 90) Genoa, Italy

Cycling career
- Sport: Cycling
- Disciplines: Road and track
- Role: Rider

Professional teams
- 1952–1954: Bianchi–Pirelli
- 1955: Leo–Chlorodont
- 1956: Fréjus–Superga
- 1957: Ignis–Doniselli
- 1958: Asborno–Frejus
- 1961: Fides
- 1962–1967: Ignis–Moschettieri
Medal record
Representing Italy
Men's cycling
Olympic Games
Gold medal – first place	1952 Helsinki	4.000m Team Pursuit

Mino De Rossi (21 May 1931 – 7 January 2022) was an Italian road and track cyclist, who won the gold medal in the men's 4.000m team pursuit at the 1952 Summer Olympics, alongside Marino Morettini, Loris Campana and Guido Messina. He was a professional road cyclist from 1952 to 1968. De Rossi died on 7 January 2022, at the age of 90.

== Major results ==
=== Track ===
1951
1st Individual pursuit, UCI Amateur Track World Championships
1952
1st Team pursuit, Summer Olympics
2nd Individual pursuit, UCI Amateur Track World Championships
1959
1st Six Days of Buenos Aires (with Jorge Bátiz)
1963
1st Six Days of Montreal (with Ferdinando Terruzzi)

=== Road ===
1952
2nd Piccolo Giro di Lombardia
1953
10th Giro di Lombardia
1954
3rd Giro di Lombardia
4th Giro di Romagna
1967
3rd Giro dell'Appennino
