= Urho Sirén =

Finnish cyclist

Urho Siren
Personal information
- Born: 17 June 1932 Helsinki, Finland
- Died: 27 November 2002 (aged 70) Espoo, Finland

Cycling career
- Sport: Cycling

Urho Sirén (17 June 1932 – 27 November 2002) was a Finnish cyclist. He competed in the 4,000 metres team pursuit event at the 1952 Summer Olympics.
