= Claude Brugerolles =

French cyclist

Personal information
- Full name: Claude Brugerolles
- Born: 15 August 1931 Champigny-sur-Marne, France
- Died: 21 November 1978 (aged 47) Pithiviers, France

Cycling career
- Sport: Cycling

Claude Brugerolles (15 August 1931 – 21 November 1978) was a French cyclist. He competed in the 4,000 metres team pursuit event at the 1952 Summer Olympics.
