= István Pásztor (cyclist) =

Hungarian cyclist

Personal information
- Born: 2 January 1926 Budapest, Hungary
- Died: 2 January 2015 (aged 89)

Cycling career
- Sport: Cycling

István Pásztor (2 January 1926 – 2 January 2015) was a Hungarian cyclist. He competed in the 4,000 metres team pursuit at the 1952 Summer Olympics.
