= Vasily Fedin =

Personal information
- Born: 18 June 1926
- Died: 6 February 2005 (aged 78)

Cycling career
- Sport: Cycling

Vasily Fedin (18 June 1926 – 6 February 2005) was a Soviet cyclist. He competed in the 4,000 metres team pursuit event at the 1952 Summer Olympics.
