= Tarit Kumar Sett =

Indian cyclist

Personal information
- Born: 15 January 1931 India
- Died: 29 January 2014 (aged 83) Kolkata, India

Cycling career
- Sport: Cycling

Tarit Kumar Sett (15 January 1931 – 29 January 2014) was an Indian cyclist. He competed in the 4,000 metres team pursuit at the 1952 Summer Olympics in Helsinki. Sett died at a nursing home in South Kolkata following a long illness, as reported by the West Bengal Cyclists Association.
