= Valentin Mikhaylov =

Soviet cyclist

Valentin Nikolayevich Mikhaylov
Personal information
- Born: 5 December 1929 Moscow, Russia

Cycling career
- Sport: Cycling

Valentin Mikhaylov (born 5 December 1929) is a Soviet cyclist. He competed in the 4,000 metres team pursuit event at the 1952 Summer Olympics.
