= Antonio Prior =

Spanish cyclist (1913–1961)

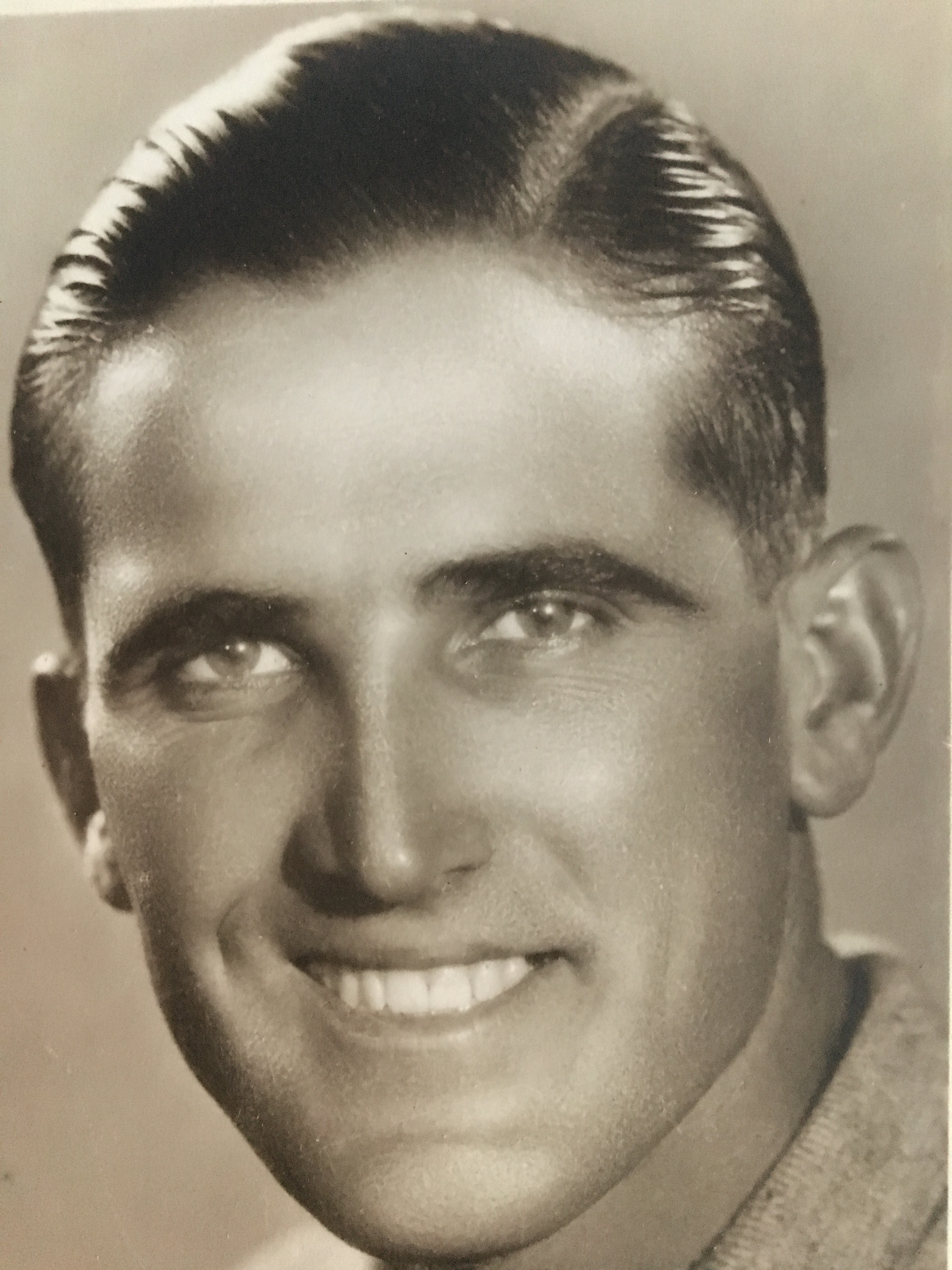

Personal information
- Born: 12 August 1913 Torreagüera, Murcia, Spain
- Died: 11 July 1961 (aged 47) Narbonne, France

Cycling career
- Sport: Cycling
- Discipline: Road
- Role: Rider

Professional teams
- 1933: Individual
- 1934–1935: GAC
- 1936–1943: Individual

Antonio Prior (12 August 1913 – 11 July 1961) was a Spanish racing cyclist. In 1949, he became a citizen of France. He rode in three editions of the Tour de France.

== Major results ==
1933
6th Overall Vuelta a la Comunidad Valenciana
1936
1st Trofeo Masferrer
1st Six Days of Buenos Aires (with Rafael Ramos)
1937
2nd Overall Tour du Maroc

1st Stages 2, 4 & 10

2nd Six Days of Buenos Aires
