= Bent Jørgensen (cyclist) =

Danish cyclist (1923–2004)

Personal information
- Full name: Bent Erik Jørgensen
- Born: 7 May 1923 Syddanmark, Denmark
- Died: 17 June 2004 (aged 81)

Cycling career
- Sport: Cycling

Bent Erik Jørgensen (7 May 1923 – 17 June 2004) was a Danish cyclist. He competed in the 4,000 metres team pursuit event at the 1952 Summer Olympics. Jørgensen died on 17 June 2004, at the age of 81.
