= Jorge Bátiz =

Argentinian bicycle racer (1933–2025)

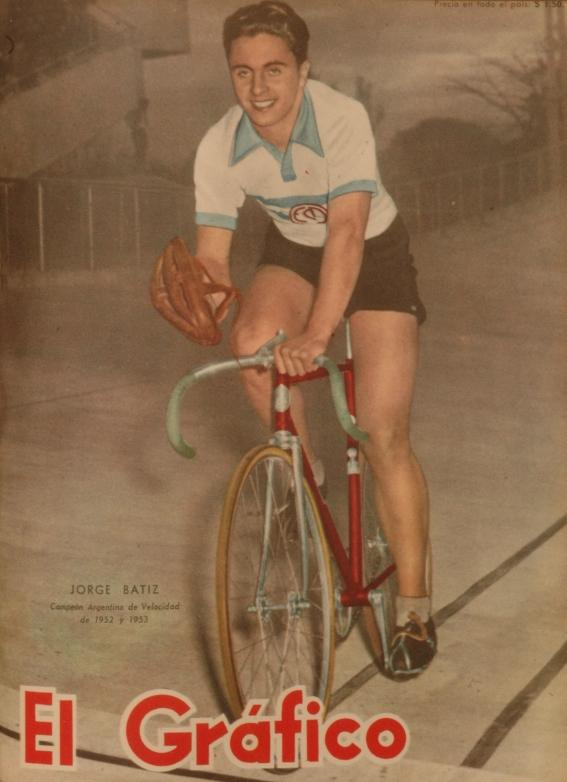
- Bátiz in 1953

Personal information
- Born: 2 December 1933 Tandil, Buenos Aires Province, Argentina
- Died: 19 November 2025 (aged 91)

Cycling career
- Sport: Cycling
- Disciplines: Road; Track
- Role: Rider

Professional teams
- 1958: Ghigi–Coppi
- 1959: Tricofilina–Coppi
- 1960–1964: Individual

Jorge Bátiz (2 December 1933 – 19 November 2025) was an Argentinian cyclist, who competed primarily in track cycling but also occasionally on the road. Professional from 1958 to 1965, he won the Six Days of Buenos Aires five times.

Bátiz died on 19 November 2025, at the age of 91.

== Major results ==
1955
1st Sprint, Pan American Games
2nd Sprint, UCI Amateur Track World Championships
1956
2nd Sprint, UCI Amateur Track World Championships
1958
1st Six Days of Buenos Aires (with Fausto Coppi)
1959
1st Six Days of Buenos Aires (with Mino De Rossi)
1960
2nd Six Days of Buenos Aires
1961
1st Six Days of Buenos Aires (with Miguel Poblet)
2nd Six Days of Madrid
1963
1st Six Days of Buenos Aires (with Ricardo Senn)
2nd Six Days of Madrid
1964
1st Six Days of Buenos Aires (with Ricardo Senn)
