= Dimitar Bobchev =

Bulgarian cyclist

Personal information
- Born: 20 September 1926
- Died: 12 March 2015 (aged 88)

Cycling career
- Sport: Cycling

Dimitar Bobchev (Bulgarian: Димитър Бобчев, 20 September 1926 – 12 March 2015) was a Bulgarian cyclist. He competed in the 4,000 metres team pursuit at the 1952 Summer Olympics.
