= Heinrich Müller (cyclist) =

Swiss cyclist 1926–1997

Personal information
- Born: 14 November 1926 Zurich, Switzerland
- Died: 6 January 1997 (aged 70) Biel/Bienne, Switzerland

Cycling career
- Sport: Cycling

Heinrich Müller (14 November 1926 – 6 January 1997) was a Swiss cyclist. He competed in the 4,000 metres team pursuit event at the 1952 Summer Olympics.
