= José Pauwels =

Belgian cyclist

Personal information
- Full name: José Pauwels
- Born: 24 June 1928 Sint-Niklaas, Belgium
- Died: 7 July 2012 (aged 84) Sint-Gillis-Waas, Belgium

Cycling career
- Sport: Cycling

José Pauwels (24 June 1928 – 7 July 2012) was a Belgian cyclist. He competed in the 4,000 metres team pursuit event at the 1952 Summer Olympics.
