= Preben Lundgren Kristensen =

Danish cyclist

Personal information
- Born: 28 November 1923 Hovedstaden, Denmark
- Died: 17 May 1986 (aged 62) Hovedstaden, Denmark

Cycling career
- Sport: Cycling

Preben Lundgren Kristensen (28 November 1923 – 17 May 1986) was a Danish cyclist. He competed in the 4,000 metres team pursuit event at the 1952 Summer Olympics.
