= Carlos Sandoval (cyclist) =

Guatemalan cyclist (1928–1988)

Personal information
- Full name: Carlos Ernesto Sandoval
- Born: 21 January 1928 Retalhuleu, Guatemala
- Died: 11 November 1988 (aged 60) Guatemala City, Guatemala

Cycling career
- Sport: Cycling

Carlos Ernesto Sandoval (21 January 1928 – 11 November 1988) was a Guatemalan cyclist. He competed in the 4,000 metres team pursuit at the 1952 Summer Olympics. Sandoval died in Guatemala City on 11 November 1988, at the age of 60.
