= Arne Johansson (cyclist) =

Swedish cyclist (1927–2018)

Personal information
- Born: 4 March 1927 Stockholm, Sweden
- Died: 16 August 2018 (aged 91)

Cycling career
- Sport: Cycling

Arne Johansson (4 March 1927 – 16 August 2018) was a Swedish cyclist. He competed in the 4,000 metres team pursuit at the 1952 Summer Olympics.
