= Arne Johansen (footballer) =

Norwegian footballer (1902–1984)

Personal information
- Date of birth: 22 May 1902
- Date of death: 21 December 1984 (aged 82)

International career
Years	Team	Apps	(Gls)
1925	Norway	1	(0)

Arne Johansen (22 May 1902 – 21 December 1984) was a Norwegian footballer. He played in one match for the Norway national football team in 1925.
