= Robert Raymond (cyclist) =

Belgian cyclist

Personal information
- Full name: Robert Raymond
- Born: 14 April 1930 Jambes, Belgium

Cycling career
- Sport: Cycling

Robert Raymond (born 14 April 1930) is a Belgian former cyclist. He competed in the 4,000 metres team pursuit event at the 1952 Summer Olympics.
