= Alan Newton (cyclist) =

British cyclist (1931–2023)

Personal information
- Born: 19 March 1931 Stockport, England
- Died: 22 May 2023 (aged 92)

Cycling career
- Sport: Cycling
- Discipline: Track
- Role: Rider

Amateur team
- 1946–: Manchester Wheelers' Club
Medal record
Men's cycling
Representing Great Britain
Olympic Games
Bronze medal – third place	1952 Helsinki	Team pursuit

Alan Newton (19 March 1931 – 22 May 2023) was a British track cyclist. Born in Stockport, Cheshire, Newton began cycling in 1946, with the Manchester Wheelers' Club. He represented his native country at the 1952 Summer Olympics in Helsinki, Finland. There he won the bronze medal in the men's 4,000 metres team pursuit, alongside Donald Burgess, George Newberry, and Ronald Stretton. He also competed at the UCI Track Cycling World Championships where they finished 4th.

Newton was completing an apprenticeship to become an electrician at the time he was competing, and said the training consisted of 40 hours a week, riding his bike with a toolkit on his back. An off-road cycling route from Marple to Stockport, the Alan Newton Way, is named in his honour.

Newton died on 22 May 2023, at the age of 92.
