= Frank Jordan (water polo) =

Water polo player

Personal information
- Born: 19 August 1932
- Died: 13 March 2012 (aged 79)

Sport
- Sport: Water polo

Frank Jordan (19 August 1932 – 13 March 2012) was an Australian water polo player. He competed at the 1952 Summer Olympics.
