= Ronald Stretton =

British cyclist (1930–2012)

Personal information
- Full name: Ronald Charles Stretton
- Born: 13 February 1930 Epsom, Surrey, England
- Died: 12 November 2012 (aged 82) Toronto, Ontario, Canada

Cycling career
- Sport: Cycling
- Discipline: Track
- Role: Rider
Medal record
Men's track cycling
Representing Great Britain
Olympic Games
Bronze medal – third place	1952 Helsinki	Team pursuit

Ronald Charles "Ron" Stretton (13 February 1930 – 12 November 2012) was a track cyclist from Great Britain, who represented his native country at the 1952 Summer Olympics in Helsinki, Finland. There he won the bronze medal in the men's 4,000 metres team pursuit, alongside Donald Burgess, George Newberry, and Alan Newton. He was born in Epsom, Surrey and died in Toronto, Ontario, Canada.
