= Fernando Marroquin (cyclist) =

Guatemalan cyclist

Personal information
- Born: 1919

Cycling career
- Sport: Cycling

Fernando Marroquin (born 1919, date of death unknown) was a Guatemalan cyclist. He competed in the 4,000 metres team pursuit at the 1952 Summer Olympics.
