= Robert Fowler (cyclist) =

South African cyclist (1931–2001)

Personal information
- Born: 5 December 1931 Krugersdorp, South Africa
- Died: 27 December 2001 (aged 70) Johannesburg, South Africa

Cycling career
- Sport: Cycling
Medal record
Men's cycling
Representing South Africa
Olympic Games
Silver medal – second place	1952 Helsinki	4,000m Team Pursuit

Robert Fowler (7 April 1931 – 27 December 2001) was a South African cyclist. He competed at the 1952, 1956 and 1960 Summer Olympics. At the 1952 Olympics, he won a silver medal in the 4,000 metres team pursuit event.
