= George Estman =

South African cyclist (1922–2006)

Personal information
- Full name: George Anders Estman
- Born: 8 September 1922
- Died: 16 September 2006 (aged 84) Alberton, Gauteng, South Africa

Cycling career
- Sport: Cycling
Medal record
Men's cycling
Representing South Africa
Olympic Games
Silver medal – second place	1952 Helsinki	4,000m Team Pursuit

George Anders Estman (8 September 1922 – 16 September 2006) was a South African cyclist. He competed at the 1948 and 1952 Summer Olympics. At the 1952 Olympics, he won a silver medal in the 4,000 metres team pursuit event.
