= Patricia Norford =

Australian fencer (1932–2024)

Personal information
- Full name: Patricia Mary Norford
- Born: 28 January 1932 Parramatta, Australia
- Died: 28 December 2024 (aged 92)

Sport
- Sport: Fencing

Patricia Norford (28 January 1932 – 28 December 2024) was an Australian fencer. She competed in the women's individual foil event at the 1952 Summer Olympics. Norford died on 28 December 2024, at the age of 92.
