= Mario Mathieu =

Argentine cyclist

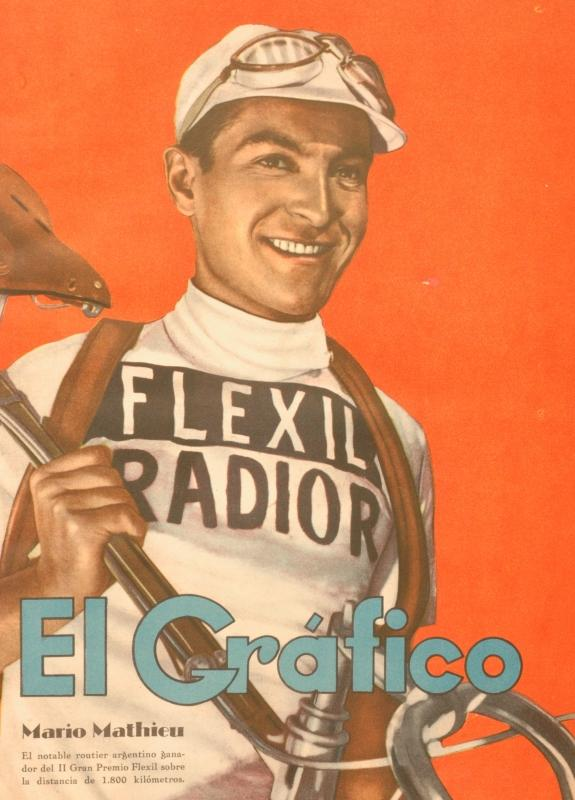

Personal information
- Born: 19 January 1917 Paraná, Entre Ríos, Argentina
- Died: 24 November 1999 (aged 82) Paraná, Entre Ríos, Argentina

Cycling career
- Sport: Cycling

Mario Mathieu (19 January 1917 – 24 November 1999) was an Argentine cyclist. He competed in the individual and team road race events at the 1948 Summer Olympics.
