= Viktor Meshkov =

Soviet cyclist (born 1926)

Personal information
- Born: 1926

Cycling career
- Sport: Cycling

Viktor Meshkov (born 1926) is a Soviet cyclist. He competed in the 4,000 metres team pursuit event at the 1952 Summer Olympics.
