= George Newberry =

British cyclist (1917–1978)

Personal information
- Full name: George Albert Newberry
- Born: 6 March 1917 Burton on Trent, United Kingdom
- Died: 29 December 1978 (aged 61)

Cycling career
- Sport: Cycling
- Discipline: Track
- Role: Rider
Medal record
Men's track cycling
Representing Great Britain
Olympic Games
Bronze medal – third place	1952 Helsinki	Team pursuit

George Albert Newberry (6 March 1917 – 29 December 1978) was a track cyclist from Great Britain.

Newberry was born in the Burton on Trent area of Staffordshire. He represented his country at the 1952 Summer Olympics in Helsinki, Finland. There he won the bronze medal in the 4.000m team pursuit, alongside Donald Burgess, Alan Newton, and Ronald Stretton.
