= Jock Gibson =

Australian fencer

Personal information
- Born: 25 March 1921 Hurlstone Park, New South Wales, Australia
- Died: 4 December 1994 (aged 73)

Sport
- Sport: Fencing

John Henry Gibson (25 March 1921 – 4 December 1994) was an Australian épée, foil and sabre fencer. He competed in five events at the 1952 Summer Olympics.
