= Donald Burgess =

British cyclist (born 1933)

Personal information
- Full name: Donald Christopher Burgess
- Born: 8 February 1933 (age 93) Hendon, London

Cycling career
- Sport: Cycling
- Discipline: Track
- Role: Rider
Medal record
Men's cycling
Representing Great Britain
Olympic Games
Bronze medal – third place	1952 Helsinki	Team pursuit
Bronze medal – third place	1956 Melbourne	Team pursuit

Donald Christopher "Don" Burgess (born 8 February 1933) is a retired track cyclist from Great Britain, who represented his native country at the 1952 Summer Olympics in Helsinki, Finland. There he won the bronze medal in the men's 4,000 metres team pursuit, alongside Alan Newton, George Newberry, and Ronald Stretton. Burgess also competed at the 1956 Summer Olympics in Melbourne, Australia, and once again won bronze.
