= Stig Andersson (cyclist) =

Swedish cyclist

Personal information
- Born: 10 November 1924 Halland, Sweden
- Died: 11 July 2015 (aged 90)

Cycling career
- Sport: Cycling

Stig Andersson (10 November 1924 – 11 July 2015) was a Swedish cyclist. He competed in the 4,000 metres team pursuit at the 1952 Summer Olympics.
