= Armando Castillo (cyclist) =

Guatemalan cyclist (1932–2006)

Personal information
- Born: 20 May 1932
- Died: 2 February 2006 (aged 73)

Cycling career
- Sport: Cycling

Armando Castillo (20 May 1932 – 2 February 2006) was a Guatemalan cyclist. He competed in the 4,000 metres team pursuit at the 1952 Summer Olympics.
