= Alfred Swift =

South African cyclist (1931–2009)

Alfred James Swift
Personal information
- Nickname: Jimmy
- Born: 25 June 1931 Durban, KwaZulu-Natal, South Africa
- Died: 13 April 2009 (aged 77) Johannesburg, South Africa

Cycling career
- Sport: Cycling
Medal record
Men's cycling
Representing South Africa
Olympic Games
Silver medal – second place	1952 Helsinki	4000 m
Bronze medal – third place	1956 Melbourne	1000 m
Commonwealth Games
Gold medal – first place	1954 Vancouver	Time Trial

Alfred James Swift (25 June 1931 – 13 April 2009) was a South African Olympic athlete and cyclist.

Swift was born in Durban, KwaZulu-Natal, South Africa on 25 June 1931. He was awarded provincial colours for Natal (Kwazulu Natal) and then later for Transvaal (Gauteng). He was awarded his springbok colours in 1952 and competed at two Olympic games, 1952 in Helsinki and 1956 in Melbourne. He also captained the South African Team to the 1960 Summer Olympics in Rome.

He won a silver (4,000m Team Pursuit Men 1952) and bronze medal (1,000m Time Trial Men 1956) at the games. He went to two British Empire & Commonwealth Games, 1954 in Vancouver, Canada, and 1958 in Cardiff, Wales. He won gold (Time Trial) at the 1954 British Empire and Commonwealth Games. He was one of only three athletes (of all types) to win South Africa's highest honour, the Shield of Jove.

He gave back to his sport by serving and being president of South African Cycling Federation and was one of the creators of the Rapport Tour (South Africa's Tour de France). Swift died on 13 April 2009 in Johannesburg, South Africa.
