= Loris Campana =

Italian cyclist

Personal information
- Full name: Loris Campana
- Born: 3 August 1926 Marcaria, Italy
- Died: 3 September 2015 (aged 89)

Cycling career
- Sport: Cycling
- Disciplines: Road and track
- Role: Rider
Medal record
Representing Italy
Men's track cycling
Olympic Games
Gold medal – first place	1952 Helsinki	4.000m Team Pursuit

Loris Campana (3 August 1926–3 September 2015) was an Italian road and track cyclist who won the gold medal in the men's 4000m team pursuit at the 1952 Summer Olympics, alongside Marino Morettini, Mino de Rossi and Guido Messina.
