= Peter Pryor =

Australian cyclist (1930–2005)

Personal information
- Full name: Peter Joseph Pryor
- Born: 25 February 1930
- Died: 19 February 2005 (aged 74)

Cycling career
- Sport: Cycling

Peter Joseph Pryor (25 February 1930 – 19 February 2005) was an Australian racing cyclist. He competed in three events at the 1952 Summer Olympics.
