= Ken Caves =

Australian cyclist (1926–1974)

Personal information
- Full name: Kenneth John Caves
- Born: 4 November 1926 Brisbane, Australia
- Died: 31 July 1974 (aged 47)

Cycling career
- Sport: Cycling
Medal record
Men's Track cycling
Representing Australia
Commonwealth Games
Bronze medal – third place	1950 Auckland	10 Mile Scratch Race

Kenneth John Caves (4 November 1926 – 31 July 1974) was an Australian cyclist. He competed at the 1948 and 1952 Summer Olympics.
