= Peter Attrill =

Australian sailor

- Born: 28 November 1929 (age 95); Tasmania, Australia
- Citizenship: Australia
- Occupation: Sailor
- Known for: Competing in the 1952 Summer Olympics

Peter Attrill (born 28 November 1929) is an Australian former sailor who competed in the 1952 Summer Olympics.
