= Jim Nevin =

Australian cyclist (1931–2017)

Personal information
- Full name: James Julian Nevin
- Born: 26 January 1931 Melbourne, Australia
- Died: 10 August 2017 (aged 86) Tasmania, Australia

Cycling career
- Sport: Cycling

Jim Nevin OAM (26 January 1931 – 10 August 2017) was an Australian cyclist. He competed at the 1952 and 1956 Summer Olympics. In 1953, he won stage 4 of the Tour of Ireland.

Nevin was awarded the Medal of the Order of Australia in the 1994 Australia Day Honours. He received the Australian Sports Medal in 2000.
