= Marino Morettini =

Italian cyclist (1931–1990)

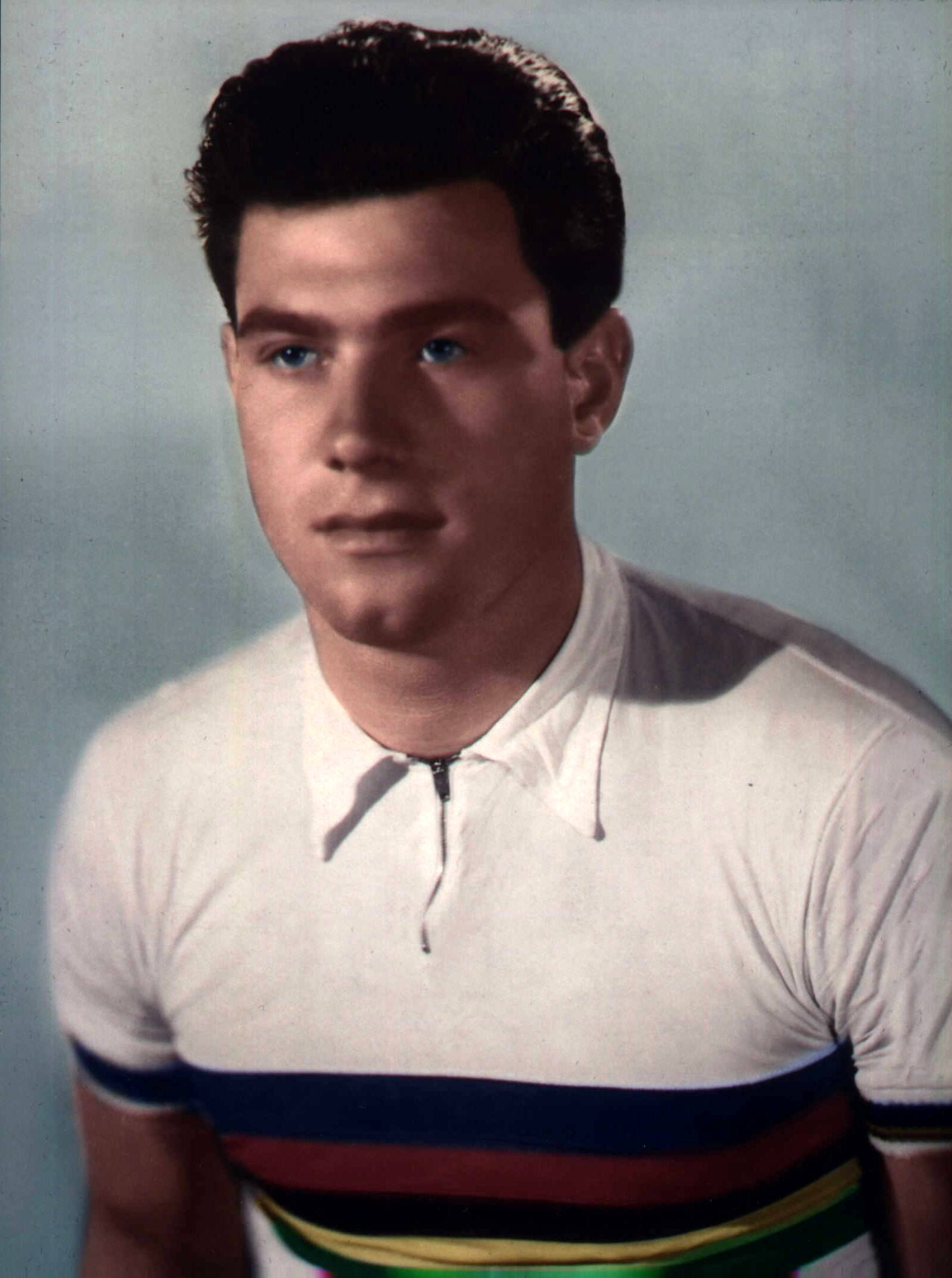

Personal information
- Full name: Marino Morettini
- Born: 2 January 1931 Vertova, Italy
- Died: 10 December 1990 (aged 59) Milan, Italy

Cycling career
- Sport: Cycling
- Disciplines: Road and track
- Role: Rider
Medal record
Representing Italy
Men's track cycling
Olympic Games
| Gold medal – first place | 1952 Helsinki | 4.000m Team Pursuit |
| Silver medal – second place | 1952 Helsinki | 1.000m Time Trial |

Marino Morettini (2 January 1931 – 10 December 1990) was a road bicycle and track cyclist from Italy, who won the silver medal in the men's 1.000m time trial at the 1952 Summer Olympics. At the same Olympic tournament he claimed the gold medal in the men's 4.000m team pursuit, alongside Loris Campana, Mino De Rossi and Guido Messina. He was a professional rider from 1954 to 1963.
