= Peter Nelson (cyclist) =

Australian cyclist (1931–1977)

Personal information
- Full name: Peter Nelson
- Born: 26 April 1931 Black Forest, Australia
- Died: 2 February 1977 (aged 45) Unley, Australia

Cycling career
- Sport: Cycling
- Disciplines: Track, road
- Role: Rider

Amateur team
- Sturt Cycling Club

Peter Nelson (26 April 1931 – 2 February 1977) was an Australian Olympic road and track cyclist.

He was South Australian state champion in 1950 for the 15, 25 and 50-mile events, and again in 1953 for the 50-mile events. He attended the 1952 Summer Olympics in Helsinki as part of the Australian road cycling team in the 190 km event and in the track team for the 4000 m team pursuit.

== Biography ==
Peter Nelson was born on 26 April 1931 in Black Forest, South Australia, the son of wheelwright and automotive manufacturing engineer Frederick Nelson, and his wife Winifred (née Mostyn). He was educated at Christian Brothers College, Adelaide. Nelson won his first race as a 16-year-old in 1947, and thereafter committed himself to become a professional cyclist. Jim Nestor, a two-time Olympian, took interest in him and encouraged him to train as a road cyclist and to join a club. Nelson joined the Sturt Cycling Club, based at the outdoor velodrome at Edwardstown Recreational Ground.

His resolution and commitment paid off. In 1950 he was 15, 25 and 50 mile state champion and was included on the state senior team. He was successful in the 100 mile Mail Run and won the Adelaide-Milang one day classic.

In 1951, he won the road race in the Australian Olympic trials and was included in the Australian team to compete in Helsinki. En route to Helsinki, Nelson met his future wife, Marjorie Jackson. At the 1952 Summer Olympics in Helsinki, Nelson competed in the 190 km event and in the track team for the 4000m team pursuit. Despite extremely high expectations, the Australian team finished only seventeenth. Many blame this on the interruption to training the team experienced while being accommodated in London. It was extremely difficult to train in the congested, populous city.

Nelson returned to Adelaide and in 1953 he reclaimed his title as 50 mile state champion. Later that year on 7 November, he was married to Marjorie Jackson in Lithgow, New South Wales. Both returned to Adelaide the following year and retired from their sports. The couple settled down on an almond orchard outside Mclaren Vale where they raised three children.

Later in life Nelson was involved heavily with the Unley Rotary Club and was instrumental in establishing the Unley Memorial Swimming Pool, where he later taught swimming classes.

Peter and his wife Marjorie operated Nelson’s Menswear, a sports and clothing shop on Unley Road, Unley.

== Death ==
Peter Nelson died of leukaemia on 2 February 1977 aged 45 years old. The Peter Nelson Leukaemia Foundation stands in his honour, established by his widow.
