= Guido Messina =

Italian cyclist (1931–2020)

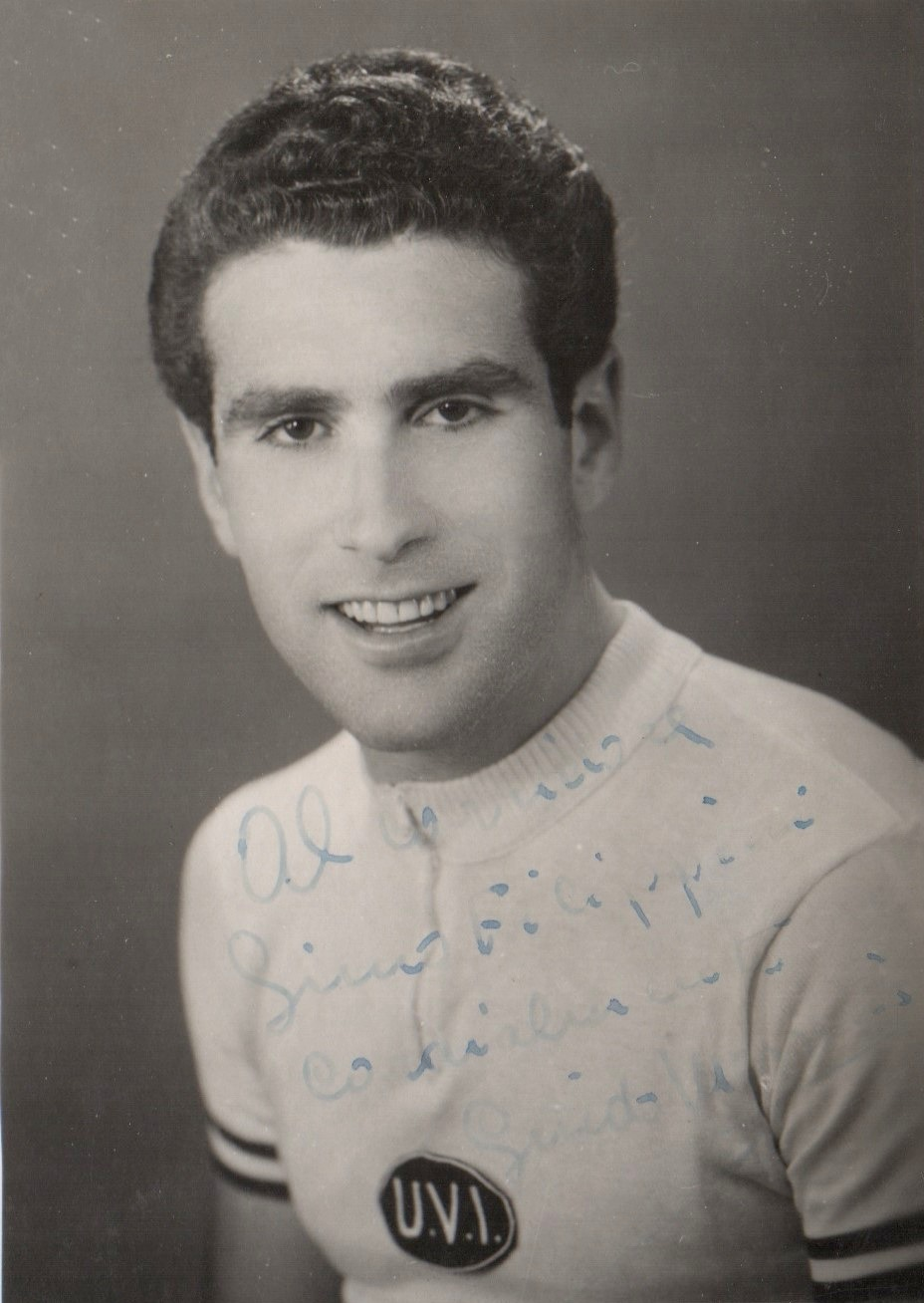

Personal information
- Full name: Guido Messina
- Born: 4 January 1931 Monreale, Italy
- Died: 10 January 2020 (aged 89) Caselette, Italy

Cycling career
- Sport: Cycling
- Disciplines: Track, road
- Role: Rider
Medal record
Men's cycling: 4000 m pursuit
Representing Italy
Olympic Games
Gold medal – first place	1952 Helsinki	Team
World Championships
Gold medal – first place	1948 Amsterdam	Ind., amateur
Bronze medal – third place	1950 Rocourt	Ind., amateur
Bronze medal – third place	1951 Milan	Ind., amateur
Gold medal – first place	1953 Zürich	Ind., amateur
Gold medal – first place	1954 Cologne	Ind., prof.
Gold medal – first place	1955 Milan	Ind., prof.
Gold medal – first place	1956 Copenhagen	Ind., prof.
Bronze medal – third place	1957 Rocourt	Ind., prof.

Guido Messina (4 January 1931 – 10 January 2020) was an Italian road and track cyclist.

He was born in Monreale, Italy, on 4 January 1931. On track, he won five world titles in the individual 4000 m pursuit between 1948 and 1956, and a gold medal with the Italian team at the 1952 Olympics (individual pursuit became an Olympic event only in 1964, when Messina retired from cycling). Between 1954 and 1963, he rode professionally and won the first stage of the 1955 Giro d'Italia. He died six days after his 89th birthday on 10 January 2020.
