= New Zealand at the 1952 Summer Olympics =

- IOC code: NZL
- NOC: New Zealand Olympic and British Empire Games Association
- Website: www.olympic.org.nz

in Helsinki
- Competitors: 14 in 5 sports
- Flag bearer: Harold Cleghorn
- Officials: 3
- Medals Ranked 24th: Gold 1 Silver 0 Bronze 2 Total 3

Summer Olympics appearances (overview)
- 1908; 1912; 1920; 1924; 1928; 1932; 1936; 1948; 1952; 1956; 1960; 1964; 1968; 1972; 1976; 1980; 1984; 1988; 1992; 1996; 2000; 2004; 2008; 2012; 2016; 2020; 2024

Other related appearances
- Australasia (1908–1912)

New Zealand at the 1952 Summer Olympics was represented by a team of 14 competitors (and one travelling reserve) and three officials. Selection of the team for the Games in Helsinki, Finland, was the responsibility of the New Zealand Olympic and British Empire Games Association. New Zealand's flagbearer at the opening ceremony was Harold Cleghorn. The New Zealand team finished equal 24th on the medal table, winning a total of three medals, one of which was gold.

== Medal tables ==
Medal	Name	Sport	Event	Date
Gold	Yvette Williams	Athletics	Women's long jump	23 July
Bronze	John Holland	Athletics	Men's 400 m hurdles	21 July
Bronze	Jean Stewart	Swimming	Women's 100 m backstroke	31 July

Medals by sport
Sport	Gold medal	Silver medal	Bronze medal	Total
Athletics	1	0	1	2
Swimming	0	0	1	1
Total	1	0	2	3

Medals by gender
Gender	Gold medal	Silver medal	Bronze medal	Total
Male	0	0	1	1
Female	1	0	1	2
Total	1	0	2	3

== Athletics ==
=== Track ===
Athlete	Event	Heat		Quarterfinal		Semifinal		Final	
Athlete	Event	Result	Rank (Note: Ranks given are within the heat)	Result	Rank (Note: Ranks given are within the quarterfinal)	Result	Rank (Note: Ranks given are within the semifinal)	Result	Rank
John Holland	Men's 400 m hurdles	53.3	1 Q	52.2	1 Q	52.0	2 Q	52.0	3rd place, bronze medalist(s)
George Hoskins	Men's 1500 m	3:56.2	1 Q	—N/a		3:53.0	12	did not advance	
George Hoskins	Men's 5000 m	DNF		—N/a				did not advance	
Maurice Marshall	Men's 800 m	1:56.2	4	—N/a		did not advance			
Maurice Marshall	Men's 1500 m	4:01.0	7	—N/a		did not advance			

=== Field ===
Athlete	Event	Qualification		Final	
Athlete	Event	Result	Rank	Result	Rank
Yvette Williams	Women's discus throw	41.32	4 Q	40.48	10
Yvette Williams	Women's long jump	6.16 OR	1 Q	6.24 OR	1st place, gold medalist(s)
Yvette Williams	Women's shot put	12.64	10 Q	13.35	6

== Cycling ==
=== Track ===
Men's 1000 m time trial

Athlete	Time	Rank
Malcolm Simpson	1:15.1	11

Men's sprint

Athlete	Round 1	Round 1 repechage	Quarterfinals	Quarterfinals repechage	Semifinals	Semifinals repechage	Final	
Athlete	Opposition Result	Opposition Result	Opposition Result	Opposition Result	Opposition Result	Opposition Result	Opposition Result	Rank
Colin Dickinson	Szekeres (HUN); Millman (CAN); Siegenthaler (SUI); 4 R	Robinson (SAF); Masanés (CHI); Farnum (JAM); Ioniță (ROU); 3	did not advance					

Men's tandem

Athlete	Round 1	Round 1 repechage	Quarterfinals	Semifinals	Final	Rank
Athlete	Opposition Result	Opposition Result	Opposition Result	Opposition Result	Opposition Result	Rank
Colin Dickinson; Malcolm Simpson	Switzerland; W 11.3	—N/a	France; L	did not advance		=5

== Rowing ==
In 1952, seven rowing competitions were held, and New Zealand entered a single boat: a coxed four. The competition was for men only; women would first row at the 1976 Summer Olympics. Hector McLeod travelled to the Summer Olympics as a reserve but did not compete.

Athlete	Event	Heats		Repechage		Semi-finals		Semi-finals repechage		Final	
Athlete	Event	Time	Rank	Time	Rank	Time	Rank	Time	Rank	Time	Rank
Ted Johnson; John O'Brien; Kerry Ashby; Bill Tinnock; Colin Johnstone	Coxed four	7:25.2	4 R	7:07.3	2	Did not advance					

== Swimming ==
Athlete	Event	Heat		Semifinal		Final	
Athlete	Event	Result	Rank	Result	Rank	Result	Rank
Lincoln Hurring	Men's 100 m backstroke	1:09.6	13 Q	1:10.2	14	did not advance	
Jean Stewart	Women's 100 m backstroke	1:16.0	4 Q	—N/a		1:15.8	3rd place, bronze medalist(s)

== Weightlifting ==
Athlete	Event	Press		Snatch		Clean & Jerk		Total	Rank
Athlete	Event	Result	Rank	Result	Rank	Result	Rank	Total	Rank
Harold Cleghorn	Men's heavyweight	130	=6	117.5	=6	152.5	=7	400.0	7

== Officials ==
- Chef de mission – Jack Squire
- Chaperone – Matilda Lucy Leeder
