= Cycling at the 1952 Summer Olympics – Men's sprint =

Men's sprint at the Games of the XV Olympiad
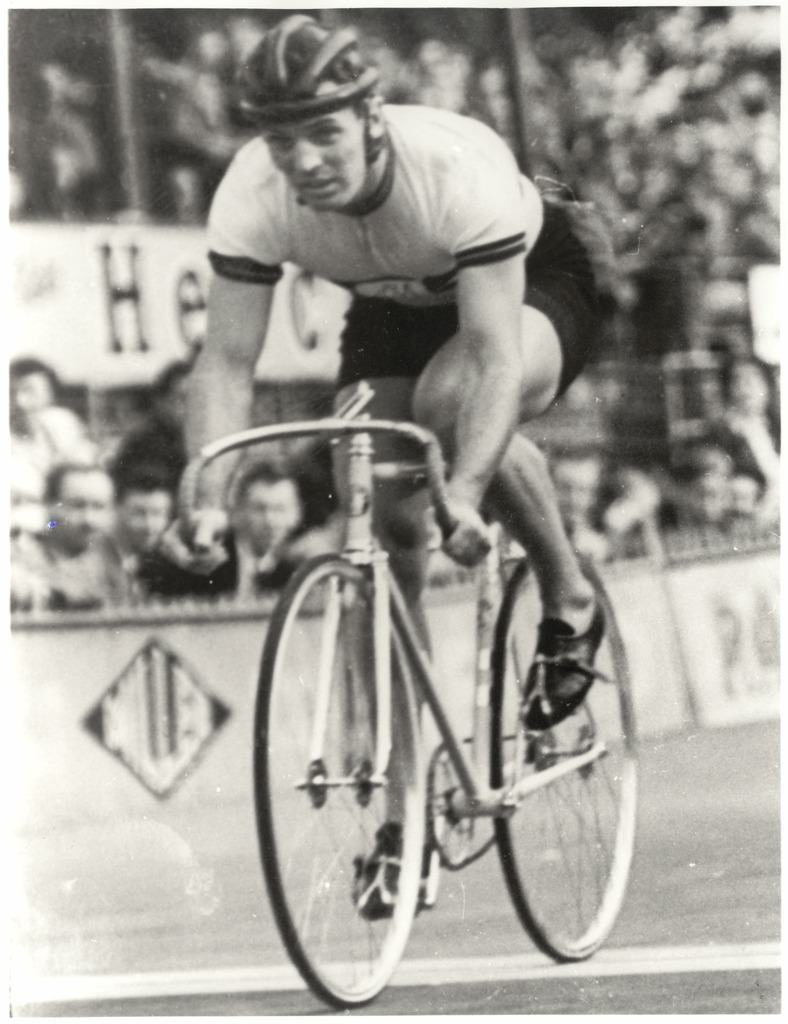
- Lionel Cox
- Venue: Helsinki Velodrome
- Dates: July 28 – 31, 1952
- Competitors: 27 from 27 nations

Medalists
1st place, gold medalist(s)		Enzo Sacchi; Italy
2nd place, silver medalist(s)		Lionel Cox; Australia
3rd place, bronze medalist(s)		Werner Potzernheim; Germany

The men's sprint (or "scratch race") at the 1952 Summer Olympics in Helsinki, Finland was held from July 28 to July 31, 1952. There were 27 participants from 27 nations, with each nation limited to a single cyclist. The event was won by Enzo Sacchi of Italy, the nation's second consecutive victory in the men's sprint. Lionel Cox's silver was Australia's first medal in the event. Werner Potzernheim of Germany took bronze.

== Background ==
This was the 10th appearance of the event, which has been held at every Summer Olympics except 1904 and 1912. None of the semifinalists from 1948 returned. The heavy favorite was Enzo Sacchi, the reigning world champion. The man who would have been his biggest competitor, Russell Mockridge of Australia, competed only in the track time trial and tandem.

Finland, Guatemala, Jamaica, Japan, Romania, and the Soviet Union each made their debut in the men's sprint. France made its 10th appearance, the only nation to have competed at every appearance of the event.

== Competition format ==
This track cycling event consisted of numerous rounds: four main rounds and three repechages. Each race involved the riders starting simultaneously and next to each other, from a standing start. Because the early part of races tend to be slow-paced and highly tactical, only the time for the last 200 metres of the one-kilometre race is typically recorded.

The trend in the Olympic sprint competition was toward expansion of a best-of-three match format (beginning in 1932 for the final, expanding in 1936 and 1948 to more rounds); the 1952 edition bucked that trend by returning to an entirely single-race format for the first time since 1928. It also used races with up to five cyclists, where other recent Games had limited individuals races to two or three competitors. A repechage was used after each round instead of only early rounds; late-round races featured three cyclists instead of the head-to-head format that had become common. This also meant that there was no bronze medal match.

The first round consisted of eight heats of three or four cyclists each; the winner of each heat advanced to the quarterfinals while all others were sent to the first repechage. The first repechage had four heats, one of four cyclists and three of five cyclists (though in one of these heats only three men started); again, the winner advanced to the quarterfinals, but this time all others were eliminated. The 12 quarterfinalists competed in four heats of three cyclists each; winners advanced to the semifinals while second and third place cyclists went to the second repechage. The second repechage had two heats of four cyclists each; the winner advanced to the semifinals while the others were all eliminated. With six semifinalists, the semifinals consisted of two heats of three men each. Once again, the winner of each heat advanced while others were sent to a third repechage. The third repechage was a single race of the four semifinal losers, with the winner advancing to the final. The final featured the remaining three riders.

== Records ==
The records for the sprint are 200 metre flying time trial records, kept for the qualifying round in later Games as well as for the finish of races.

World record	Unknown	Unknown^{*}	Unknown	Unknown
Olympic record	Thomas Johnson (GBR)	11.8	Antwerp, Belgium	9 August 1920

^{*} World records were not tracked by the UCI until 1954.

Cyril Peacock broke the Olympic record with 11.7 seconds in the sixth heat of round 1. Werner Potzernheim matched that in the first heat of the first repechage; John Millman did the same in the third heat. Peacock recorded the same time again in the second quarterfinal. Potzernheim bettered that time in the fourth quarterfinal, finishing the last 200 metres in 11.6 seconds. Lionel Cox matched that time in the second semifinal, with Potzernheim tying it again in the third repechage.

== Schedule ==
All times are Eastern European Summer Time (UTC+3)

Date	Time	Round
Monday, 28 July 1952	11:00	Round 1 First repechage
Tuesday, 29 July 1952	11:00 18:00	Quarterfinals; Second repechage Semifinals; Third repechage
Thursday, 31 July 1952	18:00	Final

== Results ==
=== Round 1 ===
==== Round 1 heat 1 ====
Rank	Cyclist	Nation	Time 200 m	Notes
1	Lionel Cox	Australia	11.9	Q
2	Werner Potzernheim	Germany		R
3	Hernán Masanés	Chile		R

==== Round 1 heat 2 ====
Rank	Cyclist	Nation	Time 200 m	Notes
1	Stéphan Martens	Belgium	12.9	Q
2	Kurt Nemetz	Austria		R
3	Netai Bysack	India		R

==== Round 1 heat 3 ====
Rank	Cyclist	Nation	Time 200 m	Notes
1	Franck Lenormand	France	12.6	Q
2	Kenneth Farnum	Jamaica		R
3	Otar Dadunashvili	Soviet Union		R

==== Round 1 heat 4 ====
Rank	Cyclist	Nation	Time 200 m	Notes
1	Antonio Giménez	Argentina	12.8	Q
2	Helge Törn	Finland		R
3	Kihei Tomioka	Japan		R

==== Round 1 heat 5 ====
Rank	Cyclist	Nation	Time 200 m	Notes
1	Enzo Sacchi	Italy	12.4	Q
2	Zdeněk Košta	Czechoslovakia		R
3	Muhammad Naqi Mallick	Pakistan		R

==== Round 1 heat 6 ====
Rank	Cyclist	Nation	Time 200 m	Notes
1	Cyril Peacock	Great Britain	11.7	Q, OR
2	Ove Krogh Rants	Denmark		R
3	Ion Ionita	Romania		R
4	Gustavo Martínez	Guatemala		R

==== Round 1 heat 7 ====
Rank	Cyclist	Nation	Time 200 m	Notes
1	Béla Szekeres	Hungary	11.9	Q
2	John Millman	Canada		R
3	Fritz Siegenthaler	Switzerland		R
4	Colin Dickinson	New Zealand		R

==== Round 1 heat 8 ====
Rank	Cyclist	Nation	Time 200 m	Notes
1	Johan Hijzelendoorn	Netherlands	12.1	Q
2	Raymond Robinson	South Africa		R
3	Steven Hromjak	United States		R
4	Luis Toro	Venezuela		R

=== First repechage ===
==== First repechage heat 1 ====
Rank	Cyclist	Nation	Time 200 m	Notes
1	Werner Potzernheim	Germany	11.7	Q, =OR
2	Otar Dadunashvili	Soviet Union		
3	Luis Toro	Venezuela		
4	Steven Hromjak	United States		
5	Helge Törn	Finland		

==== First repechage heat 2 ====
Rank	Cyclist	Nation	Time 200 m	Notes
1	Ove Krogh Rants	Denmark	12.3	Q
2	Fritz Siegenthaler	Switzerland		
3	Zdeněk Košta	Czechoslovakia		
4	Kihei Tomioka	Japan		

==== First repechage heat 3 ====
Rank	Cyclist	Nation	Time 200 m	Notes
1	John Millman	Canada		Q, =OR
2	Kurt Nemetz	Austria		
3	Muhammad Naqi Mallick	Pakistan		
—	Netai Bysack	India	DNS	
—	Gustavo Martínez	Guatemala	DNS	

==== First repechage heat 4 ====
Rank	Cyclist	Nation	Time 200 m	Notes
1	Raymond Robinson	South Africa	12.3	Q
2	Hernán Masanés	Chile		
3	Colin Dickinson	New Zealand		
4	Kenneth Farnum	Jamaica		
5	Ion Ionita	Romania		

=== Quarterfinals ===
==== Quarterfinal 1 ====
Rank	Cyclist	Nation	Time 200 m	Notes
1	Lionel Cox	Australia	12.5	Q
2	Raymond Robinson	South Africa		R
3	Stéphan Martens	Belgium		R

==== Quarterfinal 2 ====
Rank	Cyclist	Nation	Time 200 m	Notes
1	Cyril Peacock	Great Britain	11.7	Q, =OR
2	Franck Lenormand	France		R
3	John Millman	Canada		R

==== Quarterfinal 3 ====
Rank	Cyclist	Nation	Time 200 m	Notes
1	Enzo Sacchi	Italy	12.0	Q
2	Ove Krogh Rants	Denmark		R
3	Béla Szekeres	Hungary		R

==== Quarterfinal 4 ====
Rank	Cyclist	Nation	Time 200 m	Notes
1	Werner Potzernheim	Germany	11.6	Q, OR
2	Antonio Giménez	Argentina		R
3	Johan Hijzelendoorn	Netherlands		R

=== Second repechage ===
==== Second repechage heat 1 ====
Rank	Cyclist	Nation	Time 200 m	Notes
1	Raymond Robinson	South Africa	11.8	Q
2	John Millman	Canada		
3	Johan Hijzelendoorn	Netherlands		
4	Ove Krogh Rants	Denmark		

==== Second repechage heat 2 ====
A crash in the original race of this heat resulted in a re-run. Giménez had the lead with Martens on his outside; Lenormand hit Martens's back wheel while trying to pass him. Lenormand had to be taken to the hospital for his injuries and could not compete in the re-run. Martens was able to race, but was hampered by his injuries.

Original

Rank	Cyclist	Nation	Time 200 m	Notes
1	Antonio Giménez	Argentina	12.3	R
2	Béla Szekeres	Hungary		R
—	Stéphan Martens	Belgium	DNF	R
—	Franck Lenormand	France	DNF	R

Re-run

Rank	Cyclist	Nation	Time 200 m	Notes
1	Béla Szekeres	Hungary	11.8	Q
2	Antonio Giménez	Argentina		
3	Stéphan Martens	Belgium		
—	Franck Lenormand	France	DNS	

=== Semifinals ===
==== Semifinal 1 ====
Rank	Cyclist	Nation	Time 200 m	Notes
1	Enzo Sacchi	Italy	12.0	Q
2	Raymond Robinson	South Africa		R
3	Werner Potzernheim	Germany		R

==== Semifinal 2 ====
Rank	Cyclist	Nation	Time 200 m	Notes
1	Lionel Cox	Australia	11.6	Q, =OR
2	Cyril Peacock	Great Britain		R
3	Béla Szekeres	Hungary		R

=== Third repechage ===
Rank	Cyclist	Nation	Time 200 m	Notes
1	Werner Potzernheim	Germany	11.6	Q, =OR
2	Cyril Peacock	Great Britain		
3	Raymond Robinson	South Africa		
4	Béla Szekeres	Hungary		

=== Final ===
Rank	Cyclist	Nation	Time 200 m
1st place, gold medalist(s)	Enzo Sacchi	Italy	12.0
2nd place, silver medalist(s)	Lionel Cox	Australia	
3rd place, bronze medalist(s)	Werner Potzernheim	Germany	

== Final classification ==
Rank	Cyclist	Nation
1st place, gold medalist(s)	Enzo Sacchi	Italy
2nd place, silver medalist(s)	Lionel Cox	Australia
3rd place, bronze medalist(s)	Werner Potzernheim	Germany
4	Cyril Peacock	Great Britain
5	Raymond Robinson	South Africa
6	Béla Szekeres	Hungary
7	Antonio Giménez	Argentina
7	John Millman	Canada
9	Johan Hijzelendoorn	Netherlands
9	Stéphan Martens	Belgium
11	Franck Lenormand	France
11	Ove Krogh Rants	Denmark
13	Otar Dadunashvili	Soviet Union
13	Hernán Masanés	Chile
13	Kurt Nemetz	Austria
13	Fritz Siegenthaler	Switzerland
17	Colin Dickinson	New Zealand
17	Zdeněk Košta	Czechoslovakia
17	Muhammad Naqi Mallick	Pakistan
17	Luis Toro	Venezuela
21	Kenneth Farnum	Jamaica
21	Steven Hromjak	United States
21	Kihei Tomioka	Japan
24	Helge Törn	Finland
24	Ion Ionita	Romania
26	Netai Bysack	India
26	Gustavo Martínez	Guatemala
