= Cycling at the 1952 Summer Olympics – Men's track time trial =

Men's track time trial at the Games of the XV Olympiad
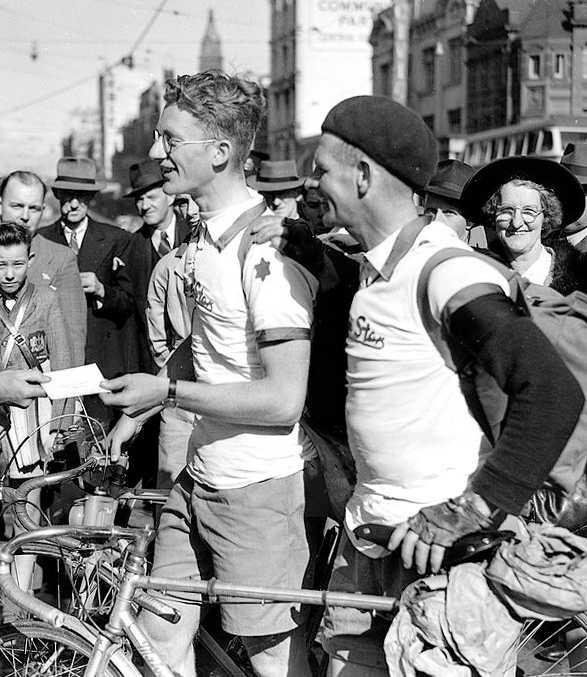
- Russell Mockridge (1948)
- Venue: Helsinki Velodrome
- Date: July 31, 1952
- Competitors: 27 from 27 nations
- Winning time: 1:11.1 OR

Medalists
1st place, gold medalist(s)		Russell Mockridge; Australia
2nd place, silver medalist(s)		Marino Morettini; Italy
3rd place, bronze medalist(s)		Raymond Robinson; South Africa

The men's track time trial at the 1952 Summer Olympics in Helsinki, Finland was held on July 31, 1952. There were 27 participants from 27 nations, with each nation limited to one competitor. The event was won by Russell Mockridge of Australia, the nation's first victory in the men's track time trial since 1932 and second overall (tying France for most of any nation). Marino Morettini's silver was Italy's first medal in the event; Raymond Robinson's bronze was South Africa's. France's three-Games podium streak ended.

== Background ==
This was the sixth appearance of the event, which had previously been held in 1896 and every Games since 1928. It would be held every Games until being dropped from the programme after 2004. The only returning cyclist from 1948 was tenth-place finisher Onni Kasslin of Finland. Russell Mockridge of Australia had competed in the road race in 1948; he had won the sprint and time trial at the 1950 British Empire Games and taken second place in the 1951 sprint world championship. Marino Morettini was the amateur world record holder.

Czechoslovakia, Guatemala, Jamaica, Japan, Romania, and the Soviet Union each made their debut in the men's track time trial. France and Great Britain each made their sixth appearance, having competed at every appearance of the event.

== Competition format ==
The event was a time trial on the track, with each cyclist competing separately to attempt to achieve the fastest time. Each cyclist raced one kilometre from a standing start.

== Records ==
The following were the world and Olympic records prior to the competition.

World record	Marino Morettini (ITA)	1:10.6	Milan, Italy	18 October 1950
Olympic record	Arie van Vliet (NED)	1:12.0	Berlin, Germany	1 August 1936

Russell Mockridge broke the Olympic record. Nobody else was able to surpass the old time.

== Schedule ==
All times are Eastern European Summer Time (UTC+3)

Date	Time	Round
Thursday, 31 July 1952	11:00	Final

== Results ==
Kato was the first to ride. Robinson was sixth, and was the first to surpass the 1948 winner's time; Robinson led for much of the competition. Mockridge was 20th, finally surpassing Robinson with a new Olympic record. Morettini went 26th, unable to beat Mockridge but dropping Robinson to third place.

Rank	Cyclist	Nation	Time	Notes
1st place, gold medalist(s)	Russell Mockridge	Australia	1:11.1	OR
2nd place, silver medalist(s)	Marino Morettini	Italy	1:12.7	
3rd place, bronze medalist(s)	Raymond Robinson	South Africa	1:13.0	
4	Clodomiro Cortoni	Argentina	1:13.2	
5	Donald McKellow	Great Britain	1:13.3	
6	Ib Vagn Hansen	Denmark	1:14.4	
7	Ion Ioniţă	Romania	1:14.4	
8	Jan Hijzelendoorn	Netherlands	1:14.5	
9	Henri Andrieux	France	1:14.7	
10	Joseph De Bakker	Belgium	1:14.7	
11	Malcolm Simpson	New Zealand	1:15.1	
12	Ladislav Fouček	Czechoslovakia	1:15.2	
13	Lev Tsipursky	Soviet Union	1:15.2	
14	Onni Kasslin	Finland	1:15.3	
15	Fredy Arber	Switzerland	1:15.4	
16	Andoni Ituarte	Venezuela	1:15.4	
17	Hernán Masanés	Chile	1:15.9	
18	István Lang	Hungary	1:16.9	
19	Luis Angel de los Santos	Uruguay	1:17.0	
20	Kenneth Farnum	Jamaica	1:17.2	
21	Kurt Nemetz	Austria	1:17.5	
22	Frederick Henry	Canada	1:17.6	
23	Frank Brilando	United States	1:17.8	
24	Gustavo Martínez	Guatemala	1:18.9	
25	Imtiaz Bhatti	Pakistan	1:21.2	
26	Tadashi Kato	Japan	1:23.2	
27	Suprovat Chakravarty	India	1:26.0	
