= Cycling at the 1952 Summer Olympics – Men's tandem =

Men's tandem at the Games of the XV Olympiad
- Dates: July 28 – 31, 1952
- Competitors: 28 from 14 nations

Medalists
1st place, gold medalist(s)		Lionel Cox, Russell Mockridge	Australia
2nd place, silver medalist(s)		Raymond Robinson, Thomas Shardelow	South Africa
3rd place, bronze medalist(s)		Cesare Pinarello, Antonio Maspes	Italy

These are the official results of the Men's 2.000m Tandem Race at the 1952 Summer Olympics in Helsinki, Finland, held from July 28 to July 31, 1952. There were fourteen couples participating in this competition.

== Final classification ==
RANK	NAME CYCLISTS	TEAM
	Lionel Cox; Russell Mockridge	Australia
	Raymond Robinson; Thomas Shardelow	South Africa
	Cesare Pinarello; Antonio Maspes	Italy
4.	Franck Le Normand; Robert Vidal	France
5.	Jens Juul Eriksen; Olaf Holmstrup	Denmark
6.	Alan Bannister; Leslie Wilson	Great Britain
7.	Imre Furmen; István Schillerwein	Hungary
8.	Malcolm Simpson; Colin Dickinson	New Zealand
9.	Fredy Arber; Fritz Siegenthaler	Switzerland
10.	Gabriel Glorieux; Pierre Gosselin	Belgium
11.	Kurt Nemetz; Walter Bortel	Austria
12.	Ensio Nieminen; Olavi Linnonmaa	Finland
13.	Kihei Tomioka; Tamotsu Chikanari	Japan
14.	Frank Brilando; Richard Cortright	United States

- Cox and Mockridge had never ridden together, but decided to enter the event after arriving in Helsinki. Without a bike, they were given a disassembled bike by a British rider, which they had to put together.
