= Kosta (surname) =

Kosta is a surname. Notable people with the surname include:

- Michael Kosta (born 1979), American stand-up comedian
- Nicole Kosta (born 1993), Canadian ice hockey player
- Shiv Prasad Kosta (born 1931), Indian space scientist and educationist
- Steve Kosta (born 1950), Australian former rugby league footballer
- Tessa Kosta (1890–1981), American actress who starred in Broadway musicals and operettas
- Zdeněk Košta (1923–2020), Czech Olympic cyclist

== See also ==
- Costa (surname)
