= Werner Potzernheim =

German cyclist (1927–2014)

Personal information
- Born: 8 March 1927 Hamburg, Weimar Republic
- Died: 22 April 2014 (aged 87) Hemmingen, Germany

Cycling career
- Sport: Cycling
Medal record
Representing Germany
Men's track cycling
Olympic Games
Bronze medal – third place	1952 Helsinki	Sprint Scratch Race

Werner Potzernheim (8 March 1927 – 22 April 2014) was a German road bicycle and track cyclist, who won the bronze medal in the men's 1.000m sprint scratch race at the 1952 Summer Olympics in Helsinki, Finland behind Enzo Sacchi (Italy) and Lionel Cox (Australia). He was a professional rider from 1954 to 1966. Originally from Hamburg, Werner Potzernheim moved to Hanover in 1950.
