= Henry Frederick =

Henry Frederick may refer to:

- Henry Frederick, Prince of Wales (1594–1612), Duke of Cornwall and of Rothesay, etc., eldest son of James I of England, VI of Scots
- Henry Frederick Werker (1920–1984), American lawyer
- Prince Henry Frederick, Duke of Cumberland and Strathearn (1745–1790), Grand Master of the Premier Grand Lodge of England
- Henry Frederick, Count of Hohenlohe-Langenburg (1625–1699)
- Henry Frederick, Hereditary Prince of the Palatinate (1614–1629)

== See also ==
- Henry Frederick Conrad Sander (1847–1920), German-born orchidologist and nurseryman
- H. F. Baker (Henry Frederick Baker, 1866–1956), British mathematician
- Frederick Heinrich
- Frederick Henry (disambiguation)
- Friedrich Heinrich
- Heinrich Friedrich
