= Heinrich Friedrich =

Heinrich Friedrich may refer to:

- Adolph Heinrich Friedrich Bartels (19th century), Mayor of Adelaide
- Christian Heinrich Friedrich Peters (1813–1890), German-American astronomer
- Heinrich Christian Friedrich Schumacher (1757–1830), Danish surgeon and botanist
- Heinrich Franz Friedrich Tietze (1880–1964), Austrian mathematician
- Heinrich Friedrich Karl Reichsfreiherr vom und zum Stein (1757–1831), German statesman for the Kingdom of Prussia
- Heinrich Friedrich Otto Abel (1824–1854), German historian
- Heinrich Friedrich Weber (1843–1912), German physicist
- Heinrich Rudolf Hermann Friedrich von Gneist (1816–1895), German jurist and politician
- Johann Heinrich Friedrich Link (1767–1850), German naturalist and botanist

== See also ==
- Frederick Heinrich
- Frederick Henry (disambiguation)
- Friedrich Heinrich
- Henry Frederick (disambiguation)
