= Costa (surname) =

- Origin: Italy, Spain, Portugal, France, Malta
- Distinctions: "da Costa", "de Costa", "e Costa"

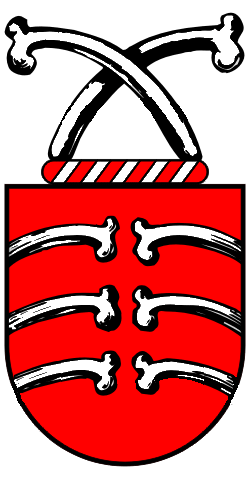
Coat of arms of Costa family in Portugal

Costa (Italian: [ˈkɔsta], Portuguese: [ˈkɔʃtɐ, ˈkɔstɐ],Spanish: [ˈkosta], is an Italian, Spanish, Portuguese, French, and Maltese mostly toponymic surname. The surname spread throughout the world through colonization. It was also a surname chosen by former Jews due to Roman Catholic and other Christian (often forced) conversions.

In Italy, Portugal, Galicia and Catalonia, it is derived from the Latin word costa, "rib", which has come to mean slope, coast (close to the sea, or coastline locations) in Romance languages. In Spain, it originates from Catalonia or Galicia, with the Spanish (Castilian) equivalent being Cuesta.

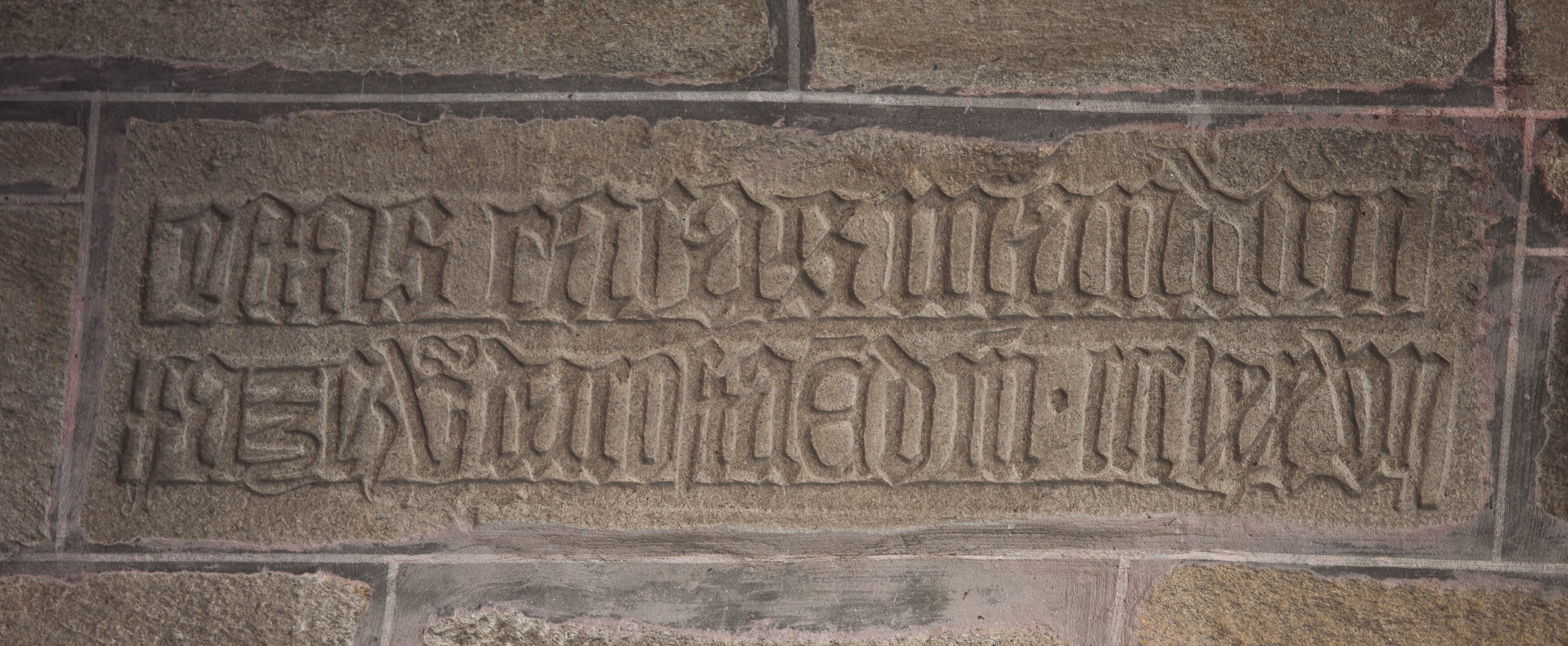
Mediaeval Galician inscription in a 14th-century house, in Noia: "ESTAS CASAS MANDOU FAZER VASCO DA COSTA, ERA DE MCCCLXXVII" These houses were ordered by Vasco da Costa, era 1377 (1339 AD)

== Geographical distribution ==
As of 2014, 71.0% of all known bearers of the surname Costa were residents of Brazil (frequency 1:141), 7.6% of Portugal (1:67), 5.2% of Mozambique (1:255), 3.7% of Italy (1:801), 2.4% of the United States (1:7,460), 1.9% of Guinea-Bissau (1:44), 1.5% of Spain (1:1,531), 1.2% of East Timor (1:49) and 1.2% of Argentina (1:1,809).

In Brazil, the frequency of the surname was higher than the national average (1:141) in the following states:

1. Maranhão (1:46)
2. Amapá (1:60)
3. Pará (1:74)
4. Roraima (1:77)
5. Acre (1:93)
6. Rio Grande do Norte (1:97)
7. Amazonas (1:98)
8. Ceará (1:112)
9. Bahia (1:112)
10. Tocantins (1:113)
11. Sergipe (1:117)
12. Piauí (1:119)
13. Paraíba (1:120)
14. Alagoas (1:131)
15. Federal District (1:131)
16. Minas Gerais (1:140)

In Italy, the frequency of the surname was higher than the national average (1:801) in the following regions:

1. Liguria (1:214)
2. Sicily (1:374)
3. Piedmont (1:458)
4. Veneto (1:489)
5. Emilia-Romagna (1:676)
6. Trentino-Alto Adige/Südtirol (1:763)
7. Lombardy (1:784)

In Spain, the frequency of the surname was higher than the national average (1:1,531) in the following autonomous communities:

1. Balearic Islands (1:399)
2. Catalonia (1:667)
3. Galicia (1:672)
4. Region of Murcia (1:845)
5. Valencian Community (1:1,001)

== People ==
=== Angola ===
- Desidério Costa (born 1934), politician
- Hélder Costa (born 1994), footballer

=== Australia ===
- Frank Costa (1938–2021), businessman
- Joseph Costa (born 1992), footballer
- Marcello Costa (1940–2024), Italian-born medical researcher and public health advocate
- Michael Costa (born 1956), politician
- Phil Costa (born 1949), politician

=== Brazil ===
- Angelo da Costa (born 1983), footballer
- Antônio da Costa Santos (1952–2001), architect and politician
- Carlos Duarte Costa (1888–1961), religious figure
- Celso Costa (born 1949), mathematician
- Delfim Moreira da Costa Ribeiro (1868–1920), president of Brazil from 1918 to 1919
- Douglas Costa (born 1990), footballer
- Fábio Costa (born 1977), footballer
- Gal Costa (1945–2022), singer
- Haroldo Costa (1930–2025), actor
- Jair da Costa (1940–2025), footballer
- Larissa Costa (born 1984), model
- Lúcio Costa (1902–1998), architect and urban planner
- Marcos Costa (born 1979), boxer
- Mariana Bridi da Costa (1988–2009), also known as Mari, model
- Newton da Costa (1929–2024), mathematician
- Renata Costa (born 1986), footballer
- Paulo Cezar Costa (born 1967), Brazilian prelate
- Paulo Costa (born 1991), mixed martial artist
- Petra Costa (born 1984), actress and filmmaker
- Rebecca da Costa (born 1984), actress and model
- Ronaldo da Costa (born 1970), long-distance runner
- Viviane Costa (born 1980), water polo player
- Yamandu Costa (born 1980), guitarist and composer

=== East Timor ===
- Maria do Céu Sarmento Pina da Costa (born 1968), politician
- Martinho da Costa Lopes (1918–1991), religious and political leader

=== France ===
- Emmanuel Da Costa (born 1977), French football player and manager
- Jean-Paul Costa (1941–2023), jurist
- Mélissa Da Costa (born 1990), French novelist
- Philippe Da Costa (born 1962), executive
- Stéphane Da Costa (born 1989), ice hockey player

=== Italy ===
- Aldo Costa (born 1961), Formula One engineer
- Alfredo Costa (1874–1913), opera singer
- Andrea Costa (1851–1910), politician
- Andrea Dalla Costa (born 1974), visual artist and filmmaker
- Beppe Costa (1941–2026), poet, writer, and publisher
- Elia Dalla Costa (1872–1961), cardinal
- Erminio Costa (1924–2009), neuroscientist
- Francesco Costa (1672–1740), painter
- Giovanni Costa (1826–1903), painter
- Lamberto Dalla Costa (1920–1982), bobsledder
- Lorenzo Costa (1460–1535), painter
- Marco Dalla Costa (born 1988), footballer
- Mariarosa Dalla Costa (born 1943), writer
- Nuccio Costa (1925–1991), television presenter
- Orazio Costa (1911–1999), theatre pedagogist and director
- Oronzio Gabriele Costa (1787–1867), zoologist
- Paolo Costa (born 1943), politician
- Silvia Costa (born 1949), politician

=== Portugal ===
- Adelino Amaro da Costa (1943–1980), politician
- Afonso Costa (1871–1937), prime minister of Portugal between 1913 and 1917
- Alberto Costa (born 1947), politician
- Alfredo Bruto da Costa, (1938–2016), politician
- Alfredo Luís da Costa (1883–1908), one of the perpetrators of the 1908 Lisbon Regicide
- Alfredo Nobre da Costa, (1923–1996), prime minister of Portugal in 1978
- António Costa (born 1961), current President of the European Council, prime minister of Portugal from 2015 to 2024
- António Costa Silva (born 1952), economist
- António Félix da Costa (born 1991), racing driver
- António Luís Costa (born 1953), serial killer
- Beatriz Costa (1907–1996), actress
- Cândido Costa (born 1981), footballer
- Carlos da Silva Costa (born 1949), economist
- Carole Costa (born 1990), footballer
- Catarina Costa (born 1996), judoka
- Diogo Costa (born 1999), footballer
- Francisco da Costa Gomes (1914–2001), president of Portugal from 1974 to 1976
- Francisco Fernandes Costa (1867–1925), politician
- Helena Costa (born 1978), football manager
- José Fonseca e Costa (1933–2015), film director
- Jorge Costa (1971–2025), football player and manager
- Jorge da Costa (1406–1508), cardinal
- Jorge Nuno Pinto da Costa (1937–2025), businessman, president of FC Porto from 1982 to 2024
- José Costa (born 1953), football player and manager
- Manuel da Costa (1541–1604), Jesuit missionary
- Manuel Gomes da Costa (1863–1929), president of Portugal in 1926
- Pedro Costa (born 1958), film director
- Ricardo Costa (born 1981), footballer
- Rui Costa (born 1972), footballer and sports executive
- Rui Costa (born 1986), cyclist
- Samú Costa (born 2000), footballer
- Susana Costa (born 1984), triple jumper
- Uriel da Costa (1585–1640), Sephardic Jew philosopher

=== Spain ===
- Albert Costa (born 1975), Catalan tennis player
- Albert Costa (born 1990), Catalan racing driver
- Carlos Costa (born 1968), Catalan tennis player
- Diego Costa (born 1988), Brazilian-born footballer
- Jaume Costa (born 1988), Valencian footballer
- Quim Costa (born 1957), Catalan basketball player
- Robert Costa (born 1994), Catalan footballer

=== Sri Lanka ===
- Asitha Costa (born 1970), cricketer
- Rex De Costa (1920–1971), medical doctor and army officer
- Wimal Kumara de Costa (1948–2016), actor

=== United States ===
- Catherine A. Costa (1926–2025), politician
- Dave Costa (1941–2013), American football player
- Dave Costa (born 1978), American football player (offensive lineman)
- Dino Costa, radio personality
- Don Costa (1925–1983), pop music arranger and record producer
- Jason Costa (born 1972), drummer
- Jay Costa (born 1957), politician
- Jeralita Costa (born 1959), politician
- Jim Costa (born 1952), politician
- Johnny Costa (1922–1996), jazz pianist
- Joseph Costa (1909–1998), Portuguese-born aviator
- Mary Costa (born 1930), actress and singer
- Matt Costa (born 1982), singer-songwriter
- Nikka Costa (born 1972), singer
- Robert Costa (born 1985), journalist
- Robert A. Costa (born 1958), politician
- Tony Costa (1944–1974), American serial killer
- John Costa (born 2009), Basketball player

=== United Kingdom ===
- Alberto Costa (born 1971), English politician
- Antony Costa (born 1981), English singer
- Benjamin Mendes da Costa (1803–1968), English merchant and philanthropist
- Catherine da Costa (1679–1756), English miniaturist
- Dan Costa (musician) (born 1989), British jazz pianist and composer
- Emanuel Mendes da Costa (1717–1791), English botanist, naturalist and philosopher
- Kitty da Costa (1710–1747), English Sephardic Jew
- Margaret Costa (1917–1999), food writer
- Michael Costa (1808–1884), Italian-born composer and conductor
- Sam Costa (1910–1981), English singer and entertainer

=== Other countries ===
- Alberto "Tino" Costa (born 1985), Argentinian footballer
- Alberto Zalamea Costa (1929–2011), Colombian journalist and diplomat
- Beatriz da Costa (1974–2012), German artist
- Gaspar da Costa (born 1749), Tenente geral (lieutenant general) of the Portuguese-speaking Topasses
- George Da Costa (1853–1929), Nigerian photographer
- Isaac da Costa (1798–1860), Dutch Jewish writer
- Jean-Luc Costa (born 1965), Swiss chess player
- Leonardo Costa (born 2008), German chess player
- Manuel da Costa (born 1984), French-born Moroccan footballer
- Manuel Pinto da Costa, president of São Tomé and Príncipe from 1975 to 1991
- Moses Costa (1950–2020), Bangladeshi Roman Catholic prelate
- Seiya Da Costa Lay (born 2001), Indonesian footballer
- Silvia Costa (born 1964), Cuban high jumper
- Troy Costa (born 1975), Indian fashion designer

== Fictional characters ==
- Manassseh da Costa, The King of Schnorrers
- Beatriz Da Costa, DC Comics character also known as Fire
- Roberto da Costa, Marvel Comics character also known as Sunspot
- Emmanuel da Costa, Marvel Comics character

== See also ==
- Costa (disambiguation)
- Kosta (surname)
