= Linnonmaa =

Linnonmaa is a Finnish surname. Notable people with the surname include:

- Harri Linnonmaa (born 1946), Finnish ice hockey player
- Jaajo Linnonmaa (born 1978), Finnish radio personality and actor
- Olavi Linnonmaa (1920–1995), Finnish cyclist
