= Constant Permeke =

Belgian painter and sculptor (1886–1952)

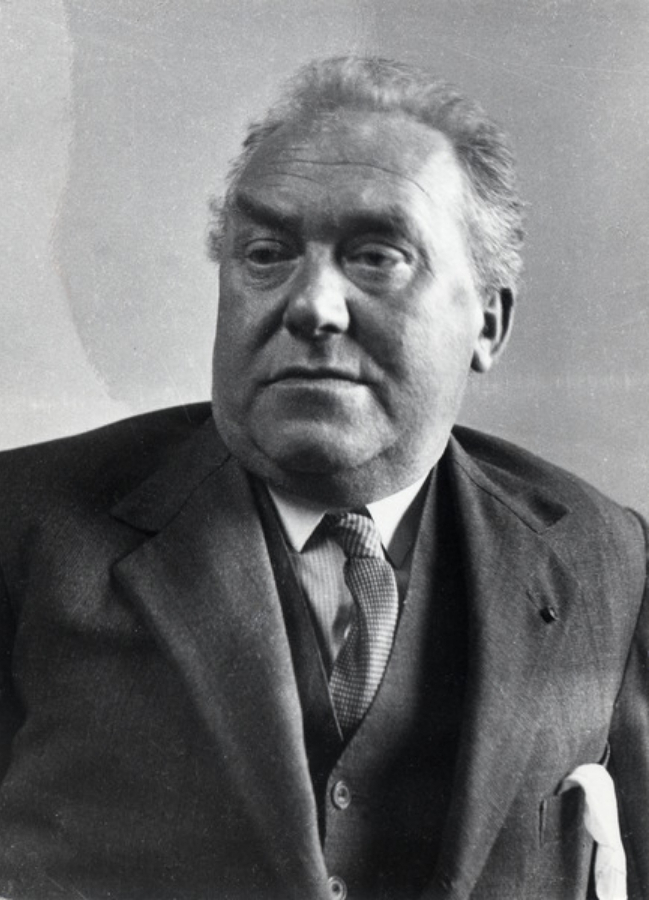
- Permeke in 1950
- Born: 31 July 1886; Antwerp
- Died: 4 January 1952 (aged 65); Jabbeke
- Education: Bruges Academy of Fine Arts
- Alma mater: Royal Academy of Fine Arts (KASK)
- Movement: Flemish Expressionism
- Spouse: Maria Delaere

Constant Permeke (Dutch: [kɔ̃ːˈstɑ̃ː pɛrˈmeːkə] (31 July 1886 – 4 January 1952) was a Belgian painter and sculptor, and part of the Sint-Martens-Latem-based School of Latem, along with Gustave De Smet and Frits Van den Berghe. A leading figure in Flemish Expressionism, he was among the group of artists influenced by elements of Fauvism and Cubism and an interest in both the ethnic and folk traditions of "primitive" art. Together, they built an independent expressionist movement separate from German Expressionism. In 1922, he was named an officer in the Order of Leopold in honor of his military service.

Silenced as an artist, with his work declared degenerate under the Nazi occupation of Belgium (1940–1945), he resumed painting in the late 1940s. From December 1947 to January 1948, a large retrospective of his work was exhibited at the Musée National d'Art Moderne in Paris. Known as the Rétrospective Permeke, the show was also exhibited in Brussels, Amsterdam, and Prague. In 1997, the federal government of Belgium commemorated Permeke by reproducing his portrait and one of his works on the 1,000 Belgian franc bill.

== Career ==
Born in Antwerp, Permeke and his family relocated to Ostend in 1892. In Ostend, his father Henri Permeke, a landscape painter, founded and then curated the Municipal Museum of Arts in 1893.

From 1903 to 1906, Permeke studied at the Bruges Academy of Fine Arts. In 1906, he matriculated at the Royal Academy of Fine Arts in Ghent for the next two years. There, he met Frits Van den Berghe and the brothers Gustave De Smet and Léon De Smet. He was then drafted into the Belgian army and served in a university company headquartered in Sint-Martens-Latem, home of the Latem School, which went on to birth Flemish Expressionism.

After Permeke's military service ended in March 1908, he returned to Ostend where he roomed together with Gustave De Smet. In 1909 he returned to Sint-Martens-Latem where he lived as a recluse. His work of this period is characterized by his heavy brush and gains its expressive force through muted tonality and brutal forms. In 1912, he married Maria Delaere. The newlyweds settled in Ostend, and went on to have both a son and daughter.

In 1921, Permeke exhibited in Antwerp and Paris. Between 1922 and 1924, Permeke regularly went to Astene, in order to cooperate with Frits Van den Berghe. In 1926, Permeke went to Vevey in Switzerland where he mainly painted mountain scenes. In 1929, he moved to Jabbeke. During this period, he subject matter changed: Instead of the fisherman and the sea, he now focused on the farmer and his land. During this period, Permeke was enormously productive producing work like Gouden Oogst (1935), De Grote Marine (1935), Moederschap (1936), Het Afscheid (1948), and Dagelijks Brood (1950).

Permeke began sculpting in 1937. As a sculptor, Permeke tried to isolate the human figure in monumental efforts, in works like: De Zaaier (1939), Niobe (1946), and De Drie Gratiën (1949).

== The War Years ==
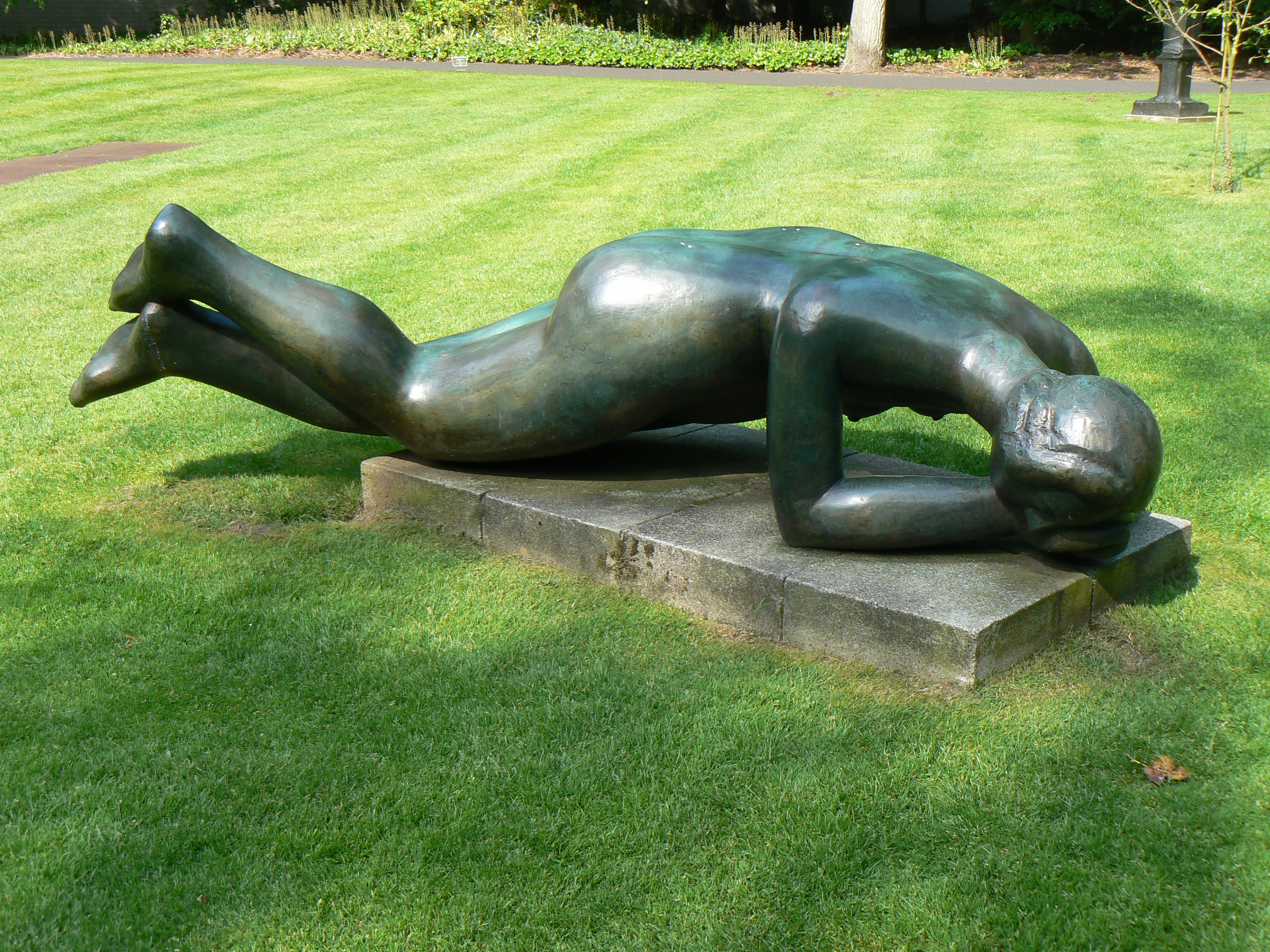
Niobe, sculpture park Kröller-Müller Museum

=== World War I ===
When World War I broke out, Permeke was mobilized. During the defense of Antwerp he was wounded in action near the town of Duffel. His wounds forced his evacuation to the United Kingdom where he was in hospital at South Hillwood. After his release from hospital he was reunited with his family in Folkestone, where his son John was born. In 1916 he moved to Chardstock in Devonshire and started painting again, mostly colorful English landscapes. After the end of the war, the Permeke family returned to Ostend in 1919. In contrast to the happy time in Devonshire, the harsh reality of the worker's life turned Permeke's work back to a gloomier mood as he mainly painted the harsh fisherman's life.

=== World War II ===
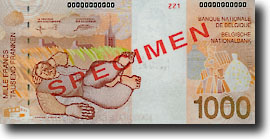
Back

Former Belgian 1,000 franc bill

During World War II, Permeke was declared "degenerate" (Entartete Kunst), and he was forbidden from working. Privately, things were even worse as his son Paul was arrested and sent to Germany as a forced labourer. After the war, Permeke was appointed director of the Royal Academy of Fine Arts in Antwerp, but he resigned after only one year. In 1947–48, Permeke had a big retrospective exhibition in Paris, but his happiness at the return of his son was soon shattered when in 1948 his wife died. Emotionally scarred and ailing, Permeke had to be nursed by his daughter.

== Late Career ==
During the last period of his life, his work mellowed somewhat with more refined drawing and colors. His last works are De dame met de rode handschoenen (1951) and some landscapes painted in Brittany. After his trip there in 1951, his health declined even further, and he became bedridden.

Constant Permeke died on 4 January 1952. Four days later, he was buried next to his wife at the cemetery in Jabbeke. On the grave of his beloved wife was placed a statue which Permeke had commissioned from his friend George Minne.

== Representative Work ==
(Selection was limited by availability.)

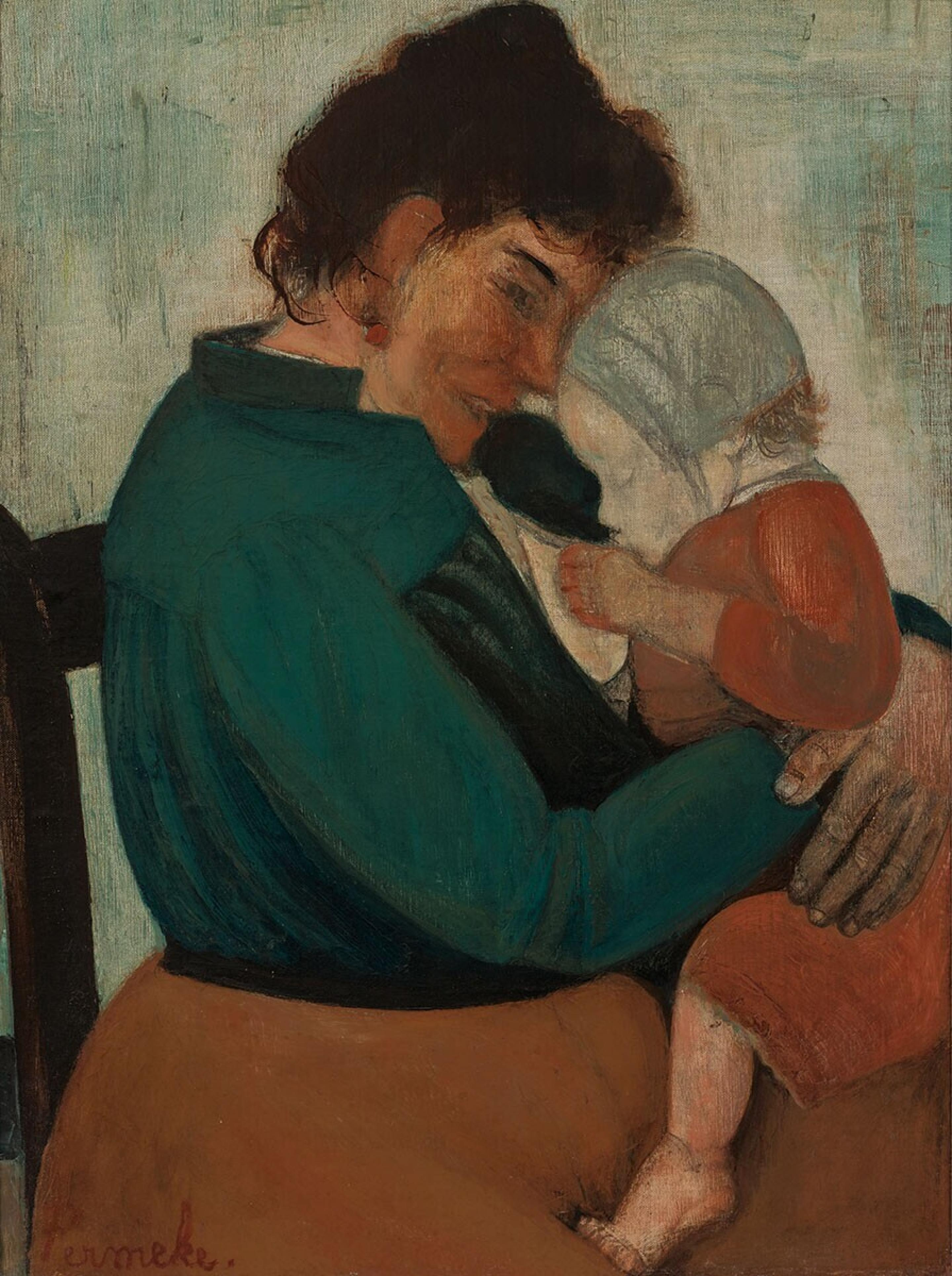
Motherhood (woman from Oostende) (1913)

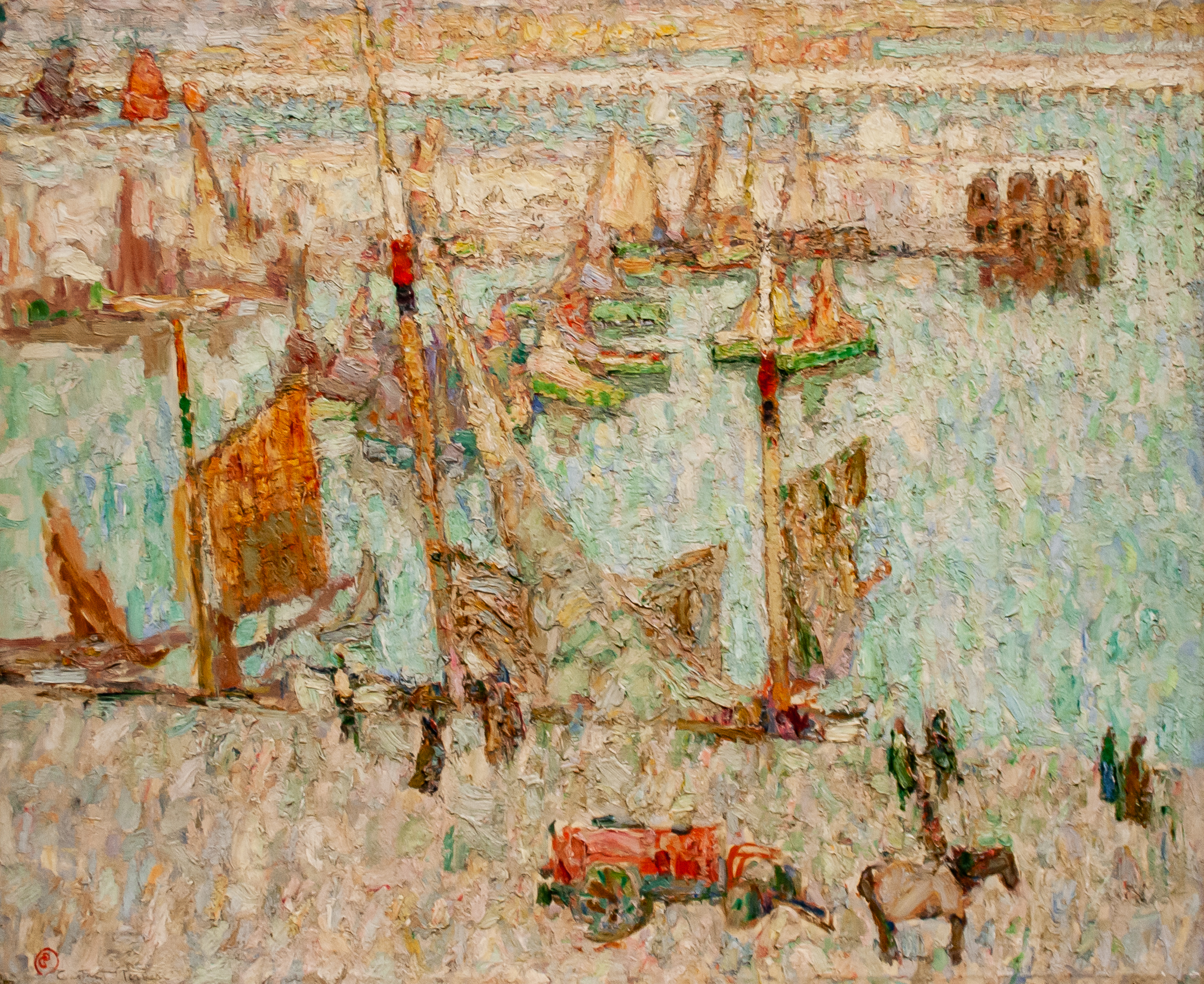
Ostend harbour

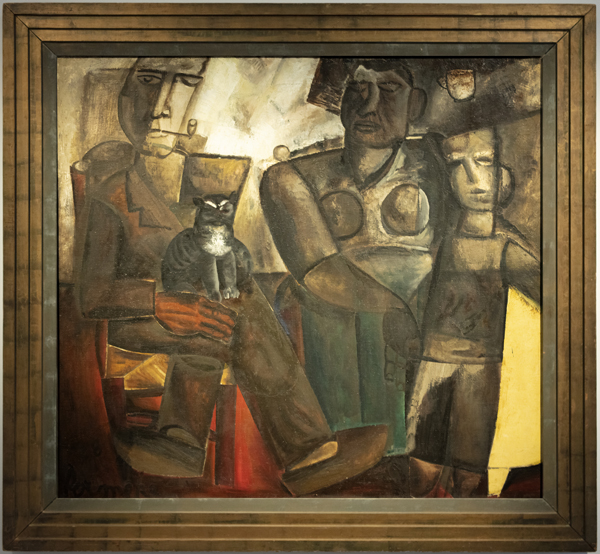
Farmer's family with cat (1928)

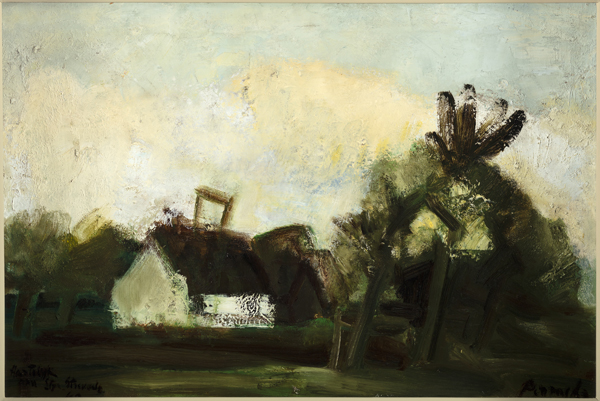
Landscape with mill at Tiegem

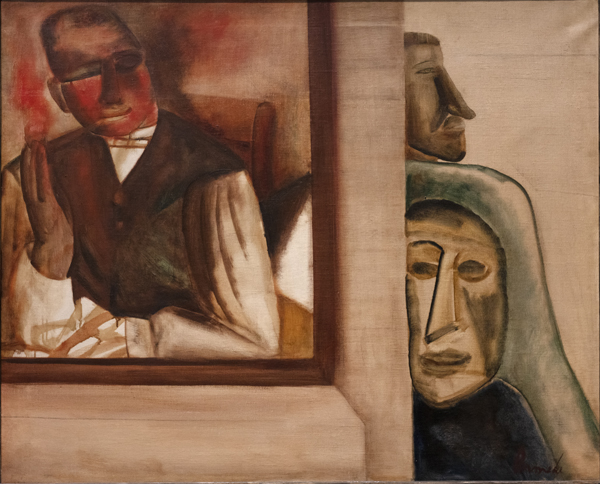
Smoking (c.1927)

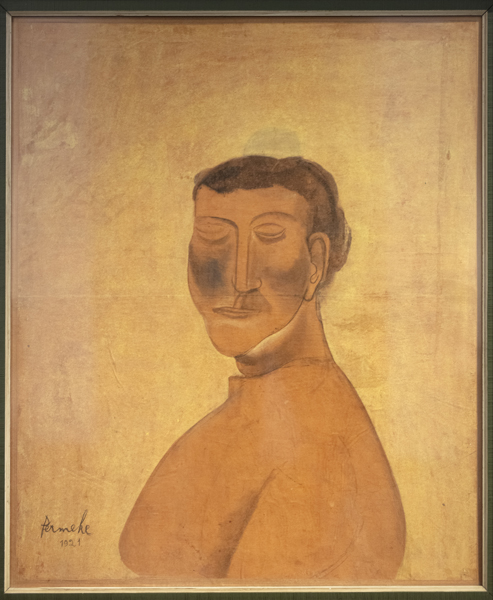
Fisher's wife (1921)

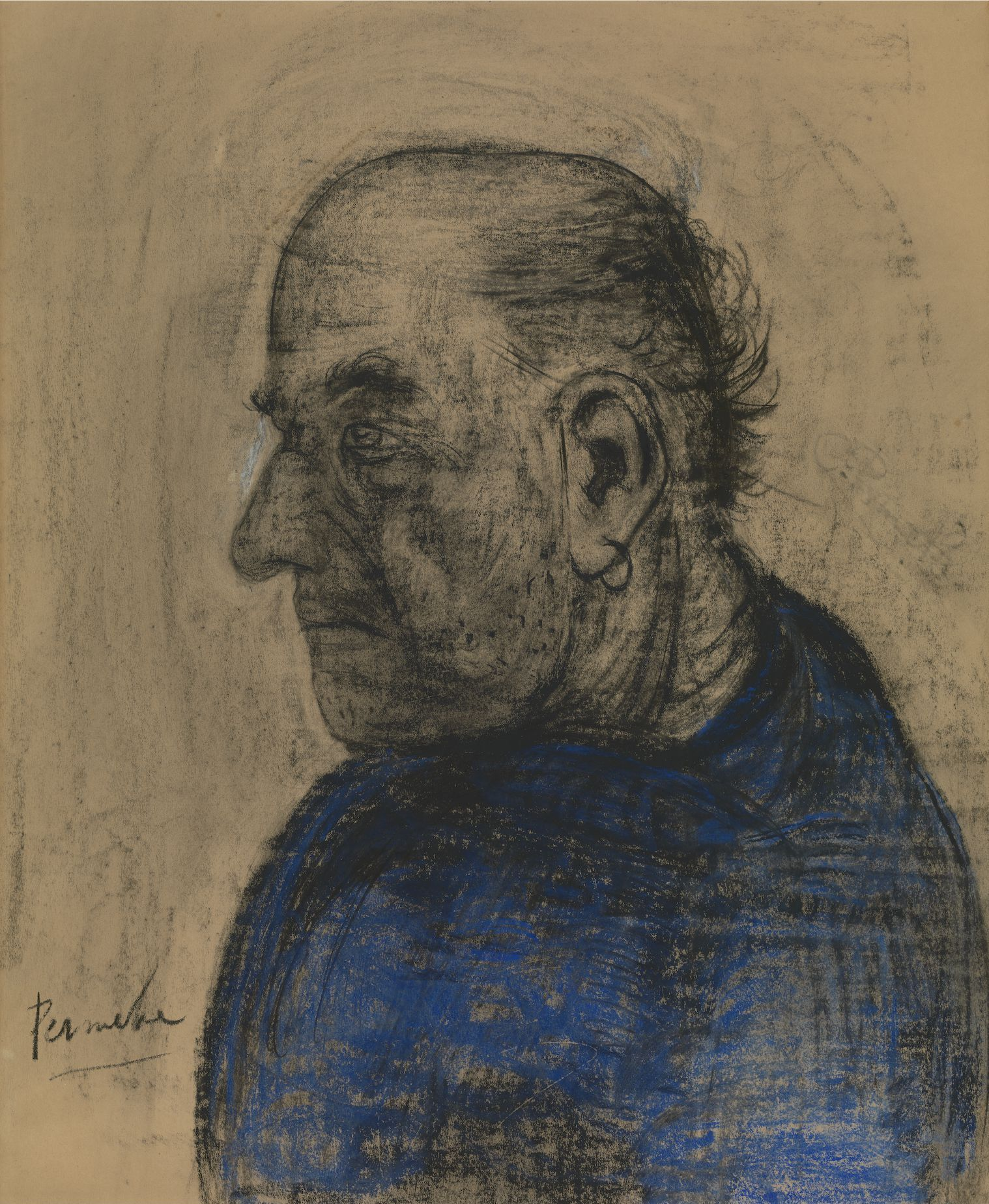
Ostend fisherman

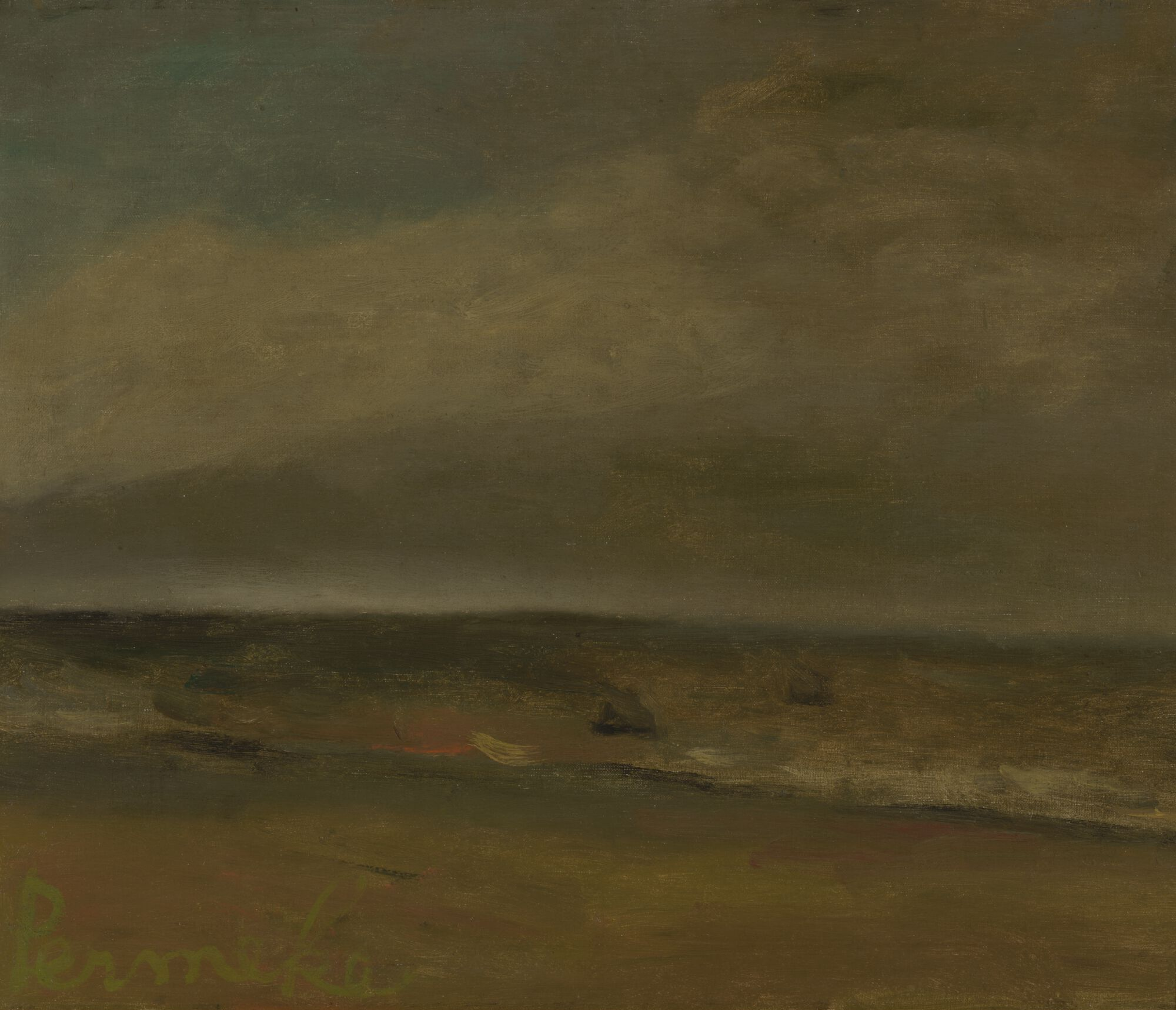
Seascape

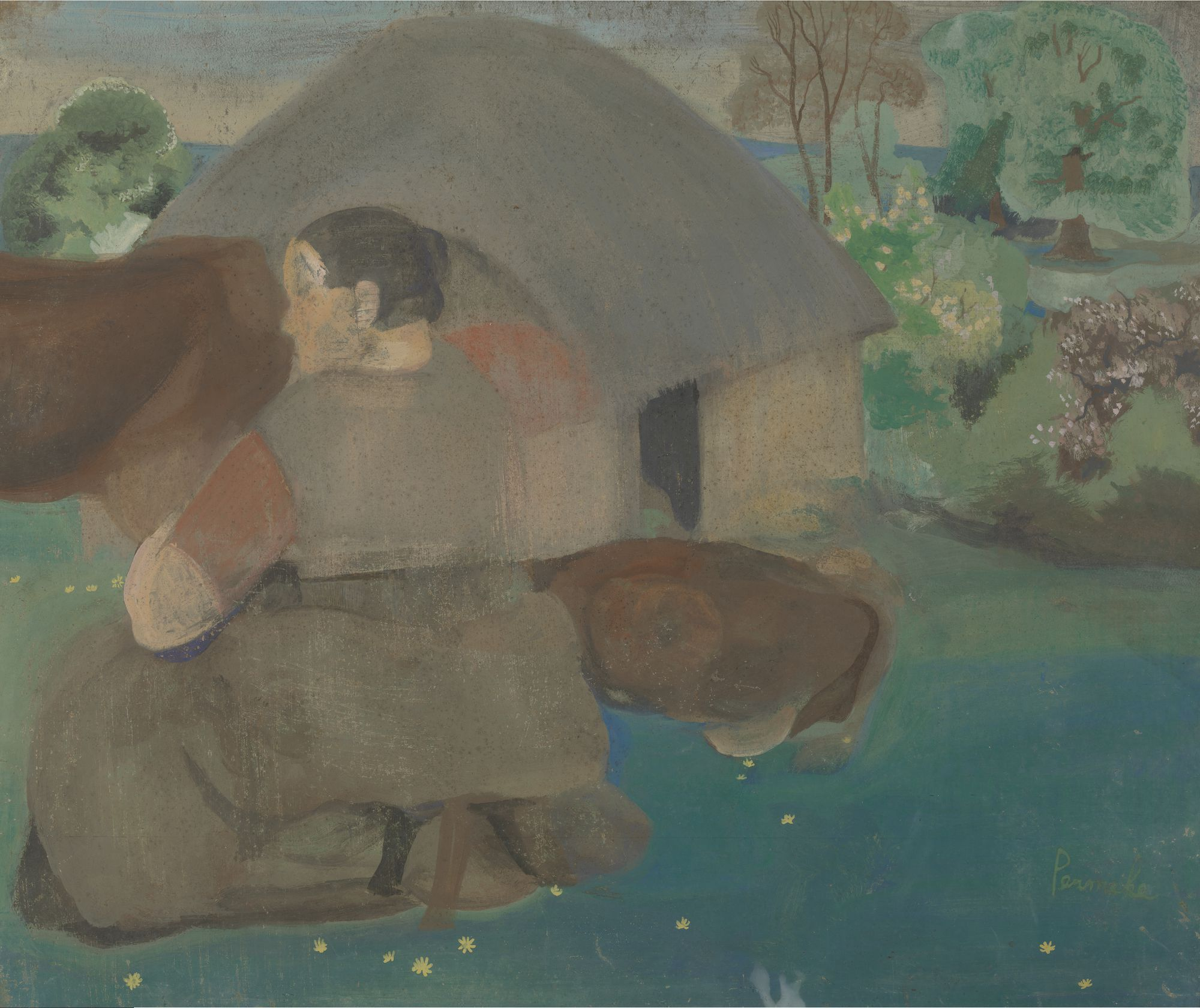
Ode to Flanders

== Honors ==
- 1922: Officer in the Order of Leopold.

== Commemoration ==
In 1997, Belgium recognized Permeke's achievements by having his portrait and one of his works imprinted on the 1,000 Belgian franc bill.
