= Friedrich Heinrich =

Friedrich Heinrich may refer to:

- Carl Friedrich Heinrich Credner (1809–1876), German geologist
- Carl Friedrich Heinrich Graf von Wylich und Lottum (1767–1841), Prussian infantry general
- Friedrich Heinrich Bidder (1810–1894), German physiologist and anatomist
- Friedrich Heinrich Geffcken (1830–1896), German diplomat and jurist
- Friedrich Heinrich Himmel (1765–1814), German composer
- Friedrich Heinrich Jacobi (1743–1819), German philosopher
- Friedrich Heinrich von der Hagen (1780–1856), German philologist
- Julius Friedrich Heinrich Abegg (1796–1868), German criminalist

== See also ==
- Frederick Heinrich
- Frederick Henry (disambiguation)
- Heinrich Friedrich
- Henry Frederick (disambiguation)
