= Pierre Gosselin =

Belgian cyclist

Personal information
- Full name: Pierre Gosselin
- Born: 23 March 1932 (age 94) Hautrage, Belgium

Cycling career
- Sport: Cycling

Pierre Gosselin (born 23 March 1932) is a Belgian cyclist. He competed in the men's tandem event at the 1952 Summer Olympics.
