= Gustavo Martínez (cyclist) =

Guatemalan cyclist (1932–2006)

Gustavo Adolfo Martínez Okrassa
Personal information
- Born: 2 July 1932 Guatemala City, Guatemala
- Died: 19 August 2006 (aged 74) Amherst, Massachusetts, U.S.

Cycling career
- Sport: Cycling

Gustavo Martínez (2 July 1932 – 19 August 2006) was a Guatemalan cyclist. He competed in the men's sprint and 1,000 metres time trial events at the 1952 Summer Olympics in Helsinki. He finished 26th and 24th respectively, in a field of 27.
