= Stéphan Martens =

Belgian cyclist (1931–2013)

Personal information
- Full name: Stéphan Baziel Martens
- Born: 15 December 1931 Astene, Belgium
- Died: 17 December 2013 (aged 82) Deinze, Belgium

Cycling career
- Sport: Cycling

Stéphan Baziel Martens (15 December 1931 – 17 December 2013) was a Belgian cyclist. He competed in the men's sprint event at the 1952 Summer Olympics. Martens died in Deinze on 17 December 2013, at the age of 82.
