= Olaf Holmstrup =

Danish cyclist (1930–2020)

Personal information
- Born: 5 October 1930 Horsens, Denmark
- Died: 11 September 2020 (aged 89)

Cycling career
- Sport: Cycling

Olaf Holmstrup (5 October 1930 – 11 September 2020) was a Danish cyclist. He competed in the men's tandem event at the 1952 Summer Olympics.
