= Helge Törn =

Finnish cyclist

Personal information
- Born: 15 December 1928 Helsinki, Finland
- Died: 3 October 2022 (aged 93)

Cycling career
- Sport: Cycling

Helge Aatos Törn (15 December 1928 – 3 October 2022) was a Finnish cyclist. He competed in the men's sprint event at the 1952 Summer Olympics.
