= Franck Le Normand =

French cyclist (1931–2025)

Personal information
- Born: 22 November 1931 Paris, France
- Died: 30 March 2025 (aged 93) Annecy, France

Cycling career
- Sport: Cycling

Francois Le Normand (22 November 1931 – 30 March 2025) was a French cyclist. He competed in the men's sprint and the tandem events at the 1952 Summer Olympics. Le Normand died on 30 March 2025, at the age of 93.
