= Ensio Nieminen =

Finnish cyclist

Personal information
- Born: 30 March 1930
- Died: 27 September 2008 (aged 78)

Cycling career
- Sport: Cycling

Ensio Nieminen (30 March 1930 – 27 September 2008) was a Finnish cyclist. He competed in the men's tandem event at the 1952 Summer Olympics.
