= Malcolm Simpson =

New Zealand cyclist (1933–2020)

Personal information
- Full name: Clarence Malcolm Simpson
- Born: 26 September 1933 Auckland, New Zealand
- Died: 7 December 2020 (aged 87) Takapuna, New Zealand

Cycling career
- Sport: Cycling

Clarence Malcolm Simpson (26 September 1933 – 7 December 2020) was a New Zealand cyclist who represented his country at the 1952 Olympic Games.

At the 1950 British Empire Games at Auckland he came sixth in the 1 km time trial. At the 1952 Summer Olympics at Helsinki he came 11th in the 1 km time trial and was eliminated in the quarter-finals of the tandem sprint.

Simpson died in Takapuna on 7 December 2020.
