= Ib Vagn Hansen =

Danish cyclist

Personal information
- Full name: Ib Vagn Hansen
- Born: 4 January 1926 Copenhagen, Denmark
- Died: 2000 (aged 73–74)

Cycling career
- Sport: Cycling
- Discipline: Track
- Role: Rider

Ib Vagn Hansen (4 January 1926 – 2000) was a Danish cyclist. He competed in the 1,000 metres time trial event at the 1952 Summer Olympics.
