= Ove Krogh Rants =

Danish cyclist (1926–2023)

Personal information
- Full name: Ove Krogh Rants
- Born: 14 August 1926 Copenhagen, Denmark
- Died: 24 April 2023 (aged 96)

Cycling career
- Sport: Cycling

Ove Krogh Rants (14 August 1926 – 24 April 2023) was a Danish cyclist. He competed in the men's sprint event at the 1952 Summer Olympics. Rants died on 24 April 2023, at the age of 96.
