= Kihei (disambiguation) =

Kihei may refer to:

- Kihei, Hawaii, a place in Maui County, Hawaii, U.S.
- Kihei Clark (born 2000), a Filipino-American college basketball player
- Kihei Tomioka (富岡 喜平, 1932–2007), Japanese cyclist
- Kihei, one of the Hiruma Brothers, characters in Rurouni Kenshin

== See also ==
- Kiheitai
