= Leslie Wilson (cyclist) =

British cyclist (1926–2006)

Personal information
- Born: 3 January 1926 Leeds, England
- Died: 20 January 2006 (aged 80)

Cycling career
- Sport: Cycling
- Role: he was an engineer

Leslie Wilson (3 January 1926 – 20 January 2006) was a British cyclist. He competed in the men's tandem event at the 1952 Summer Olympics.
