= Lev Tsipursky =

Soviet cyclist

Personal information
- Born: 7 September 1929 Moscow, Soviet Union
- Died: 7 January 1985 (aged 55) Moscow, Soviet Union

Cycling career
- Sport: Cycling

Lev Tsipursky (7 September 1929 – 7 January 1985) was a Soviet cyclist. He competed in the 1,000 metres time trial event at the 1952 Summer Olympics.
