= Otar Dadunashvili =

Georgian-Soviet cyclist

Personal information
- Born: 21 March 1928
- Died: 28 August 1992 (aged 64)

Cycling career
- Sport: Cycling

Otar Dadunashvili (21 March 1928 – 28 August 1992) was a Georgian-Soviet cyclist. He competed in the men's sprint event at the 1952 Summer Olympics.
