= Fredy Arber =

Swiss cyclist

Personal information
- Full name: Alfred Arber
- Born: 24 August 1928

Cycling career
- Sport: Cycling

Fredy Arber (born 24 August 1928) is a Swiss cyclist. He competed in the men's tandem and 1,000 metres time trial events at the 1952 Summer Olympics.
