= Antonio Giménez =

Argentine cyclist

Personal information
- Nickname: Antonio Giménez
- Born: 25 June 1931

Cycling career
- Sport: Cycling

Antonio Giménez (born 25 June 1931) is an Argentine cyclist. He competed in the men's sprint event at the 1952 Summer Olympics.
