= Jens Juul Eriksen =

Danish cyclist (1926–2004)

Personal information
- Full name: Jens Juul Eriksen
- Born: 9 July 1926 Aarhus, Denmark
- Died: 29 July 2004 (aged 78) Beden, Denmark

Cycling career
- Sport: Cycling
- Discipline: Track
- Role: Rider

Jens Juul Eriksen (9 July 1926 – 29 July 2004) was a Danish cyclist. He competed in the men's tandem event at the 1952 Summer Olympics.
