= Zdeněk Košta =

Czech cyclist (1923–2020)

Personal information
- Born: 30 May 1923
- Died: 11 October 2020 (aged 97) Prague, Czech Republic

Cycling career
- Sport: Cycling

Zdeněk Košta (30 May 1923 – 11 October 2020) was a Czech cyclist. He competed in the men's sprint event at the 1952 Summer Olympics.

Košta died in Prague on 11 October 2020, at the age of 97.
