= Onni Kasslin =

Finnish cyclist

Personal information
- Born: 27 February 1927 Vantaa, Finland
- Died: 9 August 2003 (aged 76) Helsinki, Finland

Cycling career
- Sport: Cycling

Onni Kasslin (27 February 1927 – 9 August 2003) was a Finnish cyclist. He competed at the 1948 and 1952 Summer Olympics.
