= Astene =

- Village
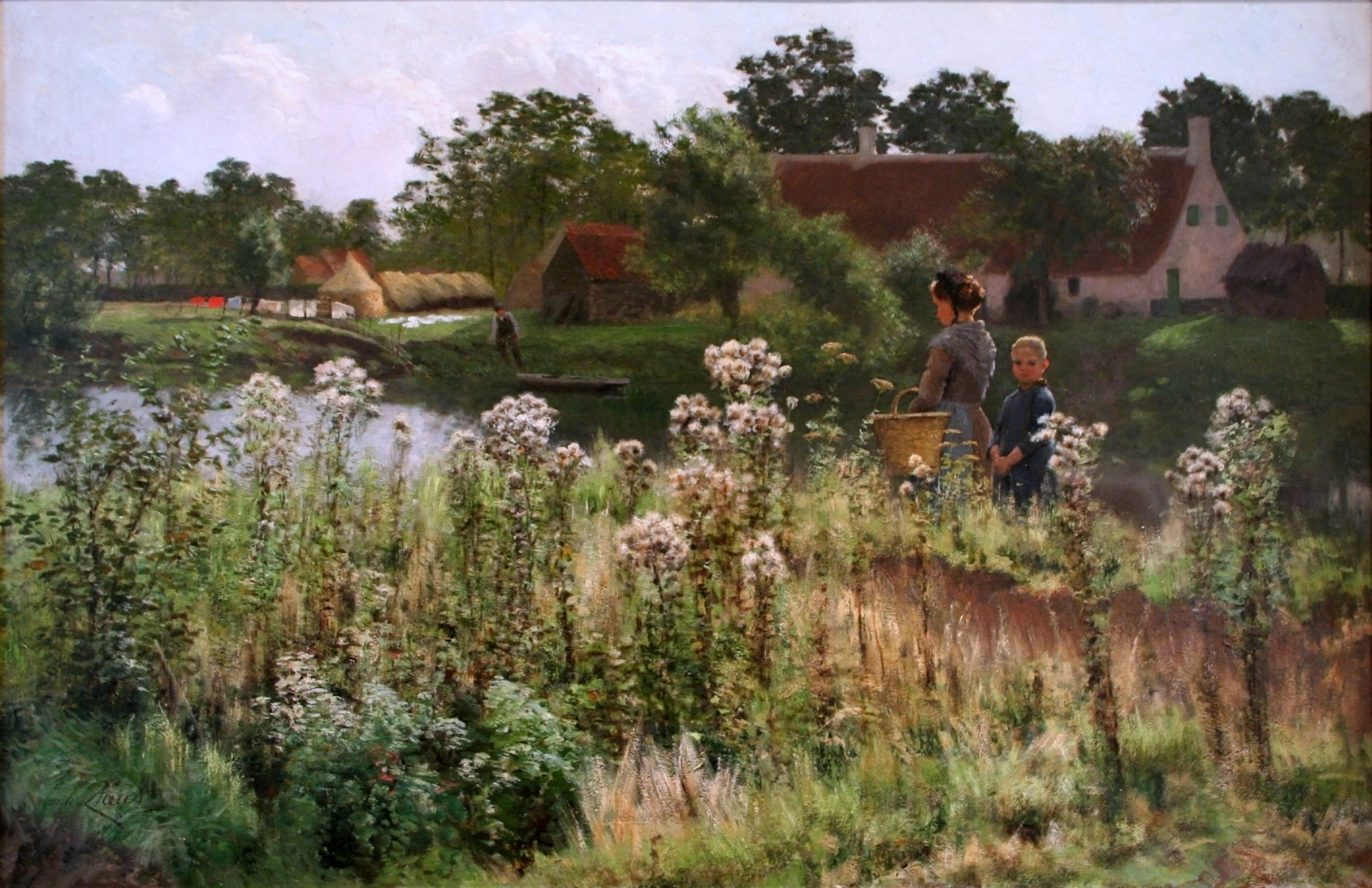
- The River Leie in Astene by Emile Claus (1885)

- Location in Belgium
- Coordinates: 50.9828°N 3.5629°E
- Country: Belgium
- Province: East Flanders
- Municipality: Deinze

Area
  - Total: 9.58 km^{2} (3.70 sq mi)

Population (2021)
  - Total: 5,010
  - Density: 523/km^{2} (1,350/sq mi)
- Time zone: CET

Astene is a village and deelgemeente (sub-municipality) in the municipality of Deinze in the Belgian province of East Flanders. The village is located along the Leie River and about 13 kilometres (8.1 mi) south-west of Ghent.

== History ==
The village was first mentioned in the 7th century as Athenneria. The etymology is unclear. The area has been inhabited since the Roman era, and graves have been discovered dating between 50 and 150 AD. The old parish church was located on the Kapelleberg, a dune near the Leie River, and was first mentioned in 1147. The village heerlijkheid (landed estate) used to belong to the Margraviate of Deinze, but the area also contained several other smaller heerlijkheden. In 1582, during the Dutch Revolt, the village was destroyed except for three houses and the area was nearly depopulated.

Around 1720, the road from Ghent to Kortrijk was constructed, and the centre moved from near the river to a linear settlement along the road. In 1834, a new parish church was built along the road. In 1838, a railway station opened on the Ghent to Mouscron (border with France) railway line, and the village started to industrialise. There are several bunkers in the area from the 1930s which were constructed as part of a defensive line between the Scheldt and the Leie. After World War II, Astene started to become a residential town.

Astene was an independent municipality until 1971, when it was merged into Deinze.

== Buildings ==
The St Amandus and St Job Church was built between 1834 and 1836 to replace the old and dilapidated parish church. The old church was demolished in 1836. The new church is a three aisled basilica-like church which was extended in 1878. During World War I, the tower was blown up and the church was severely damaged. It was restored and rebuilt in 1920. During World War II, it was again severely damaged. The church was restored and a new tower was built between 1948 and 1954.

== Notable people ==
- Emile Claus (1849–1924), painter
- Stéphan Martens (born 1931), cyclist

== Gallery ==
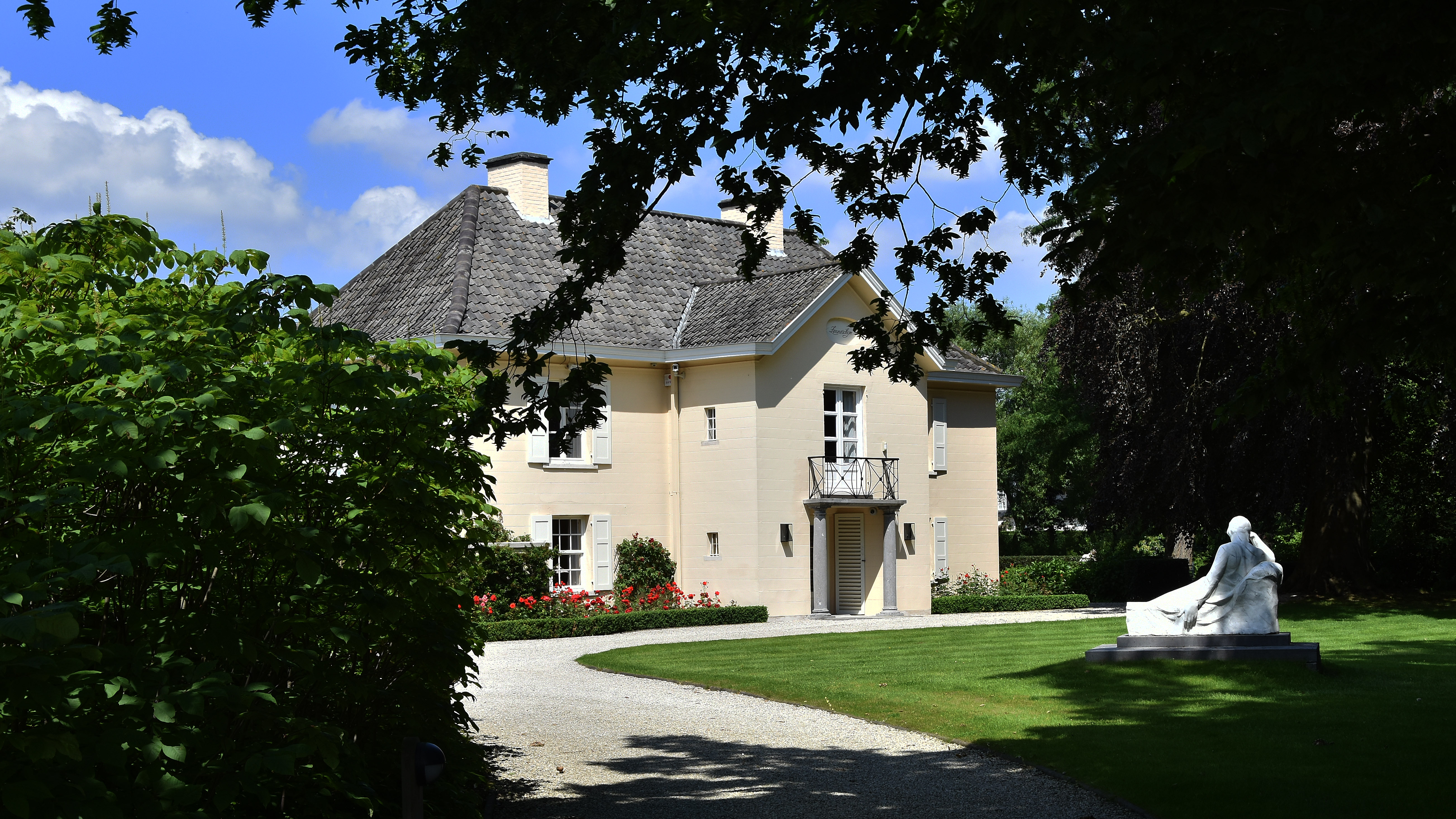
Villa Sunshine

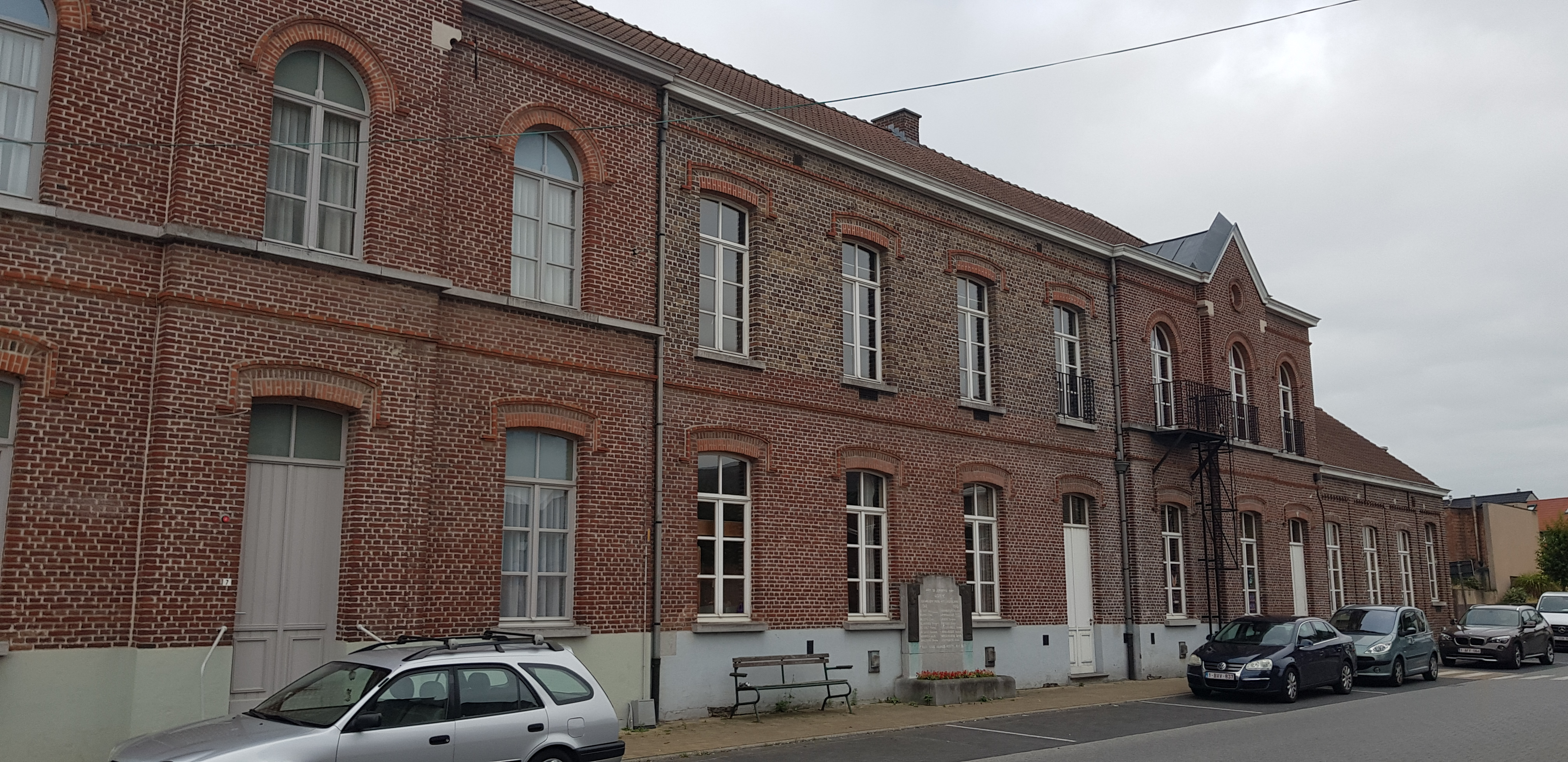
Former combined town hall and school

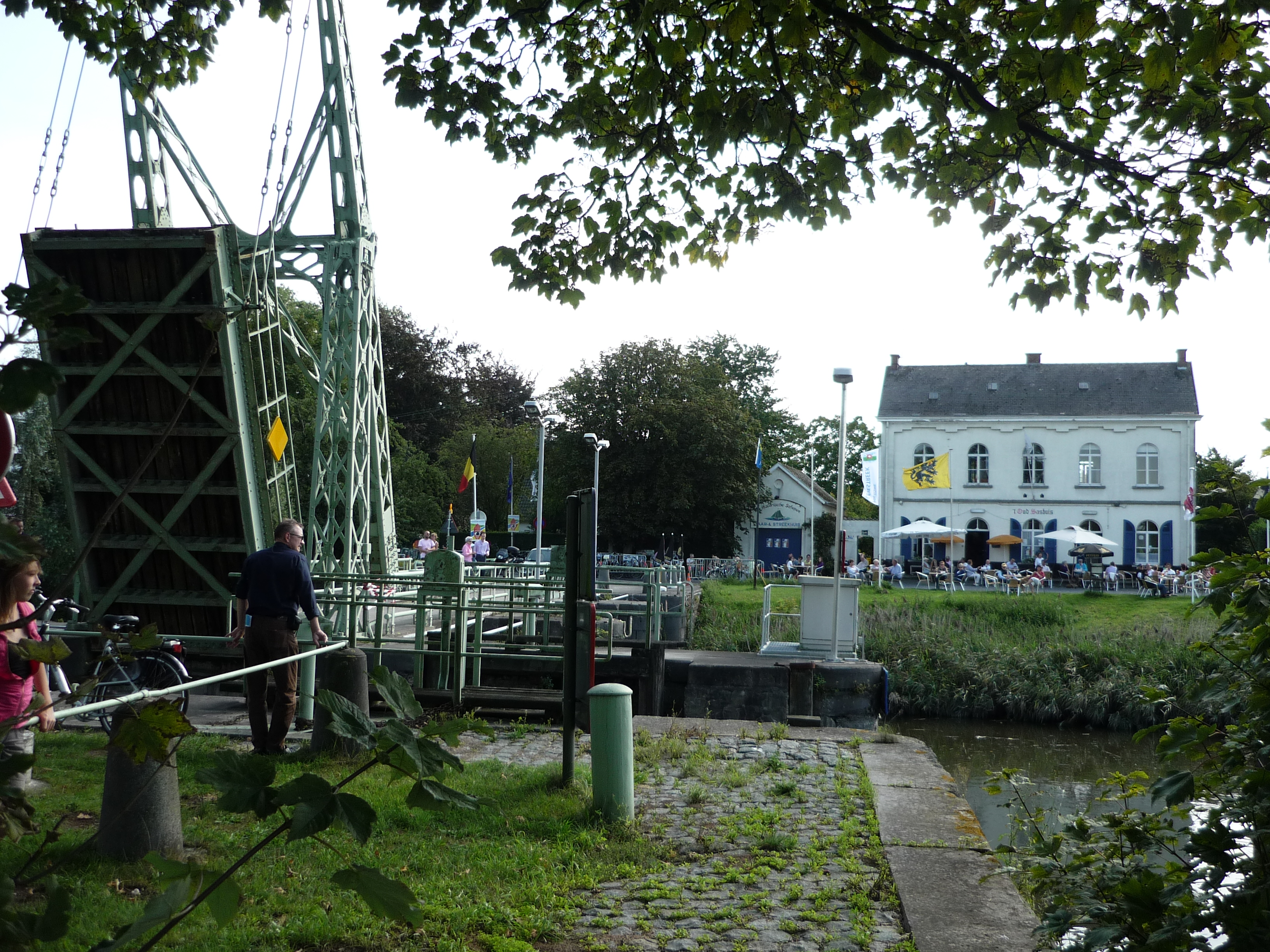
The sas (lock) of Astene

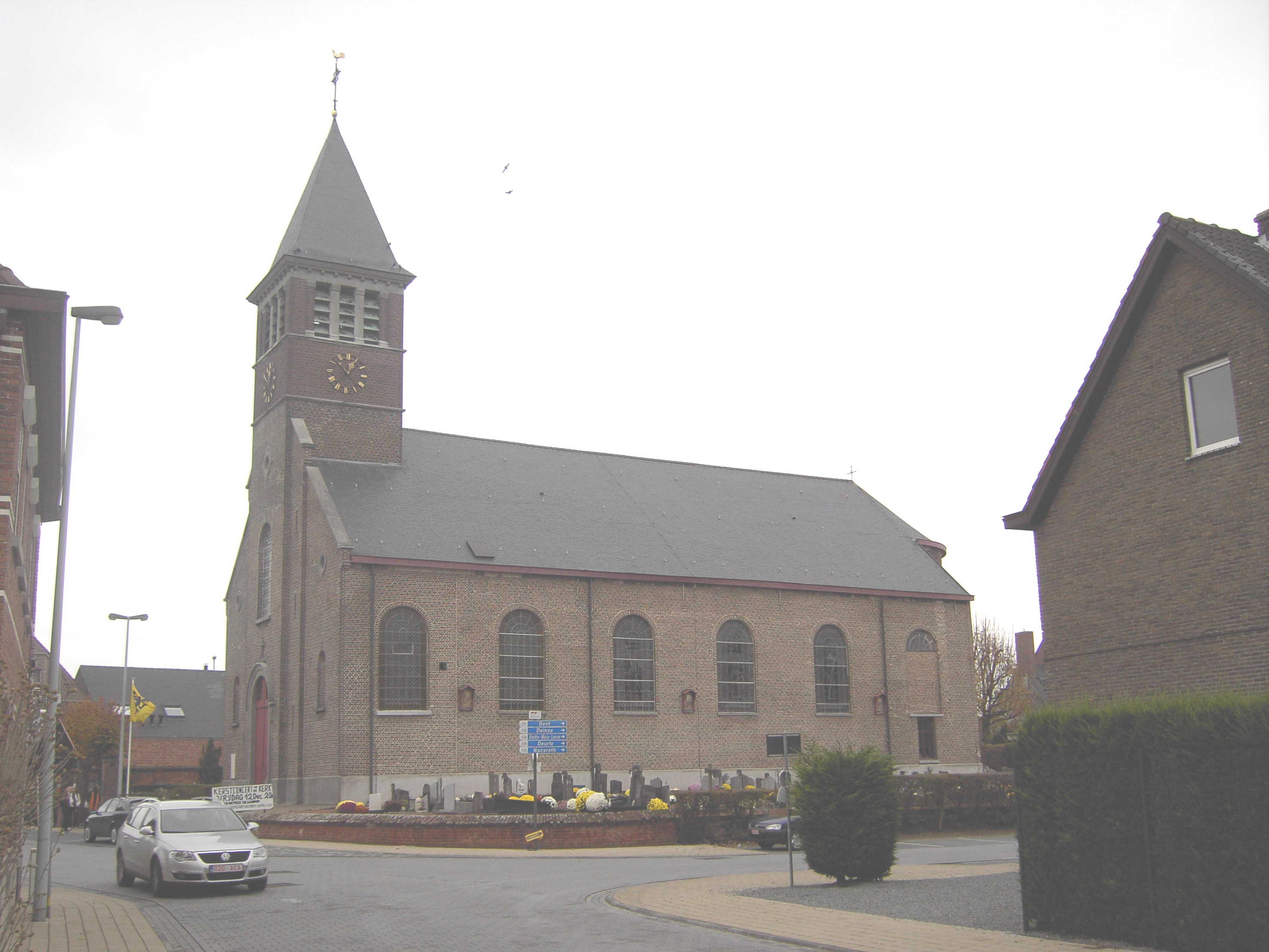
St Amandus and St Job Church
