= Enzo Sacchi =

Italian cyclist (1926–1988)

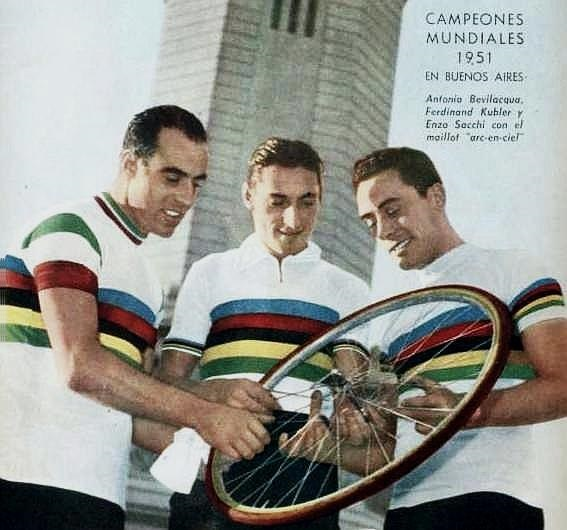
- Antonio Bevilacqua, Ferdinand Kübler and Sacchi in 1951

Personal information
- Full name: Enzo Sacchi
- Born: 6 January 1926 Florence, Italy
- Died: 12 July 1988 (aged 62) Florence, Italy

Cycling career
- Sport: Cycling
- Disciplines: Road and track
- Role: Rider
- Rider type: Sprinter
Medal record
Men's track cycling
Representing Italy
Olympic Games
| Gold medal – first place | 1952 Helsinki | Sprint Scratch Race |

Enzo Sacchi (6 January 1926 – 12 July 1988) was an Italian road bicycle and track cyclist, who won the gold medal in the men's 1,000 metre sprint scratch race at the 1952 Summer Olympics in Helsinki, Finland.

Sacchi was born in Florence, where he also died. He was a professional rider from 1952 to 1965.
