= Harold Cleghorn =

New Zealand weightlifter (1912–1996)

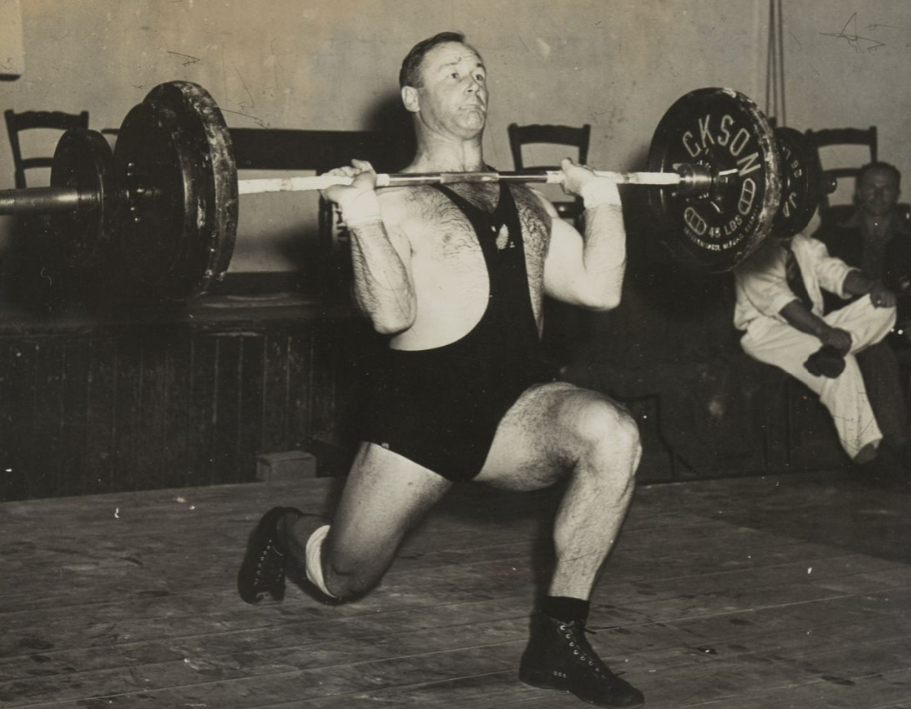
- Cleghorn winning gold in 1950; Auckland Libraries Heritage Collections

Personal information
- Born: Robert Harold Cleghorn; 27 December 1912 Auckland, New Zealand
- Died: 10 October 1996 (aged 83)
- Weight: 109 kg (240 lb)

Sport
- Country: New Zealand
- Sport: Weightlifting

Achievements and titles
- National finals: Middle heavyweight champion (1955); Heavyweight champion (1937, 1938, 1939, 1940, 1949, 1950, 1951, 1952, 1953, 1954)
Medal record
Commonwealth Games
Gold medal – first place	1950 Auckland	110 kg
Bronze medal – third place	1954 Vancouver	110 kg

Robert Harold Cleghorn (27 December 1912 – 10 October 1996) was a weightlifting competitor for New Zealand.

He won the gold medal at the 1950 British Empire Games in the men's 110 kg division. At the 1954 British Empire Games, he won the bronze medal in the same event.

He represented New Zealand at the 1952 Summer Olympics where he placed 7th overall in the men's heavyweight.

Cleghorn won 11 New Zealand national weightlifting championship titles: in the heavyweight division in consecutive years from 1937 to 1940, and then again from 1949 to 1954; and in the middle heavyweight division in 1955.
