= Dino Costa =

American radio talk show host

- Occupation: Radio personality

Dino Costa is a former American talk radio host, mostly recently with KFNS 590 "The Fan" in St. Louis, Missouri. He is the former host of The Dino Costa Show broadcast over Sirius XM Radio from 2009 to 2013.

== Career ==
Costa entered the radio business full-time in 1997, when he became the lead play-by-play broadcaster for a Houston Astros affiliate in the Class A Midwest League in Davenport, Iowa. Costa has done talk radio in various markets, including Huntington and Wheeling in West Virginia. Additionally, Costa has hosted his own radio shows in Jacksonville, Florida, and Denver, Colorado, where he broadcast a statewide show concurrent with hosting his own television sports show on FSN Rocky Mountain (Raw Sports With Dino Costa). Costa was an in-studio post-game show analyst for Colorado Rockies telecasts on FSN, appearing on 40 telecasts per season for the 2006–07 seasons. Costa hosted a 10-part series on The Madison Square Garden Network in 2011; 'Who Wore It Best.' The show was the recipient of a New York Emmy Award.

The Dino Costa Show debuted nationally on SiriusXM Radio in September 2009. While at SiriusXM Radio, Costa was named one of the best sports talk hosts in America by Sports Illustrated magazine, and one of the top 100 sports hosts in America by Talkers Magazine. In July 2012, he defied SiriusXM management and moved his show from Manhattan to Cheyenne, Wyoming. In October 2012, Men's Journal printed a feature story about Costa, "the Angriest Man on the Airwaves," describing how Costa mixed white bigotry and male sexism with Tea Party politics and conservative religious morality to arrive at his successful formula for an angry sports-talk-radio personality. In October 2013, Costa was fired from SXM because of philosophical differences with management about the direction of the show, as well as friction caused by what Costa complained was a lack of promotion and visibility for his show.

Costa put together his own version of the Dino Costa Show, to be broadcast from a studio in Cheyenne, Wyoming, funded by $250,000 provided by two investors who were former listeners. Subscribers would pay fees of $72 per year, and Costa predicted that 2500 subscribers would allow the project to break even. The show was based on the website dinocostaproject.com which went live on May 5, 2014. In December 2014, the primary investor, Anthony Menicola, closed down the project, deleted the website and issued a statement saying that the show had been difficult to operate, unsuccessful in making money, and that there were only 543 subscribers at the maximum.

Costa joined St Louis sports talk station KFNS (AM) "The Fan" in early 2016 but was fired after just six weeks. Station owner Randy Markel said about Costa, "I like Dino, he’s like your crazy brother you have to bail out of jail... He’s very talented. But it’s the BS that comes along with him that’s hard to take."

Costa worked for Portland's KXTG "The Game" during the afternoon commute slot starting in June 2017, but he was fired two months later after suggesting that his listeners could run their cars over Black Lives Matter protesters.

On January 2, 2018, it was announced on the WNYM website that Costa would be broadcasting Sports Overnight four days a week from midnight to 3 am Tuesday through Friday. Costa left the New York gig when it failed to bring him the money he was expecting. In November 2018, he was back at KFNS in St Louis.

== Personal life ==
Costa says he had a tough childhood, with a violent father. He has worked a variety of odd jobs. Costa has been married three times. He has a son with his third wife.
