= Fritz Siegenthaler =

Swiss cyclist (1929–2024)

Personal information
- Born: 18 March 1929 Zurich, Switzerland
- Died: 9 August 2024 (aged 95)

Cycling career
- Sport: Cycling

Fritz Siegenthaler (18 March 1929 – 9 August 2024) was a Swiss cyclist. He competed in the men's sprint and the tandem events at the 1952 Summer Olympics. Siegenthaler died on 9 August 2024, at the age of 95.
