= Steven Hromjak =

American cyclist (born 1930)

Personal information
- Born: April 25, 1930 (age 96) Cleveland, Ohio, U.S.

Cycling career
- Sport: Cycling

Steven Hromjak (born April 25, 1930) is an American cyclist. He competed in two events at the 1952 Summer Olympics.

He won the 1952 United States Cycling National Championships.
