= Robert Vidal (cyclist) =

French cyclist

Personal information
- Born: 3 July 1933 (age 93)

Cycling career
- Sport: Cycling

Robert Vidal (born 7 July 1933) is a former French cyclist. He competed at the 1952 and 1956 Summer Olympics.
