= Olavi Linnonmaa =

Finnish cyclist

Personal information
- Born: 30 May 1920 Helsinki, Finland
- Died: 25 May 1995 (aged 74) Helsinki, Finland

Cycling career
- Sport: Cycling

Olavi Linnonmaa (30 May 1920 – 25 May 1995) was a Finnish cyclist. He competed in the men's tandem event at the 1952 Summer Olympics.
