= Frederick Henry (cyclist) =

Canadian cyclist

Personal information
- Born: December 14, 1929 Toronto, Ontario, Canada
- Died: October 16, 2013 (aged 83) Decatur, Georgia, U.S.

Cycling career
- Sport: Cycling

Frederick Charles Henry (December 14, 1929 – October 16, 2013) was a Canadian cyclist. He competed in the 1,000 metres time trial event at the 1952 Summer Olympics.
