= Lionel Cox (cyclist) =

Australian cyclist (1930 –2010)

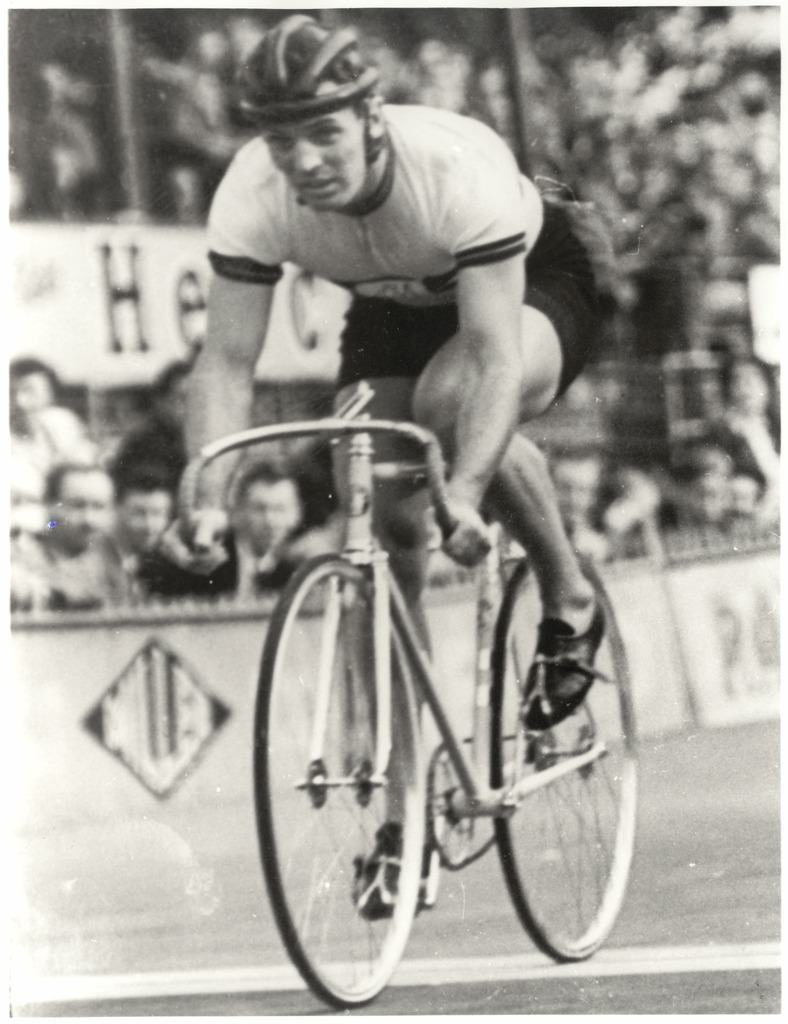

Personal information
- Full name: Lionel Malvyne Cox
- Born: 5 December 1930; Brisbane
- Died: 9 March 2010 (aged 79); Sydney

Cycling career
- Sport: Cycling
- Discipline: Track
- Role: Rider
Medal record
Men's cycling
Representing Australia
Olympic Games
Gold medal – first place	1952 Helsinki	Tandem
Silver medal – second place	1952 Helsinki	Sprint Scratch Race

Lionel Malvyne Cox OAM (5 December 1930 – 9 March 2010) was an Australian Olympic track cyclist.

== Career highlights ==
1948 – 49
1st N.S.W. 1000 metre Sprint Title
1949 – 50
1st N.S.W. 1000 metre Sprint Title
1950 – 51
1st Henson Park 5 mile Championship
1st N.S.W 1000 1 mile Sprint Championship
1950 – 51
1st N.S.W 1000 metre Sprint Championship
1st Henson Park 1 mile Championship
1st Australian 1 mile Championship
1951 – 52
1st N.S.W 1 mile Sprint Championship
1st N.S.W 1000 metre Sprint Championship
1st Dead Heat 1000 N.S.W Time Trial
2nd 1000 mere Australian Sprint Championship
1952
4th Grand Prix - Paris
Silver Medal (2nd) Olympic Sprint Championship – Helsinki, Finland
Gold Medal (1st) Olympic Tandem Championship (Russell Mockridge) – Helsinki, Finland
Top All Round Point Scorer - Denmark
1953
All Round International Point Scorer – Aaurnus, Denmark
3rd Grand Prix – Paris
1st Grand Prix – Hanover, Germany
1st Grand Prix – Aaurnus, Denmark
1st International Match Race – Aaurnus, Denmark
4th World Championships – Switzerland
4 Records broken, Denmark Amateur and Professional
Broke 1000 Sprint records – Denmark
Broke 1000 metre Sprint records – Odese, Denmark 11-7
1954
1st Victorian 1000 metre Sprint Championship
1st Victorian 1 mile Sprint Championship
1st Victorian 1000 metre Time Trial Championship
1955
1st N.S.W Time Trial Championship
1st N.S.W 1000 metre Sprint Championship

== Professional career ==
Cox turned professional in 1956.

== Return to amateur status and coaching ==
In 1958 Cox applied to be reinstated as an amateur and this was granted. Cox coached at Camperdown and then Tempe, guiding riders to State, national and International success.

== Honours and awards ==
In 1993 Cox was inducted into the Sports Australia Hall of Fame in recognition of his achievements for cycling.

In 1999, Cox was awarded the Medal of the Order of Australia (OAM) for his service to cycling particularly as a coach and a former competitor.
