= Imre Furmen =

Hungarian cyclist (1933–2021)

Personal information
- Born: 14 August 1933 Budapest, Hungary
- Died: 5 February 2021 (aged 87)

Cycling career
- Sport: Cycling

Imre Furmen (14 August 1933 – 5 February 2021) was a Hungarian cyclist. He competed in two events at the 1952 Summer Olympics.

He died on 5 February 2021.
