= John Millman (cyclist) =

Canadian cyclist (1930–2021)

Personal information
- Full name: John Earl Millman
- Born: August 4, 1930 Portland, Oregon, U.S.
- Died: June 12, 2021 (aged 90) Middlesbrough, England

Cycling career
- Sport: Cycling

John Earl Millman (August 4, 1930 – June 12, 2021) was a Canadian cyclist. He competed in the men's sprint event at the 1952 Summer Olympics. He also competed in the men's 10 mile scratch and 1 km time trials at the 1950 British Empire (Commonwealth) Games in Auckland, New Zealand, and was a heat winner of the 1000m Match Sprint at the 1954 British Empire (Commonwealth) Games in Vancouver, Canada. Millman died in Middlesbrough, England on June 12, 2021, at the age of 90.
