= Béla Szekeres (cyclist) =

Hungarian cyclist

Personal information
- Born: 1933 (age 92–93) Budapest, Hungary

Cycling career
- Sport: Cycling

Béla Szekeres (born 1933) is a Hungarian cyclist. He competed in the men's sprint event at the 1952 Summer Olympics.
