= Steve Kosta =

Australian rugby league footballer

Personal information
- Full name: Steven Kosta
- Born: 28 July 1950 (age 75) Sydney, New South Wales, Australia

Playing information
- Position: Centre, Second-row, Wing
Club
Years	Team	Pld	T	G	FG	P
1971–73	South Sydney	28	11	0	0	33
1974–78	Newtown Jets	75	15	0	0	45
	Total	103	26	0	0	78
- Source: As of 5 June 2019

Steve Kosta is an Australian former rugby league footballer who played in the 1970s. He played for the Newtown Jets and the South Sydney Rabbitohs in the New South Wales Rugby League (NSWRL) competition.

== Playing career ==
Kosta made his first-grade debut for South Sydney in 1971. Kosta made a total of 4 appearances for Souths but was not included in the grand final side, which won their 20th premiership defeating St George in the final 16–10. The premiership victory would be the club's last for 43 years.

In 1972, Kosta featured more prominently for Souths and played in the club's elimination final loss against St George, ending their premiership defence. In 1974, Kosta joined Newtown, but his time was not as successful as when he played for Souths, with Newtown failing to make the finals and finishing last on the table in 1976, 1977 and 1978.
