= Ken Farnum =

Jamaican cyclist (1931–2020)

Personal information
- Full name: Kenneth Aubrey Farnum
- Born: 18 January 1931 Barbados
- Died: 4 April 2020 (aged 89) New York City, New York, U.S.

Cycling career
- Sport: Cycling

Kenneth Aubrey Farnum (18 January 1931 – 4 April 2020) was a Jamaican cyclist. He competed in the men's sprint and 1,000 metres time trial events at the 1952 Summer Olympics.

He died on 4 April 2020, in New York City from complications of COVID-19.
