= Colin Dickinson =

New Zealand cyclist (1931–2006)

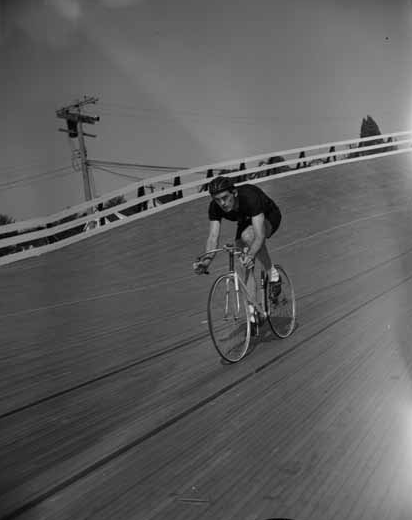
- At the 1954 British Empire and Commonwealth Games; Attribution:Province newspaper

Personal information
- Full name: Colin Healey Dickinson
- Born: 14 October 1931 Wanganui, New Zealand
- Died: 9 August 2006 (aged 74)

Cycling career
- Sport: Cycling

Colin Healey Dickinson (14 October 1931 – 9 August 2006) was a New Zealand cyclist. He competed in the men's sprint and the tandem events at the 1952 Summer Olympics.

In 1990, Dickinson was awarded the New Zealand 1990 Commemoration Medal.
