= Luis Toro =

Venezuelan cyclist

Personal information
- Born: 21 September 1925

Cycling career
- Sport: Cycling

Luis Toro (born 21 September 1925) is a Venezuelan cyclist. He competed in two events at the 1952 Summer Olympics.
