= Frederick Henry =

Frederick Henry may refer to:

- Frederick Henry, Prince of Orange (1584–1647), Prince of Orange and stadtholder of Holland, Zeeland, Utrecht, Guelders, and Overijssel
- Frederick Henry, Duke of Saxe-Zeitz-Pegau-Neustadt (1668–1713), German prince of the House of Wettin
- Frederick Henry, Margrave of Brandenburg-Schwedt (1709–1788), last owner of the Prussian secundogeniture of Brandenburg-Schwedt
- Frederick Henry of Nassau-Siegen (1651–1676)
- Frederick Henry, Hereditary Prince of the Palatinate (1614–1629)
- Frederick Henry (cyclist) (1929–2013), Canadian Olympic cyclist
- Frederick Henry (bishop) (1943–2024), Roman Catholic bishop in Calgary, Canada
- F. C. Henry (Frederick Charles Henry), British trade unionist and political activist
- Frederick F. Henry (1919–1950), Medal of Honor recipient
- Snake Henry (1895–1987), American baseball player and manager, born Frederick Marshall Henry

== See also ==
- Frederick Henry Bay, in Tasmania
