= Raymond Robinson (cyclist) =

South African cyclist (1929–2018)

Personal information
- Full name: Raymond Leonard Robinson
- Nickname: Ray
- Born: 3 September 1929 Johannesburg, South Africa
- Died: 4 January 2018 (aged 88)

Cycling career
- Sport: Cycling
Medal record
Men's cycling
Representing South Africa
Olympic Games
Silver medal – second place	1952 Helsinki	2,000m Tandem
Bronze medal – third place	1952 Helsinki	1,000m Time Trial

Raymond Leonard "Ray" Robinson (3 September 1929 – 4 January 2018) was a South African cyclist. He competed at the 1952 and 1956 Summer Olympics. At the 1952 Olympics, he won a bronze medal in the 1,000 metres time trial and a silver in the 2,000 metres tandem.
