= Ion Ioniță (cyclist) =

Romanian cyclist

Personal information
- Born: 14 July 1928 Constanţa, Romania

Cycling career
- Sport: Cycling

Ion Ioniță (born 14 July 1928) is a Romanian former cyclist. He competed at the 1952 and 1960 Summer Olympics.
