= Rowing at the 1948 Summer Olympics =

Coordinates: 51.5551°N 0.8903°W

Rowing at the Games of the XIV Olympiad
- Venue: Henley Royal Regatta course
- Dates: 5–9 August 1948
- Competitors: 310 from 27 nations

Rowing at the 1948 Summer Olympics featured seven events, for men only. Competitions were held over the Henley Royal Regatta course from 5 to 9 August.

== Medal summary ==
Games	Gold	Silver	Bronze
single sculls	Mervyn Wood; Australia	Eduardo Risso; Uruguay	Romolo Catasta; Italy
double sculls	Richard Burnell and Bert Bushnell; Great Britain	Ebbe Parsner and Aage Larsen; Denmark	William Jones and Juan Rodríguez; Uruguay
coxless pairs	John Wilson and Ran Laurie; Great Britain	Hans Kalt and Josef Kalt; Switzerland	Felice Fanetti and Bruno Boni; Italy
coxed pair	Denmark; Finn Pedersen; Tage Henriksen; Carl-Ebbe Andersen	Italy; Giovanni Steffè; Aldo Tarlao; Alberto Radi	Hungary; Antal Szendey; Béla Zsitnik; Róbert Zimonyi
coxless fours	Italy; Giuseppe Moioli; Elio Morille; Giovanni Invernizzi; Franco Faggi	Denmark; Helge Halkjær; Aksel Bonde; Helge Muxoll Schrøder; Ib Storm Larsen	United States; Fred Kingsbury; Stu Griffing; Greg Gates; Robert Perew
coxed four	United States; Warren Westlund; Bob Martin; Bob Will; Gordy Giovanelli; Allen Morgan	Switzerland; Rudolf Reichling; Erich Schriever; Émile Knecht; Peter Stebler; André Moccand	Denmark; Erik Larsen; Børge Raahauge Nielsen; Henry Larsen; Harry Knudsen; Ib Olsen
eights	United States; Ian Turner; David Turner; James Hardy; George Ahlgren; Lloyd Butler; David Brown; Justus Smith; John Stack; Ralph Purchase	Great Britain; Christopher Barton; Michael Lapage; Guy Richardson; Paul Bircher; Paul Massey; Brian Lloyd; David Meyrick; Alfred Mellows; Jack Dearlove	Norway; Kristoffer Lepsøe; Thorstein Kråkenes; Hans Hansen; Halfdan Gran Olsen; Harald Kråkenes; Leif Næss; Thor Pedersen; Carl Monssen; Sigurd Monssen

== Participating nations ==
A total of 310 rowers from 27 nations competed at the London Games:

- Argentina (26)
- Australia (8)
- Austria (7)
- Belgium (4)
- Brazil (2)
- Canada (11)
- Cuba (5)
- Czechoslovakia (4)
- Denmark (25)
- Egypt (1)
- Spain (1)
- Finland (5)
- France (22)
- Great Britain (26)
- Greece (8)
- Hungary (9)
- Ireland (9)
- Italy (26)
- Netherlands (6)
- Norway (14)
- Portugal (14)
- South Africa (5)
- Sweden (3)
- Switzerland (19)
- United States (26)
- Uruguay (3)
- Yugoslavia (21)

== Medal table ==
Rank	Nation	Gold	Silver	Bronze	Total
1	Great Britain	2	1	0	3
2	United States	2	0	1	3
3	Denmark	1	2	1	4
4	Italy	1	1	2	4
5	Australia	1	0	0	1
6	Switzerland	0	2	0	2
7	Uruguay	0	1	1	2
8	Hungary	0	0	1	1
8	Norway	0	0	1	1
Totals (9 entries)		7	7	7	21
