= Denmark at the 1948 Summer Olympics =

- IOC code: DEN
- NOC: Danish Olympic Committee

in London
- Competitors: 162 in 17 sports
- Flag bearer: Vagn Loft
- Medals Ranked 10th: Gold 5 Silver 7 Bronze 8 Total 20

Summer Olympics appearances (overview)
- 1896; 1900; 1904; 1908; 1912; 1920; 1924; 1928; 1932; 1936; 1948; 1952; 1956; 1960; 1964; 1968; 1972; 1976; 1980; 1984; 1988; 1992; 1996; 2000; 2004; 2008; 2012; 2016; 2020; 2024; 2028

Other related appearances
- 1906 Intercalated Games

Denmark competed at the 1948 Summer Olympics in London, England. 162 competitors, 144 men and 18 women, took part in 83 events in 17 sports.

== Medalists ==
Medal	Name	Sport	Event	Date
Gold	Greta Andersen	Swimming	Women's 100 m freestyle	2 August
Gold	Karen Harup	Swimming	Women's 100 m backstroke	5 August
Gold	Carl-Ebbe Andersen; Tage Henriksen; Finn Pedersen	Rowing	Men's coxed pair	9 August
Gold	Karen Hoff	Canoeing	Women's K-1 500 m	12 August
Gold	Paul Elvstrøm	Sailing	Men's Firefly	12 August
Silver	Karen Lachmann	Fencing	Women's foil individual	2 August
Silver	Greta Andersen; Fritze Carstensen; Karen Harup; Eva Riise	Swimming	Women's 4 × 100 m freestyle relay	6 August
Silver	Karen Harup	Swimming	Women's 400 m freestyle	7 August
Silver	Aage Larsen; Ebbe Parsner	Rowing	Men's doubles sculls	9 August
Silver	Ib Storm Larsen; Helge Schrøder; Helge Halkjær; Aksel Hansen	Rowing	Men's coxless fours	9 August
Silver	Johan Andersen	Canoeing	Men's K-1 1000 m	12 August
Silver	Ejvind Hansen; Bernhard Jensen	Canoeing	Men's K-2 1000 m	12 August
Bronze	Lily Carlstedt	Athletics	Women's javelin throw	31 July
Bronze	Henrik Hansen	Wrestling	Men's Greco-Roman welterweight	6 August
Bronze	Birte Christoffersen	Diving	Women's 10 m platform	6 August
Bronze	Axel Schandorff	Cycling	Men's Sprint	9 August
Bronze	Børge Nielsen; Jørgen Olsen; Harry Knudsen; Erik Larsen; Henry Larsen	Rowing	Men's coxed four	9 August
Bronze	Klaus Baess; Ole Berntsen; William Berntsen	Sailing	Men's Dragon	12 August
Bronze	Svend Wad	Boxing	Men's Lightweight	13 August
Bronze	Denmark national football team: Knud Bastrup-Birk; Hans Colberg; Edvin Hansen; John Hansen; Jørgen W. Hansen; Karl Aage Hansen; Erik Kuld Jensen; Ivan Jensen; Ove Jensen; Viggo Jensen; Per Knudsen; Knud Lundberg; Eigil Nielsen; Knud Børge Overgaard; Poul Petersen; Axel Pilmark; Johannes Pløger; Karl Aage Præst; Holger Seebach; Erling Sørensen; Jørgen Leschly Sørensen; Dion Ørnvold	Football	Men's competition	13 August

== Athletics ==
Men
Track & road events

Athlete	Event	Heat		Semifinal		Final	
Athlete	Event	Result	Rank	Result	Rank	Result	Rank
Herluf Christensen	800 metres	DNF		Did not advance			
Niels Holst-Sørensen	800 metres	1:54.2	1 Q	1:52.4	3 Q	1:54.0	9
Erik Jørgensen	1500 metres	3:54.2	2 Q	—N/a		3:56.1	9
Henning Larsen	Marathon	—N/a				2:41:22.0	10
Ingvard Nielsen	1500 metres	4:01.7	7	Did not advance			
Alf Olesen	3000 m steeplechase	9:33.6	5	Did not advance			
Aage Poulsen	5000 metres	DNF		—N/a		Did not advance	

Field events

Athlete	Event	Qualification		Final	
Athlete	Event	Distance	Position	Distance	Position
Poul Cederquist	Hammer throw	48.16	15	Did not advance	
Svend Aage Frederiksen	Hammer throw	51.35	4 Q	50.07	10
Preben Larsen	Triple jump	14.520	14 q	14.830	4

Women
Track & road events

Athlete	Event	Heat		Semifinal		Final	
Athlete	Event	Result	Rank	Result	Rank	Result	Rank
Bente Bergendorff	100 metres	12.6	2 Q	NT	4	Did not advance	
Birthe Nielsen	100 metres	12.9	2 Q	12.5	3	Did not advance	
Grethe Lovsø Nielsen	100 metres	12.6	1 Q	12.7	3	Did not advance	
Bente Bergendorff; Grethe Lovsø Nielsen; Birthe Nielsen; Hilde Nissen	4 × 100 m relay	48.1	2 Q	—N/a		48.2	5

Field events

Athlete	Event	Final	
Athlete	Event	Distance	Position
Lily Carlstedt-Kelsby	Javelin throw	42.08	Bronze medal
Anne Iversen	High jump	1.50	9

== Boxing ==
Men

Athlete	Event	1 Round	2 Round	Quarterfinals	Semifinals	Final	
Athlete	Event	Opposition Result	Opposition Result	Opposition Result	Opposition Result	Opposition Result	Rank
Erik Thastum	Bantamweight	Olavi Ouvinen (FIN); L PTS	Did not advance				
Svend Aage Sørensen	Featherweight	Pedro Garcia (PER); L PTS	Did not advance				
Svend Wad	Lightweight	Gene Raymond (IND); W PTS	Alberto Boullosa (URU); W PTS	Maxie McCullagh (IRL); W PTS	Gerald Dreyer (RSA); L PTS	Wallace Smith (USA); W WO	Bronze medal
Christian Kristensen	Welterweight	Max Shacklady (GBR); L KO-3	Did not advance				
Martin Hansen	Middleweight	Evert Johanson (NOR); W KO-1	Aimé-Joseph Escudie (FRA); L PTS	Did not advance			
Erik Jensen	Light Heavyweight	Chuck Spieser (USA); L PTS	Did not advance				

== Canoeing ==
=== Sprint ===
Men

Athlete	Event	Heats		Repechages		Semifinals		Final	
Athlete	Event	Time	Rank	Time	Rank	Time	Rank	Time	Rank
Johan Frederik Kobberup	K-1 1000 m	4:40.9	1 Q	—N/a				4:39.9	Silver medal
Knud Ditlevsen	K-1 10000 m	—N/a						51:54.2	4
Ejvind Hansen; Bernhard Jensen	K-2 1000 m	NT	1 Q	—N/a				4:07.5	Silver medal
Alfred Christensen; Finn Rasmussen	K-2 10000 m	—N/a						47:17.5	4

Women

Athlete	Event	Heats		Repechages		Semifinals		Final	
Athlete	Event	Time	Rank	Time	Rank	Time	Rank	Time	Rank
Karen Hoff	K-1 500 m	2:32.2	1 Q	—N/a				2:31.9	Gold medal

== Cycling ==
Eleven cyclists, all men, represented Denmark in 1948.

Road

Athlete	Event	Time	Rank
Knud Andersen	Men's road race	5:39:57.2	28
Børge Saxil Nielsen	Men's road race	DNF	
Kristian Pedersen	Men's road race	5:39:57.2	27
Rudolf Rasmussen	Men's road race	DNF	
Kristian Pedersen; Knud Andersen; Børge Saxil Nielsen; Rudolf Rasmussen	Team road race	DNF	

=== Track ===
1000m time trial

Athlete	Event	Time	Rank
Axel Schandorff	Men's 1000m time trial	1:15.5	5

Men's Sprint

Athlete	Event	Heats	Repechage 1	Round 2	Quarterfinals	Semifinals	Final	
Athlete	Event	Time Speed (km/h)	Rank	Opposition Time Speed (km/h)	Opposition Time Speed (km/h)	Opposition Time Speed (km/h)	Opposition Time Speed (km/h)	Rank
Axel Schandorff	Men's sprint	Bazzano (AUS); W 1:49.8	BYE	Welt (AUT); W 1:49.6	Heid (USA); W 2:0	Ghella (ITA); L 0-2	Bazzano (AUS); W 2-0	Bronze medal

Men's Tandem

Athlete	Event	Heats	Repechage	Quarterfinals	Semifinals	Final	
Athlete	Event	Opposition Time Speed (km/h)	Opposition Time Speed (km/h)	Opposition Time Speed (km/h)	Opposition Time Speed (km/h)	Opposition Time Speed (km/h)	Rank
Hans Andresen; Evan Klamer	Tandem	Van Schill; De Pauw (BEL); W 4:53.6	BYE	Faye; Dron (FRA); L 0-2	Did not advance		5

Pursuit

Athlete	Event	Round of 16	Quarterfinals	Semifinals	Final	
Athlete	Event	Time	Opposition Time	Opposition Time	Opposition Time	Rank
Max Jørgensen; Børge Gissel; Børge Mortensen; Benny Schnoor	Team pursuit	—N/a	Australia (AUS); W 5:04.1 Q	Great Britain (GBR); L 5:05.6	Did not advance	5

== Diving ==
Men

Athlete	Event	Final	
Athlete	Event	Points	Rank
Thomas Christiansen	3 m springboard	114.59	8
Thomas Christiansen	10m platform	105.22	6

Women

Athlete	Event	Final	
Athlete	Event	Points	Rank
Inge Beeken	10m platform	59.54	8
Birte Christoffersen	3 m springboard	87.12	9
Birte Christoffersen	10m platform	66.04	Bronze medal

== Equestrian ==
=== Eventing ===
Athlete	Horse	Event	Dressage		Cross-country			Jumping			Total	
Athlete	Horse	Event	Dressage		Cross-country			Final			Total	
Athlete	Horse	Event	Penalties	Rank	Penalties	Total	Rank	Penalties	Total	Rank	Penalties	Rank
Erik Carlsen	Esja	Individual	113.00	14	69	44	11	0	44	5	44	5
Kai Aage Krarup	Rollo	Individual	114.00	16	63	51	15	14	65	14	65	14
Niels Mikkelsen	St. Hans	Individual	108.00	8	78	30	5	DSQ			Did not finish	
Erik Carlsen; Kai Aage Krarup; Niels Mikkelsen	See above	Team	335	4	210	125	1	AC	AC	AC	Did not finish	

=== Show jumping ===
Athlete	Horse	Event	Final	
Athlete	Horse	Event	Penalties	Rank
Otto Mønsted Acthon	Please	Individual	DNF	
Jeppe Johannes Ladegaard-Mikkelsen	Atom	Individual	DNF	
Torben Tryde	Attila	Individual	DNF	
Otto Mønsted Acthon; Jeppe Johannes Ladegaard-Mikkelsen; Torben Tryde	See above	Team	DNF	

== Fencing ==
15 fencers, 12 men and 3 women, represented Denmark in 1948.

Men's foil

- Ivan Ruben
- Aage Leidersdorff
- Ole Albrechtsen

Men's team foil

- Ivan Ruben, Ole Albrechtsen, Aage Leidersdorff, Tage Jørgensen, Ivan Osiier, Flemming Vögg

Men's épée

- Mogens Lüchow
- Ib Nielsen

Men's team épée

- Mogens Lüchow, Erik Andersen, Ib Nielsen, René Dybkær, Jakob Lyng, Kenneth Flindt

Men's sabre

- Aage Leidersdorff
- Ivan Ruben
- Ivan Osiier

Women's foil

- Karen Lachmann
- Grete Olsen
- Kate Mahaut

== Field hockey ==
Group stage

The first of each group and also the second of Group C qualified for the Semi-finals.

Group C

Pos	Team	Pld	W	D	L	GF	GA	GD	Pts	Qualification
1	Pakistan	4	4	0	0	20	3	+17	8	Semi-finals
2	Netherlands	4	3	0	1	11	8	+3	6	Semi-finals
3	Belgium	4	2	0	2	6	8	−2	4	
4	France	4	0	1	3	4	9	−5	1	
5	Denmark	4	0	1	3	4	17	−13	1	

31 July 1948

Denmark	2–2	France

2 August 1948

Netherlands	4–1	Denmark

3 August 1948

Pakistan	9–0	Denmark

5 August 1948

Belgium	2–1	Denmark

== Football ==
First round

31 July 1948
18:30

Denmark	3–1 (aet)	Egypt
K. Hansen 82' 95'; Pløger 119' (pen.)	Report	El Guindy 83'

Selhurst Park, South Norwood
Attendance: 12,000
Referee: Stanley Boardman (Great Britain)

Quarter-final

5 August 1948
18:30

Denmark	5–3	Italy
John Hansen 30', 53', 74', 82'; Pløger 84'	Report	Cavigioli 49'; Caprile 67'; Pernigo 81'

Arsenal Stadium, Highbury
Attendance: 25,000
Referee: William Ling (Great Britain)

Semi-final

10 August 1948
18:30

Sweden	4–2	Denmark
Carlsson 18' 42'; Rosén 31' 37'	Report	Seebach 3'; John Hansen 77'

Empire Stadium, Wembley
Attendance: 20,000
Referee: Stanley Boardman (Great Britain)

Bronze medal match

13 August 1948
14:00

Great Britain	3–5	Denmark
Aitken 5'; Hardisty 33'; Amor 63' (pen.)	Report	Præst 12', 49'; John Hansen 16', 77'; J. Sørensen 41'

Empire Stadium, Wembley
Attendance: 50,000
Referee: Karel van der Meer (Netherlands)

== Rowing ==
Denmark had 25 male rowers participate in six out of seven rowing events in 1948.

Men

Athlete	Event	Heats		Repechage		Quarterfinal		Semifinal		Final	
Athlete	Event	Time	Rank	Time	Rank	Time	Rank	Time	Rank	Time	Rank
Aage Larsen; Ebbe Parsner	Double sculls	6:50.1	1 Q	BYE		—N/a		7:48.3	1 Q	6:55.3	Silver medal
Søren Jensen; Jørn Snogdahl	Coxless pair	7:28.3	3 R	7:26.4	1 Q	—N/a		7:54.3	2	Did not advance	4
Carl-Ebbe Andersen; Tage Henriksen; Finn Pedersen	Coxed pair	7:51.7	2 Q	7:51.2	1 Q	—N/a		8:12.7	1 Q	8:00.5	Gold medal
Aksel Bonde; Helge Halkjær; Helge Muxoll Schrøder; Ib Storm Larsen	Coxless four	6:40.5	2 R	6:35.1	1 Q	—N/a		7:13.8	1 Q	6:43.5	Silver medal
Erik Larsen; Henry Larsen; Ib Olsen; Børge Raahauge Nielsen; Harry Knudsen	Coxed four	6:52.5	1 Q	BYE		7:21.3	1 Q	7:31.3	1 Q	6:58.6	Bronze medal
Jarl Emcken; Børge Hougaard; Poul Korup; Holger Larsen; Ib Nielsen; Niels Rasmussen; Gerhardt Sørensen; Niels Wamberg; Charles Willumsen	Eights	6:17.6	3 R	6:09.4	2	Did not advance					8

== Sailing ==
Open

Athlete	Event	Race							Net points	Final rank
Athlete	Event	1	2	3	4	5	6	7	Net points	Final rank
Paul Elvstrøm	Firefly	~~DNF~~	6	3	11	5	1	1	5543	Gold medal
Johan Rathje; Naalli Petersen	Swallow	8	7	1	9	10	7	~~12~~	2935	5
William Berntsen; Klaus Baess; Ole Berntsen	Dragon	3	4	3	~~5~~	2	5	2	4223	Bronze medal
Troels la Cour; Bruno Clausen; Svend Iversen; René la Cour; Hans Sørensen; A. Eiermann; Eyvin Schiøttz	6 Metre	10	5	4	~~11~~	10	10	8	1648	10

== Shooting ==
Seven shooters represented Denmark in 1948.

Men

Athlete	Event	Final	
Athlete	Event	Score	Rank
Børge Christensen	Men's 50 metre rifle prone	585	42
Axel Lerche	Men's 25 metre pistol	540	31
Gregers Münter	Men's 25 metre pistol	498	51
Gustaf Nielsen	Men's 300 metre rifle three positions	1057	19
Gustaf Nielsen	Men's 50 metre rifle prone	595	11
Erik Sætter-Lassen	Men's 50 metre rifle prone	588	32
Uffe Schultz Larsen	Men's 300 metre rifle three positions	1047	21
Charles Villholth	Men's 25 metre pistol	523	41

== Swimming ==
Women

Athlete	Event	Heat		Semifinal		Final	
Athlete	Event	Time	Rank	Time	Rank	Time	Rank
Greta Andersen	100 metre freestroke	1:07.0	3 Q	1:05.9	1 Q	1:06.3	Gold medal
Greta Andersen	400 metre freestroke	DNF	19	Did not advance			
Fritze Carstensen	100 metre freestroke	1:06.5	1 Q	1:07.5	2 Q	1:09.1	8
Fritze Carstensen	400 metre freestroke	5:29.4	3 Q	5:29.5	5 Q	5:29.4	7
Jytte Hansen	200 metre breaststroke	3:09.1	2 Q	3:05.5	3 Q	3:08.1	8
Karen Margrethe Harup	100 metre freestroke	1:08.4	8 Q	1:08.7	8 q	1:08.1	4
Karen Margrethe Harup	400 metre freestroke	5:31.7	7 Q	5:25.7 OR	1 Q	5:21.2	Silver medal
Karen Margrethe Harup	100 metre backstroke	1:15.6	1 Q	1:15.5 OR	1 Q	1:14.4 OR	Gold medal
Eva Arndt-Riise; Karen Margrethe Harup; Greta Andersen; Fritze Carstensen; Elvi Svendsen	4 x 100 metre freestyle	4:33.5	1 Q	—N/a		4:29.6	Silver medal

== Weightlifting ==
Men

Athlete	Event	Military Press		Snatch		Clean & Jerk		Total	Rank
Athlete	Event	Result	Rank	Result	Rank	Result	Rank	Total	Rank
Johan Runge	60 kg	95	4	90	12	120	8	305	7
Jørgen Fryd Petersen	67.5 kg	90	14	97.5	10	127.5	9	315	10
Jørgen Moritzen	75 kg	87.5	22	95	17	DNS		DNF	
Niels Petersen	+82.5 kg	115	9	112.5	7	155	5	382.5	6

== Wrestling ==
Men's Greco-Roman

Athlete	Event	Elimination pool					Final round	
Athlete	Event	Round 1 Result	Round 2 Result	Round 3 Result	Round 4 Result	Round 5 Result	Final round Result	Rank
Svend Aage Thomsen	−52 kg	Pietro Lombardi (ITA); L 0–3	Kenan Olcay (TUR); L 0-3	Did not advance				11
Kolle Lejserowitz	−57 kg	Mahmoud Hassan (EGY); L 1-2	Reidar Merli (NOR); L 0–0 P	Did not advance				11
Abraham Kurland	−67 kg	Alfred Jauch (SUI); W RET	Charif Damage (LIB); L 0–3	Gustav Freij (SWE); L 2-1	Did not advance			9
Henrik Hansen	−73 kg	Kemal Munir (EGY); W F	Gösta Andersson (SWE); L 0–3	Bjørn Cook (NOR); W 3-0	Josef Schmidt (AUT); W F	Miklós Szilvási (HUN); L F	Did not advance	Bronze medal
Erling Stuer Lauridsen	−87 kg	Ibrahim Mahgoub (LIB); W 3-0	Peter Enzinger (AUT); W F	Karl-Erik Nilsson (SWE); L 0-3	Kelpo Gröndahl (FIN); L F	Did not advance		6

== Art competitions ==
Athlete	Event	Category	Title	Rank
Josef Petersen	Literature	Epic works	"The Olympic Champion"	Silver medal
Erling Brene	Music	Choral and orchestral	"Vigeur"	Bronze medal
Knud Nellemose	Sculpture	Statues	"Young Man with Discus", "Head of a Boxer"	NM
Knud Nellemose	Sculpture	Medals and plaques	"Group of Wrestlers", "Football Players"	NM
