= Rowing at the 1948 Summer Olympics – Men's eight =

Men's eight at the Games of the XIV Olympiad
- Rowing pictogram
- Venue: Henley-on-Thames
- Dates: 5–9 August 1948
- Competitors: 108 from 12 nations
- Winning time: 5:56.7

Medalists
1st place, gold medalist(s)		United States
2nd place, silver medalist(s)		Great Britain
3rd place, bronze medalist(s)		Norway

The men's eight competition at the 1948 Summer Olympics took place at Henley-on-Thames, near London. It was held from 5 to 9 August. There were 12 boats (108 competitors) from 12 nations, with each nation limited to a single boat in the event. The event was won by the United States, the nation's sixth consecutive and eighth overall gold medal in the men's eight; the Americans had won every time they competed (missing 1908 and 1912). Great Britain, the only other nation to have won in the event, finished second for its first medal in the event since 1928. Norway took bronze, its first medal in the men's eight since 1920.

== Background ==
This was the 10th appearance of the event. Rowing had been on the programme in 1896 but was cancelled due to bad weather. The men's eight has been held every time that rowing has been contested, beginning in 1900.

The United States was the dominant nation in the event, with the nation winning the previous five Olympic men's eight competitions (as well as the other two competitions which the United States had entered). The American squad this year came from the University of California, Berkeley. Their primary challenger was Great Britain, represented by the Thames Rowing Club, the 1948 Grand Challenge Cup winners. Italy, the two-time reigning silver medalists, had won the 1947 European Rowing Championships.

Ireland and Portugal each made their debut in the event. Canada, Great Britain, and the United States each made their eighth appearance, tied for most among nations to that point.

== Competition format ==
The "eight" event featured nine-person boats, with eight rowers and a coxswain. It was a sweep rowing event, with the rowers each having one oar (and thus each rowing on one side).

The venue, Henley-on-Thames, imposed certain restrictions and modifications to the format. The course could handle only three boats at a time (and this required expansion of the typical Henley course), so the six-boat final introduced in 1936 was not possible this time. The course distance was also modified; instead of either the 2000 metres distance that was standard for the Olympics or the 1 mile 550 yards (2112 metres) standard at Henley, a course that was somewhat shorter than either was used. Sources disagree on the exact distance: 1929 metres is listed by the Official Report, though other sources say 1850 metres.

The 1948 competition had four rounds: three main rounds (quarterfinals, semifinals, and a final) as well as a repechage after the quarterfinals.

- The 12 boats were divided into 4 heats of 3 boats each for the quarterfinals. The winner of each heat (4 total) advanced directly to the semifinals, while the 2nd and 3rd place boats (8 total) went to the repechage.
- The repechage had 8 boats. They were placed in 3 heats, with 2 or 3 boats each. The winner of each repechage heat (3 boats) rejoined the quarterfinal winners in the semifinals, with the other boats (5 total) eliminated.
- The semifinals placed the 7 boats in 3 heats, with 2 or 3 boats per heat. The winner of each heat (3 boats total) advanced to the final, while the other boats (4 total) were eliminated.
- The final round consisted of a single final for the medals.

== Schedule ==
All times are British Summer Time (UTC+1)

Date	Time	Round
Thursday, 5 August 1948		Quarterfinals
Friday, 6 August 1948		Repechage
Saturday, 7 August 1948	15:45	Semifinals
Monday, 9 August 1948	18:00	Final

== Results ==
=== Quarterfinals ===
The first boat in each heat advanced directly to the semifinals. The other boats competed again in the repechage for the remaining spots in the semifinals.

==== Quarterfinal 1 ====
Rank	Rowers	Coxswain	Nation	Time	Notes
1	Christopher Barton; Michael Lapage; Guy Richardson; Paul Bircher; Paul Massey; Brian Lloyd; John Meyrick; Alfred Mellows	Jack Dearlove	Great Britain	6:05.3	Q
2	Kristoffer Lepsøe; Thorstein Kråkenes; Hans Hansen; Halfdan Gran Olsen; Harald Kråkenes; Leif Næss; Thor Pedersen; Carl Monssen	Sigurd Monssen	Norway	6:08.2	R
3	Jarl Emcken; Børge Hougaard; Poul Korup; Holger Larsen; Ib Nielsen; Niels Rasmussen; Gerhardt Sørensen; Charles Willumsen	Niels Wamberg	Denmark	6:17.6	R

==== Quarterfinal 2 ====
Rank	Rowers	Coxswain	Nation	Time	Notes
1	Angelo Fioretti; Mario Acchini; Fortunato Maninetti; Bonifacio De Bortoli; Enrico Ruberti; Pietro Sessa; Ezio Acchini; Luigi Gandini	Alessandro Bardelli	Italy	6:03.8	Q
2	Otto Burri; Fredy Schultheiss; Franz Starkl; Hans Schultheiss; Arnold Amstutz; Moritz Grand; Peter Gübeli; Eugen Vollmar	Otto Vonlaufen	Switzerland	6:06.9	R
3	Luis Pechenino; Juan Ángel Aichino; Rubén Cabral; Christian Bove; Enrique Lingenfelder; Carlos Amado; Pascual Batista; Mario Guerci	Manuel Fernández	Argentina	6:10.5	R

==== Quarterfinal 3 ====
Rank	Rowers	Coxswain	Nation	Time	Notes
1	Peter Green; Robert Christmas; Art Griffiths; Alfred Stefani; Marvin Hammond; Jack Zwirewich; Bill McConnell; Ron Cameron	Walt Robertson	Canada	6:07.2	Q
2	Felisberto Fortes; Albino Simões Neto; Carlos Roque; João de Sousa; João Alberto Lemos; Carlos da Benta; José Machado; Ricardo da Benta	Luís Machado	Portugal	6:10.5	R
3	Paddy Dooley; Robin Tamplin; Paddy Harold; Barry McDonnell; Danny Taylor; Joe Hanly; Morgan McElligott; Tom Dowdall	Denis Sugrue	Ireland	6:30.6	R

==== Quarterfinal 4 ====
Rank	Rowers	Coxswain	Nation	Time	Notes
1	Ian Turner; David Turner; James Hardy; George Ahlgren; Lloyd Butler; David Brown; Justus Smith; John Stack	Ralph Purchase	United States	5:59.1	Q
2	Mile Petrović; Sreta Novičić; Sveto Drenovac; Branko Becić; Ivan Telesmanić; Karlo Pavlenć; Slobodan Jovanović; Bogdan Sirotanović	Predrag Sarić	Yugoslavia	6:16.2	R
3	Pierre Fauveau; Pierre Sauvestre; Alphonse Bouton; Erik Aschehoug; Jean Bocahut; René Boucher; Pierre Clergerie; Roger Lebranchu	Robert Léon	France	6:18.1	R

=== Repechage ===
The winner of each race advanced to the semifinals, while the other boats were eliminated.

==== Repechage heat 1 ====
Rank	Rowers	Coxswain	Nation	Time	Notes
1	Felisberto Fortes; Albino Simões Neto; Carlos Roque; João de Sousa; João Alberto Lemos; Carlos da Benta; José Machado; Ricardo da Benta	Luís Machado	Portugal	6:11.3	Q
2	Luis Pechenino; Juan Ángel Aichino; Rubén Cabral; Christian Bove; Enrique Lingenfelder; Carlos Amado; Pascual Batista; Mario Guerci	Manuel Fernández	Argentina	6:12.6	
3	Mile Petrović; Sreta Novičić; Sveto Drenovac; Branko Becić; Ivan Telesmanić; Karlo Pavlenć; Slobodan Jovanović; Bogdan Sirotanović	Predrag Sarić	Yugoslavia	6:19.1	

==== Repechage heat 2 ====
Rank	Rowers	Coxswain	Nation	Time	Notes
1	Otto Burri; Fredy Schultheiss; Franz Starkl; Hans Schultheiss; Arnold Amstutz; Moritz Grand; Peter Gübeli; Eugen Vollmar	Otto Vonlaufen	Switzerland	6:07.3	Q
2	Jarl Emcken; Børge Hougaard; Poul Korup; Holger Larsen; Ib Nielsen; Niels Rasmussen; Gerhardt Sørensen; Charles Willumsen	Niels Wamberg	Denmark	6:09.4	
—	Pierre Fauveau; Pierre Sauvestre; Alphonse Bouton; Erik Aschehoug; Jean Bocahut; René Boucher; Pierre Clergerie; Roger Lebranchu	Robert Léon	France	DNS	

==== Repechage heat 3 ====
Rank	Rowers	Coxswain	Nation	Time	Notes
1	Kristoffer Lepsøe; Thorstein Kråkenes; Hans Hansen; Halfdan Gran Olsen; Harald Kråkenes; Leif Næss; Thor Pedersen; Carl Monssen	Sigurd Monssen	Norway	6:12.5	Q
2	Paddy Dooley; Robin Tamplin; Paddy Harold; Barry McDonnell; Danny Taylor; Joe Hanly; Morgan McElligott; Tom Dowdall	Denis Sugrue	Ireland	6:32.5	

=== Semifinals ===
The winner of each race advanced to the final, while the other boats were eliminated.

==== Semifinal 1 ====
Rank	Rowers	Coxswain	Nation	Time	Notes
1	Ian Turner; David Turner; James Hardy; George Ahlgren; Lloyd Butler; David Brown; Justus Smith; John Stack	Ralph Purchase	United States	6:36.5	Q
2	Angelo Fioretti; Mario Acchini; Fortunato Maninetti; Bonifacio De Bortoli; Enrico Ruberti; Pietro Sessa; Ezio Acchini; Luigi Gandini	Alessandro Bardelli	Italy	6:52.1	
3	Otto Burri; Fredy Schultheiss; Franz Starkl; Hans Schultheiss; Arnold Amstutz; Moritz Grand; Peter Gübeli; Eugen Vollmar	Otto Vonlaufen	Switzerland	7:03.0	

==== Semifinal 2 ====
Rank	Rowers	Coxswain	Nation	Time	Notes
1	Christopher Barton; Michael Lapage; Guy Richardson; Paul Bircher; Paul Massey; Brian Lloyd; John Meyrick; Alfred Mellows	Jack Dearlove	Great Britain	6:38.1	Q
2	Peter Green; Robert Christmas; Art Griffiths; Alfred Stefani; Marvin Hammond; Jack Zwirewich; Bill McConnell; Ron Cameron	Walt Robertson (cox)	Canada	6:44.1	

==== Semifinal 3 ====
Rank	Rowers	Coxswain	Nation	Time	Notes
1	Kristoffer Lepsøe; Thorstein Kråkenes; Hans Hansen; Halfdan Gran Olsen; Harald Kråkenes; Leif Næss; Thor Pedersen; Carl Monssen	Sigurd Monssen	Norway	6:43.9	Q
2	Felisberto Fortes; Albino Simões Neto; Carlos Roque; João de Sousa; João Alberto Lemos; Carlos da Benta; José Machado; Ricardo da Benta	Luís Machado	Portugal	6:49.9	

=== Final ===
Rank	Rowers	Coxswain	Nation	Time
1st place, gold medalist(s)	Ian Turner; David Turner; James Hardy; George Ahlgren; Lloyd Butler; David Brown; Justus Smith; John Stack	Ralph Purchase	United States	5:56.7
2nd place, silver medalist(s)	Christopher Barton; Michael Lapage; Guy Richardson; Paul Bircher; Paul Massey; Brian Lloyd; John Meyrick; Alfred Mellows	Jack Dearlove	Great Britain	6:06.9
3rd place, bronze medalist(s)	Kristoffer Lepsøe; Thorstein Kråkenes; Hans Hansen; Halfdan Gran Olsen; Harald Kråkenes; Leif Næss; Thor Pedersen; Carl Monssen	Sigurd Monssen	Norway	6:10.3
