= Portugal at the 1948 Summer Olympics =

- IOC code: POR
- NOC: Olympic Committee of Portugal

in London
- Competitors: 48 in 8 sports
- Officials: 3
- Medals Ranked 26th: Gold 0 Silver 1 Bronze 1 Total 2

Summer Olympics appearances (overview)
- 1912; 1920; 1924; 1928; 1932; 1936; 1948; 1952; 1956; 1960; 1964; 1968; 1972; 1976; 1980; 1984; 1988; 1992; 1996; 2000; 2004; 2008; 2012; 2016; 2020; 2024; 2028

Portugal competed at the 1948 Summer Olympics in London, England. A delegation of forty eight competitors participated in eight sports, with an equestrian and sailing teams winning both a bronze and Portugal's first Olympic silver medal, respectively. This was also the first Olympics where this nation won more than one medal.

== Medalists ==
=== Silver ===
- Duarte de Almeida Bello and Fernando Pinto Coelho Bello — Sailing, Swallow (Golondrina).

=== Bronze ===
- Fernando Paes, Francisco Valadas, Jr. and Luís Mena e Silva — Equestrian, Team Dressage.

== Athletics ==
Men's 100m:

- J. Rodrigues de Morais — 1st round: 3rd (heat 11)

Men's 200m:

- J. Rodrigues de Morais — 1st round: 3rd (heat 3)

Men's Long Jump:

- A. Pereira Dias Cachulo — qualifiers

Men's Triple Jump:

- Luís Alcide de Nunes Garcia — qualifiers
- João Rodrigues Vieira — qualifiers

== Equestrian ==
Men's Individual Dressage:

- Fernando Paes — 9th (411 points)
- Francisco Valadas, Jr. — 10th (405 points)
- Luís Mena e Silva — 12th (366 points)

Men's Team Dressage:

- Fernando Paes, Francisco Valadas, Jr. and Luís Mena e Silva — 3rd (1182 points)

Men's Individual Eventing:

- António Serôdio — eliminated
- Fernando Paes — 25th (167½ points)
- Fernando Marques Cavaleiro — 8th (55 points)

Men's Individual Jumping:

- Henrique Alves Calado — 18th (26 points)
- Hélder de Souza — eliminated
- João Correia Barrento — 22nd (42½ points)

Men's Team Jumping:

- Henrique Alves Calado, Hélder de Souza and João Correia Barrento — eliminated

== Fencing ==
Six fencers, all men, represented Portugal in 1948.

Men's épée

- Álvaro Pinto — 1st round: 5th (poule 1)
- Emílio Lino — 1st round: 5th (poule 8)
- Manuel Chagas — 1st round: 7th (poule 2)

Men's team épée

- Álvaro Pinto, Carlos Dias, Emílio Lino, José Castro, Manuel Chagas and João Costa — 1st round: 3rd (poule 6)

== Rowing ==
Portugal had 14 male rowers participate in two out of seven rowing events in 1948.

Men's coxed four — 2nd round
2nd (heat 4)

- António Torres
- Delfim José da Silva
- José Joaquim Cancela
- José do Seixo
- Leonel Rêgo (cox)

Men's eight — semi-final
2nd (heat 3)

- Felisberto Fortes
- Albino Simões Neto
- Carlos Roque
- João de Sousa
- João Alberto Lemos
- Carlos da Benta
- José Machado
- Ricardo da Benta
- Luís Machado (cox)

== Sailing ==
Open

Athlete	Event	Race							Net points	Final rank
Athlete	Event	1	2	3	4	5	6	7	Net points	Final rank
Joao Miguez Tito	Firefly	~~15~~	10	10	7	8	14	11	2603	13
Joaquim Mascarenhas de Fiúza; Júlio de Sousa Leite Gorinho	Star	11	6	1	5	~~12~~	5	3	4292	6
Duarte de Almeida Bello; Fernando Pinto Coelho Bello	Swallow	1	4	4	~~5~~	1	5	1	5579	Silver medal
Joao Félix da Silva Capucho; António Guedes de Herédia; Carlos Rogenmoser Lourenço; Henrique Reis Goncho Sallaty	Dragon	~~11~~	9	6	8	7	6	5	2123	9

== Shooting ==
Five shooters represented Portugal in 1948.

25 metre pistol

- Carlos Queiroz — 54th (489 points)
- José Maria Ferreira — 22nd (524 points)
- Moysés Cardoso — 55th (465 points)

50 metre pistol

- Moysés Cardoso — 42nd (485 points)
- Carlos Queiroz — 46th (482 points)

50 metre rifle

- Abílio Brandão — 57th (576 points)
- Carlos Queiroz — 63rd (572 points)
- José da Silva — 66th (570 points)

== Swimming ==
Men

Rank given is within the heat.

Athlete	Event	Heat		Semifinal		Final	
Athlete	Event	Time	Rank	Time	Rank	Time	Rank
Mário Simas	100 m backstroke	1:12.8	5	Did not advance			

== Officials ==
- César de Melo (chief of mission)
- Frederico Paredes (fencing)
- J. de A. Machado (fencing)
- F. Duarte (rowing)
