= Switzerland at the 1948 Summer Olympics =

- IOC code: SUI
- NOC: Swiss Olympic Association

in London, Great Britain 29 July 1948 – 14 August 1948
- Competitors: 186 (178 men and 8 women) in 19 sports
- Flag bearer: Armin Scheurer
- Medals Ranked 9th: Gold 5 Silver 10 Bronze 5 Total 20

Summer Olympics appearances (overview)
- 1896; 1900; ~~1904~~; 1908; 1912; 1920; 1924; 1928; 1932; 1936; 1948; 1952; 1956; 1960; 1964; 1968; 1972; 1976; 1980; 1984; 1988; 1992; 1996; 2000; 2004; 2008; 2012; 2016; 2020; 2024; 2028

Other related appearances
- 1906 Intercalated Games

Switzerland competed at the 1948 Summer Olympics in London, England. 186 competitors, 178 men and 8 women, took part in 98 events in 19 sports.

== Medalists ==
Medal	Name	Sport	Event	Date
Gold	Emil Grünig	Shooting	Men's 300 metre free rifle, three positions	6 August
Gold	Hans Moser	Equestrian	Individual dressage	10 August
Gold	Josef Stalder	Gymnastics	Men's horizontal bar	13 August
Gold	Michael Reusch	Gymnastics	Men's parallel bars	13 August
Gold	Karl Frei	Gymnastics	Men's rings	13 August
Silver	Gaston Godel	Athletics	Men's 50 kilometres walk	31 July
Silver	Fritz Stöckli	Wrestling	Men's freestyle light heavyweight	31 July
Silver	Rudolf Schnyder	Shooting	Men's 50 metre pistol	2 August
Silver	Oswald Zappelli	Fencing	Men's épée	9 August
Silver	Hans Kalt; Josef Kalt	Rowing	Men's coxless pair	9 August
Silver	Émile Knecht; André Moccand; Rudolf Reichling; Erich Schriever; Peter Stebler	Rowing	Men's coxed four	9 August
Silver	Walter Lehmann	Gymnastics	Men's artistic individual all-around	13 August
Silver	Karl Frei; Christian Kipfer; Walter Lehmann; Robert Lucy; Michael Reusch; Josef Stalder; Emil Studer; Melchior Thalmann	Gymnastics	Men's artistic team all-around	13 August
Silver	Walter Lehmann	Gymnastics	Men's horizontal bar	13 August
Silver	Michael Reusch	Gymnastics	Men's rings	13 August
Bronze	Adolf Müller	Wrestling	Men's freestyle featherweight	31 July
Bronze	Hermann Baumann	Wrestling	Men's freestyle lightweight	31 July
Bronze	Fritz Schwab	Athletics	Men's 10 kilometres walk	7 August
Bronze	Christian Kipfer	Gymnastics	Men's parallel bars	13 August
Bronze	Josef Stalder	Gymnastics	Men's parallel bars	13 August

== Cycling ==
Eleven cyclists, all male, represented Switzerland in 1948.

Individual road race

- Jakob Schenk
- Jean Brun
- Walter Reiser
- Giovanni Rossi

Team road race

- Jakob Schenk
- Jean Brun
- Walter Reiser
- Giovanni Rossi

Sprint

- Jean Roth

Time trial

- Hans Flückiger

Tandem

- Jean Roth
- Max Aeberli

Team pursuit

- Walter Bucher
- Gaston Gerosa
- Eugen Kamber
- Hans Pfenninger

== Diving ==
Men

Athlete	Event	Final	
Athlete	Event	Points	Rank
Ernst Strupler	3 m springboard	80.09	25
Willy Rist	10 m platform	81.78	23
Ernst Strupler	10 m platform	77.67	25

== Fencing ==
19 fencers, 16 men and 3 women, represented Switzerland in 1948.

Men's foil

- Corrado Schlaepfer
- Walo Hörning
- Jean Rubli

Men's team foil

- Gottfried von Meiss, Roger Stirn, Walo Hörning, Corrado Schlaepfer, Jean Rubli

Men's épée

- Oswald Zappelli
- Robert Lips
- Rodolphe Spillmann

Men's team épée

- Fernand Thiébaud, Robert Lips, Jean Hauert, Oswald Zappelli, Otto Rüfenacht, Marc Chamay

Men's sabre

- Walter Widemann
- Otto Greter
- Alphonse Ruckstuhl

Men's team sabre

- Roland Turian, Alphonse Ruckstuhl, Otto Greter, Walter Widemann

Women's foil

- Anna Klüpfel
- Hedwig Rieder
- Victoria Hagemann

== Modern pentathlon ==
Three male pentathletes represented Switzerland in 1948.

- Bruno Riem
- Franz Hegner
- Werner Schmid

== Rowing ==
Switzerland had 19 male rowers participate in five out of seven rowing events in 1948.

Men's single sculls

- Hansjakob Keller

Men's double sculls

- Maurice Gueissaz
- Maurice Matthey

Men's coxless pair

- Hans Kalt
- Josef Kalt

Men's coxed four

- Rudolf Reichling
- Erich Schriever
- Émile Knecht
- Peter Stebler
- André Moccand (cox)

Men's eight

- Otto Burri
- Fredy Schultheiss
- Franz Starkl
- Hans Schultheiss
- Arnold Amstutz
- Moritz Grand
- Peter Gübeli
- Eugen Vollmar
- Otto Vonlaufen (cox)

== Shooting ==
Seven shooters represented Switzerland in 1948. Emil Grünig won gold in the 300 metre rifle and Rudolf Schnyder won silver in the 50 metre pistol.

25 metre pistol

- Rudolf Schnyder
- Walter Lienhard

50 metre pistol

- Rudolf Schnyder
- Beat Rhyner
- Heinz Ambühl

300 metre rifle

- Emil Grünig
- Otto Horber
- Mario Ciocco

50 metre rifle

- Otto Horber
- Emil Grünig
- Mario Ciocco

== Swimming ==
Men

Athlete	Event	Heat		Semifinal		Final	
Athlete	Event	Time	Rank	Time	Rank	Time	Rank
Walter Schneider	100 m freestyle	1:05.1	8*	Did not advance			
Walter Schneider	400 m freestyle	5:25.5	35	Did not advance			
Hans Blumer	100 m backstroke	1:18.5	6*	Did not advance			
Walter Kunz	200 m breaststroke	2:57.6	23	Did not advance			
Hans Widmer	200 m breaststroke	2:56.7	21	Did not advance			
Nicolas Wildhaber	200 m breaststroke	2:59.2	24	Did not advance			

*Ranks given are within the heat.

Women

Athlete	Event	Heat		Semifinal		Final	
Athlete	Event	Time	Rank	Time	Rank	Time	Rank
Marianne Erismann	100 m freestyle	1:19.9	34	Did not advance			
Doris Gontersweiler-Vetterli	100 m backstroke	1:26.2	22	Did not advance			
Liselotte Kobi	200 m breaststroke	3:16.2	6 q*	3:13.9	7*	Did not advance	

*Ranks given are within the heat.
