= Yugoslavia at the 1948 Summer Olympics =

- Flag of FPR Yugoslavia
- IOC code: YUG
- NOC: Yugoslav Olympic Committee

in London
- Competitors: 90 (79 men, 11 women) in 8 sports
- Flag bearer: Božo Grkinić
- Medals Ranked 24th: Gold 0 Silver 2 Bronze 0 Total 2

Summer Olympics appearances (overview)
- 1920; 1924; 1928; 1932; 1936; 1948; 1952; 1956; 1960; 1964; 1968; 1972; 1976; 1980; 1984; 1988; 1992; 1996; 2000

Other related appearances
- Serbia (1912, 2008–pres.); Croatia (1992–pres.); Slovenia (1992–pres.); Bosnia and Herzegovina (1992 S–pres.); Independent Olympic Participants (1992 S); North Macedonia (1996–pres.); Serbia and Montenegro (1996–2006); Montenegro (2008–pres.); Kosovo (2016–pres.)

Athletes from the Federal People's Republic of Yugoslavia competed at the 1948 Summer Olympics in London, England. Ninety competitors—79 men and 11 women—took part in 35 events in 8 sports.

== Medalists ==
Medal	Name	Sport	Event
Silver	Ivan Gubijan	Athletics	Men's Hammer Throw
Silver	Franjo Šoštarić; Miroslav Brozović; Branko Stanković; Zlatko Čajkovski; Aleksandar Atanacković; Prvoslav Mihajlović; Rajko Mitić; Franjo Wölfl; Stjepan Bobek; Željko Čajkovski; Ljubomir Lovrić; Zvonimir Cimermančić; Bernard Vukas; Ivan Jazbinšek; Ratko Kacian; Frane Matošić; Béla Pálfi; Miodrag Jovanović; Kosta Tomašević; Josip Takač; Božo Broketa; Aleksandar Petrović	Football	Men's Team Competition

== Athletics ==
Men's 400 metres

- Marko Račič
- Zvonko Sabolović

Men's 3000 metres steeplechase

- Petar Šegedin
- Đorđe Stefanović

Men's 4 × 400 metres relay

- Jerko Bulić
- Aleksandar Ćosić
- Marko Račič
- Zvonko Sabolović

Men's discus throw

- Danilo Žerjal

Men's javelin throw

- Dušan Vujačić
- Mirko Vujačić

Men's hammer throw

- Ivan Gubijan

Men's decathlon

- Davorin Marčelja
- Oto Rebula

Women's 100 metres

- Alma Butia

Women's 200 metres

- Alma Butia

Women's shot put

- Marija Radosavljević

Women's discus throw

- Julija Matej

== Cycling ==
Four male cyclists represented Yugoslavia in 1948.

Individual road race

- Milan Poredski
- August Prosenik
- Aleksandar Strain
- Aleksandar Zorić

Team road race

- Milan Poredski
- August Prosenik
- Aleksandar Strain
- Aleksandar Zorić

== Gymnastics ==
Men's team all around - 10th

- Konrad Grilec, Josip Kujundžić, Miro Longyka, Drago Jelić, Ivica Jelić, Jakob Šubelj, Stjepan Boltižar, Karel Janež

Women's team all-around - 7th

- Vida Gerbec, Dragana Đorđević, Ruža Vojsk, Draginja Đipalović, Tanja Žutić, Dragica Basletić, Zlatica Mijatović, Neža Černe

== Rowing ==
Yugoslavia had 21 male rowers participate in five out of seven rowing events in 1948.

Men's single sculls

- Dragutin Petrovečki

Men's coxed pair

- Vladeta Ristić
- Marko Horvatin
- Duško Đorđević (cox; semi-final)
- Predrag Sarić (cox; round one)

Men's coxless four

- Petar Ozretić
- Ivo Lipanović
- Mate Mojtić
- Klement Alujević

Men's coxed four

- Šime Bujas
- Stipe Krnčević
- Jakov Labura
- Daniel Krnćević
- Duško Đorđević (cox)

Men's eight

- Mile Petrović
- Sreta Novičić
- Sveto Drenovac
- Branko Becić
- Ivan Telesmanić
- Karlo Pavlenć
- Slobodan Jovanović
- Bogdan Sirotanović
- Predrag Sarić (cox)

== Swimming ==
Men

Athlete	Event	Heat		Semifinal		Final	
Athlete	Event	Time	Rank	Time	Rank	Time	Rank
Janko Puhar	400 m freestyle	5:00.8	14 q	4:58.7	11	Did not advance	
Marijan Stipetić	400 m freestyle	5:01.4	15 q	4:58.6	10	Did not advance	
Branko Vidović	400 m freestyle	4:58.7	13 q	4:59.4	13	Did not advance	
Vanja Ilić	1500 m freestyle	21:17.0	18	Did not advance			
Janko Puhar	1500 m freestyle	21:45.1	34	Did not advance			
Marijan Stipetić	1500 m freestyle	20:10.1	3 Q	20:12.9	6 Q	20:10.7	5
Tone Cerer	200 m breaststroke	2:46.3	5 Q	2:47.3	8 q	2:46.1	5
Vanja Ilić; Ciril Pelhan; Janko Puhar; Branko Vidović	4 × 200 metre freestyle relay	9:12.4	2 Q*	—N/a		9:14.0	5

*Rank given is within the heat.
