= Børge Hougaard =

Danish rower (1921–2012)

Personal information
- Born: 11 June 1921 Nykøbing Falster
- Died: 4 May 2012 (aged 90)

Sport
- Sport: Rowing
Medal record
Men's rowing
Representing Denmark
European Rowing Championships
Silver medal – second place	1947 Lucerne	Eight
Silver medal – second place	1950 Milan	Coxless four
Silver medal – second place	1953 Copenhagen	Eight
Silver medal – second place	1954 Amsterdam	Eight

Børge Hougaard Petersen (11 June 1921 – 4 May 2012) was a Danish rower who competed at the 1948 Summer Olympics in London. He participated in the Men's eight alongside Charles Willumsen, Ib Nielsen, Niels Rasmussen, Gerhardt Sørensen, Jarl Emcken, Poul Korup, Holger Larsen, and Niels Wamberg, but the team was eliminated in the opening round. He was born in Nykøbing Falster and competed for Roklubben Skjold, with whom he won the eights event at the Danish national rowing championships for three consecutive years from 1947 through 1949, and again in 1953.
