= UCD Boat Club =

Irish rowing club

- Motto: Ad Astra
- Location: Islandbridge, Dublin (Republic of Ireland)
- Coordinates: 53.346568°N 6.317911°W
- Home water: River Liffey
- Founded: 1917
- University: University College Dublin
- Affiliations: Rowing Ireland
- Website: ucdbc.ie

Notable members
- Barry McDonnell; Claire Lambe; Denis Sugrue; Eimear Lambe; Jaye Renehan; Joe Hanly; Martin Feeley; Morgan McElligott; Paddy Dooley; Paul O'Donovan; Tom Dowdall

UCD Boat Club
Medal record

Rowing

Olympic Games

Representing Ireland
| Silver medal – second place | 2016 Rio | LM2X Paul O'Donovan |

World Championships

Representing Ireland
| Gold medal – first place | 2016 Rotterdam | LM1X Paul O'Donovan |
| Bronze medal – third place | 2019 Linz | PR2 W1X Katie O'Brien |

World U23 Championships

Representing Ireland
| Gold medal – first place | 2018 Poznan | LM2- David O'Malley |
| Gold medal – first place | 2018 Poznan | LM2- Shane Mulvaney |
| Silver medal – second place | 2018 Poznan | LM4X Andrew Goff |
| Silver medal – second place | 2019 Sarasota | W4- Eimear Lambe |
| Bronze medal – third place | 2013 Linz | M1X Paul O'Donovan |
| Bronze medal – third place | 2017 Plovdiv | LM2- Shane Mulvaney |
| Bronze medal – third place | 2017 Plovdiv | LM2- David O'Malley |
| Bronze medal – third place | 2017 Plovdiv | LM4X Shane O'Connell |
| Bronze medal – third place | 2017 Plovdiv | LM4X Andrew Goff |

European Championships

Representing Ireland
| Gold medal – first place | 2016 Brandenburg | LM2X Paul O'Donovan |
| Silver medal – second place | 2017 Racice | LM2X Paul O'Donovan |

UCD Boat Club or University College Dublin Boat Club, founded in 1917, is the rowing club of University College Dublin. It is based in Islandbridge in Dublin, along the River Liffey, and also trains on Blessington Lake.

== History ==
=== Founding ===
The club was founded as University College Dublin Rowing Club in 1917 and boated initially from Commercial Rowing Club and later from Dolphin Rowing Club in Ringsend. It was renamed University College Dublin Boat Club in 1926 and moved to Dublin Rowing Club in Islandbridge in 1928.

=== First Success ===
The club moved to its own boathouse in 1932 and soon won its first Wylie Cup in 1938, followed by its first Irish Championships for the Men's Senior 8+ in 1939 and 1940. Its first appearance at Henley Royal Regatta came in 1947, reaching the semi-final of the Thames Challenge Cup. This year also saw the first presentation of the Gannon Cup for competition between the club and Dublin University Boat Club, named in memory of Ciaran Gannon who captained UCD in 1937 and 1938, and died on active service with the RAMC in Burma in 1944.

Five UCD rowers along with a UCD cox, coach and manager formed part of the Irish Men's 8+ at the 1948 Olympic Games.

=== Growth ===
The club developed strongly in the 1960s winning the Irish Men's Senior 8+ three times while its alumni club, Old Collegians, won a further two. This progress continued in the early 1970s when a crew nicknamed "The Animals" won three-in-a-row Irish Men's Senior 8+ titles before triumphing in the Ladies' Challenge Plate at Henley in 1974, the first Irish crew to win the event since 1875.

Two members of the crew went on to represent Ireland in the Men's Coxless Four at the 1976 Olympic Games.

This era of growth was capped by the foundation of UCD Ladies Boat Club in 1975 and moving to the current boathouse in 1977.

=== Recent Years ===
Both clubs have continued to compete with success, as UCD Boat Club, at the Irish Championships and Henley Royal Regatta, winning the Prince Albert Challenge Cup in 2010, while members have represented Ireland at multiple World Rowing events, including Paul O'Donovan and Claire Lambe at the 2016 Olympic Games.

== Facilities ==
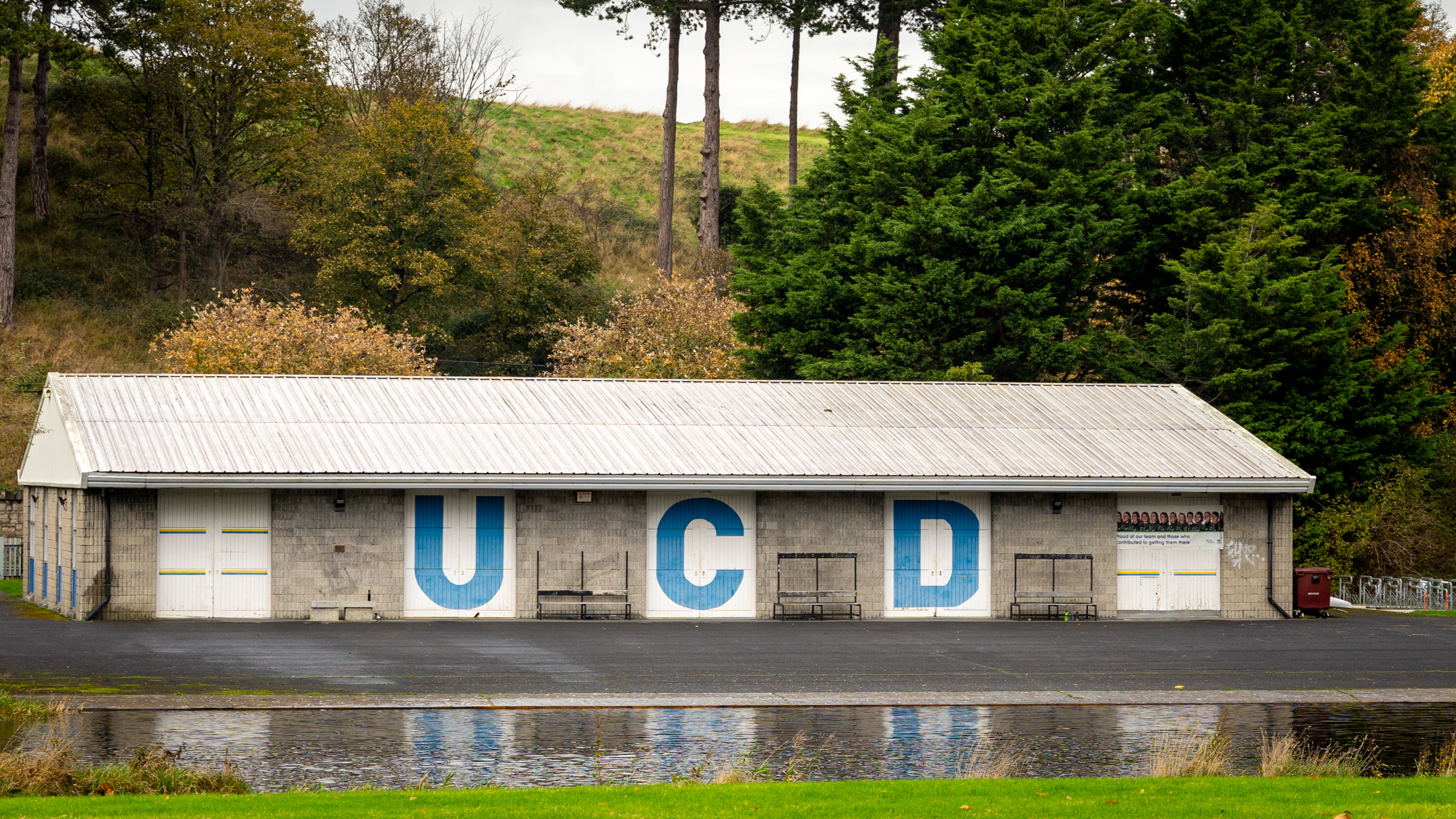
UCD's Clubhouse on the River Liffey.

The club's own boathouse is in Islandbridge while its gym facilities are based on campus at University College Dublin. It also shares a boathouse at Blessington Lake with the Dublin Metropolitan group of rowing clubs.

== See also ==
- UCD Ladies Boat Club
