= Ireland at the 1948 Summer Olympics =

- IOC code: IRL
- NOC: Olympic Federation of Ireland
- Website: olympics.ie

in London
- Competitors: 72 in 9 sports
- Flag bearer: Paddy Carroll
- Medals: Gold 0 Silver 0 Bronze 0 Total 0

Summer Olympics appearances (overview)
- 1924; 1928; 1932; 1936; 1948; 1952; 1956; 1960; 1964; 1968; 1972; 1976; 1980; 1984; 1988; 1992; 1996; 2000; 2004; 2008; 2012; 2016; 2020; 2024; 2028

Other related appearances
- Great Britain (1896–1920)

Ireland competed at the 1948 Summer Olympics in London, England. It was the first time that the country had competed in the Summer Olympics since 1932. A dispute between rival Irish Athletics governing bodies saw many Irish athletes barred from taking part in the Athletics competitions. 72 competitors, 68 men and 4 women, took part in 32 events in 9 sports.

== Athletics ==
Athlete	Event	Heat		Quarterfinals		Semifinal		Final	
Athlete	Event	Time	Rank	Time	Rank	Time	Rank	Time	Rank
John O'Donnell	Men's 100m	DNS		Did Not Advance					
Joe Kelly	Men's 100m	DNS		Did Not Advance					
Jimmy Reardon	Men's 400m	48.4	1	48.3	2	47.8	5	Did Not Advance	
Joe Kelly	Men's 800m	DNS		Did Not Advance					
Dermot McDermot	Men's 800m	DNS		Did Not Advance					
John Joe Barry	Men's 1500m	–				4:00.5	8	Did Not Advance	
John Joe Barry	Men's 5000m	DNF		–				Did Not Advance	
Paddy Fahey	Men's 10,000m	–						DNF	
Charles Denroche, Paul Dolan, Reggie Myles, Jimmy Reardon	Men's 4x400m Relay	DSQ		–				Did Not Advance	
Paddy Mulvhill	Men's marathon	–						2:57:35.0	26

== Basketball ==
Ireland made their only Olympic basketball appearance to date, losing all five of their games and finishing last of 23 teams.

== Diving ==
Men

Athlete	Event	Final	
Athlete	Event	Points	Rank
Eddie Heron	3 m springboard	WD	

== Fencing ==
Five fencers, four men and one woman, represented Ireland in 1948.

Men's foil

- Nick Thuillier
- Owen Tuohy
- Tom Smith

Men's team foil

- Owen Tuohy, Patrick Duffy, Tom Smith, Nick Thuillier

Women's foil

- Dorothy Dermody

== Rowing ==
Ireland had nine male rowers participate in one out of seven rowing events in 1948.

Men's eight

- Paddy Dooley
- Robin Tamplin
- Paddy Harold
- Barry McDonnell
- Danny Taylor
- Joe Hanly
- Morgan McElligott
- Tom Dowdall
- Denis Sugrue (cox)
