= Norway at the 1948 Summer Olympics =

- IOC code: NOR
- NOC: Norwegian Sports Federation

in London, United Kingdom 29 July – 14 August
- Competitors: 81 (77 men, 4 women) in 12 sports
- Flag bearer: Godtfred Holmvang (athletics)
- Medals Ranked 19th: Gold 1 Silver 3 Bronze 3 Total 7

Summer Olympics appearances (overview)
- 1900; ~~1904~~; 1908; 1912; 1920; 1924; 1928; 1932; 1936; 1948; 1952; 1956; 1960; 1964; 1968; 1972; 1976; 1980; 1984; 1988; 1992; 1996; 2000; 2004; 2008; 2012; 2016; 2020; 2024; 2028

Other related appearances
- 1906 Intercalated Games

Norway competed at the 1948 Summer Olympics in London, England. 81 competitors, 77 men and 4 women, took part in 50 events in 12 sports.

== Cycling ==
Four cyclists, all men, represented Norway in 1948.

Individual road race

- Lorang Christiansen
- Leif Flengsrud
- Erling Kristiansen
- Aage Myhrvold

Team road race

- Lorang Christiansen
- Leif Flengsrud
- Erling Kristiansen
- Aage Myhrvold

== Diving ==
Men

Athlete	Event	Final	
Athlete	Event	Points	Rank
Rolf Stigersand	10 m platform	97.93	9

Women

Athlete	Event	Final	
Athlete	Event	Points	Rank
Inger Nordbø	3 m springboard	70.86	15
Inger Nordbø	10 m platform	51.55	13

== Fencing ==
Five fencers, all men, represented Norway in 1948.

Men's épée

- Egill Knutzen
- Alfred Eriksen
- Claus Mørch Sr.

Men's team épée

- Johan von Koss, Egill Knutzen, Alfred Eriksen, Claus Mørch Sr., Sverre Gillebo

== Rowing ==
Norway had 14 male rowers participate in two out of seven rowing events in 1948.

Men's coxed four

- Arne Serck-Hanssen
- Gunnar Sandborg
- Sigurd Grønli
- Willy Evensen
- Thoralf Sandaker (cox)

Men's eight

- Kristoffer Lepsøe
- Thorstein Kråkenes
- Hans Hansen
- Halfdan Gran Olsen
- Harald Kråkenes
- Leif Næss
- Thor Pedersen
- Carl Monssen
- Sigurd Monssen (cox)

== Shooting ==
Nine shooters represented Norway in 1948. Willy Røgeberg won a bronze medal in the 300 metre pistol event.

25 metre pistol

- Birger Bühring-Andersen
- Odd Bonde Nielsen
- Hans Aasnæs

50 metre pistol

- Gunnar Svendsen
- Mauritz Amundsen

300 metre rifle

- Willy Røgeberg
- Halvor Kongsjorden
- Odd Sannes

50 metre rifle

- Halvor Kongsjorden
- Thore Skredegaard
- Willy Røgeberg

== Swimming ==
Women

Athlete	Event	Heat		Semifinal		Final	
Athlete	Event	Time	Rank	Time	Rank	Time	Rank
Bea Ballintijn	100 m backstroke	1:22.1	18	Did not advance			
