= The Boat Race 1948 =

94th Boat Race
- Date: 27 March 1948
- Winner: Cambridge
- Margin of victory: 5 lengths
- Winning time: 17 minutes 50 seconds
- Overall record (Cambridge–Oxford): 50–43
- Umpire: Claude Taylor (Cambridge)

Other races
- Women's winner: Cambridge

The 94th Boat Race took place on 27 March 1948. Held annually, the Boat Race is a side-by-side rowing race between crews from the Universities of Oxford and Cambridge along the River Thames. In a race umpired by the former rower Claude Taylor, Cambridge won by five lengths in a record time of 17 minutes and 50 seconds, beating the existing record set in the 1934 race. The victory, their second in a row, took the overall record in the race to 50–43 in Cambridge's favour.

== Background ==
The Boat Race is a side-by-side rowing competition between the University of Oxford (sometimes referred to as the "Dark Blues") and the University of Cambridge (sometimes referred to as the "Light Blues"). First held in 1829, the race takes place on the 4.2 miles (6.8 km) Championship Course on the River Thames in southwest London. The rivalry is a major point of honour between the two universities; it is followed throughout the United Kingdom and, as of 2014, broadcast worldwide. Cambridge went into the race as reigning champions, having won the 1947 race by ten lengths, and led overall with 50 victories to Oxford's 43 (excluding the "dead heat" of 1877).

Oxford's coaches were R. E. Eason (who rowed for the Dark Blues in the 1924 race), J. H. Page and D. T. Raikes (who represented Oxford in the 1920, 1921 and 1922 races). Cambridge were coached by F. E. Hellyer (who rowed for the Light Blues in the 1910 and 1911 races), Kenneth Payne (who rowed for Cambridge in the 1932 and 1934 races), Harold Rickett (a Light Blue three times between 1930 and 1932) and Peter Haig-Thomas (a four-time Light Blue between 1902 and 1905). The umpire for the race was the former Cambridge rower Claude Taylor who had represented the Light Blues in the 1901, 1902 and 1903 races.

The rowing correspondent for The Manchester Guardian anticipated a close race: "the prospects of Oxford and Cambridge for this year's University Boat-race on Saturday have now become much more even". His counterpart at The Times was in agreement: "it really seems that whichever crew gets off best in the first two minutes will probably win the race."

== Crews ==
The Oxford crew weighed an average of 12 st 9.375 lb (80.3 kg), 1.375 pounds (0.62 kg) per rower more than their opponents. Cambridge saw three rowers return to the crew with Boat Race experience, including their stroke A. P. Mellows. Oxford's boat also contained three former Blues, J. R. W. Gleave, P. N. Brodie and A. J. R. Purssell, all of whom were making their third appearances. Three of the participants were registered as non-British: Oxford's G. C. Fisk and W. W. Woodward, and Cambridge's Brian Harrison were all from Australia.

Seat	Oxford			Cambridge		
Seat	Name	College	Weight	Name	College	Weight
Bow	G. C. Fisk	Oriel	12 st 1.5 lb	A. P. Mellows	Clare	12 st 1 lb
2	J. R. W. Gleave	Magdalen	12 st 7 lb	D. J. C. Meyrick	Trinity Hall	11 st 4 lb
3	A. D. Rowe	Trinity	12 st 12 lb	P. A. de Giles	Queens'	12 st 3 lb
4	W. W. Woodward	Brasenose	13 st 3.5 lb	G. C. Richardson (P)	Magdalene	12 st 11 lb
5	R. A. Noel	Christ Church	12 st 13.5 lb	A. B. C. Harrison	1st & 3rd Trinity	13 st 12 lb
6	R. L. Arundel	Merton	14 st 4 lb	E. A. P. Bircher	Christ's	13 st 8 lb
7	P. N. Brodie (P)	Oriel	11 st 8 lb	M. C. Lapage	Selwyn	13 st 0 lb
Stroke	A. J. R. Purssell	Oriel	11 st 11.5 lb	C. D. R. Barton	Jesus	11 st 11 lb
Cox	R. G. B. Faulkner	Trinity	9 st 0 lb	K. T. Lindsay	Jesus	8 st 13 lb
Source: (P) – boat club president

== Race ==
The Championship Course along which the Boat Race is contested

Cambridge won the toss and elected to start from the Middlesex station, handing the Surrey side of the river to Oxford. The race was started at 3:30 p.m. by Taylor. The Light Blues out-rated their opponents from the start but soon after their number six, Paul Bircher "caught a crab", allowing Oxford to take a half-length lead which they extended to three-quarters of a length by Craven Steps. Despite having stopped to allow Bircher to recover his oar, Cambridge drew level and were over a quarter of a length ahead by the time the crews passed the Mile Post, yet nine seconds off record pace and rowing into a head wind. Cambridge were a length ahead at Harrods Furniture Depository and drew clear as the boats passed below Hammersmith Bridge.

As the crews passed the training ship HMS Stork, Cambridge began to draw away and were two lengths ahead by Chiswick Steps. With a strong tailwind along Corney Reach, the Light Blues continued to pull ahead and passed below Barnes Bridge four lengths ahead, and six seconds ahead of the course record. Cambridge passed the finishing post five lengths ahead in a time of 17 minutes 50 seconds. The victory, Cambridge's second in a row, and third in the last four races, took the overall record in the race to 50–43 in their favour. The special correspondent writing in The Observer called it "the maddest Boat Race for years". The Times' rowing correspondent suggested it was "a great triumph for the Cambridge coaches, who so often seem able to produce something out of the bag which has not been apparent in practice." Writing in The Manchester Guardian, the rowing correspondent noted that it was "strange that Cambridge had never shown anything like this form in practice".
