= Lebranchu =

Lebranchu is a French surname.

== List of people with the surname ==
- Marylise Lebranchu (born 1947), French politician
- Roger Lebranchu (1922–2025), French rower

== See also ==
- Lebranche mullet
