= University College Boat Club =

University College Boat Club may refer to:

- University College Boat Club (Durham) the rowing club for University College at Durham University
- University College Boat Club (Oxford)
- University College London Boat Club the rowing club for University College London
- UCD Boat Club the rowing club for University College Dublin
