= Luis Machado =

Luis or Luís Machado may refer to:

- Luís Machado (rower) (1925–2000), Portuguese rower
- Luis Alberto Machado (1932–2016), Venezuelan lawyer, author, and politician
- Luis Machado (footballer, born 1991), Uruguayan footballer
- Luís Machado (footballer, born 1992), Portuguese footballer
