= 1949 European Rowing Championships =

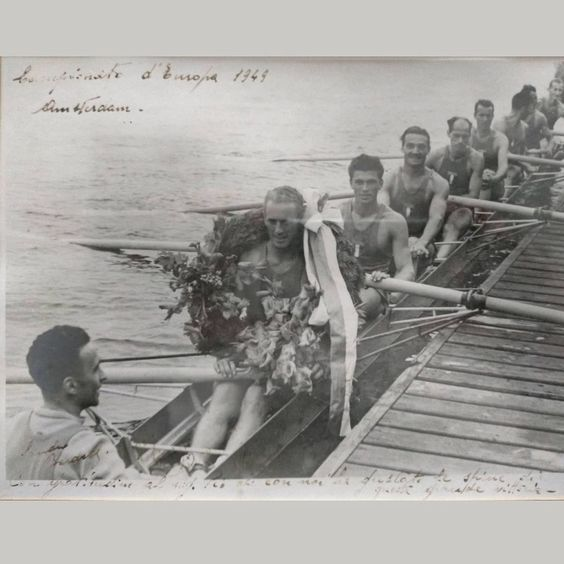
- Canottieri Varese at the 1949 European Rowing Championships
- Venue: Bosbaan
- Location: Amsterdam, the Netherlands
- Dates: August

The 1949 European Rowing Championships were rowing championships held on the Bosbaan in the Dutch city of Amsterdam. The competition was for men only, they competed in all seven Olympic boat classes (M1x, M2x, M2-, M2+, M4-, M4+, M8+) in late August.

== Medal summary – men's events ==
Event	Gold		Silver		Bronze	
Event	Country & rowers	Time	Country & rowers	Time	Country & rowers	Time
M1x	United States; John Kelly	7:08	Czechoslovakia; František Vrba		Switzerland; Hansjakob Keller	
M2x	Denmark; Ebbe Parsner; Aage Larsen	6:57.2	Italy; Mario Ustolin; Giorgio Cavallini		France; Jacques Maillet; Christian Guilbert	
M2-	Sweden; Evert Gunnarsson; Bernt Torberntsson	7:28.2	Belgium; Charles Van Antwerpen; Jos Rosa		Italy; Felice Fanetti; Bruno Boni	
M2+	Italy; Giuseppe Ramani; Aldo Tarlao; Luciano Marion (cox)	7:55.0	Denmark; Leif Hermansen; Ole Scavenius Jensen; John Vilhelmsen (cox)	7:55.2	Belgium; Eugène Jacobs; Hippolyte Mattelé; Cyrille Proost (cox)	
M4-	Italy; Giuseppe Moioli; Elio Morille; Giovanni Invernizzi; Franco Faggi		Denmark; Eivin Kristensen; Erik Thorsen; Richard Littrup; Carl Johan Petersen		Norway; Carl Monssen; Harald Kråkenes; Thorstein Kråkenes; Kristoffer Lepsøe	
M4+	Italy; Vladimiro Bobig; Mario Tagliapietra; Romeo Santin; Marcello Basso; Eugenio Suzzi (cox)	6:45.2	Switzerland; Walter Näpflin; Carmelito Bolli; Franz Zumbühl; Walter Lüchinger; Walter Ludin (cox)		Denmark; Niels Kristensen; Ove Nielsen; Peter Hansen; Bent Blach Petersen; Sv. E. Larsen (cox)	
M8+	Italy; Angelo Fioretti; Mario Acchini; Fortunato Maninetti; Bonifacio De Bortoli; Enrico Ruberti; Pietro Sessa; Ezio Acchini; Luigi Gandini; Alessandro Bardelli (cox)	6:11	Czechoslovakia; Karel Vaněk; Bogdan Kopecký; Josef Kalaš; František Petříček; Antonín Lánský; Jaroslav Vavřena; Richard Hereyk; Václav Roubík; Josef Šindelář (cox)		Netherlands; Gijsbertus Dutry van Haeften; Willem Algie; André Nijhof; Hans Bokelman; Cornélis Hoogenboom; Richard Buss; Hendrik Druyff; Gerard Kemperman; Max Rood (cox)	
