= Walter Robertson =

Walter Robertson may refer to:

- Walter M. Robertson (1888–1954), United States Army officer
- Walter S. Robertson, United States assistant secretary of state, 1953–1959
- Walter W. Robertson (1845–1907), Scottish architect
- Walter Robertson (artist), Irish miniature painter

== See also ==
- Walt Robertson, Canadian rower
