= Patrick Dooley =

Patrick or Paddy Dooley may refer to

- Patrick Dooley (politician) (1910–1982), Irish Fianna Fáil politician
- Patrick Dooley (cricketer) (born 1997), Australian cricketer
- Paddy Dooley (rower) (1926–2008), Irish rower
