= José Machado =

José Machado may refer to:

- José Machado (rower) (1927–2004), Portuguese Olympic rower
- José Ramón Machado Ventura (born 1930), vice-president of Cuba (2008–2013)
- José Machado (São Tomé and Príncipe), Portuguese governor of São Tomé and Príncipe (1955–56)
- José Manuel Machado (1756–1852), Spanish soldier, ranchero, early citizen of the pueblo of San Diego
