= Willumsen =

Willumsen is a surname. Notable people with the surname include:

- Charles Willumsen (1918–1984), Danish rower
- Dorrit Willumsen (born 1940), Danish writer
- Jens Ferdinand Willumsen (1863–1958), Danish artist, architect and photographer

- Willumsens Museum, in Frederikssund, Denmark

- Mary Willumsen (1884–1961), Danish photographer
