= Alujević =

Alujević is a surname. Notable people with the surname include:

- Klement Alujević (1920–1984), Croatian rower
- Zdravko Alujević (born 1931), Croatian footballer
