= Marvin Hammond =

Canadian rower

Personal information
- Born: 23 October 1926; Hamilton, Ontario, Canada
- Died: 14 June 2003 (aged 76); North Carolina, United States

Sport
- Sport: Rowing

Marvin Hammond (23 October 1926 – 14 June 2003) was a Canadian rower. He competed in the men's eight event at the 1948 Summer Olympics.
