= Fortunato Maninetti =

Italian rower

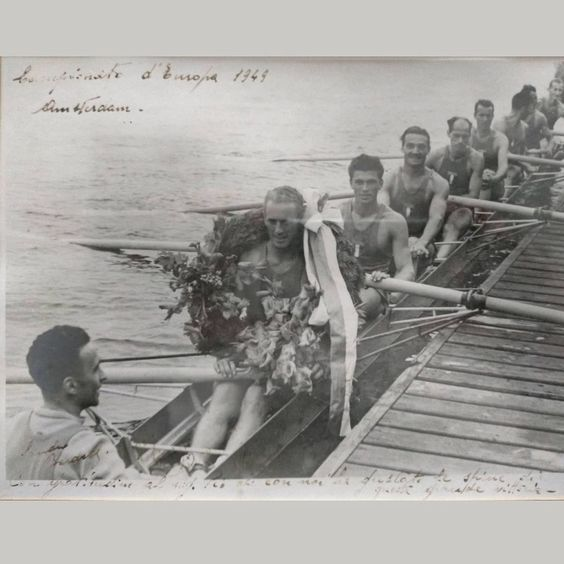

Personal information
- Born: 19 August 1920 Varese, Italy
- Died: 9 January 1997 (aged 76)

Sport
- Sport: Rowing
Medal record
Men's rowing
Representing Italy
European Rowing Championships
Gold medal – first place	1947 Lucerne	Eight
Gold medal – first place	1949 Amsterdam	Eight
Gold medal – first place	1950 Milan	Eight

Fortunato Maninetti (19 August 1920 – 9 January 1997) was an Italian rower. He competed at the 1948 Summer Olympics in London with the men's eight where they were eliminated in the semi-final.
