= Robert Christmas =

Canadian rower

Personal information
- Nationality: Canadian
- Born: 22 March 1924
- Died: 20 January 2000 (aged 75); Hamilton, Ontario, Canada

Sport
- Sport: Rowing

Robert Harry Bernard Christmas (22 March 1924 – 20 January 2000) was a Canadian rower. He competed in the men's eight event at the 1948 Summer Olympics.
