= Walter Lüchinger =

Swiss rower (1926–2021)

Personal information
- Born: 26 February 1926
- Died: 26 August 2021 (aged 95)

Sport
- Sport: Rowing
Medal record
Men's rowing
Representing Switzerland
European Rowing Championships
Silver medal – second place	1949 Amsterdam	Coxed four
Silver medal – second place	1950 Milan	Coxed pair
Silver medal – second place	1951 Mâcon	Coxed pair

Walter Lüchinger (26 February 1926 – 26 August 2021) was a Swiss rower. He competed at the 1952 Summer Olympics in Helsinki with the men's coxed pair where they were eliminated in the round one repêchage.
