= Ricardo da Benta =

Portuguese rower (1923–2006)

Personal information
- Full name: Ricardo dos Santos da Benta
- Nationality: Portuguese
- Born: 25 November 1923 Vera Cruz, Aveiro, Portugal
- Died: 22 October 2006 (aged 82) Glória e Vera Cruz, Portugal

Sport
- Sport: Rowing

Ricardo dos Santos da Benta (25 November 1923 – 22 October 2006) was a Portuguese rower. He competed in the men's eight event at the 1948 Summer Olympics. Da Benta died in Glória e Vera Cruz on 22 October 2006, at the age of 82.
