= Philippe Fauveau =

French rower (1926–2023)

Personal information
- Full name: Desire Philippe Fauveau
- Nationality: French
- Born: 7 June 1926; Paris, France
- Died: 8 March 2023 (aged 96); Presles, Val-d'Oise, France

Sport
- Sport: Rowing

Desire Philippe Fauveau (7 June 1926 – 8 March 2023) was a French rower. He competed in the men's eight event at the 1948 Summer Olympics. Fauveau died in Presles, Val-d'Oise on 8 March 2023, at the age of 96.
