= Václav Roubík =

Czech rower

Personal information
- Born: 16 August 1919 Prague, Czechoslovakia
- Died: 22 June 2013 (aged 93)

Sport
- Sport: Rowing
Medal record
Men's rowing
Representing Czechoslovakia
European Rowing Championships
Silver medal – second place	1947 Lucerne	Coxless four
Silver medal – second place	1949 Amsterdam	Eight

Václav Roubík (16 August 1919 – 22 June 2013) was a Czech rower who competed in the 1948 Summer Olympics.
