= Jean Bocahut =

French rower

Personal information
- Nationality: French
- Born: 29 September 1919; Paris, France
- Died: 19 August 1995 (aged 75)

Sport
- Sport: Rowing

Jean Bocahut (20 September 1919 – 19 August 1995) was a French rower. He competed in the men's eight event at the 1948 Summer Olympics.
