= Duško Đorđević =

Croatian rower

Duško Ðorđević
Personal information
- Full name: Dušan Ðorđević
- Nationality: Yugoslavia
- Died: before 2010

Sport
- Sport: Rowing

Dušan "Duško" Ðorđević (died before 2010) was a Serbian rower. He competed for Yugoslavia in two events at the 1948 Summer Olympics.
