= Angelo Fioretti =

Italian rower

Personal information
- Born: 30 March 1918 Varese, Italy
- Died: 29 September 2001 (aged 83)

Sport
- Sport: Rowing
Medal record
Men's rowing
Representing Italy
European Rowing Championships
Gold medal – first place	1947 Lucerne	Eight
Gold medal – first place	1949 Amsterdam	Eight
Gold medal – first place	1950 Milan	Eight

Angelo Fioretti (30 March 1918 – 29 September 2001) was an Italian rower. He competed at the 1948 Summer Olympics in London with the men's eight where they were eliminated in the semi-final.
