= René Boucher (rower) =

French rower (1928–2018)

Personal information
- Nationality: French
- Born: 1 December 1928; Meulan-en-Yvelines, France
- Died: 3 November 2018 (aged 89)

Sport
- Sport: Rowing

René Boucher (1 December 1928 – 3 November 2018) was a French rower. He competed in the men's eight event at the 1948 Summer Olympics.
