= Pierre Sauvestre =

French rower

Personal information
- Nationality: French
- Born: 15 April 1915
- Died: 29 November 1980 (aged 65)

Sport
- Sport: Rowing

Pierre Sauvestre (15 April 1915 – 29 November 1980) was a French rower. He competed in the men's eight event at the 1948 Summer Olympics.
