= Bonifacio De Bortoli =

Italian rower

Personal information
- Born: 8 May 1924 Varese, Kingdom of Italy
- Died: 13 December 1977 (aged 53)

Sport
- Sport: Rowing
Medal record
Men's rowing
Representing Italy
European Rowing Championships
Gold medal – first place	1947 Lucerne	Eight
Gold medal – first place	1949 Amsterdam	Eight
Gold medal – first place	1950 Milan	Eight

Bonifacio De Bortoli (8 May 1924 – 13 December 1977) was an Italian rower. He competed at the 1948 Summer Olympics in London with the men's eight where they were eliminated in the semi-final.
