= Erik Aschehoug =

French rower

Personal information
- Nationality: French
- Born: 29 March 1926; Neuilly-sur-Seine, France
- Died: 27 March 2001 (aged 74); Charente, France

Sport
- Sport: Rowing

Erik Aschehoug (29 March 1926 – 27 March 2001) was a French rower. He competed in the men's eight event at the 1948 Summer Olympics.
