= 1950 European Rowing Championships =

- Venue: Idroscalo
- Location: Milan, Italy
- Dates: August

The 1950 European Rowing Championships were rowing championships held on the Idroscalo in the Italian city of Milan. The competition was for men only, they competed in all seven Olympic boat classes (M1x, M2x, M2-, M2+, M4-, M4+, M8+).

== Background ==
With rowing officials from around the world coming to the regatta, the International Rowing Federation (FISA) held an ordinary congress on 30 August 1950 in Milan. It was at that congress that it was decided that women's rowing would be trialled. The first test event over the shorter agreed 1,000 m distance was run at the 1951 European Rowing Championships in Mâcon a day prior to the men's competition starting.

== Medal summary – men's events ==
| Event | Gold | | Silver | | Bronze | |
|---|---|---|---|---|---|---|
| Event | Country & rowers | Time | Country & rowers | Time | Country & rowers | Time |
| M1x | Denmark; Erik Larsen | | Netherlands; Tom Neumeier | | Switzerland; Thomas Keller | |
| M2x | Denmark; Ebbe Parsner; Aage Larsen | | Italy; Antonio Balossi; Lodovico Sommaruga | | Switzerland; Arnoldo Gianella; Ilvo Prosperi | |
| M2- | Switzerland; Hans Kalt; Kurt Schmid | | Italy; Erio Bettega; Nicolo Simone | | Belgium; Charles Van Antwerpen; Jos Rosa | |
| M2+ | Italy; Giuseppe Ramani; Aldo Tarlao; Luciano Marion (cox) | | Switzerland; Alex Siebenhaar; Walter Lüchinger; Walter Ludin (cox) | | Belgium; Eugène Jacobs; Hippolyte Mattelé; Cyrille Proost (cox) | |
| M4- | Italy; Giuseppe Moioli; Elio Morille; Giovanni Invernizzi; Franco Faggi | | Denmark; Ib Nielsen; Georg Nielsen; Børge Hougaard; Holger Larsen | | Switzerland; Gaston Sermier; Bernard Guex; Marcel Giddey; Claude Brélaz | |
| M4+ | Denmark; Niels Kristensen; Ove Nielsen; Peter Hansen; Bent Blach Petersen; Eivin Kristensen (cox) | | Italy; Romeo Santin; Amadeo Scarpi; Marcello Basso; Albino Trevisan; Giovanni Vorano (cox) | | Netherlands; Gijsbertus Dutry van Haeften; Rudolphus Johannes van Geuns; Gerhard van Olden; Willem Algie; Wilhelm Engelbrecht (cox) | |
| M8+ | Italy; Angelo Fioretti; Pietro Sessa; Fortunato Maninetti; Bonifacio De Bortoli; Mario de Bortoli; Uberto Urbani; Mario Chicco; Luigi Gandini; Alessandro Bardelli (cox) | | Denmark; Jörgen Carlsen; Ib Höjfang; Henry Skovgaard; Otto Prior-Buse; Poul Martin Poulsen; Aksel Bonde; Helge Muxoll Schrøder; Jörn Kjeldsen; S. A. Langberg Nielsen (cox) | | Great Britain; J. L. M. Crick; Brian Lloyd; Alistair MacLeod; William Windham; R. K. Hayward; James Crowden; David Macklin; Harry Almond; R. J. Blow (cox) | |
