= Josef Kalaš =

Czechoslovak rower

Sport
- Sport: Rowing
Medal record
Men's rowing
Representing Czechoslovakia
European Rowing Championships
Silver medal – second place	1949 Amsterdam	Eight

Josef Kalaš is a Czechoslovak rower. He competed at the 1948 Summer Olympics in London with the men's coxless four where they were eliminated in the round one repechage.
