= Bill McConnell (rower) =

Canadian rower

Personal information
- Born: 6 September 1927; Hamilton, Ontario, Canada
- Died: 11 December 1985 (aged 58); Hamilton, Ontario, Canada

Sport
- Sport: Rowing

William John McConnell (6 September 1927 – 11 December 1985) was a Canadian rower. He competed in the men's eight event at the 1948 Summer Olympics.
