= Alessandro Bardelli (rowing) =

Italian rower (1914–2009)

Personal information
- Born: 28 April 1914 Varese, Italy
- Died: 24 August 2009 (aged 95)

Sport
- Sport: Rowing
Medal record
Men's rowing
Representing Italy
European Rowing Championships
Gold medal – first place	1947 Lucerne	Eight
Gold medal – first place	1949 Amsterdam	Eight
Gold medal – first place	1950 Milan	Eight

Alessandro Bardelli (28 April 1914 – 24 August 2009) was an Italian coxswain. He competed at the 1948 Summer Olympics in London with the men's eight where they were eliminated in the semi-final.
