= Juan Ángel Aichino =

Argentine rower

Personal information
- Born: 19 May 1928; Larrechea, Argentina
- Died: 23 December 2004 (aged 76)

Sport
- Sport: Rowing

Juan Ángel Aichino (19 May 1928 – 23 December 2004) was an Argentine rower. He competed in the men's eight event at the 1948 Summer Olympics.
