= Charles Van Antwerpen =

Belgian rower (1925–2019)

Personal information
- Born: Charles Georges Van Antwerpen; 10 June 1925 Antwerp, Belgium
- Died: 12 December 2019 (aged 94) Fréjus, France

Sport
- Sport: Rowing
Medal record
Men's rowing
Representing Belgium
European Rowing Championships
Silver medal – second place	1949 Amsterdam	Coxless pair
Bronze medal – third place	1950 Milan	Coxless pair
Gold medal – first place	1951 Mâcon	Coxless four

Charles Georges Van Antwerpen (10 June 1925 – 12 December 2019) was a Belgian rower. He competed at the 1948 Summer Olympics in London with the men's coxless pair where they were eliminated in the round one repechage.
