= Martin Feeley =

Irish surgeon and rower (1950–2023)

Personal information
- Nationality: Irish
- Born: 13 August 1950
- Died: 21 December 2023 (aged 73)

Sport
- Sport: Rowing

Thomas Martin Feeley (13 August 1950 – 21 December 2023) was an Irish vascular surgeon and rower. He competed in the men's coxless four event at the 1976 Summer Olympics.

== Biography ==
Feeley graduated from University College Dublin (UCD) in 1974 with a degree in medicine (MB BCh BAO). In 1979, he was conferred with the diploma of Fellowship of the Royal College of Surgeons in Ireland. He went on to take a master's degree in surgery at the National University of Ireland in 1985.

Feeley remained involved with the UCD Boat Club as a coach in later years, and was awarded a "Graduate of the Year" sports award by the university in 2017.

In 2015, he took up the role of group clinical director at the Dublin Midlands Hospital Group, having previously been a consultant vascular surgeon and clinical director at the Adelaide and Meath Hospital, Dublin, incorporating the National Children's Hospital (now known as Tallaght University Hospital). He resigned from the role in 2020.

Feeley died on 21 December 2023, at the age of 73.
