= Peter Hansen (rower) =

Danish rower (1921–2018)

Personal information
- Born: 18 November 1921 Holme, Aarhus, Denmark
- Died: 26 November 2018 (aged 97)

Sport
- Sport: Rowing
Medal record
Men's rowing
Representing Denmark
European Championships
Bronze medal – third place	1949 Amsterdam	Coxed four
Gold medal – first place	1950 Milan	Coxed four

Peter Hansen (18 November 1921 – 26 November 2018) was a Danish rower. He competed at the 1952 Summer Olympics in Helsinki with the men's coxed four where they were eliminated in the semi-final repêchage. Hansen died on 26 November 2018, at the age of 97.
