= Pietro Sessa =

Italian rower

Personal information
- Born: 3 October 1927
- Died: 11 April 1993 (aged 65)

Sport
- Sport: Rowing
Medal record
Men's rowing
Representing Italy
European Rowing Championships
Gold medal – first place	1947 Lucerne	Eight
Gold medal – first place	1949 Amsterdam	Eight
Gold medal – first place	1950 Milan	Eight

Pietro Sessa (3 October 1927 – 11 April 1993) was an Italian rower. He competed at the 1948 Summer Olympics in London with the men's eight where they were eliminated in the semi-final.
