= Rubén Cabral =

Argentine rower

Personal information
- Born: 20 March 1919; Rosario, Santa Fe, Argentina
- Died: 25 September 2008 (aged 89)

Sport
- Sport: Rowing

Rubén Cabral (20 March 1919 – 25 September 2008) was an Argentine rower. He competed in the men's eight event at the 1948 Summer Olympics.
