= Niels Kristensen (rower) =

Danish rower (1920–1999)

Personal information
- Born: 12 December 1920 Blåhøj, Denmark
- Died: 2 January 1999 (aged 78)

Sport
- Sport: Rowing
Medal record
Men's rowing
Representing Denmark
European Rowing Championships
Bronze medal – third place	1949 Amsterdam	Coxed four
Gold medal – first place	1950 Milan	Coxed four

Niels Kristensen (12 December 1920 – 2 January 1999) was a Danish rower. He competed at the 1952 Summer Olympics in Helsinki with the men's coxed four where they were eliminated in the semi-final repêchage. Kristensen died on 2 January 1999, at the age of 78.
