= Pascual Batista =

Argentine rower

Personal information
- Born: 9 May 1926; Rosario, Santa Fe, Argentina
- Died: 30 June 2004 (aged 78)

Sport
- Sport: Rowing

Pascual Batista (9 May 1926 – 30 June 2004) was an Argentine rower. He competed in the men's eight event at the 1948 Summer Olympics.
