= Christian Bove =

Argentine rower

Personal information
- Born: 8 May 1920; Buenos Aires, Argentina
- Died: 5 November 2007 (aged 87); Rosario, Santa Fe, Argentina

Sport
- Sport: Rowing

Christian Bove (8 May 1920 – 5 November 2007) was an Argentine rower. He competed in the men's eight event at the 1948 Summer Olympics.
