= Josef Schejbal (rower) =

Czechoslovak rower 1922–1977

Personal information
- Born: 12 August 1922 Libčice nad Vltavou, Czechoslovakia
- Died: April 1977 New York City, U.S.

Sport
- Sport: Rowing
Medal record
Men's rowing
Representing Czechoslovakia
European Rowing Championships
Silver medal – second place	1947 Lucerne	Coxless four

Josef Schejbal (12 August 1922 – April 1977) was a Czechoslovak rower. He competed at the 1948 Summer Olympics in London with the men's coxless four where they were eliminated in the round one repêchage.
