= Peter Green (rower) =

Canadian rower

Personal information
- Nationality: Canadian
- Born: 15 February 1920; South Wellington, British Columbia, Canada
- Died: 24 April 2011 (aged 91); Victoria, British Columbia, Canada

Sport
- Sport: Rowing

Peter Green (15 February 1920 – 24 April 2011) was a Canadian rower. He competed in the men's eight event at the 1948 Summer Olympics.
