= Mario Guerci =

Argentine rower (1913–1990)

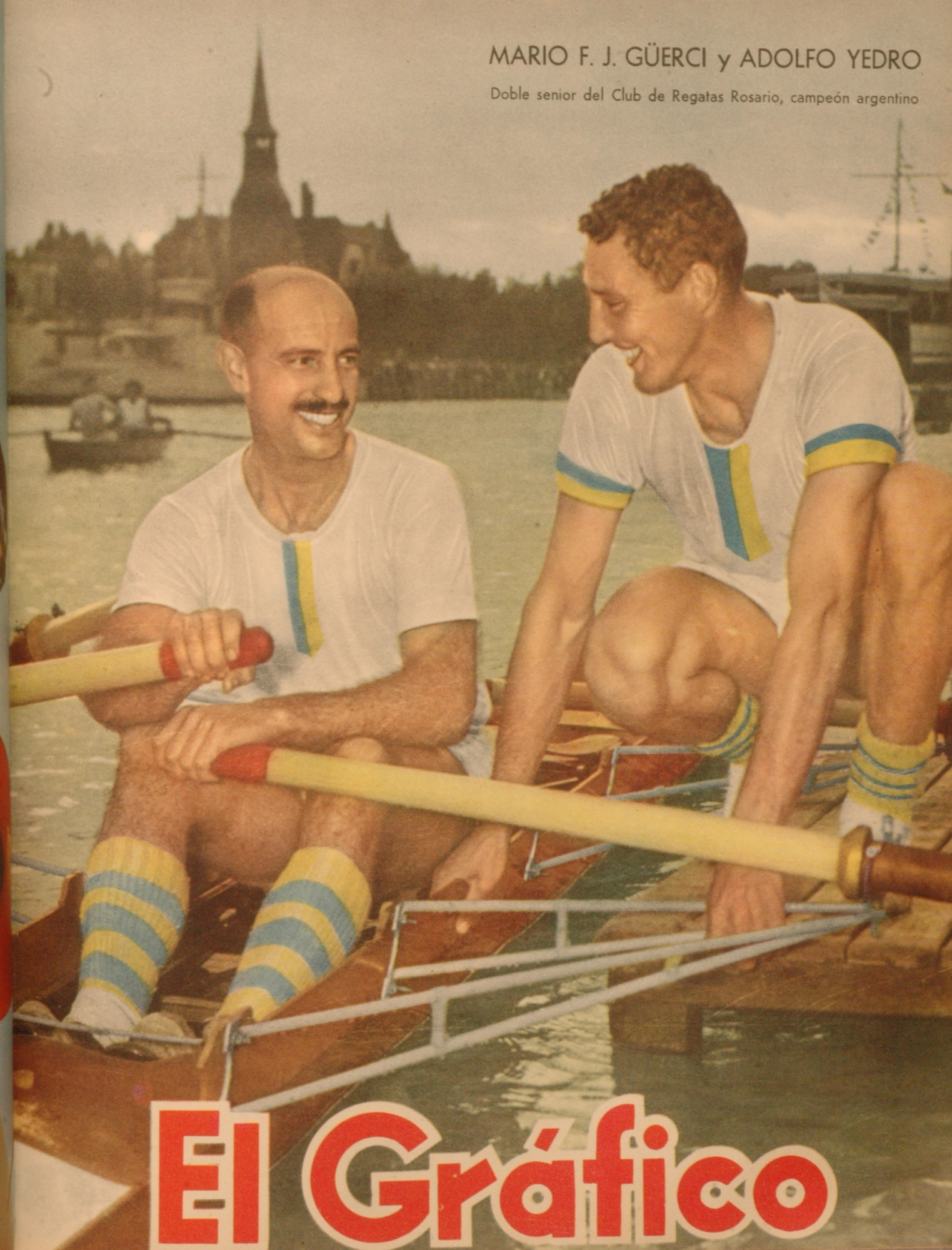

Personal information
- Born: 14 January 1913 Buenos Aires, Argentina
- Died: 13 October 1990 (aged 77)

Sport
- Sport: Rowing

Mario Guerci (14 January 1913 – 13 October 1990) was an Argentine rower. He competed in the men's eight event at the 1948 Summer Olympics.
