= Carlos Amado =

Argentine rower (c. 1924–1985)

Personal information
- Full name: Carlos Amado Köhli
- Nationality: Argentine
- Born: c. 1924
- Died: 13 November 1985 San Fernando, Argentina

Sport
- Sport: Rowing

Carlos Amado (c. 1924 – 13 November 1985) was an Argentine rower. He competed in the men's eight event at the 1948 Summer Olympics.
