= Carlos Roque (rower) =

Portuguese rower (1924–2002)

Personal information
- Full name: Carlos do Roque
- Nationality: Portuguese
- Born: 1 February 1924 Vera Cruz, Aveiro, Portugal
- Died: 4 February 2002 (aged 78) Glória e Vera Cruz, Portugal

Sport
- Sport: Rowing

Carlos do Roque (1 February 1924 – 4 February 2002) was a Portuguese rower. He competed in the men's eight event at the 1948 Summer Olympics. Roque died in Glória e Vera Cruz on 4 February 2002, at the age of 78.
