= Alfred Stefani =

Canadian rower

Personal information
- Nationality: Canadian
- Born: August 28, 1926
- Died: October 2, 1992 (aged 66)

Sport
- Sport: Rowing

Alfred Stefani (August 28, 1926 – October 2, 1992) was a Canadian rower. He competed in the men's eight event at the 1948 Summer Olympics.
