= 1947 European Rowing Championships =

- Venue: Rotsee
- Location: Lucerne, Switzerland
- Nations: 15

The 1947 European Rowing Championships were rowing championships held on the Rotsee in the Swiss city of Lucerne. The competition was for men only, they competed in all seven Olympic boat classes (M1x, M2x, M2-, M2+, M4-, M4+, M8+), and 15 nations participated. It was the first European Rowing Championships held after World War II, and it was the second time that the regatta was held on the Rotsee; the previous regatta was in 1934.

== Medal summary – men's events ==
Event	Gold		Silver		Bronze	
Event	Country & rowers	Time	Country & rowers	Time	Country & rowers	Time
M1x	France; Jean Séphériadès		Belgium; Ben Piessens		Switzerland; Hansjakob Keller	
M2x	Netherlands; Henk van der Meer; Tom Neumeier		Switzerland; Arnoldo Gianella; Ilvo Prosperi		Czechoslovakia; Jaroslav Vavrena; Frantisek Vrba	
M2-	Denmark; Søren Jensen; Jørn Snogdahl		Austria; Gert Watzke; Kurt Watzke		France; Jérôme Havlik; Pierre Rivière	
M2+	Hungary; Béla Zsitnik; Antal Szendey; Szaniszlo Latinovits (cox)		Italy; Giovanni Steffè; Aldo Tarlao; Alvino Grio (cox)		Denmark; Finn Pedersen; Tage Henriksen; Carl-Ebbe Andersen (cox)	
M4-	Italy; Giuseppe Moioli; Elio Morille; Giovanni Invernizzi; Franco Faggi		Czechoslovakia; Karel Vaněk; Josef Schejbal; Jiří Romovacek; Václav Roubík		Switzerland; Hermann Betschart; Ernst Rufli; Gotthard Oehninger; Karl Schmid	
M4+	France; Gaston Piéddeloup; Claude Loewenstein; Gérald Maquat; Jean Roulin; Marcel Boigegrain (cox)		Italy; Reginaldo Polloni; Riccardo Cerutti; Renato Macario; Francesco Gotti; Domenico Cambieri (cox)		Czechoslovakia; Bogdan Kopecky; Miroslav Merk; Miroslav Ptacek; Jaroslav Dlohoska; Zdenek Dvorak (cox)	
M8+	Italy; Angelo Fioretti; Mario Acchini; Fortunato Maninetti; Bonifacio De Bortoli; Enrico Ruberti; Pietro Sessa; Ezio Acchini; Luigi Gandini; Alessandro Bardelli (cox)		Denmark; Charles Willumsen; Holger Larsen; Niels Rasmussen; Ib Nielsen; Jarl Emcken; Poul Korup; Børge Hougaard; Gerhardt Sørensen; Niels Wamberg (cox)		Switzerland; Walter Stapfer; Erich Schriever; Rudolf Reichling; Peter Stebler; Émile Knecht; Heiri Zoller; Fritz Stapfer; Jakob Knöpfel; Franco Brentani (cox)	
