= Ove Nielsen =

Danish rower (1924–2008)

Personal information
- Born: 15 November 1924
- Died: 2008 (aged 84)

Sport
- Sport: Rowing
Medal record
Men's rowing
Representing Denmark
European Rowing Championships
Bronze medal – third place	1949 Amsterdam	Coxed four
Gold medal – first place	1950 Milan	Coxed four

Ove Nielsen (15 November 1924 – 2008) was a Danish rower. He competed at the 1952 Summer Olympics in Helsinki with the men's coxed four where they were eliminated in the semi-final repêchage.

Nielsen later moved to Lillehammer in Norway where he owned the Bellevue guest house for many years. During the 1994 Winter Olympics, he offered rooms for free in contrast to other local hotels that asked for premium prices. From the proceeds of selling his guest house, he bought the old ferry Mjøshfergen in 2006 to convert it into a restaurant. Two years later, he sold the ferry to a restaurateur.
