= Michael Lapage =

English rower and Christian missionary (1923–2018)

Personal information
- Nationality: British (English)
- Born: 15 November 1923 Shaftesbury, England
- Died: 20 July 2018 (aged 94)
- Height: 6 ft (183 cm) (1948)
- Weight: 13 st (182 lb; 83 kg) (1948)

Sport
- Sport: Rowing
- Club: Leander Club
Medal record
Men's rowing
Olympic Games
Representing Great Britain
| Silver medal – second place | 1948 London | Eight |
British Empire Games
Representing England
| Bronze medal – third place | 1950 Auckland | Eight |

Michael Clement Lapage (15 November 1923 – 20 July 2018) was an English missionary and rower who competed for Great Britain at the 1948 Summer Olympics.

== Biography ==
Lapage was born at Shaftesbury, Dorset, the son of Reginald H. Lapage, vicar of Shaftesbury, and his wife Dora Ehlvers. He was educated at Monkton Combe School where he was a contemporary of fellow Olympic rower Alfred Mellows. He gained a place to read geography at Selwyn College, Cambridge, but did not manage to make the university's rowing team as World War II intervened. Lapage saw service as a Fleet Air Arm pilot in the Pacific during the war. Coming close to being shot down had a lasting impact on him.

After the war Lapage was back at the University of Cambridge and was a member of the winning university's boat in the 1948 Boat Race. Most of that crew then won the silver medal rowing at the 1948 Summer Olympics in the men's eight at the 1948 London Olympics. The English athletes were still on rations at the time and Lapage believed that the winning Americans, who had ready access to meat, were at an advantage.

He represented the English team at the 1950 British Empire Games in Auckland, New Zealand, where he won the bronze medal in the eights event.

In the late 1950s, Lapage became a Christian missionary due to his upbringing and his near death experience during the war. He was ordained in Kenya in 1961. On 19 May 2012 he carried the Olympic torch in the relay for the 2012 Olympic Games, in St Austell, Cornwall.

Lapage died on 20 July 2018.

== See also ==
- List of Cambridge University Boat Race crews
- Rowing at the 1948 Summer Olympics
