= Enrico Ruberti =

Italian rower

Personal information
- Born: 10 October 1914
- Died: 6 August 1985 (aged 70)

Sport
- Sport: Rowing
Medal record
Men's rowing
Representing Italy
European Rowing Championships
Gold medal – first place	1947 Lucerne	Eight
Gold medal – first place	1949 Amsterdam	Eight

Enrico Ruberti (10 October 1914 – 6 August 1985) was an Italian rower. He competed at the 1948 Summer Olympics in London with the men's eight where they were eliminated in the semi-final.
