= Enrique Lingenfelder =

Argentine rower (1928–2020)

Personal information
- Born: 11 May 1928; Rosario, Argentina
- Died: 2 December 2020 (aged 92)

Sport
- Sport: Rowing

Enrique Luis Ricardo Lingenfelder (11 May 1928 – 2 December 2020) was an Argentine rower. He competed in the men's eight event at the 1948 Summer Olympics. He was one of four children and resided in Oberá, Misiones later in life.
