= Luis Pechenino =

Argentine rower

Personal information
- Born: 2 December 1925; Rosario, Santa Fe, Argentina
- Died: 18 June 2010 (aged 84)

Sport
- Sport: Rowing

Luis Pechenino (2 December 1925 – 18 June 2010) was an Argentine rower. He competed in the men's eight event at the 1948 Summer Olympics.
