= Luigi Gandini =

Italian rower

Personal information
- Born: 9 July 1928
- Died: 20 March 1987 (aged 58)

Sport
- Sport: Rowing
Medal record
Men's rowing
Representing Italy
European Rowing Championships
Gold medal – first place	1947 Lucerne	Eight
Gold medal – first place	1949 Amsterdam	Eight
Gold medal – first place	1950 Milan	Eight

Luigi Gandini (9 July 1928 – 20 March 1987) was an Italian rower. He competed at the 1948 Summer Olympics in London with the men's eight where they were eliminated in the semi-final.
