= Hansjakob Keller =

Swiss rower (1921–2007/2008)

Personal information
- Born: 18 September 1921
- Died: 2007 or 2008

Sport
- Sport: Rowing
Medal record
Men's rowing
Representing Switzerland
European Rowing Championships
Bronze medal – third place	1947 Lucerne	Single scull
Bronze medal – third place	1949 Amsterdam	Single scull

Hansjakob Keller (also Hans Jakob Keller, 18 September 1921 – 2007 or 2008) was a Swiss rower. He competed at the 1947 European Rowing Championships in Lucerne where he won a bronze medal in the single scull boat class. He went to the 1948 Summer Olympics and was eliminated in the round one repêchage in single scull. He won another European bronze medal in single scull in 1949. In later life, he was vice-president of the Swiss Rowing Federation. He died in circa 2008. Keller died in 2007 or 2008.
