= Franz Starkl =

Swiss rower (1924–1991)

Personal information
- Nationality: Swiss
- Born: 7 July 1924
- Died: 15 December 1991 (aged 67) Lucerne, Switzerland

Sport
- Sport: Rowing

Franz Starkl (7 July 1924 – 15 December 1991) was a Swiss rower. He competed in the men's eight event at the 1948 Summer Olympics. Starkl died in Lucerne on 15 December 1991, at the age of 67.
