= Mario Ciocco =

Swiss sports shooter

Personal information
- Born: 1907
- Died: 24 July 1967 (aged 59–60)

Sport
- Sport: Sports shooting

Mario Ciocco (1907 – 24 July 1967) was a Swiss sports shooter. He competed in the 300 m rifle and the 50 m rifle events at the 1948 Summer Olympics.
