= Albino Simões Neto =

Portuguese rower (1923–1997)

Personal information
- Nationality: Portuguese
- Born: 29 July 1923 Vera Cruz, Aveiro, Portugal
- Died: 5 April 1997 (aged 73) Glória e Vera Cruz, Portugal

Sport
- Sport: Rowing

Albino Simões Neto (29 July 1923 – 5 April 1997) was a Portuguese rower. He competed at the 1948 Summer Olympics and the 1952 Summer Olympics. Neto died in Glória e Vera Cruz on 5 April 1997, at the age of 73.
