= Robin Tamplin =

Irish rower (1928–2017)

Personal information
- Full name: Robert W. R. Tamplin
- Nationality: Irish
- Born: 1928 Mountmellick, Ireland
- Died: 13 February 2017 (aged 88–89) County Wicklow, Ireland

Sport
- Sport: Rowing

Robert W. R. Tamplin (1928 – 13 February 2017) was an Irish rower. He competed in the men's eight event at the 1948 Summer Olympics.
