= Moritz Grand =

Swiss rower (1923–2009)

Personal information
- Nationality: Swiss
- Born: 4 December 1923
- Died: 2009 (aged 85–86)

Sport
- Sport: Rowing

Moritz Grand (4 December 1923 – 2009) was a Swiss rower. He competed in the men's eight event at the 1948 Summer Olympics. Grand died in 2009.
