= Luís Machado (rower) =

Portuguese rower (1925–2000)

Personal information
- Full name: Luís da Naia Machado
- Nationality: Portuguese
- Born: 3 December 1925 Vera Cruz, Aveiro, Portugal
- Died: 14 July 2000 (aged 74) Glória e Vera Cruz, Portugal

Sport
- Sport: Rowing

Luís da Naia Machado (3 December 1925 – 14 July 2000) was a Portuguese professional rower who competed in the men's eight event at the 1948 Summer Olympics. Machado died in Glória e Vera Cruz on 14 July 2000, at the age of 74.
