= Ivan Telesmanić =

Croatian rower

Personal information
- Nationality: Croatian
- Born: 18 January 1920; Silba, Yugoslavia
- Died: 25 June 2001 (aged 81); Zagreb, Croatia

Sport
- Sport: Rowing

Ivan Telesmanić (18 January 1920 – 25 June 2001) was a Croatian rower. He competed in the men's eight event at the 1948 Summer Olympics.
