= Christopher Barton =

Irish and British rower

Olympic medal record

Representing Great Britain

Men's rowing
Silver medal – second place	1948 London	Eight

Christopher "Chris" Bertram Ronald Barton (21 November 1927 – 18 August 2013) was an Irish rower who competed in the 1948 Summer Olympics for Great Britain.

Barton was born at Celbridge, Kildare, Ireland, the son of Captain Frederick Bertram Barton and Joan Aileen Lecky. He was educated at St Columba's College, Dublin and Jesus College, Cambridge. In 1948, he was a member of the victorious Cambridge crew in the Boat Race. Most of the Cambridge crew of 1948 also rowed for Leander Club at Henley Royal Regatta. The Leander eight were selected to row for Great Britain in the 1948 Summer Olympics and won the silver medal.

== See also ==
- List of Cambridge University Boat Race crews
- Rowing at the 1948 Summer Olympics
