= Jack Zwirewich =

Canadian rower (1929– 1989)

John Michael "Jack" Zwirewich
Personal information
- Nationality: Canadian
- Born: 11 February 1929
- Died: 15 September 1989 (aged 60) Ottawa, Ontario, Canada

Sport
- Sport: Rowing

Jack Zwirewich (11 February 1929 – 15 September 1989) was a Canadian rower. He competed at the 1948 Summer Olympics and the 1952 Summer Olympics.
