= Sveto Drenovac =

Croatian rower

Personal information
- Nationality: Croatian
- Died: before 2017

Sport
- Sport: Rowing

Sveto Drenovac (died before 2017) was a Croatian rower. He competed in the men's eight event at the 1948 Summer Olympics.
