= Art Griffiths =

Canadian rower (1924–2018)

Art Griffiths (9 September 1924 – 11 August 2018) was a Canadian rower who competed in the 1948 Summer Olympics and in the 1952 Summer Olympics.

== Biography ==
Griffiths went to the Westdale Secondary School in 1940 and graduated in 1943. Griffiths started rowing in 1940 at Westdale. During World War II, he became a pilot for the Royal Canadian Air Force until 1946. After the war, Griffiths resumed his rowing career for the Leander Boat Club. As a member of Leander, he rowed at the 1948 and 1952 Summer Olympics for Canada. Griffiths retired from rowing in 1954.
