= Moysés Cardoso =

Portuguese sports shooter

Moisés Cardoso
Personal information
- Born: 2 October 1900

Sport
- Sport: Sports shooting

Moisés Cardoso (born 2 October 1900, date of death unknown) was a Portuguese sports shooter. He competed at the 1936 Summer Olympics and 1948 Summer Olympics.
