= James Hardy (rower) =

American rower (1923–1986)

Medal record

Men's rowing

Representing the United States

Olympic Games
Gold medal – first place	1948 London	Men's eight

James Hardy (January 15, 1923 – September 20, 1986) was an American competition rower, born in San Francisco, and Olympic champion, and later traffic engineer. He won a gold medal in the men's eight at the 1948 Summer Olympics, as a member of the American team.
