= Ernst Strupler =

Swiss diver

Personal information
- Nationality: Swiss
- Born: 3 August 1918 Zürich, Switzerland
- Died: 23 May 2014 (aged 95) Kirchlindach, Switzerland

Sport
- Sport: Diving

Ernst Strupler (3 August 1918 – 23 May 2014) was a Swiss diver. He competed in two events at the 1948 Summer Olympics.
