= Jack Dearlove =

English rowing cox

Personal information
- Nationality: British (English)
- Born: 5 June 1911 Fulham, London, England
- Died: 11 July 1967 (aged 56) Bromley, England

Sport
- Sport: Rowing
- Event: coxswain
- Club: Thames Rowing Club
Medal record
Men's rowing
Olympic Games
Representing Great Britain
Silver medal – second place	1948 London	Eight
British Empire Games
Representing England
Bronze medal – third place	1950 Auckland	Eight

Jack Gilroy Dearlove (5 June 1911 – 11 July 1967) was an English rower who competed as coxswain for Great Britain in the 1948 Summer Olympics.

== Early life ==
Educated at Lynton House school in Holland Park, West London, he suffered severe injuries in a road accident aged 13 which resulted in his right leg being amputated.

== Sporting career ==
At the 1948 Summer Olympics in England he was the coxswain of the British boat which won the silver medal in the Eights.

He represented the English team at the 1950 British Empire Games in Auckland, New Zealand, where he won the bronze medal in the eights event.

== Personal life ==
His son Richard Dearlove went into the British Civil Service, becoming the British Government's Chief of the Secret Intelligence Service, and later Master of Pembroke College, Cambridge.
