= Mario Acchini =

Italian rower (1915–1991)

Personal information
- Nationality: Italian
- Born: 3 May 1915 Varese, Italy
- Died: 24 April 1991 (aged 75) Varese, Italy
- Relatives: Ezio Acchini (cousin)

Sport
- Sport: Rowing
Medal record
Men's rowing
Representing Italy
European Rowing Championships
Gold medal – first place	1947 Lucerne	Eight
Gold medal – first place	1949 Amsterdam	Eight

Mario Acchini (3 May 1915 – 24 April 1991) was an Italian rower. He competed in the 1948 Summer Olympics. Ezio Acchini was his cousin.
