= Alma Butia =

Slovenian sprinter (1929–2019)

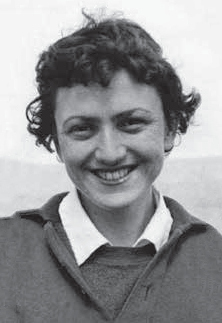
- Alma Butia, circa 1940s

Personal information
- Born: 9 February 1929 Teharje, Kingdom of Serbs, Croats, and Slovenes
- Died: 20 February 2019 (aged 90) Zagreb, Croatia

Sport
- Sport: Athletics
- Event: Sprint
- Club: AD Kladivar, Celje

Achievements and titles
- Personal best(s): 100 m – 12.4 (1953); 200 m – 26.1 (1953)

Alma Butia-Car (9 February 1929 – 20 February 2019) was a Slovenian Olympic sprinter. She competed in the 100 m and 200 m events at the 1948 Summer Olympics, but failed to reach the finals. At the then-unofficial survey of the National Sports, she was considered the reader's choice of "the best athlete of Yugoslavia" in 1947. Butia died on 20 February 2019 at the age of 90. At the time of her death, she was reportedly the last Croatian athlete who participated in the 1948 London Olympic games.
