= Ian Turner (rower) =

American rower (1925–2010)

Medal record

Men's rowing

Representing the United States

Olympic Games
Gold medal – first place	1948 London	Eight

Ian Gordon Turner (May 11, 1925 – October 11, 2010) was an American competition rower and Olympic champion. He won a gold medal in the men's eight at the 1948 Summer Olympics, as a member of the American team. His brother David Turner was on the same Olympic team. Turner was born in Oakland, California and died there in 2010.
