= Lloyd Butler (rower) =

American rower (1924–1991)

Personal information
- Nationality: American
- Born: Lloyd LeMarr Butler; November 11, 1924
- Died: May 19, 1991 (aged 66)
Medal record
Men's athletics
Representing the United States
Olympic Games
Men's rowing
Gold medal – first place	1948 London	Eight

Lloyd Butler (November 11, 1924 – May 19, 1991) was an American rower, born in Sparks, Nevada, who competed at the 1948 Summer Olympics. He won the gold medal with the American team in the men's eight. Butler attended the University of California, Berkeley, graduating in 1950. While a member of the eight, he won the 1949 IRA Regatta, and finished second to Washington in that race in both 1948 and 1950.
