= Janko Puhar =

Personal information
- Born: 1 April 1920
- Died: 27 May 1985 (aged 65)

Sport
- Sport: Swimming

Janko Puhar (1 April 1920 – 27 May 1985) was a Yugoslav swimmer. He competed in three events at the 1948 Summer Olympics.
