= Otto Burri =

Swiss rower

Personal information
- Nationality: Swiss
- Born: 9 January 1928; Switzerland
- Died: 25 January 2014 (aged 86); Bloemfontein, South Africa

Sport
- Sport: Rowing

Otto Burri (9 January 1928 – 25 January 2014) was a Swiss rower. He competed in the men's eight event at the 1948 Summer Olympics.
