= Mile Petrović =

Croatian rower (1915–1990)

Miodrag "Mile" Petrović
Personal information
- Nationality: Croatian
- Born: 1915 Valjevo, Kingdom of Serbia
- Died: 1990 (aged 74–75) Belgrade, Yugoslavia

Sport
- Sport: Rowing

Miodrag "Mile" Petrović (1915–1990) was a Croatian rower. He competed in the men's eight event at the 1948 Summer Olympics.
