= Ezio Acchini =

Italian rower (1922–1985)

Personal information
- Nationality: Italian
- Born: 2 January 1922 Nonsard-Lamarche, France
- Died: 17 January 1985 (aged 63) Varese, Italy
- Relatives: Mario Acchini (cousin)

Sport
- Sport: Rowing
Medal record
Men's rowing
Representing Italy
European Rowing Championships
Gold medal – first place	1947 Lucerne	Eight
Gold medal – first place	1949 Amsterdam	Eight

Ezio Acchini (2 January 1922 – 17 January 1985) was an Italian rower. He competed in the 1948 Summer Olympics. Mario Acchini was his cousin.
