= Fredy Schultheiss =

Swiss rower (1926–2006)

Personal information
- Full name: Alfred Schultheiss
- Nationality: Swiss
- Born: 14 April 1926 St. Gallen, Switzerland
- Died: 19 August 2006 (aged 80) Cayman Brac, Cayman Islands

Sport
- Sport: Rowing

Alfred Schultheiss (14 April 1926 – 19 August 2006) was a Swiss rower. He competed in the men's eight event at the 1948 Summer Olympics. Schultheiss died in Cayman Brac, Cayman Islands on 19 August 2006, at the age of 80.
