= Bogdan Sirotanović =

Croatian rower

Personal information
- Nationality: Croatian
- Born: 5 November 1915
- Died: 28 April 1998 (aged 82)

Sport
- Sport: Rowing

Bogdan Sirotanović (5 November 1915 – 28 April 1998) was a Croatian rower. He competed in the men's eight event at the 1948 Summer Olympics.
