= Alfred Mellows =

English rower (1922–1997)

Medal record

Men's rowing

Representing Great Britain

Olympic Games
Silver medal – second place	1948 London	Eight

Alfred Paul Mellows DFC (8 June 1922 – 11 July 1997) was an English rower who competed for Great Britain in the 1948 Summer Olympics.

Mellows was born in Croydon, the son of Alfred John Mellows and his wife Edith Dean. He was educated at Monkton Combe School and at Cambridge University, and was a contemporary of fellow Olympic rower Michael Lapage at both places. He was bowman in the winning Cambridge boat in the 1947 Boat Race and took the same position with the record-breaking Cambridge crew in the 1948 race. In 1948, he was a crew member of the British boat which won the silver medal rowing at the 1948 Summer Olympics in the men's eights.

Wartime service : Pilot Officer "Paul" Mellows served with the RAF during WW II as a night fighter pilot flying De Havilland Mosquitos accompanying planes from Bomber Command on 50 operations over mainland Europe. His DFC was awarded following a raid over Stuttgart, during which his plane sustained critical damage as a result of AAA fire, which almost completely destroyed the aircraft's tailplane. Despite the damage incurred which made manoeuvring the aircraft extremely difficult if not almost impossible, PO Mellows managed to limp the damaged aircraft and his navigator crewman across occupied territory and back to base in England, and for valour and the superb flying skill demonstrated that night, was awarded the Distinguished Flying Cross.

Mellows died at Addlestone, Surrey at the age of 75.

His Widow Jean Mellows survives him.

== See also ==
- List of Cambridge University Boat Race crews
