= Walt Robertson =

Canadian rower

Personal information
- Nationality: Canadian
- Born: November 12, 1925 Glasgow, Scotland
- Died: September 5, 2014 (aged 88) Hamilton, Ontario, Canada

Sport
- Sport: Rowing

Walt Robertson (November 12, 1925 – September 5, 2014) was a Canadian rower. He competed in the men's eight event at the 1948 Summer Olympics.
