= Eugen Vollmar =

Swiss rower

Personal information
- Nationality: Swiss
- Born: 31 January 1928
- Died: 19 January 2016 (aged 87); Wasterkingen, Switzerland

Sport
- Sport: Rowing

Eugen Vollmar (31 January 1928 – 19 January 2016) was a Swiss rower. He competed in the men's eight event at the 1948 Summer Olympics.
