= Guy Richardson =

British rower

Olympic medal record

Men's rowing
Silver medal – second place	1948 London	Eight

Guy Colquhoun Richardson (8 September 1921 – 27 October 1965) was a British rower who competed in the 1948 Summer Olympics.

Richardson was born at Guildford, Surrey; he was the son of Alexander Richardson, a British general and 1928 Olympic medalist, and his wife Agnes Thackeray. He attended Cambridge University and in 1947 and 1948, he was a member of the victorious Cambridge crews in the Boat Races. Most of the Cambridge crew of 1948 also rowed for Leander Club at Henley Royal Regatta. The Leander eight were selected to row for Great Britain in the 1948 Summer Olympics and won the silver medal. Richardson died on 27 October 1965 when the BEA Vickers Vanguard he was travelling on crashed at Heathrow Airport.

== See also ==
- List of Cambridge University Boat Race crews
- Rowing at the 1948 Summer Olympics
