= David Turner (rower) =

American rower

Medal record

Men's rowing

Representing the United States

Olympic Games
Gold medal – first place	1948 London	Eight

David Lindsay "Dave" Turner (September 23, 1923 – June 26, 2015) was an American competition rower and Olympic champion, naval aviator in World War II, Korean War and Vietnam War and later hurricane hunter for the US Navy and NOAA. Born in Oakland, California, he won a gold medal in the men's eight at the 1948 Summer Olympics, as a member of the American team. His brother Ian was on the same Olympic team.
