= Roger Lebranchu =

French rower (1922–2025)

Personal information
- Full name: Roger René Lebranchu
- Nationality: French
- Born: 22 July 1922 Neuilly-sur-Seine, France
- Died: 10 January 2025 (aged 102) Coutances, France

Sport
- Sport: Rowing

Roger René Lebranchu (22 July 1922 – 10 January 2025) was a French rower. He competed in the men's eight event at the 1948 Summer Olympics. During World War II, Lebranchu was imprisoned as member of the French Resistance for two years in two concentration camps before escaping.

Lebranchu died on 10 January 2025 in Coutances, at the age of 102.
