= Carlos da Benta =

Portuguese rower (1927–2002)

Personal information
- Full name: Carlos do Roque da Benta
- Nationality: Portuguese
- Born: 10 November 1927 Vera Cruz, Aveiro, Portugal
- Died: 1 April 2002 (aged 74) Santo António dos Olivais, Portugal

Sport
- Sport: Rowing

Carlos do Roque da Benta (10 November 1927 – 1 April 2002) was a Portuguese rower. He competed at the 1948 Summer Olympics and the 1952 Summer Olympics. Da Benta died in Santo António dos Olivais on 1 April 2002, at the age of 74.
