= Peter Gübeli =

Swiss rower

Personal information
- Nationality: Swiss
- Born: 12 August 1925; Zürich, Switzerland
- Died: 2 December 2014 (aged 89)

Sport
- Sport: Rowing

Peter Gübeli (12 August 1925 – 2 December 2014) was a Swiss rower. He competed in the men's eight event at the 1948 Summer Olympics.
