= John Stack (rower) =

American rower and x-ray engineer

Medal record

Men's rowing

Representing the United States

Olympic Games
Gold medal – first place	1948 London	Eight

John Stack (22 March 1924 – 28 May 1997) was an American x-ray engineer, competition rower and Olympic champion, born in Camden, New Jersey. He won a gold medal in the men's eight at the 1948 Summer Olympics with the American team.
