= João de Sousa (rower) =

Portuguese rower

Personal information
- Nationality: Portuguese
- Born: 11 July 1924
- Died: 7 December 2014 (aged 90)

Sport
- Sport: Rowing

João de Sousa (11 July 1924 – 7 December 2014) was a Portuguese rower. He competed in the men's eight event at the 1948 Summer Olympics.
