= João Alberto Lemos =

Portuguese rower (1928–1984)

Personal information
- Full name: João Alberto Martins da Naia Lemos
- Nationality: Portuguese
- Born: 21 January 1928 Vera Cruz, Aveiro, Portugal
- Died: 7 October 1984 (aged 56) Glória e Vera Cruz, Portugal

Sport
- Sport: Rowing

João Alberto Martins da Naia Lemos (21 January 1928 – 7 October 1984) was a Portuguese rower. He competed at the 1948 Summer Olympics and the 1952 Summer Olympics. Lemos died in Glória e Vera Cruz on 7 October 1984, at the age of 56.
