= George Ahlgren =

American rower (1928–1951)

Medal record

Men's rowing

Representing the United States

Olympic Games
Gold medal – first place	1948 London	Eight

George Lewis Ahlgren (August 16, 1928 – December 30, 1951) was an American rower who competed at the 1948 Summer Olympics. He won the gold medal with the American team in the men's eight. He attended University of California, Berkeley.

Ahlgren was killed in an aircraft crash in Arizona while serving in the U.S. Air Force.
