= Branko Becić =

Croatian rower

Personal information
- Nationality: Croatian
- Born: 14 December 1923; Sarajevo, Yugoslavia
- Died: 18 September 2000 (aged 76); Zagreb, Croatia

Sport
- Sport: Rowing

Branko Becić (14 December 1923 – 18 September 2000) was a Croatian rower. He competed in the men's eight event at the 1948 Summer Olympics.
