= Justus Smith =

American rower (1922–2013)

Medal record

Men's rowing

Representing the United States

Olympic Games
Gold medal – first place	1948 London	Eight

Justus Ketchum Smith (March 28, 1922 – November 20, 2013) was an American rower, born in Spokane, who competed at the 1948 Summer Olympics. He won the gold medal with the American team in the men's eight.
