= Paddy Harold =

Irish rower

Personal information
- Nationality: Irish
- Born: 23 January 1923; Dublin, Ireland
- Died: 20 May 1988 (aged 65); Dublin, Ireland

Sport
- Sport: Rowing

Patrick Desmond R. Harrold (23 January 1923 – 20 May 1988) was an Irish rower. He competed in the men's eight event at the 1948 Summer Olympics.
