= Gustaf Nielsen =

Danish sports shooter (1910–1973)

Personal information
- Born: 21 April 1910 Frederikshavn, Denmark
- Died: 25 June 1973 (aged 63) Dyssegård, Denmark

Sport
- Sport: Sports shooting

Gustaf Nielsen (21 April 1910 – 25 June 1973) was a Danish sports shooter. He competed in two events at the 1948 Summer Olympics.
