= Ron Cameron (rower) =

Canadian rower

Personal information
- Nationality: Canadian
- Born: 12 December 1923
- Died: 13 May 2009 (aged 85); Bracebridge, Ontario, Canada

Sport
- Sport: Rowing

Ron Cameron (12 December 1923 – 13 May 2009) was a Canadian rower. He competed at the 1948 Summer Olympics and the 1952 Summer Olympics.
