= David Brown (rower, born 1928) =

American rower and physician

Medal record

Men's rowing

Representing the United States

Olympic Games
Gold medal – first place	1948 London	Eight

David Brown (16 May 1928 – 14 August 2004) was an American competition rower and Olympic champion, and later physician. He won a gold medal in the men's eight at the 1948 Summer Olympics, as a member of the American team.
