= Ralph Purchase =

American rower (1916–2000)

Medal record

Men's rowing

Representing the United States

Olympic Games
Gold medal – first place	1948 London	Eight

Ralph Purchase (11 July 1916 – 11 January 2000) was an American competition rower and Olympic champion. He won a gold medal in the men's eight at the 1948 Summer Olympics, as the coxswain for the American team.
