= Sreta Novičić =

Croatian rower

Personal information
- Nationality: Croatian
- Died: before 2010

Sport
- Sport: Rowing

Sreta Novičić (died before 2010) was a Croatian rower. He competed in the men's eight event at the 1948 Summer Olympics.
