= José Machado (rower) =

Portuguese rower (1927–2004)

Personal information
- Full name: José da Naia Machado
- Nationality: Portuguese
- Born: 1 May 1927 Vera Cruz, Aveiro, Portugal
- Died: 4 March 2004 (aged 76) Santo António dos Olivais, Portugal

Sport
- Sport: Rowing

José da Naia Machado (1 May 1927 – 4 March 2004) was a Portuguese rower. He competed in the men's eight event at the 1948 Summer Olympics. Machado died in Santo António dos Olivais on 4 March 2004, at the age of 76.
