= Hans Schultheiss =

Swiss rower

Hans Schultheiss (11 June 1921 – 23 February 2013) was a Swiss rower who competed in the 1948 Summer Olympics. He died in February 2013 at the age of 91.
