= Poul Korup =

Danish rower

Personal information
- Born: 28 January 1926 Copenhagen, Denmark
- Died: 5 September 2003 (aged 77)

Sport
- Sport: Rowing
Medal record
Men's rowing
Representing Denmark
European Rowing Championships
Silver medal – second place	1947 Lucerne	Eight

Poul Jøhrens Korup (28 January 1926 – 5 September 2003) was a Danish rower. He competed at the 1948 Summer Olympics in London with the men's eight where they were eliminated in the round one repêchage.
