= Karel Vaněk =

Czech chess player

Personal information
- Born: 19 May 1895
- Died: 24 February 1958 (aged 62)

Chess career
- Country: Czechoslovakia

Karel Vaněk (19 May 1895 – 24 February 1958), was a Czech chess player, unofficial Chess Olympiad team gold medal winner (1924).

== Biography ==
In the first half of the 1920s Karel Vaněk was one of Czechoslovakia's leading chess players. He has lived in Brno and participated in team tournaments with the local chess club. In 1923, in Pardubice Karel Vaněk won a bronze medal in Czechoslovak Chess Championship. In 1924, in Paris Karel Vaněk represented the Czechoslovakia team in 1st unofficial Chess Olympiad, where he won a gold medal in team competition.
