= Ib Nielsen (rower) =

Danish rower (1926–2014)

Personal information
- Born: 4 February 1926 Faxe, Denmark
- Died: 25 July 2014 (aged 88)

Sport
- Sport: Rowing
Medal record
Men's rowing
Representing Denmark
European Rowing Championships
Silver medal – second place	1947 Lucerne	Eight
Silver medal – second place	1950 Milan	Coxless four

Ib Nielsen (4 February 1926 – 25 July 2014) was a Danish rower. He competed at the 1948 Summer Olympics in London with the men's eight where they were eliminated in the round one repêchage. Nielsen died on 25 July 2014, at the age of 88.
