= Kristoffer Lepsøe =

Norwegian rower (1922–2006)

Personal information
- Born: 15 March 1922 Fana, Norway
- Died: 26 March 2006 (aged 84) Hagali, Bergen, Norway

Sport
- Sport: Rowing
- Club: Fana Roklubb
Medal record
Representing Norway
Men's rowing
Olympic Games
Bronze medal – third place	1948 London	Eight
European Rowing Championships
Bronze medal – third place	1949 Amsterdam	Coxless four

Kristoffer Lepsøe (15 March 1922 – 26 March 2006) was a Norwegian competition rower and Olympic medalist. He received a bronze medal in the men's eight at the 1948 Summer Olympics, as a member of the Norwegian team.

Lepsøe received a bronze medal in coxless four at the 1949 European championships. He competed in the coxless four at the 1952 Summer Olympics.
