= Helge Halkjær =

Danish rower

Olympic medal record

Men's rowing

Representing Denmark

Olympic Games
Silver medal – second place	1948 London	Coxless four

Helge Halkjær (20 December 1916 – 14 February 1996) was a Danish rower who competed in the 1948 Summer Olympics.

He was born in Thorning, Region Midtjylland and died in Kolding. In 1948 he was a crew member of the Danish boat which won the silver medal in the coxless four event.
