= Halfdan Gran Olsen =

Norwegian rower

Medal record

Representing Norway

Men's rowing

Olympic Games
| Bronze medal – third place | 1948 London | Eight |

Halfdan Gran Olsen (7 October 1910 – 16 January 1971) was a Norwegian competition rower and Olympic medalist. He received a bronze medal in men's eight at the 1948 Summer Olympics, as a member of the Norwegian team.
