= Holger Larsen =

Danish rower (1925–2014)

Personal information
- Born: 29 May 1925 Roskilde, Denmark
- Died: 7 December 2014 (aged 89)

Sport
- Sport: Rowing
Medal record
Men's rowing
Representing Denmark
European Rowing Championships
Silver medal – second place	1947 Lucerne	Eight
Silver medal – second place	1950 Milan	Coxless four

Kaj Holger Larsen (29 May 1925 – 7 December 2014) was a Danish rower. He competed at the 1948 Summer Olympics in London with the men's eight where they were eliminated in the round one repêchage.
