= Ib Storm Larsen =

Danish rower (1925–1991)

Olympic medal record

Men's rowing
Silver medal – second place	1948 London	Coxless four

Ib Storm Larsen (later Storm, 28 September 1925 – 4 January 1991) was a Danish rower who competed in the 1948 Summer Olympics.

He was born in Faaborg and died in the Algarve, Portugal.

In 1948 he was a crew member of the Danish boat which won the silver medal in the coxless fours event.
