= Niels Wamberg =

Danish rower

Personal information
- Born: 31 July 1920 Copenhagen, Denmark
- Died: 28 May 2016 (aged 95)

Sport
- Sport: Rowing
Medal record
Men's rowing
Representing Denmark
European Rowing Championships
| Silver medal – second place | 1947 Lucerne | Eight |

Niels Alfred Wamberg (31 July 1920 – 28 May 2016) was a Danish coxswain. He competed at the 1948 Summer Olympics in London with the men's eight where they were eliminated in the round one repêchage.
