= Denis Sugrue =

Irish rower

Personal information
- Full name: Denis Lambert Sugrue
- Nationality: Irish
- Born: 11 March 1927 Dublin, Ireland
- Died: 23 July 2014 (aged 87) Stoke-on-Trent, England

Sport
- Sport: Rowing

Achievements and titles
- Olympic finals: Men's eight, 1948

Denis Sugrue (11 March 1927 – 23 July 2014) was an Irish rower. He competed in the men's eight event at the 1948 Summer Olympics.
