= Morgan McElligott =

Irish rower (1925–2016)

Personal information
- Nationality: Irish
- Born: 21 June 1925 Rathdown, Dublin, Ireland
- Died: 16 February 2016 (aged 90) Coosan, Ireland

Sport
- Sport: Rowing

Morgan McElligott (21 June 1925 – 16 February 2016) was an Irish rower and cardiologist. He competed in the men's eight event at the 1948 Summer Olympics.

== Biography ==
McElligott was born in Rathdown, Dublin in 1925. He gained a medical degree while studying at the University College Dublin. In 1948, he was part of the team that won the All-Ireland Senior Rowing Championship. At the 1948 Summer Olympics in London, McElligott was part of the Irish team that competed in the men's eight.

Two years after the Olympics, he started his medical career in Dublin, and moved to London three years after that. After six years later, McElligott returned to Ireland, becoming a consultant at Portiuncula Hospital. He spent more than three decades working at the hospital, where he worked in cardiology and helped to found the very first cardiac care unit in Portiuncula.

In 1989, McElligott left Portiuncula and went to Baghdad with his wife, with both of them developing the Ibn Al-Bitar Hospital. Due to the first Gulf War, they both left Iraq, moving to Tabuk, Saudi Arabia. In Saudi Arabia he was the chief of internal medicine for the Royal College of Surgeons. After nearly two years in Saudi Arabia, he retired and returned to Ireland with his wife.

In 2012, McElligott was one of the eleven surviving members of Ireland's 1948 Summer Olympics team, who were all honoured at a ceremony in Dublin.
