= Sigurd Monssen =

Norwegian rower (1902–1990)

Medal record

Representing Norway

Men's rowing

Olympic Games
Bronze medal – third place	1948 London	Eight

Sigurd Synnestvedt Monssen (10 October 1902 – 7 November 1990) was a Norwegian rowing coxswain and Olympic medalist. He received a bronze medal in men's eight at the 1948 Summer Olympics, as a member of the Norwegian team.
