= Leif Næss =

Norwegian rower (1923–1973)

Medal record

Men's rowing

Representing Norway

Olympic Games
Bronze medal – third place	1948 London	Eight

Leif Trygve Næss (29 January 1923 – 10 June 1973) was a Norwegian competition rower and Olympic medalist. He received a bronze medal in men's eight at the 1948 Summer Olympics, as a member of the Norwegian team.
