= Thor Pedersen (rower) =

Norwegian rower

Medal record

Representing Norway

Men's rowing

Olympic Games
Bronze medal – third place	1948 London	Eight

Thor Inge Oluf Pedersen (31 August 1924 – 15 August 2008) was a Norwegian competition rower and Olympic medalist. He received a bronze medal in men's eight at the 1948 Summer Olympics, as a member of the Norwegian team.
