= Carl Monssen =

Norwegian rower (1921–1992)

Personal information
- Born: Carl Henrik Monssen; 13 July 1921
- Died: 25 February 1992 (aged 70)

Sport
- Sport: Rowing
Medal record
Men's rowing
Representing Norway
Olympic Games
Bronze medal – third place	1948 London	Eight
European Rowing Championships
Bronze medal – third place	1949 Amsterdam	Coxless four
Silver medal – second place	1953 Copenhagen	Coxless four

Carl Henrik Monssen (13 July 1921 – 25 February 1992) was a Norwegian competition rower and Olympic medalist. He received a bronze medal in the men's eight at the 1948 Summer Olympics, as a member of the Norwegian team.

Monssen received a bronze and a silver medal in the coxless four events at the 1949 and 1953 European Championships, respectively.
