= Felisberto Fortes =

Portuguese rower

Personal information
- Nationality: Portuguese
- Born: 13 December 1927
- Died: 21 September 2013 (aged 85)

Sport
- Sport: Rowing

Felisberto Fortes (13 December 1927 – 21 September 2013) was a Portuguese rower. He competed at the 1948 Summer Olympics and the 1952 Summer Olympics.
