= Tage Henriksen =

Danish rower (1925 – 2016)

Personal information
- Born: 8 April 1925 Roskilde
- Died: 13 May 2016 (aged 91)

Sport
- Sport: Rowing
Medal record
Men's rowing
Representing Denmark
Olympic Games
Gold medal – first place	1948 London	Coxed pair
European Rowing Championships
Bronze medal – third place	1947 Lucerne	Coxed pair

Tage Henriksen (8 April 1925 – 13 May 2016) was a Danish rower who competed in the 1948 Summer Olympics. He was born in Roskilde. In 1948 he was a crew member of the Danish boat which won the gold medal in the coxed pair event. He died in 2016.
