= Niels Rasmussen =

Danish rower

Personal information
- Born: 27 May 1922 Søndersø, Denmark
- Died: 12 January 1991 (aged 68)

Sport
- Sport: Rowing
Medal record
Men's rowing
Representing Denmark
European Rowing Championships
Silver medal – second place	1947 Lucerne	Eight

Niels Rasmussen (27 May 1922 – 12 January 1991) was a Danish rower. He competed at the 1948 Summer Olympics in London with the men's eight where they were eliminated in the round one repêchage.
