= Joe Hanly =

Irish rower

Personal information
- Nationality: Irish
- Born: 5 May 1925
- Died: 6 August 1996 (aged 71)

Sport
- Sport: Rowing

Joe Hanly (5 May 1925 – 6 August 1996) was an Irish rower. He competed in the men's eight event at the 1948 Summer Olympics. The Hanly Medal, awarded by the Old Collegians Boat Club, was named after him.
