= Paul Bircher =

English rower (1928–2019)

Olympic medal record

Men's rowing
Silver medal – second place	1948 London	Eight

Ernest Augustus Paul Bircher (11 December 1928 – 6 October 2019) was an English rower who competed for Great Britain in the 1948 Summer Olympics.

Bircher was born at Kensington, London. He was educated at Radley College and Christ's College, Cambridge and in 1948, he was a member of the victorious Cambridge crew in the Boat Race. Most of the Cambridge crew of 1948 also rowed for Leander Club at Henley Royal Regatta. The Leander eight were selected to row for Great Britain in the 1948 Summer Olympics and won the silver medal. Bircher was in the winning Cambridge crews in the 1949 and 1950 Boat Races. In 1953 he was a member of the Leander Club crew which won the Grand Challenge Cup at Henley Royal Regatta.

== See also ==
- List of Cambridge University Boat Race crews
