= Barry McDonnell =

Irish rower (1924–1976)

Personal information
- Full name: Brendan McDonnell
- Nationality: Irish
- Born: 1924 Virginia, County Cavan, Ireland
- Died: 14 February 1976 (aged 51–52) Dublin, Ireland

Sport
- Sport: Rowing

Brendan "Barry" McDonnell (1924 – 14 February 1976) was an Irish rower. He competed in the men's eight event at the 1948 Summer Olympics.
