= Jarl Emcken =

Danish rower

Personal information
- Born: 6 September 1920 Copenhagen, Denmark
- Died: 10 May 2000 (aged 79)

Sport
- Sport: Rowing
Medal record
Men's rowing
Representing Denmark
European Rowing Championships
Silver medal – second place	1947 Lucerne	Eight

Jarl Emcken (6 September 1920 – 10 May 2000) was a Danish rower. He competed at the 1948 Summer Olympics in London with the men's eight where they were eliminated in the round one repêchage.
