= Predrag Sarić =

Croatian rower

Personal information
- Nationality: Croatian
- Born: 24 June 1921; Velika, Kingdom of Serbs, Croats, and Slovenes
- Died: 16 October 1979 (aged 58); Paris, France

Sport
- Sport: Rowing

Predrag Sarić (24 June 1921 – 16 October 1979) was a Croatian rower. He competed in the men's coxed pair event at the 1948 Summer Olympics.
