= Tom Dowdall =

Irish rower (1926–2010)

Personal information
- Full name: Thomas Ian Gerard Dowdall
- Nationality: Irish
- Born: 1926 Dublin, Ireland
- Died: 11 October 2010 (aged 83–84) Stewartstown, County Tyrone, Northern Ireland

Sport
- Sport: Rowing

Thomas Ian Gerard Dowdall (1926 – 11 October 2010) was an Irish rower. He competed in the men's eight event at the 1948 Summer Olympics.
