= Gerhardt Sørensen =

Danish rower (1921–2002)

Personal information
- Born: 23 March 1921 Højby, Denmark
- Died: 18 July 2002 (aged 81)

Sport
- Sport: Rowing
Medal record
Men's rowing
Representing Denmark
European Rowing Championships
Silver medal – second place	1947 Lucerne	Eight

Jens Gerhardt Sørensen (23 March 1921 – 18 July 2002) was a Danish rower. He competed at the 1948 Summer Olympics in London with the men's eight where they were eliminated in the round one repêchage.
