= Charles Willumsen =

Danish rower

Personal information
- Born: 24 August 1918 Viborg, Denmark
- Died: 27 November 1984 (aged 66)

Sport
- Sport: Rowing
Medal record
Men's rowing
Representing Denmark
European Rowing Championships
| Silver medal – second place | 1947 Lucerne | Eight |

Charles Willumsen (24 August 1918 – 27 November 1984) was a Danish rower. He competed at the 1948 Summer Olympics in London with the men's eight where they were eliminated in the round one repêchage.
