= Paddy Dooley (rower) =

Irish rower

Personal information
- Nationality: Irish
- Born: 27 March 1926; Limerick, Ireland
- Died: 12 December 2008 (aged 82); Nenagh, Ireland

Sport
- Sport: Rowing

Patrick O. Dooley, known as Paddy Dooley (27 March 1926 – 12 December 2008) was an Irish rower. He competed in the men's eight event at the 1948 Summer Olympics.
