= Glória e Vera Cruz =

Civil parish in Portugal

- Civil parish
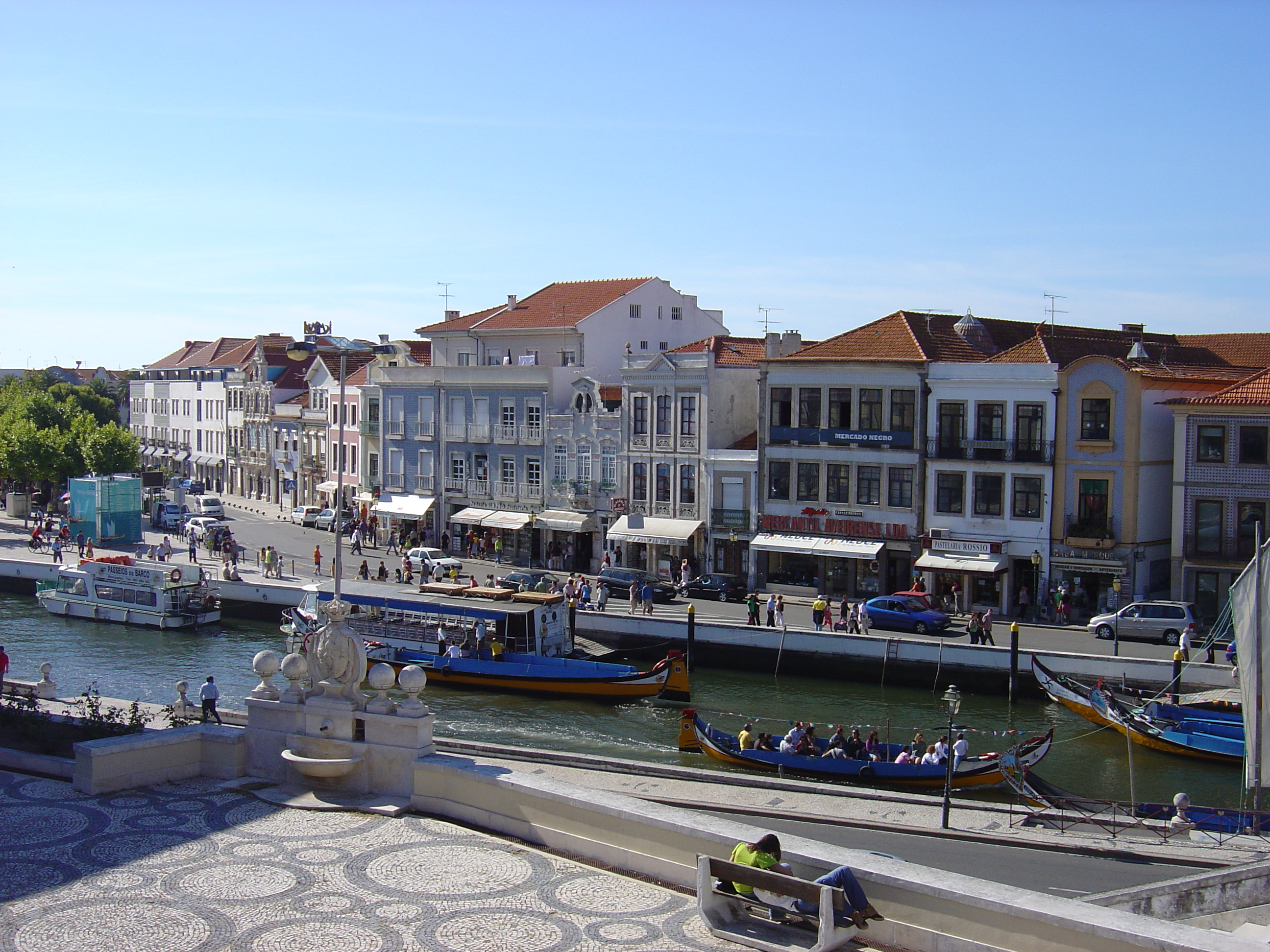
- The canal along Rua João Mendonça along the old border between Glória and Vera Cruz

- Location in Portugal
- Coordinates: 40°38′36.6″N 8°39′7.1″W
- Country: Portugal
- Region: Centro
- Intermunic. comm.: Região de Aveiro
- District: Aveiro
- Municipality: Aveiro

Area
  - Total: 45.32 km^{2} (17.50 sq mi)

Population (2011)
  - Total: 18,756
  - Density: 413.9/km^{2} (1,072/sq mi)
- Time zone: UTC+00:00 (WET)
  - Summer (DST): UTC+01:00 (WEST)
- Website: Junta Freguesia

Glória e Vera Cruz is a civil parish in the municipality of Aveiro, in the central Portuguese district of Aveiro. It was constituted in 2013, following the national administrative reform, through aggregation of the civil parishes of Glória and Vera Cruz, resulting a cumulative population of 18756 inhabitants dispersed through a total area of 45.32 square kilometres (17.50 mi^{2}).
