= Deaths in November 2009 =

The following is a list of notable deaths in November 2009.

Entries for each day are listed alphabetically by surname. A typical entry lists information in the following sequence:

- Name, age, country of citizenship at birth, subsequent country of citizenship (if applicable), reason for notability, cause of death (if known), and reference.

== November 2009 ==
=== 1 ===
- Zev Aelony, 71, American civil rights activist.
- Sakher Habash, 69, Palestinian party official (Fatah), stroke.
- Esther Hautzig, 79, American Holocaust survivor and writer.
- Endel Laas, 94, Estonian forest scientist.
- Manfred Losch, 70, German Olympic athlete.
- Seán Mac Fhionnghaile, 57, Irish actor, cancer.
- Arturo Salazar Mejía, 88, Colombian Roman Catholic Bishop of Pasto.
- Alda Merini, 78, Italian poet.
- Gopal Mishra, 77, Indian journalist.
- Gus Mitges, 90, Canadian politician, MP for Grey—Simcoe (1972–1988) and Bruce—Grey (1988–1993).
- Alan Ogg, 42, American basketball player (Miami Heat), complications from staphylococcal infection.
- Robert H. Rines, 87, American scientist, inventor, composer and Loch Ness Monster expert, heart failure.
- Achim Stocker, 74, German football official, chairman of SC Freiburg, heart attack.
- George Zoritch, 92, Russian-born American dancer.

=== 2 ===
- Haya bint Abdulaziz Al Saud, 80, Saudi royal, sister of King Abdullah.
- Nien Cheng, 94, Chinese author and political prisoner.
- Lou Filippo, 83, American boxing referee and judge, member of the World Boxing Hall of Fame, stroke.
- Evelyn Hofer, 87, German-born photographer.
- Brian James, 91, Australian actor, complications from a fall.
- Shabtai Kalmanovich, 61, Russian former KGB spy, president of WBC Spartak Moscow Region, shot.
- Keith Kettleborough, 74, British footballer (Sheffield United).
- José Luis López Vázquez, 87, Spanish actor.
- Yael Lotan, 74, Israeli writer, editor and translator, liver cancer.
- Phil Lumpkin, 57, American NBA player and high school basketball coach, pneumonia.
- Ron Moeller, 71, American baseball player.
- Roman Moravec, 58, Slovak Olympic athlete.
- Beverley O'Sullivan, 28, Irish singer, traffic collision.
- Amir Pnueli, 68, Israeli computer scientist and Turing Award winner.
- Glenn Remick, 58, American founder of American Darters Association, member of National Darts Hall of Fame, amyloidosis.
- Mark Smith, 49, British bassist (The Waterboys) and record producer.
- Leonard Steinberg, Baron Steinberg, 73, British businessman and life peer.
- Lonnie Zamora, 76, American alleged UFO witness, heart failure.

=== 3 ===
- Charles August, 90, American businessman, founder of Monro Muffler Brake.
- Francisco Ayala, 103, Spanish novelist.
- Archie Baird, 90, Scottish footballer (Aberdeen).
- Carl Ballantine, 92, American actor (McHale's Navy), natural causes.
- Brother Blue, 88, American storyteller, performance artist.
- Dodo Chichinadze, 84, Georgian actress.
- Sir John Crofton, 97, British medical pioneer.
- Jean B. Cryor, 70, American politician, cancer.
- Shel Dorf, 76, American founder of San Diego Comic-Con, diabetes-related complications.
- Parry Gordon, 64, English rugby league player.
- Tamás Lossonczy, 105, Hungarian abstract painter.
- Lorissa McComas, 38, American softcore model and actress.
- Toshiyuki Mimura, 61, Japanese baseball player and manager (Hiroshima Toyo Carp).
- Alice S. Rossi, 87, American sociologist and feminist.

=== 4 ===
- Win Aung, 65, Burmese politician and military officer, Minister of Foreign Affairs (1998–2004).
- William H. Avery, 98, American politician, representative for Kansas (1955–1965), Governor of Kansas (1965–1967).
- Sir Don Beaven, 85, New Zealand scientist and diabetes researcher, house fire.
- Ivan Biakov, 65, Russian Olympic gold medal-winning biathlete (1972, 1976)
- Hubertus Brandenburg, 85, German-born Roman Catholic Bishop of Stockholm (1977–1998).
- Stefano Chiodi, 52, Italian footballer.
- Art D'Lugoff, 85, American jazz nightclub owner (The Village Gate), heart attack.
- Kabun Mutō, 82, Japanese politician, Minister for Foreign Affairs (1993), pancreatic cancer.
- Thomas P. O'Malley, 79, American academic, president of Loyola Marymount University (1991–1999), heart attack.
- Antonio Pelle, 77, Italian 'Ndrangheta boss, heart attack.
- David Tree, 94, British actor.

=== 5 ===
- Peter Chen Bolu, 96, Chinese Roman Catholic Bishop of Daming.
- I. F. Clarke, 91, British literary scholar.
- Roy Collins, 75, English cricketer.
- Adam Firestorm, 32, New Zealand-born Canadian professional wrestler, suicide.
- Luigi Fuin, 81, Italian footballer.
- Félix Luna, 84, Argentinian historian.
- Lucien Maelfait, 90, French cyclist.
- Barrie Rickards, 71, British palaeontologist and angler, cancer.
- Winifred Tumim, Lady Tumim, 73, British charity executive and campaigner.

=== 6 ===
- Manuel Arvizu, 90, Mexican Roman Catholic Bishop of Jesús María del Nayar.
- Nick Counter, 69, American film executive and lawyer.
- Dimitri De Fauw, 28, Belgian track cyclist, suicide.
- Abraham Escudero Montoya, 69, Colombian Roman Catholic Bishop of Palmira.
- Robert Hilborn Falls, 85, Canadian admiral, Chief of the Defence Staff (1977–1980).
- Waldo Hunt, 88, American publisher.
- Gylman Ilkin, 95, Soviet and Azerbaijani writer.
- Jacno, 52, French musician, cancer.
- Otomar Krejča, 87, Czech theatre director.
- Hans Lund, 59, American poker player, cancer.
- Antonio Rosario Mennonna, 103, Italian prelate of the Roman Catholic Church.
- Tommy Reis, 95, American baseball player.
- Donald Rix, 78, Canadian pathologist and philanthropist.
- Manuel Solís Palma, 91, Panamanian President (1988–1989), pulmonary edema.
- Ron Sproat, 77, American television writer (Dark Shadows), heart attack.

=== 7 ===
- Yelena Bondarchuk, 47, Russian actress, breast cancer.
- Gene D. Cohen, 65, American psychiatrist, prostate cancer.
- Bob Dillinger, 91, American baseball player.
- Anselmo Duarte, 89, Brazilian actor, screenwriter and film director, complications from a stroke.
- Bernardo Garza Sada, 79, Mexican businessman, founder of ALFA.
- Donald Harington, 73, American author, cancer.
- Chris Harman, 66, British socialist journalist and activist.
- Billy Ingham, 57, British footballer (Burnley).
- Joe Maross, 86, American actor, cardiac arrest.
- Alayna Morgan, 61, American obese woman.
- Allan Mulder, 81, Australian politician, MP (1972–1975).
- David C. Smith, 80, American historian.

=== 8 ===
- Ellen Ahrndt, 87, American baseball player (All-American Girls Professional Baseball League).
- Hiley Edwards, 58, English cricketer (Devon), cancer.
- Jerry Fuchs, 34, American drummer (Maserati, !!!), fall.
- Armin Gessert, 46, German video game developer, heart attack.
- Vitaly Ginzburg, 93, Russian physicist, Nobel Prize laureate.
- Burleigh Hines, 74, American journalist.
- Sir Patrick Howard-Dobson, 88, British army general.
- Karl Kroeber, 83, American literary scholar of Native American literature, cancer.
- Malcolm Laycock, 71, British radio DJ.
- Igor Starygin, 63, Russian actor, complications from a stroke.

=== 9 ===
- Sedley Andrus, 94, British herald.
- Al Cervi, 92, American basketball player and coach (Rochester Royals, Syracuse Nationals).
- Earl Cooley, 98, American smokejumper.
- Clen Denning, 98, Australian footballer, oldest surviving Australian Football League player.
- Henry L. Kimelman, 88, American Ambassador to Haiti (1980–1981), heart failure.
- Earsell Mackbee, 68, American football player (Minnesota Vikings), complications following a stroke.
- Ib Olsen, 80, Danish Olympic bronze medal-winning (1948) rower.
- Mehdi Sahabi, 66, Iranian writer and translator, heart attack.
- Charles Proctor Sifton, 74, American federal judge, sarcoidosis.
- Stephen Verney, 90, British Anglican prelate, Bishop of Repton (1977–1985).
- Nick Waterlow, 69, British-born Australian artistic director and curator, stabbed.

=== 10 ===
- Robert Cameron, 98, American aerial photographer.
- Gheorghe Dinică, 75, Romanian actor, cardiac arrest.
- Robert Enke, 32, German footballer, suicide by train.
- Tomaž Humar, 40, Slovenian mountaineer, mountaineering accident.
- Amadi Ikwechegh, 58, Nigerian naval officer, protracted illness following a stroke.
- Simple Kapadia, 51, Indian actress and costume designer, cancer.
- Dick Katz, 85, American jazz pianist and arranger, lung cancer.
- David Lloyd, 75, American comedy writer ("Chuckles Bites the Dust"), prostate cancer.
- Uolevi Manninen, 72, Finnish Olympic basketball player.
- Hisaya Morishige, 96, Japanese actor, natural causes.
- John Allen Muhammad, 48, American convicted spree killer (Beltway Sniper), executed by lethal injection.
- Anne Mustoe, 76, British headmistress, cyclist and writer.
- Ramin Pourandarjani, 26, Iranian doctor, whistleblower on use of torture, poisoned.
- José Afonso Ribeiro, 80, Brazilian Roman Catholic Bishop of Borba.

=== 11 ===
- Dámaso Ruiz-Jarabo Colomer, 60, Spanish jurist, Advocate General of the European Court of Justice.
- Keith Fagnou, 38, Canadian organic chemist, complications of H1N1 influenza.
- Ehsan Fatahian, 28, Iranian Kurdish activist, executed by hanging.
- William Ganz, 90, Slovak-born American cardiologist, co-inventor of the pulmonary artery catheter, natural causes.
- Henry Jayasena, 78, Sri Lankan actor, colon cancer.
- Irving Kriesberg, 90, American expressionist artist, complications from Parkinson's disease.
- Tom Merriman, 85, American jingle composer, complications from a fall.
- Marvin Minoff, 78, American film and television producer (The Nixon Interviews, Patch Adams).
- John Jay O'Connor, 79, American lawyer, husband of Sandra Day O'Connor, Alzheimer's disease.
- Helge Reiss, 81, Norwegian actor.

=== 12 ===
- Elisabeth Aasen, 87, Norwegian politician.
- Mohamed Abdi Aware, Somali judge, Chief Justice of Puntland, shot.
- Vagrich Bakhchanyan, 71, Ukrainian-born American painter, apparent suicide.
- Frances Lasker Brody, 93, American art collector and philanthropist.
- Eleanor Hovda, 69, American composer and dancer.
- Robert Kendall, 82, American actor, heart attack.
- Willy Kernen, 80, Swiss footballer, participated in World Cup (1950, 1954, 1962).
- James R. Lilley, 81, American diplomat, ambassador to South Korea and China, complications linked to prostate cancer.
- Henri Sérandour, 72, French International Olympic Committee member, former head of the French National Olympic Committee.
- Florence Temko, 88, American origami expert, heart failure.
- Paul Wendkos, 87, American television and film director (Gidget), complications of a stroke.
- Emanuel Zisman, 74, Israeli politician, Member of Knesset (1988–1999).

=== 13 ===
- Roy Butler, 83, American politician, first directly elected mayor of Austin, Texas (1971–1975), complications from a fall.
- Emin Doybak, 78–79, Turkish Olympic sprinter.
- Michał Gajownik, 27, Polish Olympic sprint canoer, traffic collision.
- Ueli Gegenschatz, 38, Swiss BASE jumper, jumping accident.
- Dell Hymes, 82, American anthropologist, linguist and folklorist, complications of Alzheimer's disease.
- Blas Jiménez, 60, Dominican nationalist, poet and essayist.
- Bruce King, 85, American politician, three-term Governor of New Mexico, complications from heart procedure.
- Ron Klimkowski, 65, American baseball player, heart failure.
- Bernard Kolélas, 76, Congolese politician, Mayor of Brazzaville, prime minister (1997).
- Mara Manzan, 57, Brazilian actress, lung cancer.
- John J. O'Connor, 76, American television critic (The New York Times), lung cancer.
- Armen Takhtajan, 99, Soviet botanist.

=== 14 ===
- Nikolay Anikin, 77, Russian-born American Olympic gold medal skiing champion (1956 Olympics), cancer.
- Edgar Fay, 101, British judge.
- Moshe Gidron, 84, Israeli Major General.
- John F. Gregory, 82, American optical engineer.
- Thomas Hollyman, 89, American photographer.
- Niels Ingwersen, 74, Danish scholar.
- Travis LaRue, 96, American politician, Mayor of Austin, Texas (1969–1971).
- John McWilliam, 68, British politician, MP for Blaydon (1979–2005).
- Lewis Millett, 88, American Medal of Honor recipient.
- David A. Olsen, 71, American businessman.
- Ladislav Sitenský, 90, Czech photographer.

=== 15 ===
- Derek B, 44, British rapper, heart attack.
- Tia Barrett, 62, New Zealand ambassador and diplomat, High Commissioner to the Cook Islands (2009).
- Richard Carlyle, 95, Canadian actor.
- Ray Charnley, 74, English footballer (Blackpool, Morecambe).
- Dennis Cole, 69, American actor, renal failure.
- Andriy Fedchuk, 29, Ukrainian Olympic bronze medal-winning boxer (2000), traffic collision.
- Karol Galba, 88, Slovak football official.
- Pierre Harmel, 98, Belgian politician, prime minister (1965–1966).
- Natalicio Lima, 91, Brazilian guitarist (Los Indios Tabajaras), stomach cancer.
- Ambrose Mathalaimuthu, 84, Indian Bishop of Coimbatore.
- Hans Matthöfer, 84, German politician, minister of finance (1978–1982).
- Anna Mendelssohn, 61, British poet and political activist (Angry Brigade), brain tumour.
- Allan Murdmaa, 75, Estonian architect.
- Ken Ober, 52, American comedian and game show host (Remote Control).
- Pavle, Serbian Patriarch, 95, Serbian 44th Patriarch of the Serbian Orthodox Church, cardiac arrest.
- Jim Pead, 85, Australian politician.
- Jocelyn Quivrin, 30, French actor, traffic collision.
- Earl Wentz, 71, American composer and performer.

=== 16 ===
- Pablo Amaringo, 71, Peruvian artist.
- Eddie Bell, 78, American football player (Philadelphia Eagles, New York Titans), heart failure.
- Jeff Clyne, 72, British jazz bassist, heart attack.
- Antonio de Nigris, 31, Mexican football player, heart failure.
- Robert J. Frankel, 68, American thoroughbred horse trainer, leukemia.
- Ken Kirk, 71, American football player.
- Jan Leighton, 87, American actor, complications from a stroke.
- Anne-Sofie Østvedt, 89, Norwegian intelligence operative for XU.
- Jack Wong Sue, 84, Australian Z Special Unit member and businessman.
- Harry Taylor, 83, Canadian ice hockey player.
- Bucky Williams, 102, American baseball player, second-oldest Negro league baseball player.
- Edward Woodward, 79, British actor (The Equalizer, The Wicker Man, Hot Fuzz).

=== 17 ===
- José Aboulker, 89, Algerian World War II resistance fighter.
- Peter Armstrong, 80, American Roman Catholic priest, apparent heart attack.
- John Craxton, 87, British painter.
- Josine van Dalsum, 61, Dutch actress, cancer.
- Michael Dias, 88, Sri Lankan-born British legal scholar.
- Niku Kheradmand, 77, Iranian actress, complications of a heart attack.
- Nikolay Olyalin, 68, Russian actor.
- Sy Syms, 83, American entrepreneur, founder and chairman of off-price clothier SYMS, heart failure.

=== 18 ===
- Johnny Almond, 63, British jazz and rock musician (Mark-Almond), cancer.
- Abrar Alvi, 82, Indian film director and screenwriter (Sahib Bibi Aur Ghulam), stomach complications.
- Albert Crewe, 82, British-born American physicist, invented scanning transmission electron microscope, Parkinson's disease.
- Jeanne-Claude, 74, French environmental artist (The Gates), complications from a ruptured brain aneurysm.
- Gordon Hewit, 51, British Olympic swimmer.
- Red Robbins, 65, American basketball player, cancer.
- Salem Saad, 31, Emirati footballer (Al-Nasr SC), heart attack.
- Ana Vásquez-Bronfman, 77, Chilean sociologist and writer.

=== 19 ===
- Frank Beattie, 76, Scottish footballer (Kilmarnock F.C.).
- Johnny Delgado, 61, Filipino actor, lymphoma.
- John Gray, 75, British banker.
- Daul Kim, 20, South Korean fashion model, suicide by hanging.
- Pat Mackie, 95, New Zealand-born Australian trade unionist.
- Denis McNamara, 83, British Olympic wrestler.
- David Nokes, 61, British scholar.
- Sir Noel Power, 79, Australian acting Chief Justice of the Supreme Court of Hong Kong (1996–1997), heart attack.
- Jim Stanfield, 62, Canadian ice hockey player.
- Nao Takasugi, 87, American politician, member of the California State Assembly (1993–1999), stroke.

=== 20 ===
- Robert Foxcroft, 75, Canadian Olympic fencer.
- Martino Gomiero, 85, Italian Roman Catholic Bishop of Adria-Rovigo.
- Ghulam Mustafa Jatoi, 78, Pakistani politician, Chief Minister of Sindh (1973–1977); prime minister (1990).
- Mayer Kirshenblatt, 93, Canadian painter.
- Lino Lacedelli, 83, Italian mountaineer, first man to reach the summit of K2.
- H. C. Robbins Landon, 83, American musicologist.
- Celso Pitta, 63, Brazilian politician, Mayor of São Paulo (1997–2000), colorectal cancer.
- Herbert Richers, 86, Brazilian filmmaker and voice artist, kidney failure.
- Max Robertson, 94, British radio broadcaster.
- Alejandro R. Ruiz, 85, American World War II Medal of Honor recipient.
- Lester Shubin, 84, American developer of the bulletproof Kevlar vest, heart attack.
- Elisabeth Söderström, 82, Swedish soprano, complications from a stroke.
- Roman Trakhtenberg, 41, Russian actor, television and radio presenter, heart attack.
- Ted Weill, 84, American politician.
- Charis Wilson, 95, American model and writer.

=== 21 ===
- Gerhard Aspheim, 79, Norwegian jazz trombonist.
- Bernard Bonnin, 70, Filipino actor, diabetes.
- Sir Edward Fennessy, 97, British electronic engineer.
- Konstantin Feoktistov, 83, Russian cosmonaut and aerospace engineer.
- Frank Fidler, 86, English footballer (Bournemouth, Hereford United).
- Tom Janik, 69, American footballer (Denver Broncos, Buffalo Bills).
- Ken Krueger, 83, American publisher, co-founder and chairman of San Diego Comic-Con, heart attack.
- Rena Kanokogi, 74, American judoka, multiple myeloma.
- Johnny Påhlsson, 68, Swedish Olympic sport shooter.
- Paige Palmer, 93, American fitness trainer.
- Art Savage, 58, American CEO (San Jose Sharks) (1990–1996) and co-owner (Sacramento River Cats) (1999–2009), lung cancer.
- Allen Shelton, 73, American banjo player, leukemia.

=== 22 ===
- Billy Joe Daugherty, 57, American Christian minister, lymphoma.
- Sir John Grugeon, 81, British politician.
- Jeong Nam-gyu, 40, South Korean serial killer, suicide.
- Ali Kordan, 51, Iranian politician, Minister of the Interior (2008), multiple myeloma.
- Juan Carlos Muñoz, 90, Argentinian footballer, heart attack.
- Haydain Neale, 39, Canadian singer–songwriter (jacksoul), lung cancer.
- Francisco Rodriguez, 25, American Golden Gloves boxer, brain injury sustained during match.
- Émile Vanfasse, 69, French Polynesian politician, finance minister (2004–2006).

=== 23 ===
- José Arraño Acevedo, 88, Chilean writer and historian, pneumonia.
- Paul K. Carlton, 88, American Air Force general.
- Jean-Édouard Desmedt, 83, Belgian scientist.
- Philip Kueber, 75, Canadian Olympic silver medal-winning (1956) rower.
- Pim Koopman, 56, Dutch progressive rock drummer (Kayak).
- Richard Meale, 77, Australian composer.
- Tony Parry, 64, British footballer (Hartlepool United), pneumonia.
- Pat Quinn, 74, Irish businessman, founder of the Quinnsworth supermarket chain, renal failure.
- Frederick H. Schultz, 80, American businessman and politician, Speaker of the Florida House of Representatives (1969–1970).
- Yang Xianyi, 94, Chinese translator.

=== 24 ===
- Ayub Afridi, 70-79, Pakistani drug smuggler and politician.
- Amy Black, 36, British mezzo-soprano opera singer.
- Chan Hung-lit, 66, Hong Kong actor, heart failure.
- Francis French, 7th Baron de Freyne, 82, Irish aristocrat.
- Gonçalves Isabelinha, 100, Portuguese footballer and physician.
- Kan Ishii, 80, Japanese composer.
- Irena Nawrocka, 92, Polish Olympic fencer.
- George Parsons, 83, British rugby union and rugby league player.
- Abe Pollin, 85, American businessman, owner of Washington Wizards and Washington Capitals, corticobasal degeneration.
- Hale Smith, 84, American composer and arranger, complications of a stroke.
- Samak Sundaravej, 74, Thai politician, prime minister (2008), liver cancer.

=== 25 ===
- Albert Dolhats, 88, French cyclist.
- Jean Serge Essous, 74, Congolese musician.
- Beatrice Gray, 98, American actress.
- Giorgio Carbone, 73, Italian self-proclaimed head of state of the Principality of Seborga micronation.
- Frans Haarsma, 88, Dutch professor of pastoral theology.
- William Norman, 77, New Zealand cricketer.

=== 26 ===
- Pia Beck, 84, Dutch jazz pianist and singer, heart failure.
- Avery Clayton, 62, American executive director, heart attack.
- Gordon Easson, 81, Scottish footballer.
- Peter Forakis, 82, American artist.
- Robert J. Fox, 81, American Catholic priest, cancer.
- Nikola Kovachev, 75, Bulgarian football player and manager.
- Lis Løwert, 89, Danish film actress.
- Geoffrey Moorhouse, 77, British journalist and author, stroke.
- Ecaterina Stahl-Iencic, 60, Romanian Olympic fencer.

=== 27 ===
- Mariano Abarca, 51, Mexican activist, shot.
- Al Alberts, 87, American singer (The Four Aces), kidney failure.
- Jacques Baratier, 91, French film director and screenwriter.
- Erich Böhme, 79, German journalist, editor of Der Spiegel (1973–1989), cancer.
- Jacques Braunstein, 78, Romanian-born Venezuelan economist, publicist and jazz disc jockey, heart failure.
- William Bresnan, 75, American businessman, founder of Bresnan Communications, cancer.
- Jeffrey Grayson, 67, American businessman and criminal.
- Bess Lomax Hawes, 88, American folklorist and musician, stroke.
- Geneviève Joy, 90, French pianist.
- Alice McGrath, 92, American activist (Sleepy Lagoon murder trial), infection from a chronic illness.
- Sir Anthony Mullens, 73, British army general.
- Mike Penner, 52, American sportswriter (Los Angeles Times), suicide by carbon monoxide poisoning.
- Irving Tripp, 88, American comic book artist (Little Lulu), cancer.
- Larry Turner, 70, American politician, member of the Tennessee House of Representatives (since 1985).
- Linda Uttley, 43, English rugby union player (national team), leiomyosarcoma
- Warren Vanders, 79, American actor, lung cancer.

=== 28 ===
- René Barret, 87, French cyclist.
- Gilles Carle, 81, Canadian film director and screenwriter, complications from Parkinson's disease.
- David Aaron Clark, 49, American pornographic actor and film director, pulmonary embolism.
- Bjartmar Gjerde, 78, Norwegian politician, cabinet minister and broadcasting executive.
- Bob Keane, 87, American music producer and manager, founder of Del-Fi Records, renal failure.
- Eric Kemp, 94, British Church of England theologian, Bishop of Chichester (1974–2001).
- Tony Kendall, 73, Italian actor (Kommissar X series).
- Patrick Konchellah, 41, Kenyan runner, stomach cancer.
- Samuel Martin, 85, American linguist.
- Koichi Saito, 80, Japanese film director and photographer, pneumonia.
- Jerry Shipkey, 84, American football player (Pittsburgh Steelers, Chicago Bears).
- Joaquín Vargas Gómez, 84, Mexican media owner, founder of MVS Comunicaciones, natural causes.

=== 29 ===
- Don Addis, 74, American strip artist, lung cancer.
- Prince Alexandre of Belgium, 67, Belgian royal, pulmonary embolism.
- Andrew Donald Booth, 91, British computer scientist.
- Mary Call Darby Collins, 98, American First Lady of Florida (1955–1961).
- George Cummins, 78, Irish footballer (Everton, Luton Town, Republic of Ireland).
- Nora David, Baroness David, 96, British politician, member of the House of Lords.
- Gilbert-Antoine Duchêne, 90, French Bishop of Saint-Claude (1975–1994).
- Princess Farial of Egypt, 71, Egyptian royal, oldest child of King Farouk, stomach cancer.
- Ghalib al-Hinai, 96, Omani Ibadi religious leader.
- Robert Holdstock, 61, British science fiction author, Escherichia coli infection.
- Tamara Lisitsian, 86, Soviet film director.
- Solange Magnano, 37, Argentinian beauty queen (Miss Argentina, 1994), pulmonary embolism.
- Richard Mayne, 83, British international civil servant, broadcaster and critic.
- Karl Peglau, 82, German traffic psychologist, creator of the Ampelmännchen traffic lights.
- Lee Pelty, 74, American stage actor, lung cancer.
- Jerneja Perc, 38, Slovenian athlete, cancer.
- John Storm Roberts, 73, American ethnomusician.
- Roy Hendry Thomson, 77, British politician.

=== 30 ===
- Christopher Anvil, 84, American science fiction writer.
- George Atkins, 92, Canadian radio and TV presenter (CBC), founder of Farm Radio International, kidney failure.
- Mustafa Avcioğlu-Çakmak, 99, Turkish Olympic wrestler.
- Dot Bailey, 92, New Zealand cricketer.
- George Bickford, 82, Australian football player.
- Asim Butt, 42, Pakistani-born British cricketer.
- Margaret Christensen, 88, Australian actress.
- Emile Eid, 84, Lebanese Roman Catholic titular bishop of Sarepta dei Maroniti.
- Brent Green, 33, Australian football player, drowned.
- Charles Miller Metzner, 97, American federal judge.
- Paul Naschy, 75, Spanish actor, screenwriter and director, pancreatic cancer.
- Milorad Pavić, 80, Serbian writer, heart failure.
- Lucian Pulvermacher, 91, American head of the True Catholic Church.
