= South Africa at the 1948 Summer Olympics =

- IOC code: RSA (ZAF used at these Games)
- NOC: South African Olympic and Empire Games Association

in London
- Competitors: 35 (34 men, 1 woman) in 10 sports
- Medals Ranked 18th: Gold 2 Silver 1 Bronze 1 Total 4

Summer Olympics appearances (overview)
- 1904; 1908; 1912; 1920; 1924; 1928; 1932; 1936; 1948; 1952; 1956; 1960; 1964–1988; 1992; 1996; 2000; 2004; 2008; 2012; 2016; 2020; 2024

The Union of South Africa competed at the 1948 Summer Olympics in London, England. 35 competitors, 34 men and 1 woman, took part in 34 events in 10 sports.

== Medalists ==
=== Gold ===
- Gerald Dreyer – Boxing, Men's Lightweight
- George Hunter – Boxing, Men's Light Heavyweight

=== Silver ===
- Dennis Shepherd – Boxing, Men's Featherweight

=== Bronze ===
- John Arthur – Boxing, Men's Heavyweight

== Cycling ==
Three cyclists, all men, represented South Africa in 1948.

Individual road race

- Dirkie Binneman
- George Estman
- Wally Rivers

Team road race

- Dirkie Binneman
- George Estman
- Wally Rivers

== Diving ==
Men

Athlete	Event	Final	
Athlete	Event	Points	Rank
Geoff Mandy	10 m platform	86.00	21

== Rowing ==
South Africa had five male rowers participate in two out of seven rowing events in 1948.

Men's single sculls

- Ian Stephen

Men's coxless four

- Edgar Ramsay
- Austin Ikin
- Des Maybery
- Claude Kietzman

== Swimming ==
Men

Athlete	Event	Heat		Semifinal		Final	
Athlete	Event	Time	Rank	Time	Rank	Time	Rank
Don Johnston	400 m freestyle	4:57.4	11 Q	4:59.5	14	Did not advance	
Don Johnston	1500 m freestyle	20:41.8	17	Did not advance			
Jackie Wiid	100 m backstroke	1:08.5	1 Q*	1:09.2	3 Q*	1:09.1	6
Des Cohen	200 m breaststroke	3:03.3	30	Did not advance			

*Ranks given are within the heat.
