= Robert Perew =

American Olympic rower (1923–1999)

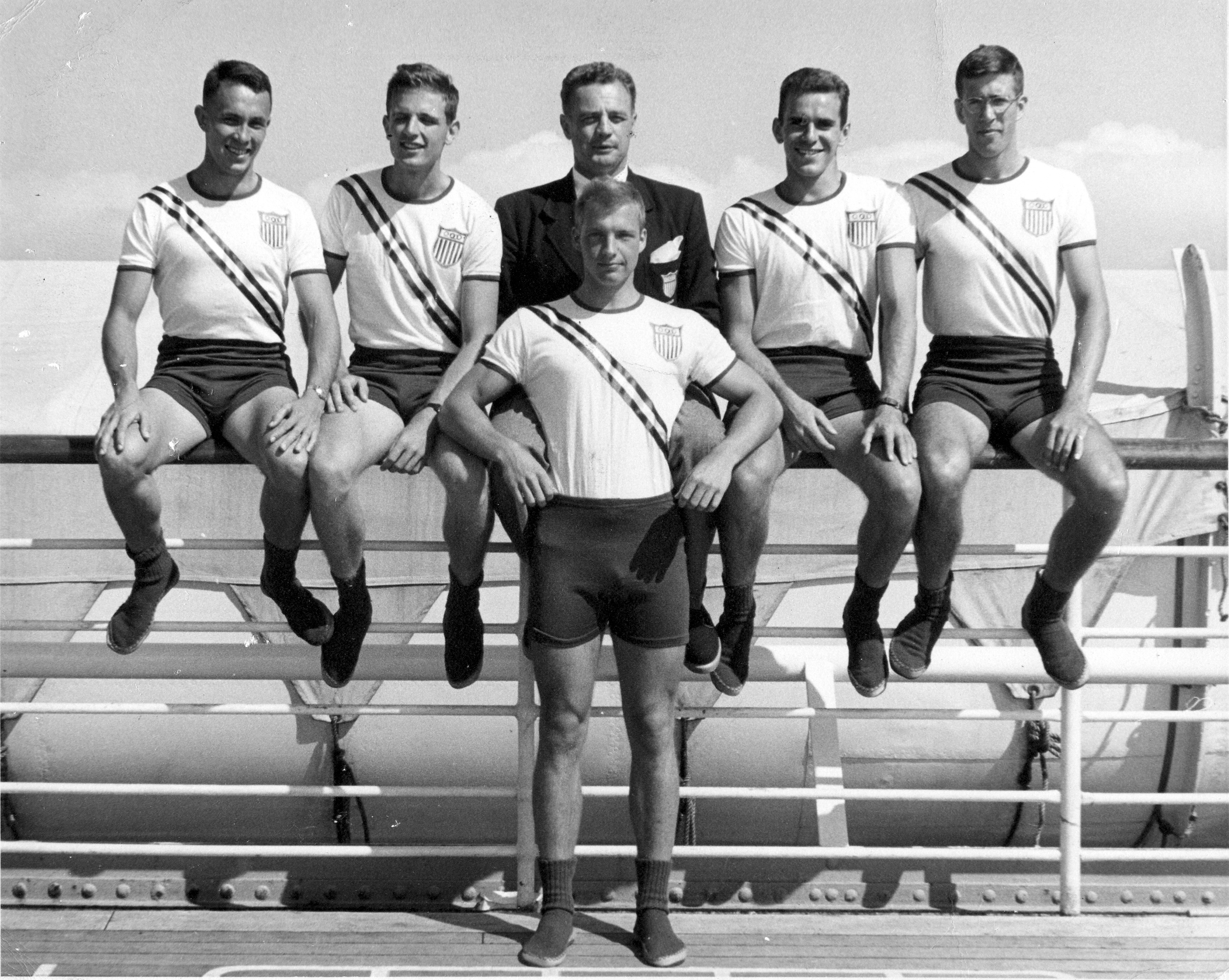
- 1948 Summer Olympic U.S. Rowing Team - Men's Coxless Fours

Personal information
- Full name: Robert Strahan Perew
- Nickname: Bob
- Born: August 5, 1923 Philadelphia, Pennsylvania, U.S.
- Died: November 14, 1999 (aged 76) Denton, Texas, U.S.
- Education: Yale University
- Occupation: Sales manager

Sport
- Sport: Rowing
- Position: Bow seat
- University team: Yale Bulldogs
- Club: West Side Rowing Club
Medal record
Representing United States
Men's athletics
Bronze medal – third place	1948 London	Coxless four

Robert "Bob" Strahan Perew (August 5, 1923 – November 14, 1999) was an American oarsman who was a bronze medalist in the 1948 Summer Olympics.

== Early life ==
Perew was born in Philadelphia, Pennsylvania. His parents were Bernice (née Strahan) and Robert Jackman Perew.

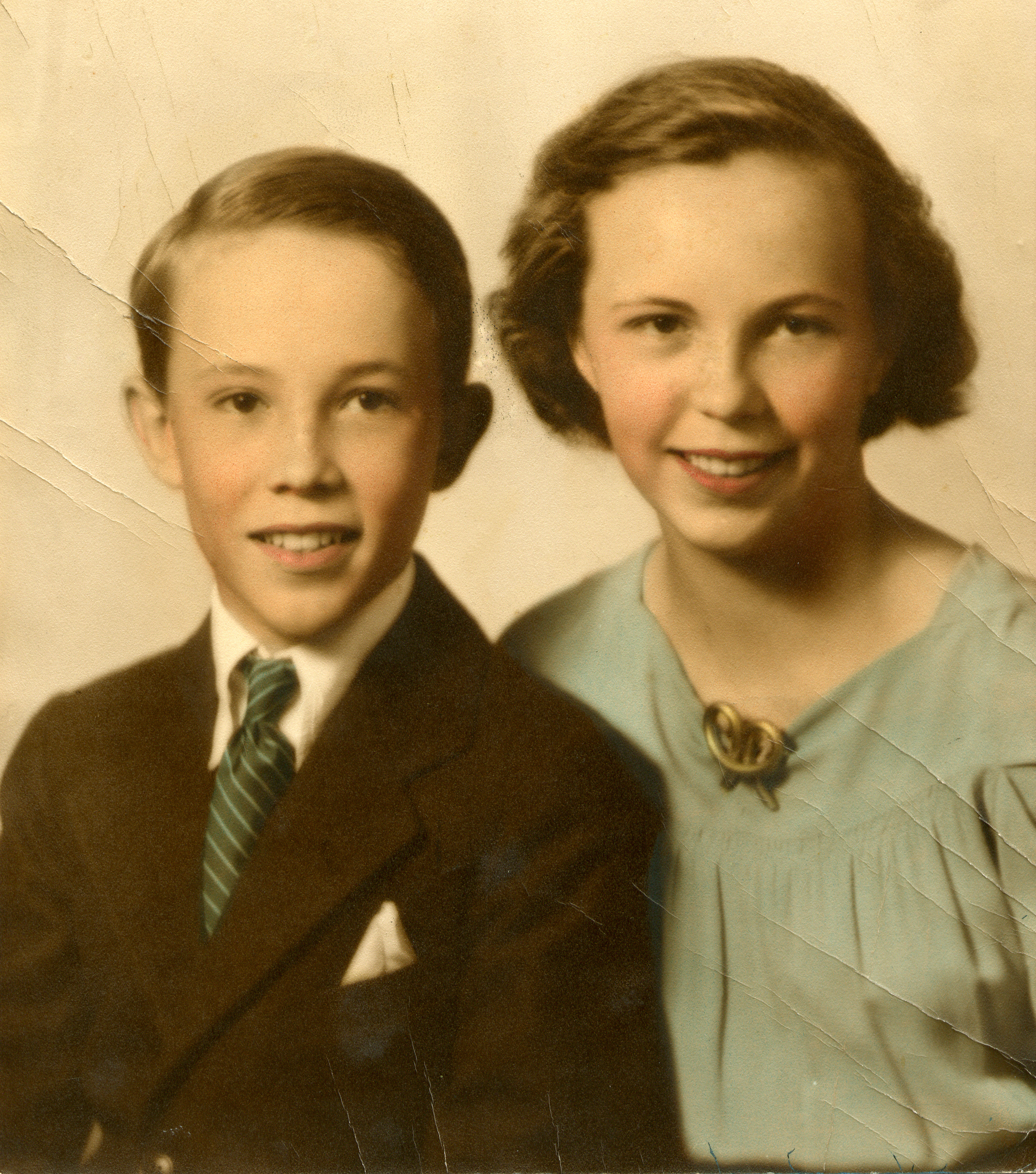
Robert Perew and sister Alice, 1937

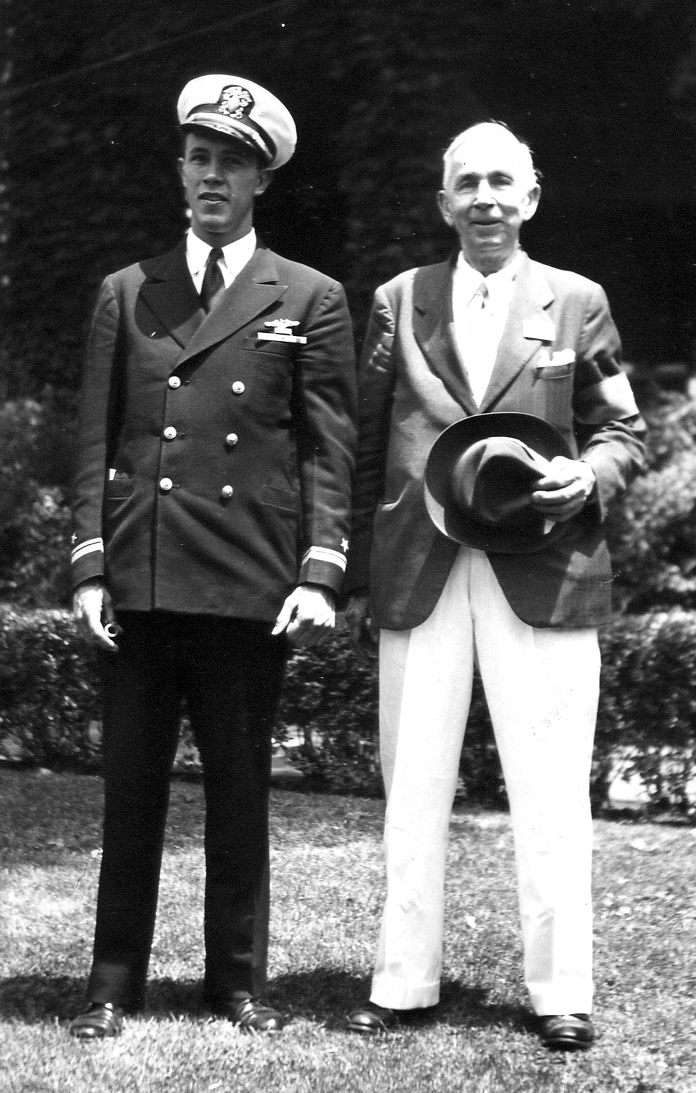
Robert Perew (in Navy uniform) and his father at the latter's 50th class reunion, Yale University,1946

Perew lived in Buffalo, New York, and West Palm Beach, Florida during his youth. He graduated from Lafayette High School in Buffalo in 1941.

He then attended Yale University. Midway through his college career, he enlisted in the submarine service of the U.S. Navy. He was commissioned a communications officer on the USS Thornback (SS-418), serving in the Pacific during World War II.

After the war, Perew returned to Yale, graduating in 1948 with a degree in mechanical engineering.

== Rowing ==
Perew began rowing while in high school at Buffalo's West Side Rowing Club. During college he was a member of the Yale Bulldogs' crew team in 1947 and 1948.

While still in college, he was on the U.S. team at the 1948 Olympics. He was part of the Men's Coxless Fours who took the bronze medal, alongside Gregory Gates, Stuart Griffing, and Frederick Kingsbury. He had the bow seat.

== Career ==
Perew worked for General Electric and Electric Boat. He was then the sale manager for the northeast area for York International, retiring in 1989.

He also served in the Navy Reserve until 1989, achieving the rank of lieutenant commander.

== Personal life ==
He lived near Long Island Sound in Waterford, Connecticut for over forty years. He had two daughters, Ann and Joyce.

He was a member of the Yale-Harvard Regatta Committee for many years. He was also a member of the Retired Officers Association, Veterans of Foreign Wars, and the U.S. Olympic Alumni Association. In addition, he was a member of St. James Episcopal Church in New London, Connecticut.

In 1999, he died in Denton, Texas, where he lived from 1996 to 1999.
