= Loyola Catholic School =

Private coeducational school in Mankato, Minnesota, United States

- Loyola
- LCS

Location
- 145 Good Counsel Drive; Mankato, (Blue Earth County), Minnesota 56001; United States; 44°10′57″N 93°58′34″W

Information
- Type: Private, Coeducational
- Religious affiliation: Roman Catholic
- Patron saint: St. Ignatius of Loyola
- Established: 1865
- Staff: 88
- Grades: Preschool–12
- Average class size: 40
- Colors: Blue and Gold
- Slogan: Leading through Faith, Academic Excellence, and Service
- Sports: Football, Soccer, Cross Country, Basketball, Volleyball, Track & Field, Baseball, Hockey, Swim & Dive,
- Mascot: Crusader
- Team name: Crusaders
- Accreditation: North Central Association of Colleges and Schools
- Tuition: $5475
- Website: loyolacatholicschool.org

Loyola Catholic School is located in Mankato, Minnesota, United States. The school is part of the Roman Catholic Diocese of Winona-Rochester and serves students in PreK-Grade 12.

== History ==
The first Catholic school in Mankato was started at Saints Peter and Paul Catholic Church in 1865. Other elementary schools in Mankato/North Mankato were founded at Holy Rosary Catholic Church in 1925, St. John The Baptist Catholic Church in 1942, and St. Joseph the Worker Catholic Church in 1958. The first Catholic high school in Mankato was founded as Loyola High School in 1908. In addition, Good Counsel Academy was opened as a boarding school for girls in 1912. In 1969, all 7th and 8th grade students at Catholic elementary schools were consolidated at Edmund Fitzgerald Middle School in Mankato. Loyola High School moved to its current campus on Good Counsel Hill in 1982 after Good Counsel Academy closed two years earlier. All schools incorporated together in 1990, and this organization was named Loyola Catholic School in 2006. In 2005, all students in grade 4 and grade 5 were moved to the Fitzgerald campus to join grades 6-8 who were already at that campus. In 2017, Loyola closed the Fitzgerald Campus and moved all students to the Good Counsel Campus.

== Good Counsel Campus ==
The Good Counsel Campus is located on Good Counsel Hill in Mankato, Minnesota. The hill is located on the eastern side of Mankato, and the water tower on the Hill can be seen from most parts of town. The elementary part of the school is located in a wing of the building, while the high school occupies the rest of the building. There are about twenty students in each class. The curriculum of the school includes four years required of religion, mathematics and English and three years of social studies, and science. The curriculum also requires two years of foreign language (French and Spanish are offered). There are four Advanced Placement (AP) classes offered at Loyola Catholic School. They are AP Calculus, AP Biology, AP Government, and AP English. All of the AP courses offer students the chance to gain college credit. The high school also is a member of the Minnesota State High School League (MSHSL).

== Activities ==
The school won the 2009 Minnesota State Knowledge Bowl Meet, qualified for the 2008 State Meet and placed 5th at the 1999 State Meet. In 2009, Loyola produced the state champions of the Division A Minnesota State Knowledge Bowl Meet. Also, the school produces one three-act play in the fall, usually a musical. Past performances include "You're a Good Man, Charlie Brown", "Joseph and the Amazing Technicolor Dreamcoat," "Fiddler on the Roof", and other notable plays and musicals.

Athletics at Loyola are always competitive. Track and Field consistently sends athletes to the state meet annually. Their last appearance was in 2008 in the mile and two mile. In the mile the Loyola runners were seeded 1–2. Currently three Loyola Alumni are on active Division I NCAA Track and Cross Country rosters. Football's last appearance at state was in the first round of the 2007 season while boys' basketball last state qualifying season was the 2022–2023 season. In the 2002–2003 season the boys' basketball team set a state record for the best record all time at 32–0; two players from that team played Division I college basketball. Bret Brielmaier played for the University of Arizona and Tyler Westman played for South Dakota followed by Saint John's University (Collegeville, MN). The girls' basketball team's last appearance in the state tournament was during the 2013–2014 season; making it for a second season in a row. The girls' softball team's most recent appearance at the state tournament was in 2016; winning Section 2A for a second straight season.

The school has produced one professional athlete. Ben Brielmaier was signed by the Cleveland Browns as an undrafted free agent, and played in several leagues including NFL-Europa with the Frankfurt Galaxy, the CFL, and the UFL.

Athletics include:
Boys Fall:
Football (co-op with St. Clair High School)
Soccer (co-op with Lake Crystal High School)
Cross-Country (co-op with Cleveland High School)
Girls Fall:
Volleyball
Soccer (co-op with Lake Crystal High School)
Cross-Country (co-op with Cleveland High School)
Swimming/Diving (co-op with East High School)
Tennis (co-op with East High School)

Boys Winter:
Basketball
Hockey (co-op with East High School)
Swimming/Diving (co-op with East High School)
Skiing (co-op with East and West High Schools)
Wrestling (co-op with St. Clair High School)
Girls Winter:
Basketball
Dance Team
Hockey (co-op with East High School)
Skiing (co-op with East and West High Schools)
Gymnastics (co-op with West High School)

Boys Spring:
Baseball
Track and Field (co-op with Cleveland High School)
Tennis (co-op with East High School)
Girls Spring:
Softball
Track and Field (co-op with Cleveland High School)

== Name ==
Before the 2005–06 school year, the school board changed the name from Mankato Area Catholic Schools, which was a district controlling Loyola High School, Fitzgerald Middle School, Holy Rosary Intermediate School, and Notre Dame Elementary, to Mankato Area Catholic School, which combined all of these into one school. In December 2005, the board changed the name of the school again to Loyola Catholic School because they wanted to have Catholic in the name of every school. The high school is most commonly called Loyola.

The original Loyola High School was located next to Ss. Peter and Paul Catholic Church in Mankato, which had been founded by Jesuits. The school was named for Saint Ignatius of Loyola. The Fitzgerald Middle school currently is located near the Ss Peter and Paul Catholic Church. The Good Counsel Academy was located on Good Counsel Hill, the location for the School Sisters of Notre Dame mother house for the province of Mankato. The academy closed in 1980. The Loyola High school moved to the Good Counsel Hill location.

== Notable alumni ==
- John Bessler, author
- Ben Brielmaier, former offensive lineman for the Las Vegas Locomotives
- Bret Brielmaier, assistant coach for the Orlando Magic
- William (Bill) Bresnan, Founder Bresnan Communications
