= Zolezzi =

Zolezzi is a Spanish surname, often found in Chile. Notable people with the surname include:

- Alfredo Zolezzi (born 1958), Chilean industrial designer and inventor
- Giancarlo Zolezzi (born 1981), Chilean freestyle swimmer
- Juan Manuel Zolezzi (born 1952), Chilean engineer, rector of the University of Santiago, Chile (2006–2022)
- Óscar Zolezzi (1925–2019), Argentine rower
