= Haarsma =

Haarsma is a surname. Notable people with the surname include:

- Frans Haarsma (1921–2009), Roman Catholic priest
- PJ Haarsma (born 1964), Canadian producer and science fiction author
- Sietze Haarsma (1926–2017), Dutch rower
