= Bartesaghi =

Bartesaghi is an Italian surname. Notable people with the surname include:

- Davide Bartesaghi (born 2005), Italian footballer
- Luigi Bartesaghi (1932-2022), Canadian cyclist
