= Rowing at the 1948 Summer Olympics – Men's coxless four =

Men's coxless four at the Games of the XIV Olympiad
- Date: 5–9 August 1948
- Competitors: 40 from 10 nations

Medalists
1st place, gold medalist(s)		Giuseppe Moioli; Elio Morille; Giovanni Invernizzi; Franco Faggi	Italy
2nd place, silver medalist(s)		Helge Halkjær; Aksel Bonde; Helge Muxoll Schrøder; Ib Storm Larsen	Denmark
3rd place, bronze medalist(s)		Fred Kingsbury; Stu Griffing; Greg Gates; Robert Perew	United States

The men's coxless four competition at the 1948 Summer Olympics in London took place at Henley-on-Thames, London.

== Results ==
The following rowers took part:

Rank	Rowers	Country
1st place, gold medalist(s)	Giuseppe Moioli; Elio Morille; Giovanni Invernizzi; Franco Faggi	Italy
2nd place, silver medalist(s)	Helge Halkjær; Aksel Bonde; Helge Muxoll Schrøder; Ib Storm Larsen	Denmark
3rd place, bronze medalist(s)	Fred Kingsbury; Stu Griffing; Greg Gates; Robert Perew	United States
	Hein van Suylekom; Sietze Haarsma; Han Dekker; Han van den Berg	Netherlands
	Peter Kirkpatrick; Hank Rushmere; Tom Christie; Tony Butcher	Great Britain
	Edgar Ramsay; Austin Ikin; Des Maybery; Claude Kietzman	South Africa
	Julio Curatella; Alberto Madero; Óscar Zolezzi; Óscar Almirón	Argentina
	Václav Roubík; Josef Kalaš; Josef Schejbal; Jiří Vaněk	Czechoslovakia
	Petar Ozretić; Ivo Lipanović; Mate Mojtić; Klement Alujević	Yugoslavia
	Miklós Zágon; Lajos Nagy; Tibor Nádas; József Sátori	Hungary
