= Franco Faggi =

Italian rower (1926–2016)

Personal information
- Born: 8 March 1926 Perledo, Italy
- Died: 12 June 2016 (aged 90) Perledo, Italy

Sport
- Sport: Rowing
- Club: Canottieri Moto Guzzi
Medal record
Men's rowing
Representing Italy
Olympic Games
Gold medal – first place	1948 London	Coxless four
European Rowing Championships
Gold medal – first place	1947 Lucerne	Coxless four
Gold medal – first place	1949 Amsterdam	Coxless four
Gold medal – first place	1950 Milan	Coxless four

Francesco Faggi (8 March 1926 – 12 June 2016) was an Italian rower who competed in the 1948 Summer Olympics and in the 1952 Summer Olympics.

== Biography ==
Faggi was born in Perledo in 1926. A worker at the Italian motorbike manufacturer Moto Guzzi based at their plant in Mandello del Lario, he became a member of the company's rowing team, Canottieri Moto Guzzi. A coxless four was formed with Giuseppe Moioli, Elio Morille, Giovanni Invernizzi, and Faggi. The first time they left their home training ground, Lake Como, was when they travelled to the 1947 European Rowing Championships in Lucerne, Switzerland. Little known in rowing circles, they unexpectedly won the gold medal in their boat class. The four were to dominate this boat class until 1952, continuously winning all races they rowed including all heats. In 1948 he was a crew member of the Italian boat which won the gold medal in the coxless fours event. Four years later he was eliminated with the Italian boat in the semi-final repechage of the coxless four competition.

Faggi died in Perledo on 12 June 2016, at the age of 90.
