= Elio Morille =

Italian rower

Personal information
- Born: 7 September 1927 Alessandria
- Died: 21 June 1998 (aged 70) Rome

Sport
- Sport: Rowing
- Club: Canottieri Moto Guzzi
Medal record
Men's rowing
Representing Italy
Olympic Games
| Gold medal – first place | 1948 London | Coxless four |
European Rowing Championships
| Gold medal – first place | 1947 Lucerne | Coxless four |
| Gold medal – first place | 1949 Amsterdam | Coxless four |
| Gold medal – first place | 1950 Milan | Coxless four |

Elio Morille (7 September 1927 – 21 June 1998) was an Italian rower who competed in the 1948 Summer Olympics and in the 1952 Summer Olympics.

He was born in Alessandria in 1927. A worker at the Italian motorbike manufacturer Moto Guzzi based at their plant in Mandello del Lario, he became a member of the company's rowing team, Canottieri Moto Guzzi. A coxless four was formed with Giuseppe Moioli, Morille, Giovanni Invernizzi, and Franco Faggi. The first time they left their home training ground, Lake Como, was when they travelled to the 1947 European Rowing Championships in Lucerne, Switzerland. Little known in rowing circles, they unexpectedly won the gold medal in their boat class. The four were to dominate this boat class until 1952, continuously winning all races they rowed including all heats. In 1948 he was a crew member of the Italian boat which won the gold medal in the coxless fours event. Four years later he was eliminated with the Italian boat in the semi-final repêchage of the coxless four competition.

He died in Rome in 1998.
