= Jiří Vaněk (rower) =

Czech rower

Personal information
- Nationality: Czech

Sport
- Sport: Rowing

Jiří Vaněk was a Czech rower. He competed in the men's coxless four event at the 1948 Summer Olympics.
