= Ivo Lipanović =

Croatian rower (1928–2019)

Ivo Lipanović (29 September 1928 – 30 July 2019) was a Croatian rower who competed for Yugoslavia in the 1948 Olympic Games in the coxless four event. Born in Split, he was a member of swimming club Jadran Split. With the death of Željko Čajkovski on 11 November 2016, he had been one of the four living Croatian athletes from the 1948 Olympics (the others being: Alma Butia, Vanja Ilić and Miroslav Dubravčić, who was a reserve in rowing).
