= Johnnie Turner (Tennessee politician) =

American politician

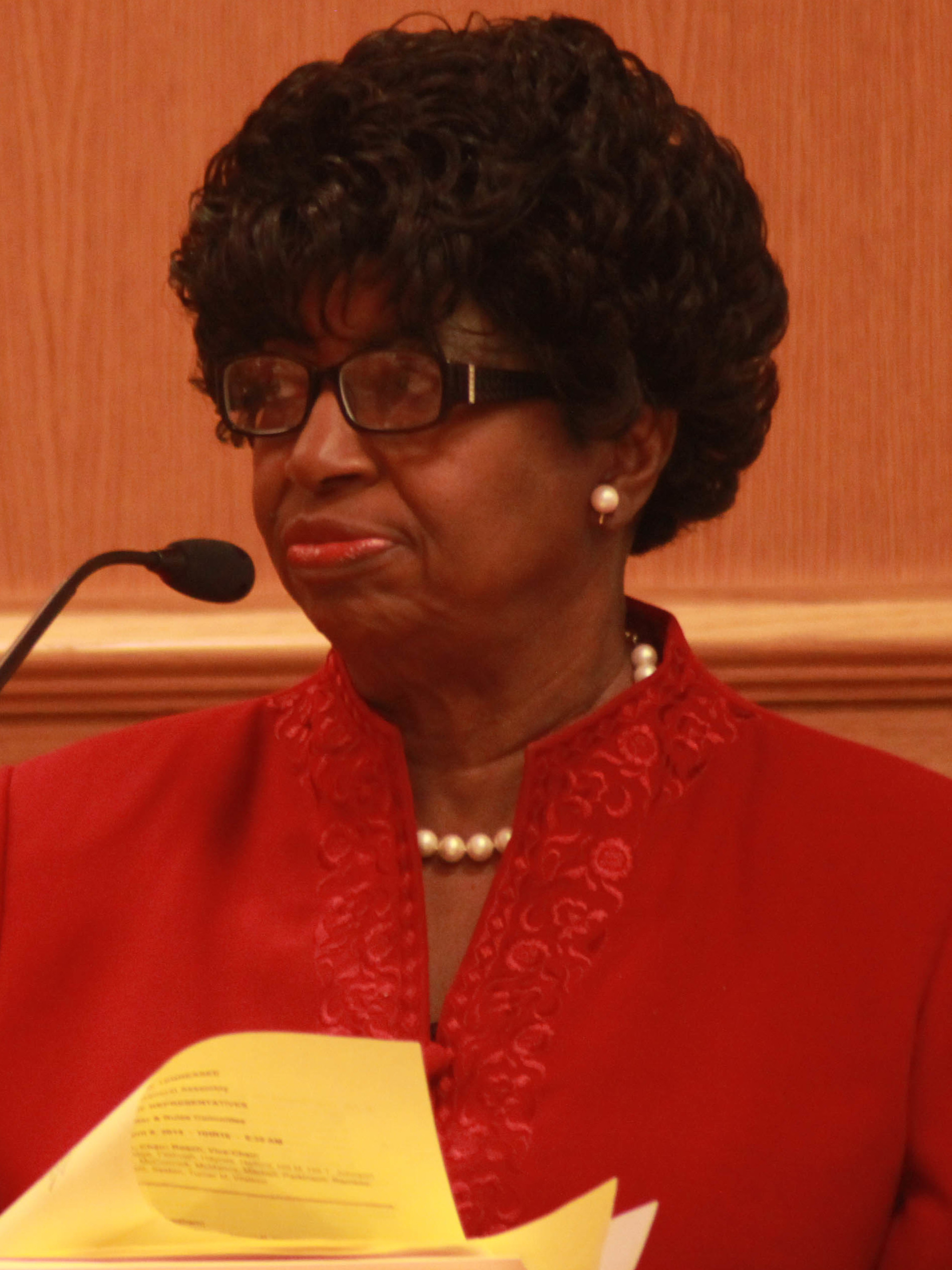
- Turner in 2014

Member of the Tennessee House of Representatives from the 85th district
- In office January 11, 2010 – January 8, 2019
- Preceded by: Larry Turner
- Succeeded by: Jesse Chism

Personal details
- Party: Democratic
- Spouse: Larry Turner (died 2009)
- Children: 1
- Education: LeMoyne–Owen College (BS); University of Memphis (MEd); University of Tennessee
- Website: House website

Johnnie R. Turner is an American politician. She is a Democrat who represented District 85 in the Tennessee House of Representatives from January 11, 2010, when she succeeded her husband, Representative Larry Turner, until 2018, when she decided not to seek another term.

== Education ==
Turner earned her BS from LeMoyne–Owen College, attended post-graduate studies at the University of Tennessee, and earned her MEd from the University of Memphis.

== Elections ==
- 2012 Turner was challenged in the August 2, 2012 Democratic Primary, winning with 5,442 votes (78.6%), and was unopposed for the November 6, 2012 General election, winning with 22,690 votes.
- 2010 Turner was challenged in the August 5, 2010 Democratic Primary, winning with 6,790 votes (64.6%), and won the November 2, 2010 General election with 14,674 votes (87.6%) against Republican nominee Edgar Babian.
