= Petar Ozretić =

Croatian rower

Personal information
- Nationality: Croatian
- Born: 27 February 1920; Split, Kingdom of Serbs, Croats, and Slovenes
- Died: 30 November 1996 (aged 76); Split, Croatia

Sport
- Sport: Rowing

Petar Ozretić (27 February 1920 – 30 November 1996) was a Croatian rower. He competed in the men's coxless four event at the 1948 Summer Olympics.
