= Mate Mojtić =

Croatian rower

Personal information
- Nationality: Croatian
- Born: 22 January 1914; Split, Austria-Hungary
- Died: 2 February 1995 (aged 81); Split, Croatia

Sport
- Sport: Rowing

Mate Mojtić (22 January 1914 – 2 February 1995) was a Croatian rower. He competed in the men's coxless four event at the 1948 Summer Olympics.
