= Sanctuary of Beata Vergine del Fiume =

Church building complex in Mandello del Lario, Italy

Religion
- Affiliation: Roman Catholic
- Province: Lecco, Diocese of Mantua
- Status: Active

Location
- Location: Mandello del Lario, Italy
- Interactive map of Sanctuary of Beata Vergine del Fiume
- Coordinates: 45.915454°N 9.31743°E

Architecture
- Type: Church
- Style: Baroque

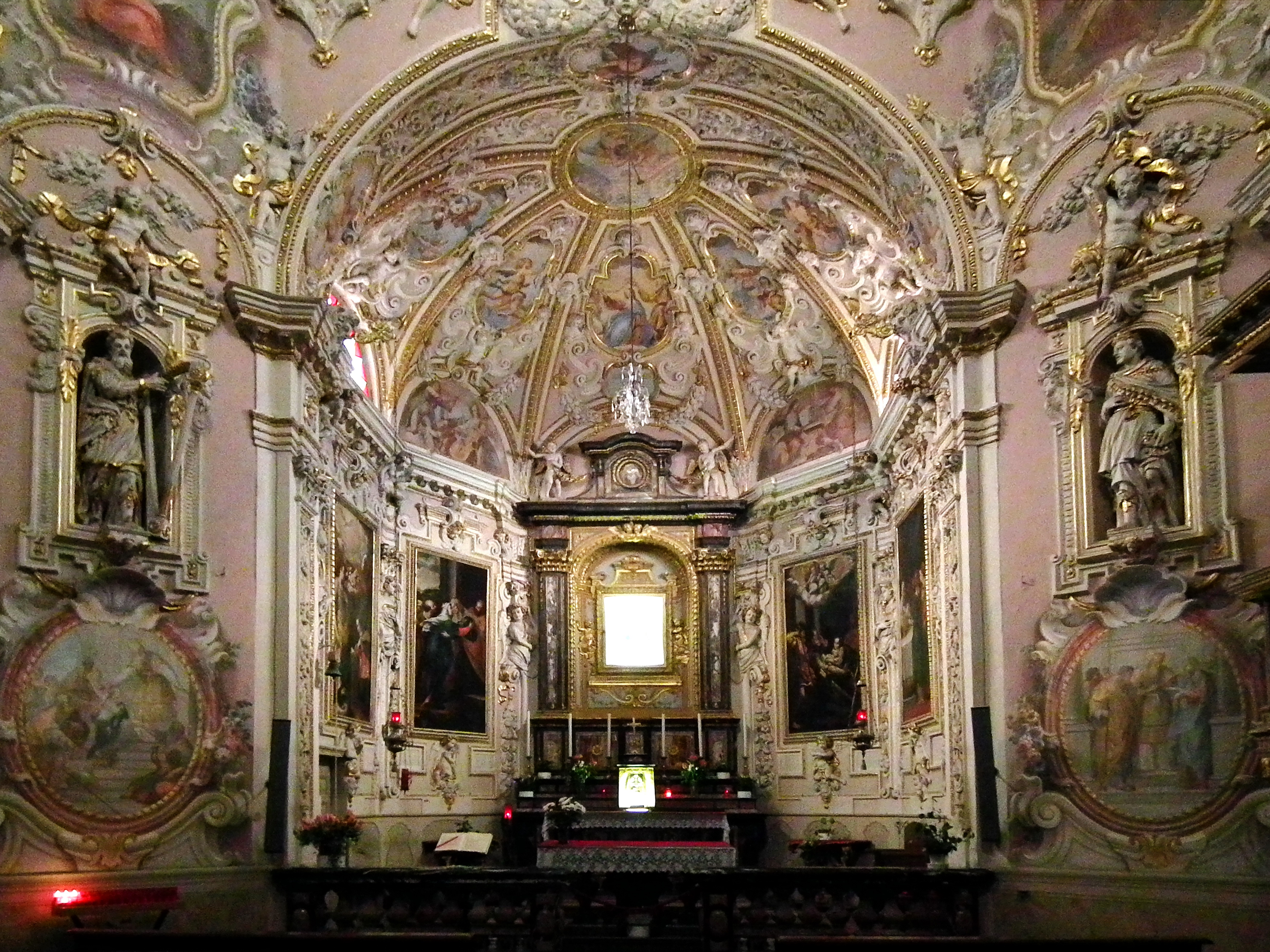
The main altar.

Sanctuary of Beata Vergine del Fiume (Italian: Santuario della Beata Vergine del Fiume) is a Roman Catholic church in the town of Mandello del Lario, in the Lecco and the region of Lombardy, Italy. Built during the 17th century, construction was completed in 1732.

== See also ==
- Catholic Church in Italy
