= Madison Lake (Minnesota) =

Lake in the state of Minnesota, United States

- Location within Minnesota
- Location: Blue Earth County, Minnesota
- Coordinates: 44°11′15″N 93°48′45″W
- Type: lake
- Basin countries: United States
- Surface area: 1,446 acres (5.85 km^{2})
- Max. depth: 59 ft (18 m)
- Shore length^{1}: 12 mi (19 km)
- Surface elevation: 1,017 ft (310 m)
- Islands: 0
- Settlements: 0
- ^{1} Shore length is not a well-defined measure.

Madison Lake (sometimes styled Lake Madison in publications up to the early part of the 20th century) is a lake in Blue Earth County, Minnesota, United States. The lake covers an area of 1,446 acres (5.85 km^{2}) and is 59 feet (18 m) deep at its deepest point. It is named after President James Madison The city of Madison Lake, Minnesota is located on the Northwest shoreline of the lake. The lake and the Point Pleasant resort have been long-noted fishing destinations. Madison Lake is part of the Le Sueur River watershed.

== Ice Out Data ==
Madison Lake is notable in that reliable climatology data has been maintained for the last ice or "Ice Out" on the lake since 1927. Data was recorded on a nearby barn from 1927 to 1940 Frank McCabe measured from 1940 to 1977. Local residents Mary and Dennis Buschkowsky measured diligently from 1977 through 2018 The Buschkowskys' nephew, Steve Schoeb, continues to monitor starting in 2019. The earliest ice-out recorded on the lake was March 8, 2000. The latest was April 30, 2018. The median ice out date as of 2020 is computed as April 5 or April 6.

== Minnesota Governor's Fishing Opener 2023 ==
Minnesota Governor Tim Walz visited Madison Lake for the 2023 fishing opener on June 20, 2023. The Governor's attendance had been delayed due to a scheduling conflict with his daughter's college graduation from the original May 12 weekend. Minnesota Lieutenant Governor Peggy Flanagan was the "fishing leader" for the season 2023 opener. The Minnesota Governor's Fishing Opener is a tradition that dates back to 1948. This was the 75th anniversary of the tradition. The location had been announced in August 2022.
