= Bret Brielmaier =

American basketball coach (born 1985)

New Orleans Pelicans
- Title: Assistant coach
- League: NBA

Personal information
- Born: November 28, 1985 (age 40) Mankato, Minnesota, U.S.
- Listed height: 6 ft 7 in (2.01 m)
- Listed weight: 205 lb (93 kg)

Career information
- High school: Loyola (Mankato, Minnesota)
- College: Arizona (2004–2008)
- NBA draft: 2008: undrafted
- Position: Forward
- Coaching career: 2013–present

Career history

Coaching
- 2013–2016: Cleveland Cavaliers (assistant)
- 2016–2020: Brooklyn Nets (assistant)
- 2020–2021: Long Island Nets
- 2021–2026: Orlando Magic (assistant)
- 2026–present: New Orleans Pelicans (assistant)

Career highlights
- As assistant coach: NBA champion (2016)

Bret Michael Brielmaier (/ˈbriːlmaɪər/ BREEL-mire; born November 28, 1985) is an American professional basketball coach who is an assistant coach for the New Orleans Pelicans of the National Basketball Association (NBA).

He was raised in Mankato, Minnesota, and attended Loyola Catholic School. Brielmaier played college basketball for the Arizona Wildcats from 2004 to 2008 in primarily a reserve role. He began his coaching career as an undergraduate assistant for interim Wildcats head coach Russ Pennell during the 2008–09 season. Brielmaier joined the San Antonio Spurs of the NBA as a workout coach in 2009 and was promoted to a video coordinator in 2010. He joined the Cleveland Cavaliers as an assistant coach in 2013 and won an NBA championship with the Cavaliers in 2016.

On July 5, 2016, Brielmaier was hired by the Brooklyn Nets as an assistant coach. In 2020, he was named the head coach of the Nets' NBA G League affiliate, the Long Island Nets. He was replaced as the Long Island Nets coach after one season and a 7–8 record.

On August 8, 2021, Brielmaier was hired by the Orlando Magic as an assistant coach.

During the 2023 FIBA Basketball World Cup he was assistant coach for Team Germany under Head Coach Gordon Herbert, winning the gold medal.
