= Good Counsel Hill =

Coordinates: 44°10′53.6″N 93°58′44″W

Good Counsel Hill is a notable location in Mankato, Minnesota. This hill is located off US Highway 14 and is home to Loyola Catholic School and a motherhouse for the School Sisters of Notre Dame, who arrived in Mankato in 1865. It's easy to find because of its location just off the freeway, and because of the water tower located on the top of the hill.
