= Han Dekker =

Dutch rower

Personal information
- Nationality: Dutch
- Born: 4 June 1913; Delft, Netherlands
- Died: 20 January 2000 (aged 86); Zeist, Netherlands

Sport
- Sport: Rowing

Johannes Adriaan Dekker (4 June 1913 – 20 January 2000) was a Dutch rower. He competed in the men's coxless four event at the 1948 Summer Olympics.
