= Giuseppe Moioli =

Italian rower (1927–2025)

Personal information
- Born: 8 August 1927 Mandello del Lario, Italy
- Died: 5 May 2025 (aged 97) Mandello del Lario, Italy

Sport
- Sport: Rowing
- Club: Canottieri Moto Guzzi
Medal record
Men's rowing
Representing Italy
Olympic Games
Gold medal – first place	1948 London	Coxless four
European Rowing Championships
Gold medal – first place	1947 Lucerne	Coxless four
Gold medal – first place	1949 Amsterdam	Coxless four
Gold medal – first place	1950 Milan	Coxless four
Gold medal – first place	1954 Amsterdam	Coxless four
Gold medal – first place	1956 Bled	Coxless four
Gold medal – first place	1958 Poznań	Eight

Giuseppe Moioli (8 August 1927 – 5 May 2025) was an Italian rower who competed in the 1948 Summer Olympics, in the 1952 Summer Olympics, and in the 1956 Summer Olympics.

== Biography ==
Moioli was born in Olcio di Mandello Lario in 1927. A worker at the Italian motorbike manufacturer Moto Guzzi based at their plant in Mandello del Lario, he became a member of the company's rowing team, Canottieri Moto Guzzi. A coxless four was formed with Moioli, Elio Morille, Giovanni Invernizzi, and Franco Faggi. The first time they left their home training ground, Lake Como, was when they travelled to the 1947 European Rowing Championships in Lucerne, Switzerland. Little known in rowing circles, they unexpectedly won the gold medal in their boat class. The four were to dominate this boat class until 1952, continuously winning all races they rowed including all heats. In 1948, he was a crew member of the Italian boat which won the gold medal in the coxless fours event. Four years later, he was eliminated with the Italian boat in the semi-final repechage of the coxless four competition. At the 1956 Games, he was part of the Italian boat which finished fourth in the coxless four event.

Moioli died on 5 May 2025, at the age of 97.
