= Ben Brielmaier =

American gridiron football player (born 1983)

Profile
- Position: Offensive tackle

Personal information
- Born: October 24, 1983 (age 43); Mankato, Minnesota, U.S.
- Listed height: 6 ft 4 in (1.93 m)
- Listed weight: 315 lb (143 kg)

Career information
- College: Princeton
- NFL draft: 2006: undrafted

Career history
- Cleveland Browns (2006)*; Frankfurt Galaxy (2007); Toronto Argonauts (2008)*; Las Vegas Locomotives (2009)*
- * Offseason or practice squad member only

Ben Brielmaier (born October 24, 1983) is an American former football offensive tackle. He was signed by the Cleveland Browns as an undrafted free agent in 2006. He played college football at Princeton.

He was also a member of the Frankfurt Galaxy, Toronto Argonauts, and Las Vegas Locomotives.

== Early life ==
Brielmaier played high school football at Loyola Catholic School in Mankato, Minnesota.

== College career ==
Ben attended Princeton University, graduating in 2006 with a BSE (Bachelor of Science in engineering) in Electrical Engineering. His focus and specialty was Solid State Devices.

== Professional career ==
=== Cleveland Browns ===
Brielmaier signed as an undrafted free agent with the Cleveland Browns of the NFL on May 8, 2006. He was released on July 30.

=== Frankfurt Galaxy ===
Brielmaier signed as a free agent with the Frankfurt Galaxy of NFL Europa and played in every game of the 2007 season.

=== Toronto Argonauts ===
Brielmaier signed with the Toronto Argonauts of the Canadian Football League on April 10, 2008. He was released during training camp on June 14.
