= Aksel Bonde =

Danish rower (1918–1996)

Personal information
- Born: 29 May 1918 Horne, Faaborg-Midtfyn Municipality
- Died: 27 May 1996 (aged 77) Horsens

Sport
- Sport: Rowing
Medal record
Men's rowing
Representing Denmark
Olympic Games
Silver medal – second place	1948 London	Coxless four
European Rowing Championships
Silver medal – second place	1950 Milan	Eight

Aksel Bonde Hansen (née Bonde, 29 May 1918 – 27 May 1996) was a Danish rower who competed in the 1948 Summer Olympics. He was born in Horne, Faaborg-Midtfyn Municipality. In 1948 he was a crew member of the Danish boat which won the silver medal in the coxless fours event. He died in 1996 in Horsens.
