= Attilio Cantoni =

Italian rower

Personal information
- Born: 2 May 1931 Mandello del Lario, Italy
- Died: 22 August 2017 (aged 86)
- Height: 182 cm (6 ft 0 in)
- Weight: 80 kg (176 lb)

Sport
- Sport: Rowing
Medal record
Men's rowing
Representing Italy
European Rowing Championships
Gold medal – first place	1954 Bosbaan	Coxless four
Gold medal – first place	1956 Bled	Coxless four
Gold medal – first place	1957 Duisburg	Eight
Gold medal – first place	1958 Poznań	Eight

Attilio Cantoni (2 May 1931 – 22 August 2017) was an Italian rower. He competed at the 1956 Summer Olympics in Melbourne with the men's coxless four where they came fourth.
