= Émile Vanfasse =

Émile Vanfasse (1939 or 1940 - Mamao, 22 November 2009) was a French Polynesia politician and civil servant. Vanfasse served as the finance minister of French Polynesia for two nonconsecutive terms beginning in 2004 and 2005.

Vanfasse was a career civil servant before entering politics in French Polynesia. He worked as a chief inspector for the French Audit Office before his retirement. Vanfasse first entered politics as a member of the Fetia Api, a French Polynesian political party which favors autonomy from France.

He served as Finance Minister in two separate governments under then President Oscar Temaru. Vanfasse first became Finance Minister in Temaru's government in June 2004, and was reappointed finance minister again in March 2005 when Temaru returned to power. He resigned as Finance Minister in April 2006 for health reasons, and his financial duties were succeeded by French Polynesian Vice President Jacqui Drollet.

In February 2009, Vanfasse became a special adviser to President Oscar Temaru after Temaru was returned to power in the first 2009 presidential election.

Emile Vanfasse died on 22 November 2009 in French Polynesia. Then President Oscar Temaru called Vanfasse, "someone whose only concern was serving the general interest of French Polynesia" at the time.
