= Stu Griffing =

American rower (1926–2021)

Personal information
- Full name: Stuart Lane Griffing
- Born: November 9, 1926 New Haven, Connecticut, U.S.
- Died: December 20, 2021 (aged 95) Cincinnati, Ohio, U.S.
Medal record
Men's rowing
Representing United States
Olympic Games
Bronze medal – third place	1948 London	Coxless four

Stuart Lane Griffing (November 9, 1926 – December 20, 2021) was an American rower who competed in the 1948 Summer Olympics. He was born in New Haven, Connecticut. In 1948 he was a crew member of the American boat which won the bronze medal in the coxless fours event. Griffing died in Cincinnati, Ohio on December 20, 2021, at the age of 95.
