= Óscar Zolezzi =

Argentine rower (1925–2019)

Personal information
- Nationality: Argentine
- Born: 4 February 1925
- Died: 30 June 2019 (aged 94)

Sport
- Sport: Rowing

Óscar Zolezzi (4 February 1925 – 30 June 2019) was an Argentine rower. He competed in the men's coxless four event at the 1948 Summer Olympics.
