= Austin Ikin =

South African rower

Personal information
- Nationality: South African
- Born: 27 July 1930
- Died: 20 November 2013 (aged 83); Durban, South Africa

Sport
- Sport: Rowing

Austin Ikin (27 July 1930 – 20 November 2013) was a South African rower. He competed in the men's coxless four event at the 1948 Summer Olympics.
