= Glenn Remick =

American darts player (1951–2009)

Personal information
- Full name: Glenn Wellington Remick
- Born: January 21, 1951 St. Johnsbury, Vermont, U.S.
- Died: November 2, 2009 (aged 58) St. Louis, Missouri, U.S.

Sport
- Sport: Darts
- Playing since: 1971
- Laterality: Right-handed

Organisation (see split in darts)
- BDO: 1980–1990

Glenn Wellington Remick (January 21, 1951 – November 2, 2009) was an American professional darts player. He founded a number of darting organizations in the United States, including the New England Darts Tournament Organization in 1980 and the American Darters Association in St. Louis, Missouri, in 1990. Remick continued to serve as president and chief executive of the American Darters Association until his death in 2009.

Remick was elected the head of the US World Cup Team. He led the U.S. World Cup dart team to a second-place finish at the championships in Brisbane, Australia, in 1985.

In 2002, Remick was inducted into the National Darts Hall of Fame of Clarksburg, West Virginia, for his contributions to the sport of darts.

Remick died of amyloidosis at Missouri Baptist Medical Center in St. Louis on November 2, 2009, at the age of 58. He was a resident of Foristell, Missouri, at the time of his death. He was survived by his wife of 34 years, Gloria Deneault, whom he had met on a blind date in Greenfield, Massachusetts, as well as a sons, Karl, Mark, and daughter, Sarah Coyne.
