= Claude Kietzman =

South African rower (1918–1989)

Personal information
- Nationality: South African
- Born: 7 June 1918
- Died: 18 August 1989 (aged 71)

Sport
- Sport: Rowing

Claude Kietzman (7 June 1918 – 18 August 1989) was a South African rower. He competed in the men's coxless four event at the 1948 Summer Olympics.
