= Mamao =

Mamao is a given name and a surname. Notable people with the name include:

== Given name ==
- Mamao Keneseli, Tuvaluan activist and teacher

== Surname ==
- Abdullah Mamao, Filipino government official
- Felipe Mamão (born 1985), Brazilian former professional association football player
