= Alfredo Zolezzi =

Chilean industrial designer and inventor

Alfredo Zolezzi-Garretón (born December 12, 1958), is a Chilean industrial designer and inventor, dedicated to applied science and creator of the Integrated Objectives Model, which links social and technological innovation with new business models, to address social and environmental problems. This connection is what Zolezzi has called "Innovation with Purpose".

Zolezzi is Founder and Chief Innovation Officer of AIC Technologies LLC (AIC), a private initiative dedicated to the development of new technologies that provide solutions with technical and economic impact for multiple industries. He is also president of the Alfredo Zolezzi Foundation (AZF), a non-profit organization dedicated to promote and facilitate projects that connect science and technology with poverty, social unrest, climate change, corporate sustainability and others. Currently, the AIC laboratories and AZF offices are located in Concón, Chile.

== History ==
Zolezzi was born on December 12, 1958, in Santiago de Chile. His family settled in the city of Viña del Mar, where he attended his elementary and secondary school at Mackay School. Later, he enrolled at the Pontificia Universidad Católica de Valparaíso (Chile) where he graduated as an industrial designer.

In 2003, he led the Hydrocarbon Acoustic Stimulation (RMS) development, technology which increases the efficiency of oil extraction and recovery, through sound and ultrasound. The preliminary concepts were tested with the participation and support of the Department of Energy of the United States (US-DOE-CRADA).

Later, Zolezzi decided to follow his own path and, in 2010, founded the Advanced Innovation Center (today AIC Technologies) In addition, he conceives and creates his own innovation model – The Integrated Objectives Model – which seeks to enable the development of high impact technologies that address some of the greatest challenges facing humanity today.

In the year 2011, following the model, the AIC team, created the Plasma Water Sanitation System (PWSS), a technology that eliminates viruses and bacteria in contaminated water through non-thermal plasma.

Currently, AIC leads a team of experts in physics, chemistry, plasma, electromagnetism and industrial design, working on a range of projects based on advanced technology and new business models, which seek to solve the problems that today affect the sustainability of large corporations, addressing the needs of the most vulnerable people.
