= Greg Gates =

American rower (1926–2020)

Personal information
- Full name: Gregory Crozier Gates
- Born: April 28, 1926 Montclair, New Jersey, U.S.
- Died: January 9, 2020 (aged 93) Fredericksburg, Texas, U.S.
Medal record
Men's rowing
Representing United States
Olympic Games
Bronze medal – third place	1948 London	Coxless four

Gregory Crozier Gates (April 28, 1926 – January 9, 2020) was an American rower who competed in the 1948 Summer Olympics. He was born in Montclair, New Jersey. In 1948 he was a crew member of the American boat which won the bronze medal in the coxless fours event. He graduated from Yale College and Harvard Business School.
