= Edgar Ramsay =

South African rower (1914–1966)

Personal information
- Full name: Edgar St. John Linton Ramsay
- Nationality: South African
- Born: 20 October 1914 England
- Died: 4 September 1966 (aged 51) Port Shepstone, South Africa

Sport
- Sport: Rowing

Edgar St. John Linton Ramsay (20 October 1914 – 4 September 1966) was a South African rower. He competed in the men's coxless four event at the 1948 Summer Olympics. Ramsay died in Port Shepstone, South Africa on 4 September 1966, at the age of 51.
