= Larry Turner (politician) =

American politician

Member of the Tennessee House of Representatives from the 85th district
- In office January 8, 1985 – November 27, 2009
- Preceded by: Teddy Withers
- Succeeded by: Johnnie Turner

Personal details
- Born: January 16, 1939 West Memphis, Arkansas, U.S.
- Died: November 27, 2009 (aged 70) Memphis, Tennessee, U.S.
- Resting place: West Tennessee Veterans Cemetery
- Party: Democratic
- Spouse: Johnnie
- Website: House website

Military service
- Allegiance: United States
- Branch/service: United States Air Force

Larry Turner (January 16, 1939 – November 27, 2009) was an American politician. He served as a Democratic member of the Tennessee House of Representatives from 1985 until his death. He represented the 85th district, which is composed of part of Shelby County.

== Early life ==
Turner was born in 1939 in West Memphis, Arkansas. He graduated from Memphis State University with a Bachelor of Science degree in Accounting and Real Estate. He was the owner of the Larry Turner and Associates Realty Company. He was also a veteran of the U.S. Air Force.

== Career ==
Turner was a member of the Consumer and Employee Affairs Committee, the House Education Committee, the House K-12 Subcommittee, the House Consumer Affairs Subcommittee, the House Employee Affairs Subcommittee, and the Joint TACIR Committee. Turner was also the Secretary of the House Democratic Caucus. He is a former chairman of the Shelby County Delegation.

== Death ==
Turner died November 27, 2009, at Methodist University Hospital following a short, unexpected illness and laid to rest at West Tennessee Veterans Cemetery in Memphis, Tennessee.
