= Peter Armstrong (priest) =

American Roman Catholic priest

Monsignor Peter Armstrong

Orders
- Ordination: June 11, 1954

Personal details
- Born: Peter Gomez Armstrong; April 9, 1929 San Francisco, California, U.S.
- Died: November 17, 2009 (aged 80) San Rafael, California, U.S.
- Education: Saint Patrick's Seminary and University; The Catholic University of America (MSW)

Peter Gomez Armstrong (April 9, 1929 – November 17, 2009), aka The Pigskin Priest, was an American Roman Catholic priest incardinated in the Archdiocese of San Francisco. He served as the chaplain for the San Francisco 49ers for all five of their Super Bowl victories. Armstrong was named a monsignor in the Catholic Church in 1966. He served in active ministry as a priest for 55 years before retiring in 2001 and held many civic and ministerial positions related to youth, sports, and social justice.

== Personal life ==
Armstrong was born in San Francisco, California. His father was a banker and his mother was a teacher. He said that he knew from a young age that he was called to be a priest. When he was in high school, he went on a religious retreat where he felt the call to the priesthood.

== Ministerial career ==
Armstrong attended Saint Patrick Seminary in Menlo Park. After being ordained on June 11, 1954, he was assigned to St. Pius Parish where he started a Teen Club. In 1959, he moved to Washington, D.C., to attend The Catholic University of America, where he earned a master's degree in social work. After graduating, he returned to San Francisco where he eventually became the head of the Catholic Youth Organization (1965). He served as the head of the CYO until 1979. In 1969, he was appointed as Director of Youth Activities of the Archdiocese of San Francisco.

In 1971, he became the President of the San Francisco Comprehensive Health Planning Council. In 1975, he became the Director of St. Vincent's School for Boys in San Rafael.

Armstrong grew up with San Francisco's mayor George Moscone. In 1976, Moscone asked Armstrong to serve on the city's Park and Recreation Commission. As a member of the commission, Armstrong convinced the 49ers owner, Eddie DeBartolo, to remove the artificial turf from Candlestick Park.

Armstrong also served as the chairman of the Social Justice Commission of the Archdiocese and the Archdiocesan Pastoral Planning Commission.

== NFL career ==
In 1977, Armstrong became the chaplain for the 49ers. Two years later, he returned to St. Pius where he served for the next 22 years until retiring in 2001. As both the chaplain for the 49ers and pastor for St. Pius, Armstrong had busy Sundays. If the 49ers were playing at home, he would officiate Mass at 8 am for the team and at 9:30 and 5:30 at his church. If the 49ers had an away game, he traveled with the team.

Armstrong met the owner of the 49ers when he was serving on San Francisco's Commission on Parks and Recreation. The owner hired Armstrong to serve as the team's chaplain. From 1977 to at least 2001, Armstrong led Mass before every game the 49ers played. Armstrong flew on the corporate jet and sat in the owner's box for every game. Bill Walsh said that Armstrong served the 49ers as more than just a priest, but as an adviser and counselor for the whole team regardless of one's religious beliefs. Walsh credits Armstrong with helping the team succeed.

As the chaplain for the 49ers, Armstrong played a key role in Walsh's conversion to Catholicism. He baptized Jerry Rice's children and officiated Joe Montana's, Dwight Clark's, and Ronnie Lott's marriages. As the team's official chaplain, the 49ers presented him with Super Bowl rings for each of their five championships.
