= Gopal Mishra =

Indian Odia-language writer (1933–2009)

- Born: 1933; Bidyadharpur, Cuttack, India
- Died: November 1, 2009 (aged 75–76); Bhubaneshwar
- Occupation(s): Journalist, columnist

Gopal Mishra (1933 – November 1, 2009) was an Indian journalist and columnist.

== Career ==
Born in Bidyadharpur, Cuttack, Orissa in 1933, Mishra's career spanned five decades, starting with the Oriya daily Prajatantra, followed by editorship of the English newspaper of the same group the Eastern Times.

He worked several years for the Amrita Bazar Patrika, a daily newspaper in Kolkata, as head of the News Bureau. After leaving them he became a freelance writer and settled in Bhubaneshwar. His columns and articles appeared in newspapers for leading Oriya daily `Sambad', 'Jhankara' and other publications.

A winner of several awards for his contribution to journalism, including like Narada Samman, Dr Mahatab Samman, Justice Raj Kishore Das Samman and Dr Radhanath Rath Samman, he was also the president of 'Utkal Sambadika Sangha', a union of working journalists and was the vice-president of Indian Federation of Working Journalists.

== Death ==
He died on November 1, 2009, at the age of 77 and was survived by his wife, four sons and a daughter
