= Roy Hendry Thomson =

Roy Hendry Thomson KStJ (27 August 1932 – 29 November 2009) was a Scottish businessman, public servant and political activist, based in Aberdeen.

== Early and personal life ==
Thomson attended Aberdeen Grammar School and gained an MA in psychology from the University of Aberdeen in 1955, later joining the British Psychological Society. He married Nancy in 1952 and they had three children. He attended national service in the Gordon Highlanders between 1955 and 1957. He was a Knight of the Order of St John and a deputy lieutenant of Aberdeen until August 2007. He also received an MLitt in 2009, writing his thesis on the contribution made by the Scottish Constitutional Convention to the re-establishment of the Scottish Parliament.

== Political activity ==
Thomson was a long-standing and senior member of the Scottish Liberal Democrats and, before that, the Scottish Liberal Party. He was an elected local councillor on Aberdeen District Council, later becoming the first Liberal Leader of the council. He also acted as the election agent for Malcolm Bruce MP in the Gordon constituency in 1979 and 1983. He was also active within the Party nationally, serving as both Convener (chairman) and later President of the Scottish Liberal Democrats. At the time of his death, he was (for the second time) serving as Scotland's representative on the Party's UK-wide Executive Committee.
