= Zev Aelony =

American activist (1938–2009)

- Born: February 21, 1938; Palo Alto, California; United States
- Died: November 1, 2009 (aged 71); Minneapolis, Minnesota; United States
- Education: University of Minnesota
- Occupation: Owned a small business representing electronic security manufacturers
- Known for: Organizer of Minnesota civil rights student group, Freedom Rider, CORE Soul Force member, one of the Americus Four who faced a death penalty for helping citizens legally vote
- Movement: Civil Rights Movement; Peace Movement
- Spouse: Karen Olson Aelony
- Children: Bjorn, Ephraim, Phill, Jared
- Parent(s): Janet and David Aelony
- Website: veganwolf.blogspot.com

Zev Aelony (February 21, 1938 – November 1, 2009) was an American activist involved in the civil rights movement. He was an organizer of the civil rights student group Students for Integration, a CORE Soul Force Member, a Freedom Rider, and one of the Americus Four who faced a death penalty for helping citizens legally vote.

== Early life and education ==
Zev Aelony was born on February 21, 1938, in Palo Alto, California, to Janet and David Aelony. His father, David Aelony, emigrated from Odessa in the Soviet Union to the United States in 1925, eventually earning his Ph.D. in Organic Chemistry at Stanford University, in 1938. His roommate at a kibbutz was an Arab Muslim. From that time, he championed equality for all ethnic groups in the state of Israel.

Aelony grew up in Minneapolis, Minnesota. He studied Russian and played football at University High School, from which he graduated in 1956. Aelony attended the University of Chicago for two years and then lived at the Kibbutz Shoval in Israel for a year. Upon his return to the United States, Aelony spent the summer of 1959 at Koinonia, a Christian community in southwest Georgia. He continued his education at the University of Minnesota, where he graduated in 1961 with a major in political theory and a minor in anthropology. He met his wife, Karen Olson, at the university. They were married for 43 years, until Aelony's death in 2009. They had four sons together: Bjorn, Ephraim, Phil, and Jared.

== Career ==
To support his family, Aelony and his wife owned a small business selling security products for commercial buildings. As a matter of principle, they did not sell any equipment designed to injure people, such as guns or knives. Aelony became an advocate for civil rights and social justice beginning in his teen years. From his earliest years he was an admirer of Mahatma Gandhi and non-violent resistance to injustice. At the University of Minnesota, he helped found Students for Integration, a group dedicated to gaining housing and employment for black and minority students. Aelony was arrested several times for testing the ban on segregated interstate travel in the Deep South as a Freedom Rider. He was famously arrested and served time on death row in Americus, Georgia, for attempting to register black voters.

Aelony has been described as a soft-spoken and peaceful man who practiced nonviolence and continued to fight for justice throughout his lifetime.

== Influences ==
=== Religion ===
The Aelony family was Jewish, which contributed to Zev Aelony's belief in peace and nonviolence. He lived at the Kibbutz Shoval in Israel from 1958 to 1959.

While there, he read an editorial about the communal Christian settlement Koinonia in Georgia which was founded by Clarence Jordan in 1942. At the time, Koinonia Farm gained notoriety as a target of racial bigotry, and was even bombed. Aelony spent the summer of 1959 in Koinonia working with and learning about the people there, who impressed him.

In addition to his native English language, he spoke Hebrew, German, and Russian. His German skills were put to the test in 1963 when the European press, many of whom did not speak English, descended on the CORE workers. His explanation to the press in German of what they were trying to accomplish was published widely in Europe and contributed to the pressure on Washington to uphold the Supreme Court ruling against discrimination in public transportation in interstate commerce.

=== Family ===
Aelony's father, David, was an immigrant and was involved in the opposition to the rise of Nazism in Germany, where he had relatives. He spoke fluent English, German, Hebrew, Yiddish, and French, and also knew parts of other Slavic and Germanic languages, as well as Spanish and Italian. David Aelony began welcoming refugees into his home when he met them on the streets.

One of the turning points in Zev Aelony's life occurred around the age of 18, when his family was invited to a Minneapolis picnic because of his father's work with the refugees. Jewish refugees from Europe and Japanese-Americans who had been in the internment camps out West attended the picnic. Aelony was shocked to meet kids who came out of those internment camps, as he believed things like that did not happen in the United States .

=== Experiences ===
Aelony was not completely naïve about segregation and first became involved in civil rights campaigns in high school. During this time in the mid-1950s, he participated in the distribution of NAACP postcards bearing the slogan "Completely Free by ’63," though to him this goal seemed too distant. The hatred Aelony witnessed towards the Koinonia community for practicing racial equality drove him towards participation in the civil rights movement. In September 1959, he attended a ten-day CORE training seminar in Miami, Florida. The seminar focused on nonviolence training and was attended by many people involved in the Freedom Rides, including Patricia Stephens Due and her sister Priscilla Stevens. The seminar was held at the Sir John Motel, one of the few places in Miami that allowed blacks and whites to stay together. The nonviolence training consisted of techniques in organizing and training, and also emphasized the need to understand the people who were against integration. Aelony came to believe that it was important to understand why people do things rather than just dividing them into categories of good and bad.

== Civil rights work ==
=== Students for Integration ===
Aelony worked with a group of students to help find housing for Persian students. This population had difficulty securing housing because it was rumored that they rubbed their skin with olive oil, which ruined the bedding. If the minority students were told an apartment complex was full, white students would go ask for a room there to test the fairness of the renters. The students would then talk to the renters, who were often embarrassed and would agree to rent to the minority students.

=== Freedom Rider ===
Meanwhile, the sit-in movement, which encouraged local student activism, began to spread throughout the nation, and Students for Integration organized support at the university. In the summer of 1961, there was a call for more Freedom Riders to help demonstrate the rights of all Americans to equal accommodation on public transportation as the law required.

Zev Aelony and five others, including Claire O’Conner, Gene Uphoff, Dave Martin, Marv Davidoff, and Bob Baum, set off on a bus journey with New Orleans as the final destination. The first part of the ride was uneventful, and the group did not experience any violence. They stopped in Nashville to stay at the Freedom House with Diane Nash and Rodney Powell, and they joined in a picket of a grocery store there. The Freedom Riders continued on their journey and were arrested when they arrived in Jackson, Mississippi. Police Chief Captain Ray met them inside the door of the black waiting room, and they were taken to the Jackson City Jail. After a couple of nights they were transferred to the Hines County Jail, and when that facility filled up they were moved to Mississippi's notorious Parchman Farm. While there, Aelony participated in a hunger strike with several others, and he was isolated for a period of time for writing "you’ll reap what you sow" on the back wall with a spoon. In retrospect, the federal government seemed slow to respond to the request from civil rights workers to enforce the interstate commerce clause decision by the supreme court, both for political reasons, for caution, and until international pressures arose to demonstrate US commitment to democracy, freedom of travel, and equality under the law. Aelony's interview in May 1963 in German with a West German filmmaker played extensively on TV in Europe, contributing immediately to the political pressure from Europe.

=== CORE Soul Force ===
In the spring of 1963, Aelony became a part of the Journey of Reconciliation. The Journey of Reconciliation began when William Moore, a white Mississippian postman whose wife was black, set off on foot from Chattanooga, Tennessee, to deliver a letter to Mississippi Governor Ross Barnett asking him to accept integration. When Moore was shot dead, five members of CORE and five members of SNCC responded to his wife's request that the journey be carried on. The group, an equal mix of black and white males, was arrested for "walking into the state of Alabama in a manner designed to incite a breach of the peace".

=== Americus Four ===
In 1963, Aelony was asked to go back to Sumter County, Georgia, where Koinonia is located, to the town of Americus to assist with a voter registration drive there. Aelony worked with SNCC and the local Sumter County Movement to help blacks register to vote. He taught protest standards to picketers at a local restaurant, and he also showed the group's photographer how to take pictures that would be useful in court. He performed similar activities in Ocala, Florida. When Aelony took a sample picture, a deputy arrived and asked him to stop photographing. Aelony said "it's a free country", and was immediately arrested. He was taken to jail in Ocala. Officers told the inmates he was a Freedom Rider, and left him unattended in the jail "bullpen", where he was beaten unconscious and kicked until a woman visitor called attention to the abuse. Aelony was eventually released after the intervention of Minnesota's governor, who was attending the Governor's Conference in Miami, and he returned to Americus. The arrests in Americus continued to take place; hundreds of people who were a part of the voting rights drive were taken to a camp outside of town.

Aelony attended the march as a non-participant observer and was arrested on a charge of insurrection against the state of Georgia. This charge carried the death penalty under Georgia's 1871 Anti-Treason Act. Three other CORE fieldworkers, Ralph Allen, Don Harris, and John Perdew, were arrested in Americus as well. With Aelony, this group became known as the Americus Four while they spent time on death row. Their arrest originally went unnoticed in the United States, but attracted attention in Europe and Africa. As public concern grew, awareness spread within the United States and eventually put pressure on the federal government to attend to the arrests in Georgia. The Americus Four were ultimately exonerated. Shortly afterward, he suffered a myocardial infarction and was hospitalized at Grady Hospital, by a local black physician who cared for the CORE workers. Thus, Aelony integrated the black ward at Grady Hospital. He was examined there by the famous academic cardiologist, Professor Willis Hurst, who felt his heart attack was related to his beating in Ocala, Florida. He was then advised to terminate his dangerous protest work in the deep South.

== Later life and death ==
Aelony continued to be politically active in his hometown of Minneapolis throughout his life. He worked on the political campaign of Keith Ellison, a Muslim who ran for Congress on a peace platform. In 2006, Ellison became the first Muslim elected to Congress; he was also the first African-American from Minnesota to be elected to the House of Representatives.

Aelony died of metastatic colon cancer on November 1, 2009, at his home. He was 71 years old.
