= Fred Kingsbury =

American rower (1927–2011)

Medal record

Men's rowing

Representing the United States

Olympic Games
Bronze medal – third place	1948 London	Coxless four

Frederick John Kingsbury IV (May 20, 1927 – October 7, 2011) was an American rower who competed in the 1948 Summer Olympics.

He was born in Fredericksburg, Virginia and was the son of Frederick John Kingsbury Jr.

In 1948 he was a crew member of the American boat which won the bronze medal in the coxless fours event. He went on to a career in sonar technology in New London, Connecticut. He settled in Guilford.
