= Luigi Bartesaghi =

Canadian cyclist (1932–2022)

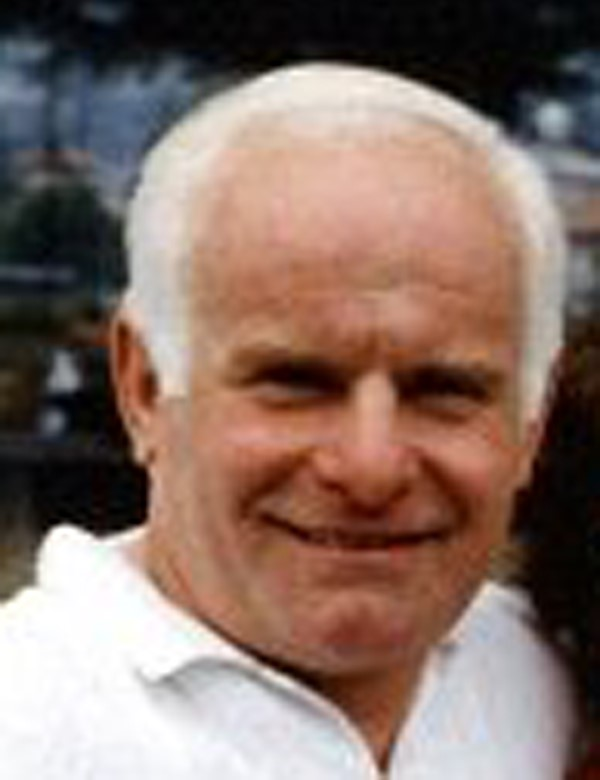

Personal information
- Nickname: Ti-Rouge
- Born: 14 October 1932 Mandello del Lario, Italy
- Died: 10 November 2022 (aged 90) Lecco, Italy

Cycling career
- Sport: Cycling

Luigi Bartesaghi (14 October 1932 – 10 November 2022) was a Canadian cyclist. He competed in the individual road race at the 1960 Summer Olympics. Bartesaghi died in Lecco on 10 November 2022, at the age of 90.
