= Niels Ingwersen =

Danish scholar (1935–2009)

Niels Ingwersen (May 18, 1935 - November 14, 2009) was a Danish scholar in Scandinavian Studies and a professor at the University of Wisconsin–Madison. His courses on Hans Christian Andersen were particularly popular.

== Early life ==
Born in Horsens, Denmark, Ingwersen studied Scandinavian literature at the University of Copenhagen, Stockholm University and the University of Oslo. When in Oslo, he met an American student, Faith Boswell Sloniger, whom he married in Tybjerg, near Næstved, Denmark, in 1961.

== Career ==
In the early 1960s, Ingwersen and his wife moved to the United States, first spending a year at the University of Chicago and then, after he completed his studies in Denmark, the couple moved to Madison in 1965 where he joined the Department of Scandinavian Studies as an assistant professor, becoming a full professor in 1973. He was a key member of the faculty, chairing Scandinavian Studies and Folklore several times and serving as president of the Society for the Advancement of Scandinavian Studies Department (SASS) from 1969–1971. He was also visiting professor at the universities of Odense and Aarhus and at the University of California, Los Angeles. His multimedia course on Hans Christian Andersen attracted a record 873 students, later being offered through the university's public television extension. He served almost 40 years at Madison, retiring in 2003.

In addition to Hans Christian Andersen, Ingwersen's regular courses included Søren Kierkegaard as well as special attention to ballads and folktales, addressing more than 15,000 students over the years. From 1985 to 1990, together with his wife, Ingwersen edited the prestigious North-American journal Scandinavian Studies.

== Assessment ==
In the Festschrift in honour of Ingwersen's retirement, Susan Brantly commented: "Niels possesses the rare talent of making complex issues seem simple, and the backbone of his teaching method is telling stories that engage students and get the message across."

== Works ==
- Ingwersen, Niels (1976). Martin A. Hansen. Twayne Publishers. ISBN 978-0-8057-6259-4.
- Ingwersen, Niels (1984). Quests for a promised land: the works of Martin Andersen Nexø. Greenwood Press. ISBN 978-0-313-24469-8.
- Ingwersen, Niels (2008). The Scandinavian Magic Tale and Narrative Folklore: A Study in Genres, Themes, and Sources. Edwin Mellen Press. ISBN 978-0-7734-4983-1.
- Ingwersen, Niels (1981). Seventeen Danish poets: a bilingual anthology of contemporary Danish poetry. Windflower Press. ISBN 9780931534102.
- Ingwersen, Niels (1995). The Need for Narrative: The Folktale as Response to History. UT.

== Awards ==
Ingwersen was awarded the Order of the Dannebrog in 1997 for promoting Danish literature and culture in the United States. He also received several awards for excellence in teaching and for his courses at Wisconsin-Madison.
