= William Bresnan =

American businessman

William J. Bresnan (1933 – November 27, 2009) was an American businessman who founded Bresnan Communications in 1984. He was also chair of the company until his death in 2009.

William Bresnan was born in Madison Lake, Minnesota in 1933. He was the third of four children of Ann and Robert Leonard Bresnan. When Bresnan was five years old, his father died from tuberculosis leaving Ann to take care of the family working as a seamstress.

At 12, Bresnan began fixing radios for his neighbors working out of his home and the local radio shop. He attended a two-year program focusing on television and radio repair at Mankato Technical School, which is now called South Central College.

Eventually, he was offered a job at the Northwest Radio and Electronic Supply – when Bresnan heard that a cable system was going to be built in Mankato, he set up a distributorship agreement with Times Wiring Cable, the company that supplied the cable.

In 1958, Bresnan, along with engineer Joseph Poire, built the Mankato cable system. When Poire offered him the job as assistant chief engineer of the newly minted Rochester, MN cable system, he signed on. When the chief engineer of the Rochester system disappeared, Bill took over and for the next seven years.

In 1965, Jack Kent Cooke purchased the Rochester system and offered Bill the position of chief engineer. Bresnan agreed, marking the beginning of a 50-year history as a pioneer in the cable industry.

After merging with H&B American Corporation to form H&B American Cablevision in 1968, Cooke made Bresnan president. Two years later, the company merged with MSO TelePrompTer and by 1974 had reached a goal of a million customers.

Ultimately TelePrompTer was sold to Westinghouse and after managing the transition Bresnan was determined to create his own MSO and seized the opportunity when he won a bid for five systems in the Upper Peninsula of Michigan. This was the beginning of Bresnan Communications.

In 2000 Bresnan communications sold their North American cable systems to Charter Communications. In April 2002, Bresnan Communications re-entered the US cable management business through the purchase of the former TCI Rocky mountain systems in Montana, Wyoming, Utah and Colorado. In 2010 Cablevision Systems Corporation, which provides service to approximately 3,000,000 customers in New York City and surrounding suburban markets, purchased the Bresnan Rocky Mountain markets through a merger which was completed in 2011. Approximately one year after assimilating these systems, Cablevision announced their intent to sell the recently acquired non-NY footprint. Charter Communications of Stamford CT subsequently won the auction for the assets, adding these Bresnan systems to the original Bresnan midwestern footprint they acquired in 2000.

William J. Bresnan died on November 27, 2009, at his home in Greenwich, Connecticut, from complications due to cancer at the age of 75.
