= Sietze Haarsma =

Dutch rower

Personal information
- Nationality: Dutch
- Born: 22 June 1926; Zwolle, Netherlands
- Died: 21 December 2017 (aged 91)

Sport
- Sport: Rowing

Sietze Haarsma (22 June 1926 – 21 December 2017) was a Dutch rower. He competed in the men's coxless four event at the 1948 Summer Olympics.
