= Madison Lake, Minnesota =

City in Minnesota, United States

Madison Lake
- City
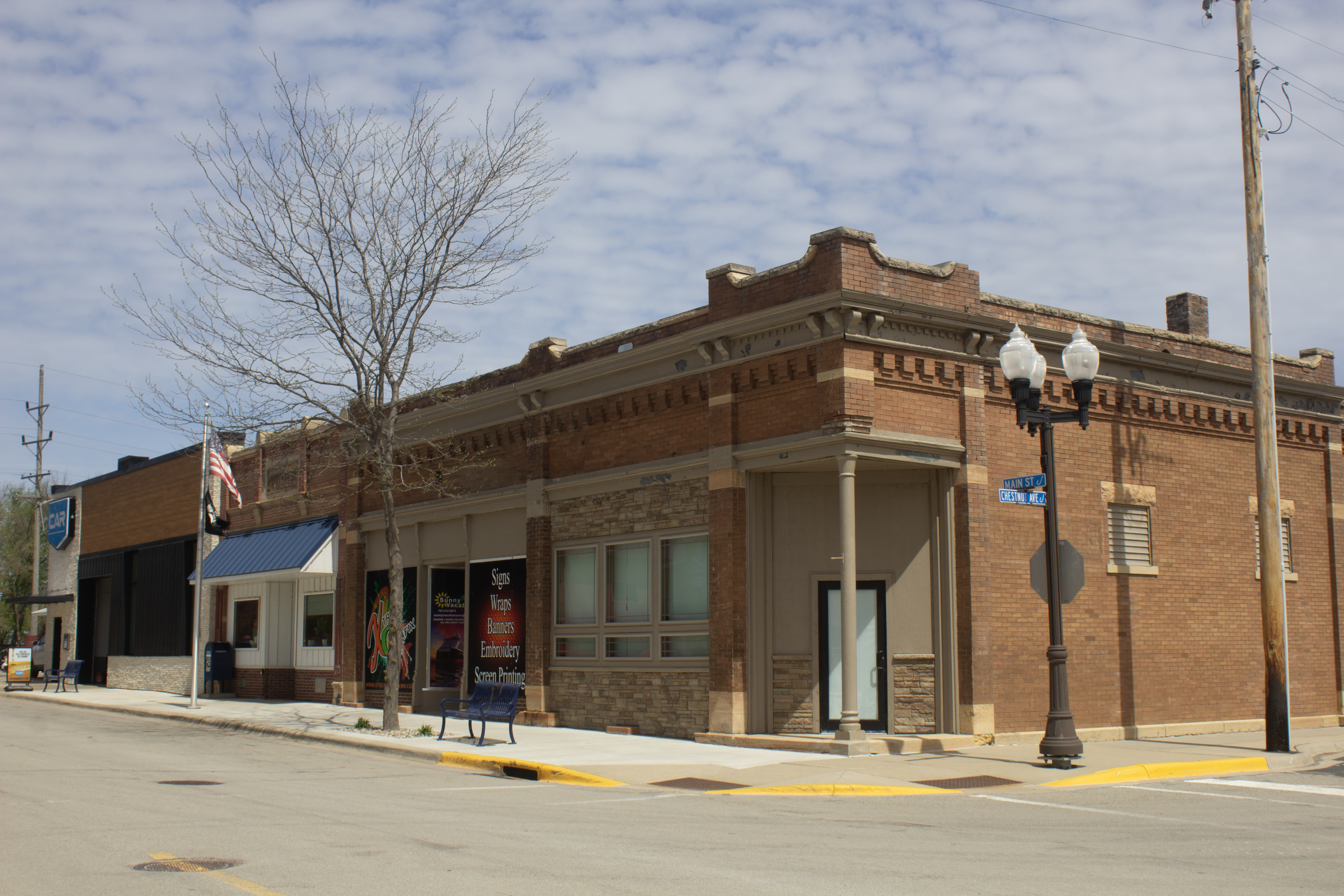
- Commercial businesses along Main Street

- Location of Madison Lake, Minnesota
- Coordinates: 44°12′27″N 93°49′03″W
- Country: United States
- State: Minnesota
- County: Blue Earth
- Settled: 1871
- Platted: January 17, 1885
- Incorporated (village): December 15, 1891
- Incorporated (city): January 5, 1892

Government
  - Type: Mayor - Council
  - Mayor: Al Dorn

Area
  - Total: 1.36 sq mi (3.53 km^{2})
  - Land: 1.35 sq mi (3.50 km^{2})
  - Water: 0.012 sq mi (0.03 km^{2})
- Elevation: 1,053 ft (321 m)

Population (2020)
  - Total: 1,247
  - Estimate (2022): 1,280
  - Density: 921.9/sq mi (355.93/km^{2})
- Time zone: UTC-6 (Central)
  - Summer (DST): UTC-5 (CDT)
- ZIP code: 56063
- Area code: 507
- FIPS code: 27-39320
- GNIS feature ID: 2395811
- Website: ci.madison-lake.mn.us

Madison Lake is a small city in Blue Earth County, Minnesota, United States. The city takes its name from nearby Madison Lake, and is located adjacent to the northwest shore of the lake. The population was 1,247 at the 2020 census. It is part of the Mankato, MN Metropolitan Statistical Area.

== History ==
The area that is now Madison Lake was originally called Barclay's addition. In 1881, this land was deeded to L.S. Barclay for the town and was shortly thereafter named Madison Lake. A post office called Madison Lake has been in operation since 1885. The town took its name from nearby Madison Lake, which was named for President James Madison. The Village was incorporated in 1892.

The Wisconsin, Minnesota and Pacific Railroad built westward from Red Wing, Minnesota, reaching Madison Lake by 1884 at a distance 78.4 miles. Mankato, a further 20 miles westward, was reached by 1887. The railroad line became part of the Chicago Great Western Railroad. This railroad is now abandoned and is the route of the Sakatah Singing Hills State Trail.

On Friday, December 23, 1910, four blocks of downtown Madison Lake were devastated by fire. The loss was estimated at $100,000 at the time.

== Geography ==
According to the United States Census Bureau, the city has a total area of 1.04 square miles (2.69 km^{2}), of which 1.03 square miles (2.67 km^{2}) is land and 0.01 square miles (0.03 km^{2}) is water.

Minnesota State Highway 60 serves as a main route in the community. U.S. Route 14 is nearby.

== Demographics ==
Historical population
Census	Pop.	Note	%±
1900	300		—
1910	335		11.7%
1920	359		7.2%
1930	365		1.7%
1940	377		3.3%
1950	357		−5.3%
1960	477		33.6%
1970	587		23.1%
1980	592		0.9%
1990	643		8.6%
2000	837		30.2%
2010	1,017		21.5%
2020	1,247		22.6%
2022 (est.)	1,280		2.6%
U.S. Decennial Census; 2020 Census

According to the most recent American Community Survey, the racial composition of Madison Lake was:

- White: 94.57%
- Two or more races: 2.77%
- Black or African American: 2.25%
- Asian: 0.41%
- Native American: 0.00%
- Native Hawaiian or Pacific Islander: 0.00%
- Other race: 0.00%

=== 2010 census ===
As of the census of 2010, there were 1,017 people, 394 households, and 271 families living in the city. The population density was 987.4 inhabitants per square mile (381.2/km^{2}). There were 430 housing units at an average density of 417.5 per square mile (161.2/km^{2}). The racial makeup of the city was 96.7% White, 0.5% African American, 0.6% Native American, 0.5% Asian, 0.1% Pacific Islander, 1.1% from other races, and 0.6% from two or more races. Hispanic or Latino of any race were 2.0% of the population.

There were 394 households, of which 37.8% had children under the age of 18 living with them, 51.0% were married couples living together, 11.4% had a female householder with no husband present, 6.3% had a male householder with no wife present, and 31.2% were non-families. 22.8% of all households were made up of individuals, and 7.3% had someone living alone who was 65 years of age or older. The average household size was 2.58 and the average family size was 3.01.

The median age in the city was 33.3 years. 26.2% of residents were under the age of 18; 8.2% were between the ages of 18 and 24; 32.7% were from 25 to 44; 24.4% were from 45 to 64; and 8.5% were 65 years of age or older. The gender makeup of the city was 50.0% male and 50.0% female.

=== 2000 census ===
As of the census of 2000, there were 837 people, 319 households, and 223 families living in the city. A 2007 estimate shows the population has grown to 990. The population density was 1,794.4 inhabitants per square mile (692.8/km^{2}). There were 370 housing units at an average density of 793.2 per square mile (306.3/km^{2}). The racial makeup of the city was 98.21% White, 0.60% African American, 0.48% Native American, 0.36% Asian, and 0.36% from two or more races. Hispanic or Latino of any race were 2.27% of the population.

There were 319 households, out of which 38.9% had children under the age of 18 living with them, 55.5% were married couples living together, 10.0% had a female householder with no husband present, and 29.8% were non-families. 21.3% of all households were made up of individuals, and 9.4% had someone living alone who was 65 years of age or older. The average household size was 2.62 and the average family size was 3.09.

In the city, the population was spread out, with 29.5% under the age of 18, 7.8% from 18 to 24, 34.5% from 25 to 44, 19.1% from 45 to 64, and 9.1% who were 65 years of age or older. The median age was 32 years. For every 100 females, there were 100.7 males. For every 100 females age 18 and over, there were 98.7 males.

The median income for a household in the city was $84,659, and the median income for a family was $97,673. Males had a median income of $65,000 versus $44,938 for females. The per capita income for the city was $38,312. About 2.6% of families and 4.0% of the population were below the poverty line, including 3.7% of those under age 18 and 7.3% of those age 65 or over.

== Politics ==
=== Election results ===
Presidential election results

2020 Precinct Results Spreadsheet2016 Precinct Results Spreadsheet2012 Precinct Results Spreadsheet2008 Precinct Results Spreadsheet2004 Precinct Results Spreadsheet2000 Precinct Results Spreadsheet1996 Precinct Results1992 Precinct Results1988 Precinct Results1984 Precinct Results1980 Precinct Results1976 Precinct Results1968 Precinct Results1964 Precinct Results1960 Precinct Results
Year	Republican	Democratic	Third parties
2020	61.6% 468	37.1% 282	1.3% 10
2016	56.9% 360	35.2% 223	7.9% 50
2012	43.9% 231	53.8% 283	2.3% 12
2008	40.0% 211	57.6% 304	2.4% 13
2004	48.8% 263	49.0% 264	2.2% 12
2000	45.7% 190	44.7% 186	9.6% 40
1996	30.0% 102	55.0% 187	15.0% 51
1992	27.5% 94	43.3% 148	29.2% 100
1988	39.6% 107	60.4% 163	0.0% 0
1984	42.8% 131	58.2% 175	0.0% 0
1980	35.1% 93	58.1% 154	6.8% 18
1976	24.3% 93	64.1% 154	11.6% 33
1968	17.9% 43	78.8% 189	3.3% 8
1964	16.9% 40	82.6% 195	0.5% 1
1960	20.4% 43	79.6% 168	0.0% 0

== Madison Lake Watershed and Lake Association ==
The Madison Lake Watershed and Lake Association is a non-profit organization established for the purpose of protecting and preserving the natural resource of Madison Lake for future generations. MLWLA promotes the protection and improvement of the lake and surrounding watershed area through education and advocacy. Its goals include improving the water quality of the lake through an assessment of the lake's needs to determine the best approach to achieving a healthy, thriving lake and watershed ecosystem.

== Gallery ==
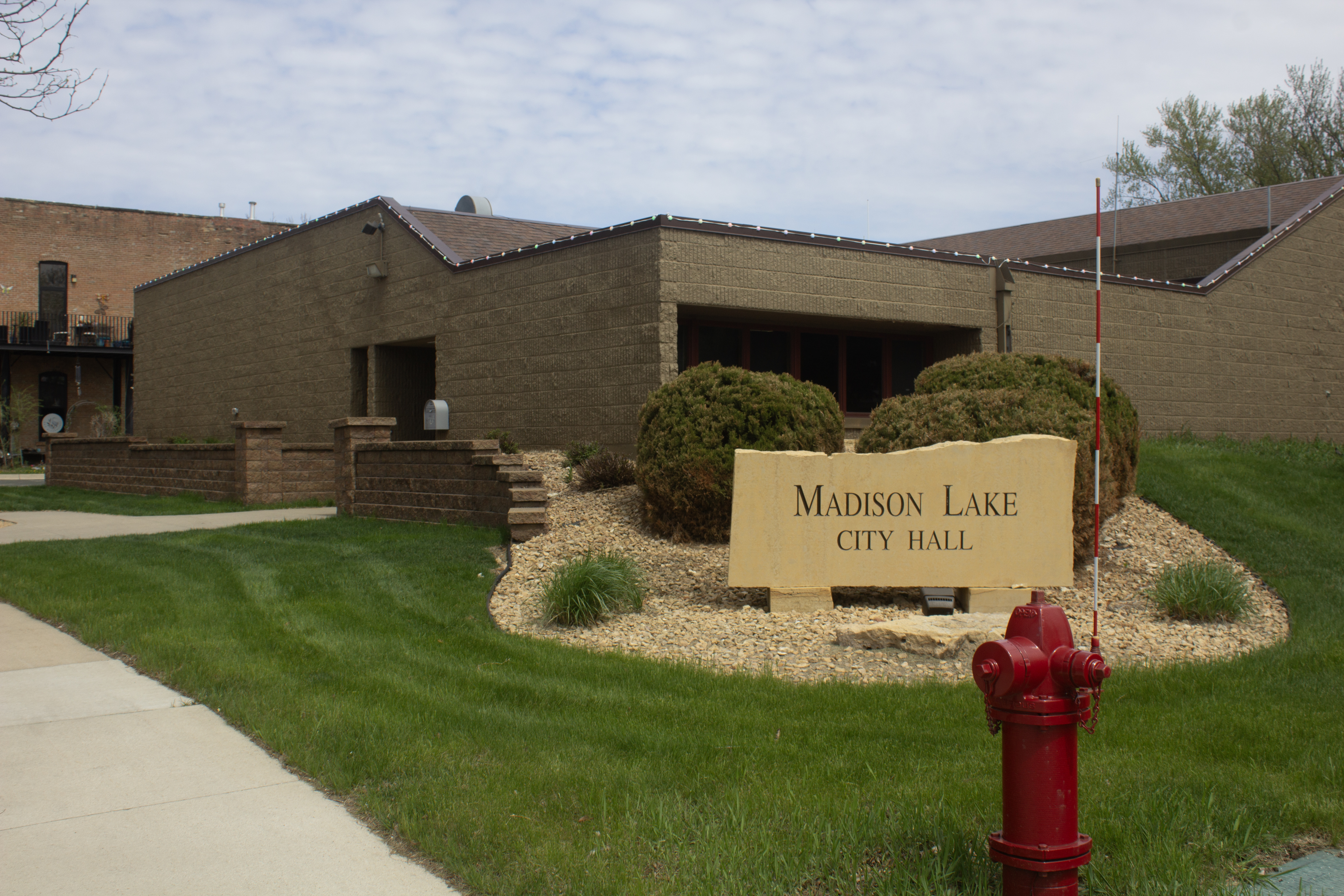
City Hall

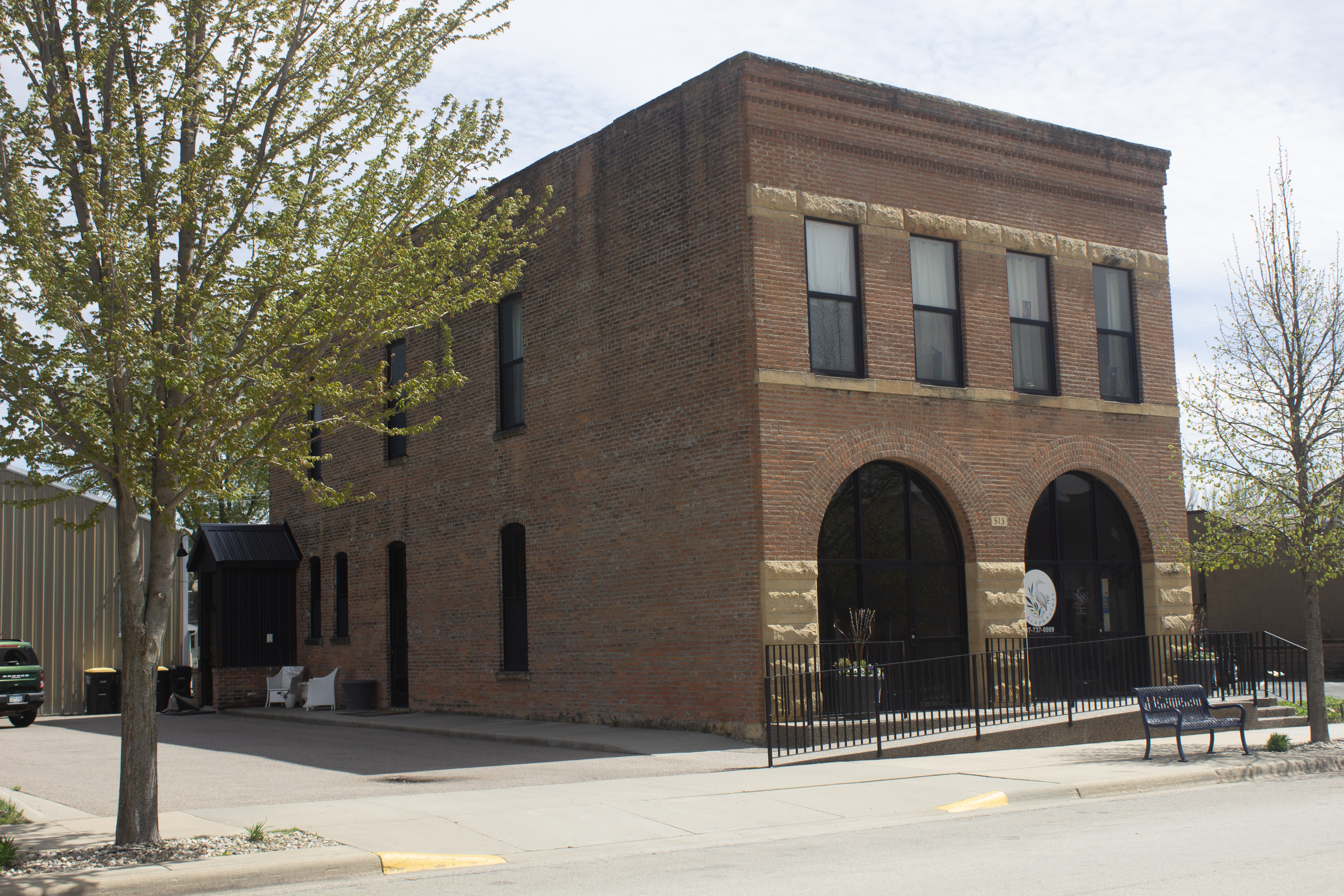
Former fire station

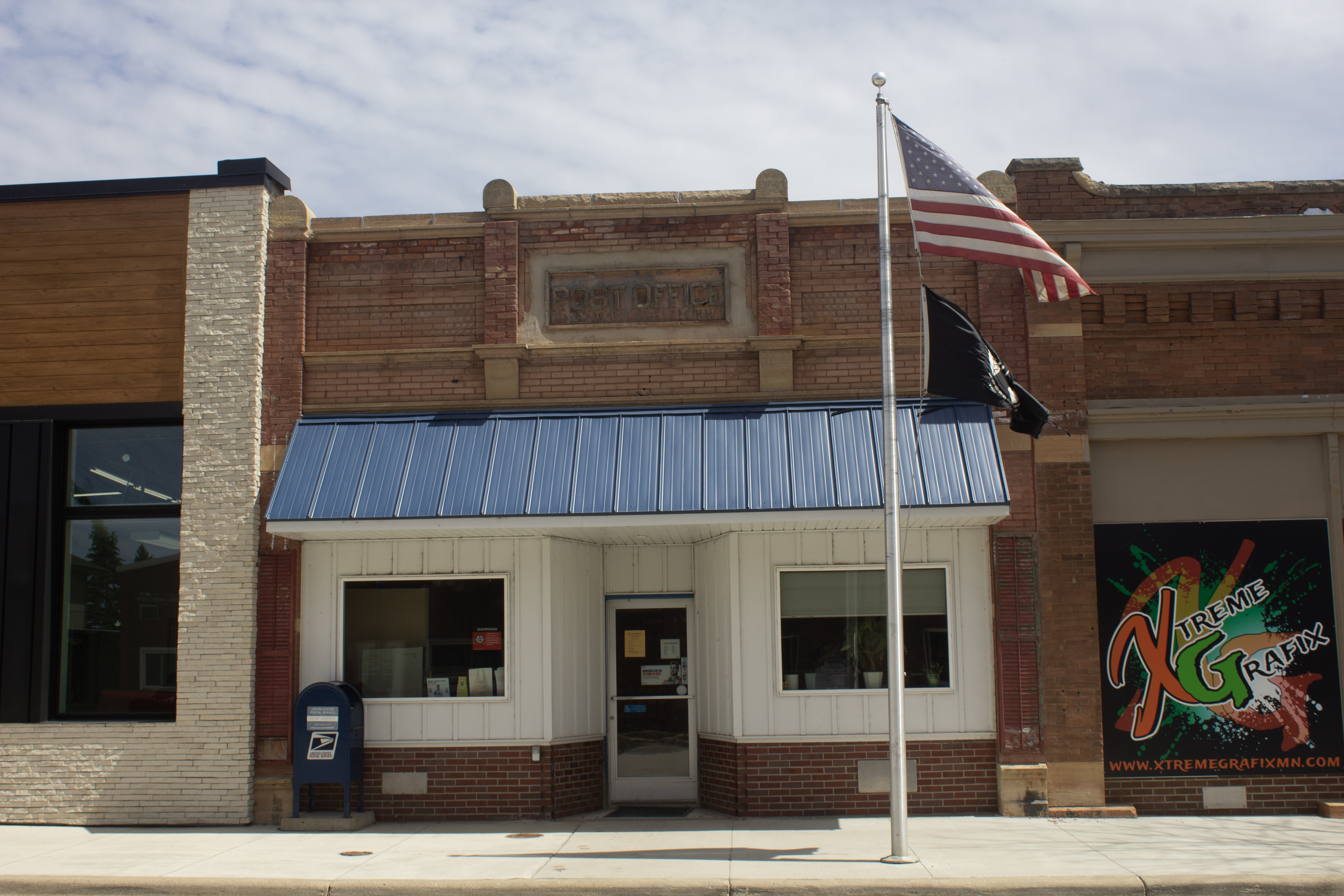
Post Office
