= Mohamed Abdi Aware =

Somalian judge

Mohamed Abdi Aware (died 12 November 2009) was a high-profile Somali judge in the northern semi-autonomous Puntland region of Somalia and a member of its Supreme Judicial Council. He was assassinated outside a mosque in Bossaso, capital of Puntland.

Sheikh Mohamed Abdi Aware was notorious for sentencing many Islamists from Al-Shabaab and other rebel movements as well as tens of pirates and human traffickers and putting them into jail. It is thought that his murder was in retaliation to some of these sentences. Police reports two masked gunmen shot him. He suffered injuries to his head and chest and died instantly.
