= Burleigh Hines =

American journalist

Burleigh Hines (August 26, 1932 - November 8, 2009) was an American television news reporter.

A native of Nashville, Tennessee, Hines began his career as a newspaper reporter. He wrote for the Memphis Tri-State Defender and the Chicago Daily News throughout the 1960s.

From 1968 until 1974, Hines was a correspondent for WBBM in Chicago. In 1974, he joined WBBM-TV as the station's editorial director. He transitioned to being an on-air reporter for the TV station, a position he held until retiring in 2001. He covered many types of stories including; crime, human interest stories, and animal stories. His great love was working on the streets, reporting on ordinary people doing remarkable things.

In 1968, Hines co-authored the book Nightmare in Detroit: A Rebellion and its Victims, with Van Gordon Sauter, who went on to become president of CBS News. The book is about Detroit riots in July, 1967.

== Personal ==
He is survived by his wife, Denise, his six children, and many grandchildren.
