= Mandello del Lario =

- Comune
- Comune di Mandello del Lario, Città di Mandello del Lario
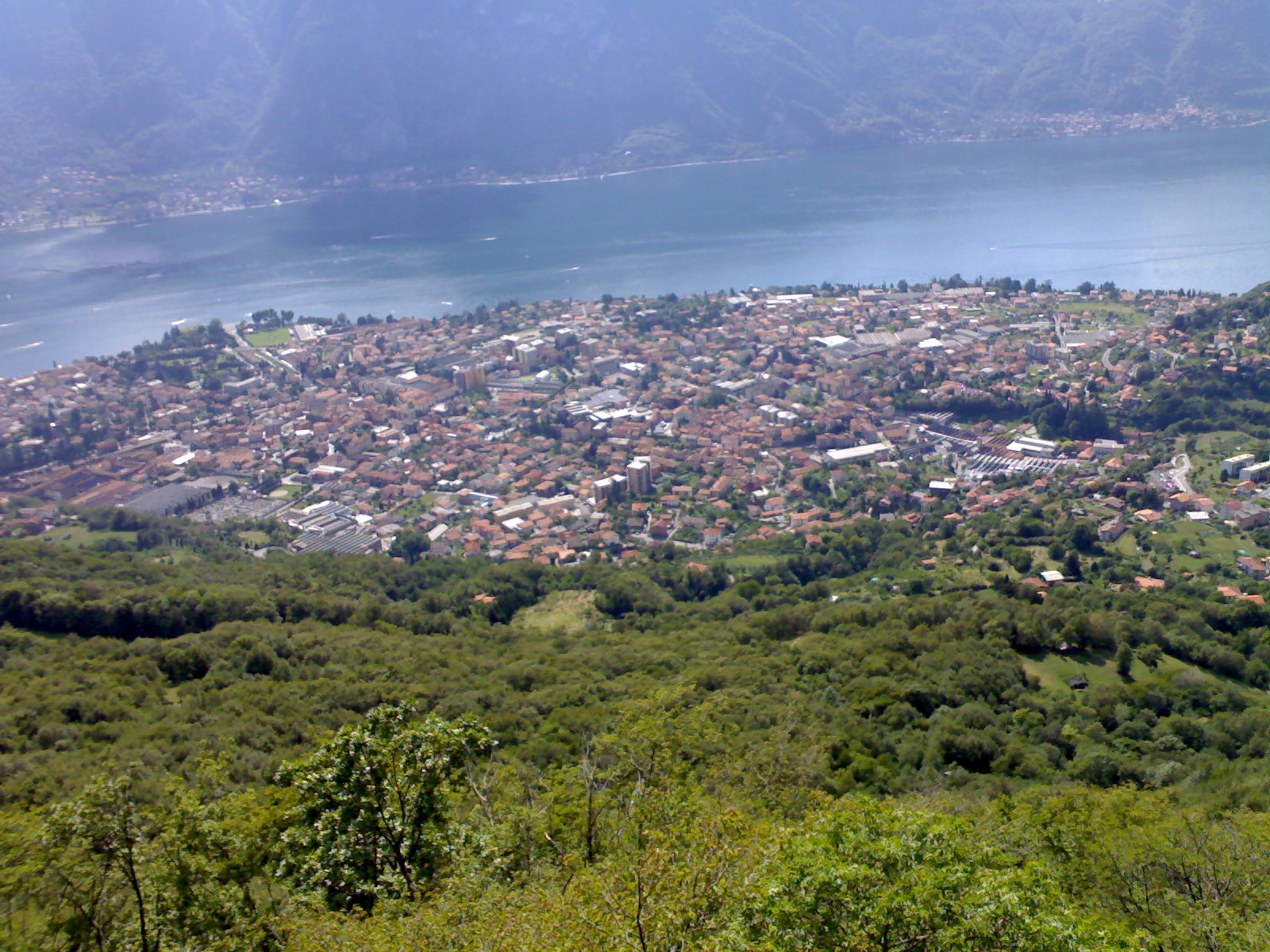

- Coat of arms

- Location within Italy Location within Lombardy
- Coordinates: 45°55′N 09°19′E
- Country: Italy
- Region: Lombardy
- Province: Lecco (LC)
- Frazioni: Olcio, Maggiana, Mandello a lago, Tonzanico, Molina, Mulini, Motteno, Cologna, Luzzeno, Moregallo, Rongio, Gorlo, Somana, Sonvico

Government
  - Mayor: Riccardo Fasoli

Area
  - Total: 43.33 km^{2} (16.73 sq mi)
- Elevation: 200 m (660 ft)

Population (30 September 2017)
  - Total: 10,340
  - Density: 238.6/km^{2} (618.1/sq mi)
- Demonym: Mandellesi
- Time zone: UTC+1 (CET)
  - Summer (DST): UTC+2 (CEST)
- Postal code: 23826
- Dialing code: 0341
- Patron saint: Saint Lawrence
- Website: Official website

Mandello del Lario (Lecchese: Mandèll) is an Italian town and comune in the province of Lecco, in Lombardy, on Lake Como. Mandello del Lario, located on the eastern shore of Lake Como.

Since 1921, Mandello del Lario has been home to Moto Guzzi—the Italian motorcycle manufacturer, now a subsidiary of Piaggio & Co. SpA. The town each year since 2001 has hosted GMG (a.k.a. Giornata Mondiale Guzzi or Worldwide Guzzi Days).

The Grigna massif is located in Mandello's communal territory.

== People of Mandello del Lario ==
- Antonio Rossi (b. 1968), regional councillor in Lombardy and Olympic canoeist, winner of five Olympic medals (three gold, one silver, one bronze) between 1992 and 2004.
- Giuseppe Moioli (1927–2025), Olympic rowing champion, gold medal in coxless four at the 1948 Summer Olympics in London, born in Olcio (a hamlet of Mandello).
- Attilio Cantoni (1931–2017), rower of the Moto Guzzi Sports Group, competed at the 1956 Summer Olympics in Melbourne.
- Giovanni Invernizzi (1926–1986), Olympic gold medalist in coxless four at the 1948 Summer Olympics with the Canottieri Moto Guzzi team.
- Giovanni Zucchi (1931–2021), rower, silver medalist in coxed four at the 1960 Summer Olympics in Rome.
- Fulvio Balatti (1938–2001), bronze medalist in coxed four at the 1960 Summer Olympics; also competed at the 1964 Summer Olympics in Tokyo.
- Gianpietro Gilardi (b. 1938), Olympic rower at the 1960 Summer Olympics in Rome.
- Ivo Stefanoni (1936–2021), Olympic rower at the 1960 Summer Olympics in Rome.
- Luigi Bartesaghi (1932–2022), cyclist born in Mandello del Lario, represented Canada at the 1960 Summer Olympics in Rome.
- Duilio Agostini (1926–2008), official Moto Guzzi rider, winner of the 1955 French Grand Prix; later ran a Moto Guzzi dealership and promoted the brand's international gatherings.

== Saint George's church ==
Saint George's church has a single hall with a visible truss ceiling and a quadrangular apse with a cross-vaulted ceiling. Its present aspect is due to restoration work which began in the 14th century, to a building which had already existed since the 11th century.

A holy-water font decorated with a geometrical twisting floral motif (very popular in the Como area between the 6th and 11th century) on the font and with a relief (not very prominent) showing a cross on the sides, is preserved from the original building.

In the nave are numerous votive frescoes dating back to the 15th century; the Crucifixion in the presbytery is from the end of the 15th century; the eschatological cycle, according to some researchers, is related to the Ligurian-Piedmontese painting tradition, whilst according to others it is closer to the local tradition, and is placed around 1480.

== See also ==
- Moto Guzzi
  - Moto Guzzi Museum
- Sanctuary of Beata Vergine del Fiume
