= Bresnan Communications =

Defunct American cable television provider

- Industry: Cable television
- Founded: 1984
- Founder: William Bresnan
- Defunct: June 13, 2010
- Fate: Acquired by Cablevision, later sold to Charter Communications
- Successor: Charter Communications
- Headquarters: Purchase, New York, USA
- Area served: United States, Chile, Poland
- Divisions: Bresnan International Partners

Bresnan Communications was an American cable television provider. Founded in 1984 and at one point active in the United States, Chile, and Poland, it was acquired by Cablevision in 2010, renamed Optimum West, and then sold to Charter Communications in 2013.

== History ==
Bresnan Communication was formed by William Bresnan in 1984. It originally operated cable systems on Michigan's Upper Peninsula. Over the next fourteen years, its operations spread to Minnesota, Wisconsin, Mississippi and Georgia. In 1994, the company added international operations in Chile and Poland, with the creation of Bresnan International Partners. The company reached 400,000 subscribers after purchasing systems from TCI. When AT&T acquired TCI, Bresnan began to consider an IPO. Before that could occur, Paul Allen's Charter Communications made an offer, and purchased Bresnan's U.S. cable systems for $3.1 billion, organizing them under Charter Communications' umbrella.

Bresnan re-entered the cable business in April 2002, with the $735 million purchase of former AT&T Broadband Rocky Mountain systems from Comcast. The acquisition included some 300,000 subscribers in Montana, Wyoming, Utah and Colorado.

Its founder, William Bresnan, died in 2009, after which the company was put up for auction by Providence Equity Partners, its majority shareholder. Minority stakeholders included Comcast and Quadrangle Group. In 2010, Bresnan Communications stated it had 320,000 customers in the United States. Cablevision acquired Bresnan on June 13, 2010 for $1.37 billion and rebranded the systems as Optimum West. In February 2013, Charter Communications agreed to buy the former Bresnan systems for $1.625 billion.

== See also ==
- List of United States telephone companies
