= Frans Haarsma =

Frans Haarsma (July 19, 1921 in Balk, Friesland – November 25, 2009 in Nijmegen) was a Roman Catholic priest of the Archdiocese of Utrecht. He was a theologian and emeritus Professor in Pastoral Theology at the Radboud University Nijmegen (formerly: Catholic University of Nijmegen).

In his boyhood there was hardly room enough in the big butcher's family. Therefore young Frans grew up at the house of an uncle and aunt who were without children. There he could find his way through the seminaries to the priesthood and to higher studies, including a doctorate.

In 1967 in the Netherlands all the Dutch seminaries were discontinued and Haarsma was asked to teach Pastoral Theology at the University in Nijmegen.

In the years before, during and after the Second Vatican Council Haarsma was involved in almost everything in the Dutch catholic and ecumenical field.

As a very prominent priest of the Archdiocese his name was often mentioned as a possible successor for Cardinal Alfrink, who was nearing retirement. Actually Alfrink was succeeded by Cardinal Willebrands.

Haarsma saw many fellow priests leave the priesthood, to marry or even to never set foot in a church again. Haarsma was different. He remained a very loyal albeit critical voice in the Church, critical both towards what he considered to be restorational tendencies from Rome as well as the policies of Dutch bishops. (See: Frans Haarsma, Morren tegen Mozes [Muttering against Moses])

During many years Haarsma cherished openly a friendship with his longtime contemporary and colleague at Nijmegen University, the feminist theologian Catharina Halkes.

Haarsma published several works of which only one was translated into English: Watching the Vatican; it dates back from the sixties and the Vatican Council and was illustrated by Frederick Franck. (Valkhof 1999 ISBN 90-5625-067-1)
