= Des Maybery =

South African rower

Desmond Rupert Maybery (27 March 1924 – 30 August 2009) was a South African rower who competed in the 1948 Summer Olympics. In 1948 he was a crew member of the South African boat that did not win a medal in the coxless fours event.
