= Cuba at the 1948 Summer Olympics =

- IOC code: CUB
- NOC: Cuban Olympic Committee

in London
- Competitors: 53 (53 men and 0 women) in 12 sports
- Flag bearer: Raúl García
- Medals Ranked 28th: Gold 0 Silver 1 Bronze 0 Total 1

Summer Olympics appearances (overview)
- 1900; 1904; 1908–1920; 1924; 1928; 1932–1936; 1948; 1952; 1956; 1960; 1964; 1968; 1972; 1976; 1980; 1984–1988; 1992; 1996; 2000; 2004; 2008; 2012; 2016; 2020; 2024

Cuba competed at the 1948 Summer Olympics in London, England. It was the first time in 20 years that Cuban athletes competed at the Olympic Games. 53 competitors, all men, took part in 31 events in 12 sports.

== Medalists ==
Medal	Name	Sport	Event	Date
Silver	Carlos de Cárdenas; Carlos de Cárdenas Jr.	Sailing	Men's Star	August 12

== Cycling ==
One male cyclist represented Cuba in 1948.

Sprint

- Reinaldo Paseiro

Time trial

- Reinaldo Paseiro

== Diving ==
Men

Athlete	Event	Final	
Athlete	Event	Points	Rank
José Castillo	3 m springboard	84.81	24

== Fencing ==
Six fencers, all men, represented Cuba in 1948.

Men's foil

- Armando Barrientos
- Lucilo de la Peña
- Jorge Agostini

Men's épée

- Roberto Mañalich
- Carlos Lamar

Men's team épée

- Roberto Mañalich, Carlos Lamar, Armando Barrientos, Juan Antonio Martínez

Men's sabre

- Roberto Mañalich
- Juan Antonio Martínez

== Rowing ==
Cuba had five male rowers participate in one out of seven rowing events in 1948.

Men's coxed four

- Ramón Cora
- Joaquin Godoy
- Manuel Puig
- Ramón Puig
- Tirso del Junco (cox)

== Shooting ==
Seven shooters represented Cuba in 1948.

25 metre pistol

- Hernando Hernández
- Rafael Cadalso
- Carlos Rodríguez-Feo

50 metre pistol

- Godofredo Basso
- Enrique Tejeda

50 metre rifle

- Orlando Santamaría
- Wilfredo Coto

== Swimming ==
Men

Ranks given are within the heat.

Athlete	Event	Heat		Semifinal		Final	
Athlete	Event	Time	Rank	Time	Rank	Time	Rank
Raúl García	100 m freestyle	1:02.5	7	Did not advance			
Nicasio Silverio	100 m freestyle	1:02.0	6	Did not advance			
