= United States at the 1948 Summer Olympics =

- Flag of the United States
- IOC code: USA
- NOC: United States Olympic Committee

in London
- Competitors: 300 (262 men and 38 women) in 19 sports
- Flag bearer: Ralph Craig
- Medals Ranked 1st: Gold 38 Silver 27 Bronze 19 Total 84

Summer Olympics appearances (overview)
- 1896; 1900; 1904; 1908; 1912; 1920; 1924; 1928; 1932; 1936; 1948; 1952; 1956; 1960; 1964; 1968; 1972; 1976; 1980; 1984; 1988; 1992; 1996; 2000; 2004; 2008; 2012; 2016; 2020; 2024; 2028

Other related appearances
- 1906 Intercalated Games

The United States competed at the 1948 Summer Olympics in London, England, United Kingdom. 300 competitors, 262 men and 38 women, took part in 126 events in 19 sports.

== Medalists ==
Medal	Name	Sport	Event	Date
Gold	Harrison Dillard	Athletics	Men's 100 metres	July 31
Gold	Roy Cochran	Athletics	Men's 400 metres hurdles	July 31
Gold	Willie Steele	Athletics	Men's long jump	July 31
Gold	Wally Ris	Swimming	Men's 100 metre freestyle	July 31
Gold	Glen Brand	Wrestling	Men's freestyle middleweight	July 31
Gold	Henry Wittenberg	Wrestling	Men's freestyle light heavyweight	July 31
Gold	Mal Whitfield	Athletics	Men's 800 metres	August 2
Gold	Guinn Smith	Athletics	Men's pole vault	August 2
Gold	Mel Patton	Athletics	Men's 200 metres	August 3
Gold	Wilbur Thompson	Athletics	Men's shot put	August 3
Gold	Bruce Harlan	Diving	Men's 3 metre springboard	August 3
Gold	Vicki Draves	Diving	Women's 3 metre springboard	August 3
Gold	Arthur Cook	Shooting	Men's 50 metre rifle prone	August 3
Gold	Jimmy McLane; Wally Ris; Bill Smith; Wally Wolf	Swimming	Men's 4 × 200 metre freestyle relay	August 3
Gold	William Porter	Athletics	Men's 110 metres hurdles	August 4
Gold	Bill Smith	Swimming	Men's 400 metre freestyle	August 4
Gold	Sammy Lee	Diving	Men's 10 metre platform	August 5
Gold	Bob Mathias	Athletics	Men's decathlon	August 6
Gold	Vicki Draves	Diving	Women's 10 metre platform	August 6
Gold	Allen Stack	Swimming	Men's 100 metre backstroke	August 6
Gold	Marie Corridon; Ann Curtis; Brenda Helser; Thelma Kalama	Swimming	Women's 4 × 100 metre freestyle relay	August 6
Gold	Harrison Dillard; Barney Ewell; Mel Patton; Lorenzo Wright	Athletics	Men's 4 × 100 metres relay	August 7
Gold	Cliff Bourland; Roy Cochran; Arthur Harnden; Mal Whitfield	Athletics	Men's 4 × 400 metres relay	August 7
Gold	Alice Coachman	Athletics	Women's high jump	August 7
Gold	Jimmy McLane	Swimming	Men's 1500 metre freestyle	August 7
Gold	Joe Verdeur	Swimming	Men's 200 metre breaststroke	August 7
Gold	Ann Curtis	Swimming	Women's 400 metre freestyle	August 7
Gold	Gordon Giovanelli; Bob Martin; Allen Morgan; Warren Westlund; Bob Will	Rowing	Men's coxed four	August 9
Gold	George Ahlgren; David Brown; Lloyd Butler; James Hardy; Justus Smith; John Stack; David Turner; Ian Turner	Rowing	Men's eight	August 9
Gold	Joseph DePietro	Weightlifting	Men's 56 kg	August 9
Gold	Frank Spellman	Weightlifting	Men's 75 kg	August 10
Gold	Steven Lysak; Stephen Macknowski	Canoeing	Men's C-2 10000 metres	August 11
Gold	Stanley Stanczyk	Weightlifting	Men's 82.5 kg	August 11
Gold	John Davis	Weightlifting	Men's +82.5 kg	August 11
Gold	Hilary Smart; Paul Smart	Sailing	Star	August 12
Gold	Alfred Loomis; Michael Mooney; James H. Smith Jr. James Weekes; Herman Whiton	Sailing	6 Metre	August 12
Gold	Charles Anderson; Frank Henry; Earl Foster Thomson	Equestrian	Team eventing	August 13
Gold	United States men's national basketball team: Cliff Barker; Don Barksdale; Ralph Beard; Lew Beck; Vince Boryla; Gordon Carpenter; Alex Groza; Wallace Jones; Bob Kurland; Ray Lumpp; R. C. Pitts; Jesse Renick; Jackie Robinson; Kenny Rollins	Basketball	Men's tournament	August 14
Silver	Barney Ewell	Athletics	Men's 100 metres	July 31
Silver	Alan Ford	Swimming	Men's 100 metre freestyle	July 31
Silver	Gerald Leeman	Wrestling	Men's freestyle bantamweight	July 31
Silver	Ann Curtis	Swimming	Women's 100 metre freestyle	August 2
Silver	Barney Ewell	Athletics	Men's 200 metres	August 3
Silver	Jim Delaney	Athletics	Men's shot put	August 3
Silver	Miller Anderson	Diving	Men's 3 metre springboard	August 3
Silver	Zoe Ann Olsen	Diving	Women's 3 metre springboard	August 3
Silver	Walter Tomsen	Shooting	Men's 50 metre rifle prone	August 3
Silver	Clyde Scott	Athletics	Men's 110 metres hurdles	August 4
Silver	Steve Seymour	Athletics	Men's javelin throw	August 4
Silver	George Moore	Modern pentathlon	Men's competition	August 4
Silver	Jimmy McLane	Swimming	Men's 400 metre freestyle	August 4
Silver	Bruce Harlan	Diving	Men's 10 metre platform	August 5
Silver	Suzanne Zimmerman	Swimming	Women's 100 metre backstroke	August 5
Silver	Patsy Elsener	Diving	Women's 10 metre platform	August 6
Silver	Bob Cowell	Swimming	Men's 100 metre backstroke	August 6
Silver	Keith Carter	Swimming	Men's 200 metre breaststroke	August 7
Silver	Robert Borg; Earl Foster Thomson; Frank Henry	Equestrian	Team dressage	August 9
Silver	Pete George	Weightlifting	Men's 75 kg	August 10
Silver	Frank Havens	Canoeing	Men's C-1 10000 metres	August 11
Silver	Harold Sakata	Weightlifting	Men's 82.5 kg	August 11
Silver	Norbert Schemansky	Weightlifting	Men's +82.5 kg	August 11
Silver	Steven Lysak; Stephen Macknowski	Canoeing	Men's C-2 1000 metres	August 12
Silver	Ralph Evans	Sailing	Firefly	August 12
Silver	Hank Herring	Boxing	Welterweight	August 13
Silver	Frank Henry	Equestrian	Individual eventing	August 13
Bronze	George Stanich	Athletics	Men's high jump	July 30
Bronze	Herb Douglas	Athletics	Men's long jump	July 31
Bronze	Robert Bennett	Athletics	Men's hammer throw	July 31
Bronze	Leland Merrill	Wrestling	Men's freestyle welterweight	July 31
Bronze	Bob Richards	Athletics	Men's pole vault	August 2
Bronze	Fortune Gordien	Athletics	Men's discus throw	August 2
Bronze	Jim Fuchs	Athletics	Men's shot put	August 3
Bronze	Sammy Lee	Diving	Men's 3 metre springboard	August 3
Bronze	Patsy Elsener	Diving	Women's 3 metre springboard	August 3
Bronze	Craig Dixon	Athletics	Men's 110 metres hurdles	August 4
Bronze	Mal Whitfield	Athletics	Men's 400 metres	August 5
Bronze	Floyd Simmons	Athletics	Men's decathlon	August 6
Bronze	Audrey Patterson	Athletics	Women's 200 metres	August 6
Bronze	Bob Sohl	Swimming	Men's 200 metre breaststroke	August 7
Bronze	Greg Gates; Stu Griffing; Fred Kingsbury; Robert Perew	Rowing	Men's coxless four	August 9
Bronze	Richard Tom	Weightlifting	Men's 56 kg	August 9
Bronze	Miguel de Capriles; Dean Cetrulo; Norman C. Armitage; James Flynn; Tibor Nyilas; George Worth	Fencing	Men's team sabre	August 11
Bronze	Lockwood Pirie; Owen Torrey	Sailing	Swallow	August 12
Bronze	Ladislava Bakanic; Marian Barone; Dorothy Dalton; Meta Elste; Consetta Lenz; Helen Schifano; Clara Schroth; Anita Simonis	Gymnastics	Women's artistic team all-around	August 14

== Athletics ==
By winning the women's high jump, Alice Coachman became the first black woman to clinch an Olympic gold medal.

== Cycling ==
Nine cyclists represented the United States in 1948.

Individual road race

- Frank Brilando
- Ed Lynch
- Chester Nelsen
- Wendell Rollins

Team road race

- Frank Brilando
- Ed Lynch
- Chester Nelsen
- Wendell Rollins

Sprint

- Jack Heid

Time trial

- Jack Heid

Tandem

- Marvin Thomson
- Al Stiller

Team pursuit

- Al Stiller
- Thomas Montemage
- Ted Smith

== Diving ==
Men

Athlete	Event	Final	
Athlete	Event	Points	Rank
Miller Anderson	3 m springboard	157.29	2nd place, silver medalist(s)
Bruce Harlan	3 m springboard	163.64	1st place, gold medalist(s)
Sammy Lee	3 m springboard	145.52	3rd place, bronze medalist(s)
Bruce Harlan	10 m platform	122.30	2nd place, silver medalist(s)
Sammy Lee	10 m platform	130.05	1st place, gold medalist(s)

Women

Athlete	Event	Final	
Athlete	Event	Points	Rank
Vicki Draves	3 m springboard	108.74	1st place, gold medalist(s)
Patsy Elsener	3 m springboard	101.30	3rd place, bronze medalist(s)
Zoe Ann Olsen-Jensen	3 m springboard	108.23	2nd place, silver medalist(s)
Vicki Draves	10 m platform	68.87	1st place, gold medalist(s)
Patsy Elsener	10 m platform	66.28	2nd place, silver medalist(s)
Juno Stover-Irwin	10 m platform	62.63	5

== Fencing ==
20 fencers represented the United States in 1948.

Men's foil

- Dean Cetrulo
- Silvio Giolito
- Nathaniel Lubell

Men's team foil

- Daniel Bukantz, Dean Cetrulo, Dernell Every, Silvio Giolito, Nate Lubell, Austin Prokop

Men's épée

- Norman Lewis
- Joe de Capriles
- Albert Wolff

Men's team épée

- Norman Lewis, Andrew Boyd, Joe de Capriles, Donald Thompson, Albert Wolff, Ralph Goldstein

Men's sabre

- George Worth
- Tibor Nyilas
- Dean Cetrulo

Men's team sabre

- Norman Cohn-Armitage, George Worth, Tibor Nyilas, Dean Cetrulo, Miguel de Capriles, James Flynn

Women's foil

- Maria Cerra
- Jan York-Romary
- Helena Dow

== Football ==
Results
U.S. 0–9 Italy

Roster

- Robert Annis
- Walter Bahr
- Raymond Beckman
- Bill Bertani
- Charlie Colombo
- Joe Ferreira
- Steve Grivnow
- Manuel Martin
- Benny McLaughlin
- Gino Pariani
- Joseph Rego-Costa
- Archie Strimel
- Ed Souza
- John Souza
- Rolf Valtin

== Hockey ==
Head coach: Henry Goode as playing manager and Kurt Orban as playing coach.

No.	Pos.	Player	DoB	Age	Caps	Club	Tournament games	Tournament goals
	HB	Donald Buck	September 26, 1916	31	?	(United States) Mt. Washington Club	2	0
		Hughes Cauffman			October 29, 1916		0	0
	FW	Claus Gerson	November 12, 1917	30	?	(United States) New York Tennis and Hockey Club	3	0
	FW	Henry Goode	June 7, 1918	30	?		1	0
	FW	Frederick Hewitt	September 16, 1916	31	?	(United States) Mt. Washington Club	2	1
	HB	William Kurtz	December 18, 1917	30	?	(United States) Philadelphia Field Hockey Association	2	0
	HB	Hendrick Lubbers	December 30, 1926	21	?		3	0
	FW	Harry Marcoplos	January 28, 1926	22	?	(United States) Baltimore Field Hockey Club	3	0
	FW	Kurt Orban	August 6, 1916	31	?	(United States) Downtown Athletic Club	3	0
	B	John Renwick	May 13, 1921	27	?	(United States) Rye Field Hockey Club	3	0
		Phillip Schoettle			?		0	0
	HB	Sanders Sims	June 1, 1921	26	?	(United States) Philadelphia Hockey and Tennis Club	1	0
	GK	John Slade	May 30, 1908	40	?	(United States) Westchester Field Hockey Club	2	0
	B	Walter Stude	December 3, 1913	34	?	(United States) Baltimore Field Hockey Club	3	0
	FW/HB/GK	Felix Ucko	January 4, 1919	32	?	(United States) New York Field Hockey Club	3	0
	FW	William Wilson	October 26, 1917	30	?	(United States) Westchester Field Hockey Club	2	0

Felix Ucko played a different position in every match.

== Modern pentathlon ==
Three pentathletes represented the United States in 1948.

- George Moore
- Richard Gruenther
- Hale Baugh

== Rowing ==
The United States had 26 rowers participate in all seven rowing events in 1948.

Men's single sculls

- John B. Kelly Jr.

Men's double sculls

- Joe Angyal
- Arthur Gallagher

Men's coxless pair

- John Wade
- Ralph Stephan

Men's coxed pair

- Vincent Deeney
- Joseph Toland
- John McIntyre (cox)

Men's coxless four

- Fred Kingsbury
- Stu Griffing
- Greg Gates
- Robert Perew

Men's coxed four

- Warren Westlund
- Bob Martin
- Bob Will
- Gordy Giovanelli
- Allen Morgan (cox)

Men's eight

- Ian Turner
- David Turner
- James Hardy
- George Ahlgren
- Lloyd Butler
- David Brown
- Justus Smith
- John Stack
- Ralph Purchase (cox)

== Shooting ==
Twelve shooters represented the United States in 1948. In the 50 metre rifle event, Art Cook won gold and Walter Tomsen won silver.

25 metre pistol

- Bob Chow
- Philip Roettinger
- John Layton

50 metre pistol

- Joe Benner
- Walter Walsh
- Quentin Brooks

300 metre rifle

- Emmett Swanson
- Art Jackson
- Frank Parsons, Jr.

50 metre rifle

- Art Cook
- Walter Tomsen
- Harry Cail

== Swimming ==
Men

Athlete	Event	Heat		Semifinal		Final	
Athlete	Event	Time	Rank	Time	Rank	Time	Rank
Keith Carter	100 m freestyle	58.7	1 Q*	57.6	1 Q*	58.3	4
Alan Ford	100 m freestyle	59.2	1 Q*	57.8	2 Q*	57.8	2nd place, silver medalist(s)
Wally Ris	100 m freestyle	58.1	1 Q*	57.5 =OR	1 Q*	57.3 OR	1st place, gold medalist(s)
Bill Heusner	400 m freestyle	4:58.3	10 Q	4:57.4	9	Did not advance	
Jimmy McLane	400 m freestyle	4:42.2 OR	1 Q	4:49.5	3 Q	4:43.4	2nd place, silver medalist(s)
Bill Smith	400 m freestyle	4:45.3	2 Q	4:48.4	2 Q	4:41.0 OR	1st place, gold medalist(s)
Bill Heusner	1500 m freestyle	20:29.6	11 Q	20:23.9	8 q	20:45.4	8
Jimmy McLane	1500 m freestyle	20:17.7	6 Q	19:52.2	1 Q	19:18.5	1st place, gold medalist(s)
Forbes Norris	1500 m freestyle	20:21.0	10 Q	20:09.3	5 Q	20:18.8	6
Bob Cowell	100 m backstroke	1:06.9	1 Q*	1:08.5	1 Q*	1:06.5	2nd place, silver medalist(s)
Howard Patterson	100 m backstroke	1:09.3	2 Q*	1:09.9	4*	Did not advance	
Allen Stack	100 m backstroke	1:06.6	1 Q*	1:07.3	1 Q*	1:06.4	1st place, gold medalist(s)
Keith Carter	200 m breaststroke	2:46.3	4 Q	2:43.0	2 Q	2:40.2	2nd place, silver medalist(s)
Bob Sohl	200 m breaststroke	2:44.9	2 Q	2:44.4	5 Q	2:43.9	3rd place, bronze medalist(s)
Joe Verdeur	200 m breaststroke	2:40.0	1 Q	2:40.7	1 Q	2:39.3 OR	1st place, gold medalist(s)
Wally Ris; Wally Wolf; Jimmy McLane; Bill Smith; Bob Gibe; William Dudley; Edwin Gilbert; Eugene R. Rogers	4 × 200 m freestyle relay	8:55.9	2 Q*	—N/a		8:46.0 OR	1st place, gold medalist(s)

*Ranks given are within the heat.

Women

Athlete	Event	Heat		Semifinal		Final	
Athlete	Event	Time	Rank	Time	Rank	Time	Rank
Marie Corridon	100 m freestyle	1:08.4	9 Q	1:08.9	9	Did not advance	
Ann Curtis	100 m freestyle	1:06.9	2 Q	1:07.6	3 Q	1:06.5	2nd place, silver medalist(s)
Brenda Helser	100 m freestyle	1:09.0	13 Q	1:10.0	16	Did not advance	
Ann Curtis	400 m freestyle	5:32.0	8 Q	5:26.4	3 Q	5:17.8 OR	1st place, gold medalist(s)
Brenda Helser	400 m freestyle	5:30.0	5 Q	5:28.1	4 Q	5:26.0	5
Nancy Lees	400 m freestyle	5:29.6	4 Q	5:31.9	8 q	5:32.9	8
Barbara Jensen	100 m backstroke	1:18.8	11 Q	1:19.1	12	Did not advance	
Muriel Mellon	100 m backstroke	1:18.7	8 Q	1:18.2	6 Q	1:19.0	7
Suzanne Zimmerman	100 m backstroke	1:16.8	3 Q	1:16.8	2 Q	1:16.0	2nd place, silver medalist(s)
Clara LaMore	200 m breaststroke	3:23.6	6*	Did not advance			
Penny Pence	200 m breaststroke	3:28.1	7*	Did not advance			
Jeanne Wilson	200 m breaststroke	3:18.3	7*	Did not advance			
Marie Corridon; Thelma Kalama; Brenda Helser; Ann Curtis	4 × 100 m freestyle relay	4:34.1	2*	—N/a		4:29.2 OR	1st place, gold medalist(s)

*Ranks given are within the heat.
