= Rowing at the 1951 Mediterranean Games =

Rowing competition

- Venue: Lac de Nouzha
- Location: Alexandria, Egypt
- Dates: October 1951

The rowing events of the 1951 Mediterranean Games were held in Alexandria, Egypt.

== Medalists ==
Event	Gold	Silver	Bronze
Single sculls	Hussein El-Alfy (EGY)	Silvio Bergamini (ITA)	Panagiotis Skarpetas (GRE)
Double sculls	Italy (ITA); Antonio Balossi; Silvio Bergamini	No silver awarded	No bronze awarded
Coxed pairs	Italy (ITA); Luciano Marion; Giuseppe Ramani; Aldo Tarlao	Greece (GRE); Iraklis Klangas	Egypt (EGY)
Coxed fours	Italy (ITA); Domenico Cambieri; Guido Cristinelli; Angelo Ghidini; Francesco Gotti; Reginaldo Polloni	Egypt (EGY)	Greece (GRE)
Eights	Italy (ITA); Erio Bettega; Domenico Cambieri; Guido Cristinelli; Angelo Ghidini; Francesco Gotti; Reginaldo Polloni; Giuseppe Ramani; Nicolò Simone; Aldo Tarlao	Egypt (EGY)	No bronze awarded

== Medal table ==
Rank	Nation	Gold	Silver	Bronze	Total
1	Italy (ITA)	4	1	0	5
2	Egypt (EGY)	1	2	1	4
3	Greece (GRE)	0	1	2	3
Totals (3 entries)		5	4	3	12
