= Rowing at the 1948 Summer Olympics – Men's coxed four =

Men's coxed four at the Games of the XIV Olympiad
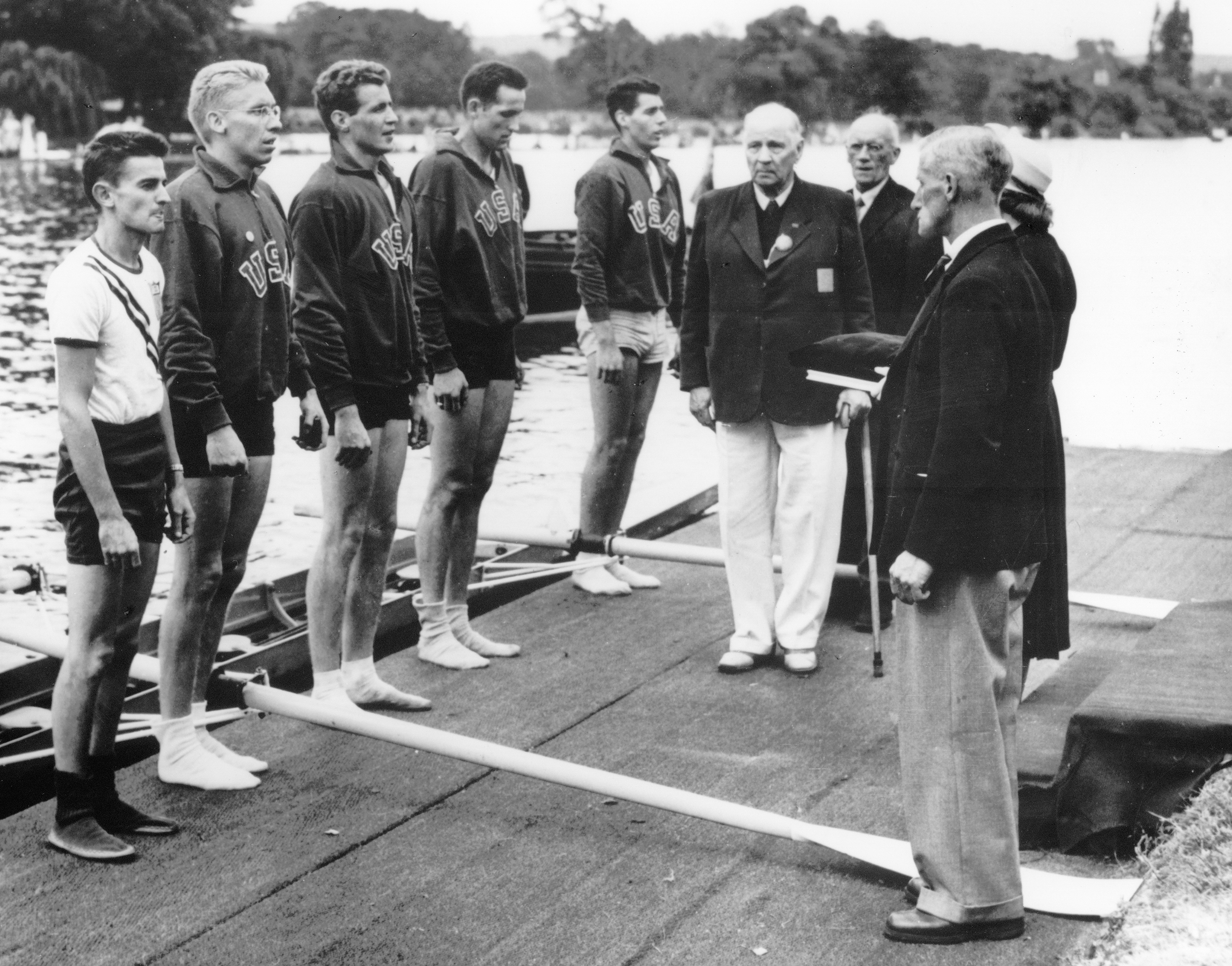
- United States team receives its gold medals
- Venue: Henley-on-Thames
- Dates: August 5–9, 1948
- Competitors: 80 from 16 nations
- Winning time: 6:50.3

Medalists
1st place, gold medalist(s)		United States: Warren Westlund; Bob Martin; Bob Will; Gordy Giovanelli; Allen Morgan (cox)
2nd place, silver medalist(s)		Switzerland: Rudolf Reichling; Erich Schriever; Émile Knecht; Peter Stebler; André Moccand (cox)
3rd place, bronze medalist(s)		Denmark: Erik Larsen; Børge Raahauge Nielsen; Henry Larsen; Harry Knudsen; Ib Olsen (cox)

The men's coxed four competition at the 1948 Summer Olympics in London took place at Henley-on-Thames, London. It was held from 5 to 9 August. There were 16 boats (80 competitors) from 16 nations, with each nation limited to a single boat in the event. The event was won by the United States, the nation's first victory in the men's coxed four. Switzerland earned silver, the nation's fifth medal in the event in six Games (having missed the podium only in 1932, when no Swiss team competed). Denmark took its first medal in the men's coxed four since 1912, with bronze.

== Background ==
This was the eighth appearance of the event. Rowing had been on the programme in 1896 but was cancelled due to bad weather. The coxed four was one of the four initial events introduced in 1900. It was not held in 1904 or 1908, but was held at every Games from 1912 to 1992 when it (along with the men's coxed pair) was replaced with the men's lightweight double sculls and men's lightweight coxless four.

Seven of the 16 nations from the 1936 Games returned, including silver medalist Switzerland and bronze medalist France. The two-time reigning champions were Germany, not invited to the 1948 Games following World War II and thus unable to defend their title. The favourites were France and Italy, the winners and runners-up of the 1947 European championship.

Argentina, Australia, Cuba, Greece, and Portugal each made their debut in the event. France and the United States both made their sixth appearance, tied for most among nations to that point.

== Competition format ==
The coxed four event featured five-person boats, with four rowers and a coxswain. It was a sweep rowing event, with the rowers each having one oar (and thus each rowing on one side). The venue, Henley-on-Thames, imposed certain restrictions and modifications to the format. The course could handle only three boats at a time (and this required expansion of the typical Henley course), so the six-boat final introduced in 1936 was not possible this time. The course distance was also modified; instead of either the 2000 metres distance that was standard for the Olympics or the 1 mile 550 yards (2112 metres) standard at Henley, a course that was somewhat shorter than either was used. Sources disagree on the exact distance: 1929 metres is listed by the Official Report, though other sources say 1850 metres.

- Round 1: Eight heats, with 2 boats each. The winner of each advanced to the quarterfinals; the loser went to the repechage.
- Repechage: Four heats, with 2 boats each. The winner of each advanced to the quarterfinals; the loser was eliminated.
- Quarterfinals: Six heats, with 2 boats each. The winner of each advanced to the semifinals; the loser was eliminated.
- Semifinals: Three heats, with 2 boats each. The winner of each advanced to the final; the loser was eliminated.
- Final: A single final, with 3 boats.

== Schedule ==
All times are British Summer Time (UTC+1)

Date	Time	Round
Thursday, 5 August 1948		Round 1
Friday, 6 August 1948		Repechage
Saturday, 7 August 1948	9:30; 16:30	Quarterfinals; Semifinals
Monday, 9 August 1948	14:30	Final

== Results ==
=== Round 1 ===
==== Heat 1 ====
Rank	Rowers	Coxswain	Nation	Time	Notes
1	António Torres; Delfim José da Silva; José Joaquim Cancela; José do Seixo	Leonel Rêgo	Portugal	6:51.4	Q
2	Filas Paraskevaidis; Nikos Filippidis; Iraklis Klangas; Nikos Nikolaou	Grigorios Emmanouil	Greece	7:07.2	R

==== Heat 2 ====
Rank	Rowers	Coxswain	Nation	Time	Notes
1	Miklós Zágon; Lajos Nagy; József Sátori; Tibor Nádas	Róbert Zimonyi	Hungary	6:58.8	Q
2	Šime Bujas; Stipe Krnčević; Jakov Labura; Daniel Krnćević	Duško Đorđević	Yugoslavia	7:08.0	R

==== Heat 3 ====
Rank	Rowers	Coxswain	Nation	Time	Notes
1	Domenico Cambieri; Riccardo Cerutti; Francesco Gotti; Renato Macario	Reginaldo Polloni	Italy	6:49.1	Q
2	Wal Lambert; Hugh Lambie; Colin Douglas-Smith; Jack Webster	Tom Darcy	Australia	7:04.3	R

==== Heat 4 ====
Rank	Rowers	Coxswain	Nation	Time	Notes
1	Warren Westlund; Bob Martin; Bob Will; Gordy Giovanelli	Allen Morgan	United States	6:48.8	Q
2	Anthony Purssell; Robert Collins; William Woodward; William Leckie	John Healey	Great Britain	7:01.9	R

==== Heat 5 ====
Rank	Rowers	Coxswain	Nation	Time	Notes
1	Erwin Bittmann; Karl Sitter; Franz Frauneder; Theodor Obrietan	Karl Riedel	Austria	7:02.2	Q
2	Ramón Cora; Joaquin Godoy; Manuel Puig; Ramón Puig	Tirso del Junco	Cuba	7:08.7	R

==== Heat 6 ====
Rank	Rowers	Coxswain	Nation	Time	Notes
1	Erik Larsen; Børge Raahauge Nielsen; Henry Larsen; Harry Knudsen	Ib Olsen	Denmark	6:52.5	Q
2	Arne Serck-Hanssen; Gunnar Sandborg; Sigurd Grønli; Willy Evensen	Thoralf Sandaker	Norway	6:58.9	R

==== Heat 7 ====
Rank	Rowers	Coxswain	Nation	Time	Notes
1	Rudolf Reichling; Erich Schriever; Émile Knecht; Peter Stebler	André Moccand	Switzerland	6:57.3	Q
2	Carlos Semino; Carlos Crosta; Adolfo Yedro; Ítalo Sartori	Ricardo Boneo	Argentina	7:07.9	R

==== Heat 8 ====
Rank	Rowers	Coxswain	Nation	Time	Notes
1	Jean-Paul Pieddeloup; René Lotti; Gérald Maquat; Jean-Pierre Souche	Marcel Boigegrain	France	6:57.7	Q
2	Veikko Lommi; Helge Forsberg; Oiva Lommi; Osrik Forsberg	Veli Autio	Finland	7:00.6	R

=== Repechage ===
==== Repechage heat 1 ====
Rank	Rowers	Coxswain	Nation	Time	Notes
1	Veikko Lommi; Helge Forsberg; Oiva Lommi; Osrik Forsberg	Veli Autio	Finland	7:01.6	Q
2	Wal Lambert; Hugh Lambie; Colin Douglas-Smith; Jack Webster	Tom Darcy	Australia	7:07.1	

==== Repechage heat 2 ====
Rank	Rowers	Coxswain	Nation	Time	Notes
1	Arne Serck-Hanssen; Gunnar Sandborg; Sigurd Grønli; Willy Evensen	Thoralf Sandaker	Norway	7:04.4	Q
2	Šime Bujas; Stipe Krnčević; Jakov Labura; Daniel Krnćević	Duško Đorđević	Yugoslavia	7:13.5	

==== Repechage heat 3 ====
Rank	Rowers	Coxswain	Nation	Time	Notes
1	Ramón Cora; Joaquin Godoy; Manuel Puig; Ramón Puig	Tirso del Junco	Cuba	7:12.0	Q
2	Filas Paraskevaidis; Nikos Filippidis; Iraklis Klangas; Nikos Nikolaou	Grigorios Emmanouil	Greece	7:17.1	

==== Repechage heat 4 ====
Rank	Rowers	Coxswain	Nation	Time	Notes
1	Anthony Purssell; Robert Collins; William Woodward; William Leckie	John Healey	Great Britain	6:58.4	Q
2	Carlos Semino; Carlos Crosta; Adolfo Yedro; Ítalo Sartori	Ricardo Boneo	Argentina	7:00.1	

=== Quarterfinals ===
==== Quarterfinal 1 ====
Rank	Rowers	Coxswain	Nation	Time	Notes
1	Domenico Cambieri; Riccardo Cerutti; Francesco Gotti; Renato Macario	Reginaldo Polloni	Italy	7:30.5	Q
2	Arne Serck-Hanssen; Gunnar Sandborg; Sigurd Grønli; Willy Evensen	Thoralf Sandaker	Norway	7:34.7	

==== Quarterfinal 2 ====
Rank	Rowers	Coxswain	Nation	Time	Notes
1	Rudolf Reichling; Erich Schriever; Émile Knecht; Peter Stebler	André Moccand	Switzerland	7:21.8	Q
2	Erwin Bittmann; Karl Sitter; Franz Frauneder; Theodor Obrietan	Karl Riedel	Austria	7:35.9	

==== Quarterfinal 3 ====
Rank	Rowers	Coxswain	Nation	Time	Notes
1	Warren Westlund; Bob Martin; Bob Will; Gordy Giovanelli	Allen Morgan	United States	7:21.4	Q
2	Veikko Lommi; Helge Forsberg; Oiva Lommi; Osrik Forsberg	Veli Autio	Finland	7:36.5	

==== Quarterfinal 4 ====
Rank	Rowers	Coxswain	Nation	Time	Notes
1	Erik Larsen; Børge Raahauge Nielsen; Henry Larsen; Harry Knudsen	Ib Olsen	Denmark	7:21.3	Q
2	António Torres; Delfim José da Silva; José Joaquim Cancela; José do Seixo	Leonel Rêgo	Portugal	7:28.5	

==== Quarterfinal 5 ====
Rank	Rowers	Coxswain	Nation	Time	Notes
1	Jean-Paul Pieddeloup; René Lotti; Gérald Maquat; Jean-Pierre Souche	Marcel Boigegrain	France	7:28.7	Q
2	Ramón Cora; Joaquin Godoy; Manuel Puig; Ramón Puig	Tirso del Junco	Cuba	7:37.2	

==== Quarterfinal 6 ====
Rank	Rowers	Coxswain	Nation	Time	Notes
1	Miklós Zágon; Lajos Nagy; József Sátori; Tibor Nádas	Róbert Zimonyi	Hungary	7:31.6	Q
2	Anthony Purssell; Robert Collins; William Woodward; William Leckie	John Healey	Great Britain	7:36.6	

=== Semifinals ===
==== Semifinal 1 ====
Rank	Rowers	Coxswain	Nation	Time	Notes
1	Warren Westlund; Bob Martin; Bob Will; Gordy Giovanelli	Allen Morgan	United States	7:22.1	Q
2	Jean-Paul Pieddeloup; René Lotti; Gérald Maquat; Jean-Pierre Souche	Marcel Boigegrain	France	7:28.9	

==== Semifinal 2 ====
Rank	Rowers	Coxswain	Nation	Time	Notes
1	Erik Larsen; Børge Raahauge Nielsen; Henry Larsen; Harry Knudsen	Ib Olsen	Denmark	7:31.3	Q
2	Miklós Zágon; Lajos Nagy; József Sátori; Tibor Nádas	Róbert Zimonyi	Hungary	7:46.1	

==== Semifinal 3 ====
Rank	Rowers	Coxswain	Nation	Time	Notes
1	Rudolf Reichling; Erich Schriever; Émile Knecht; Peter Stebler	André Moccand	Switzerland	7:22.0	Q
2	Domenico Cambieri; Riccardo Cerutti; Francesco Gotti; Renato Macario	Reginaldo Polloni	Italy	7:32.8	

=== Final ===
Rank	Rowers	Coxswain	Nation	Time
1st place, gold medalist(s)	Warren Westlund; Bob Martin; Bob Will; Gordy Giovanelli	Allen Morgan	United States	6:50.3
2nd place, silver medalist(s)	Rudolf Reichling; Erich Schriever; Émile Knecht; Peter Stebler	André Moccand	Switzerland	6:53.3
3rd place, bronze medalist(s)	Erik Larsen; Børge Raahauge Nielsen; Henry Larsen; Harry Knudsen	Ib Olsen	Denmark	6:58.6
