= Italy at the 1951 Mediterranean Games =

- IOC code: ITA
- NOC: Italian National Olympic Committee

in Alexandria, Egypt
- Competitors: 99
- Medals Ranked 1st: Gold 27 Silver 22 Bronze 12 Total 61

Mediterranean Games appearances (overview)
- 1951; 1955; 1959; 1963; 1967; 1971; 1975; 1979; 1983; 1987; 1991; 1993; 1997; 2001; 2005; 2009; 2013; 2018; 2022

Italy competed at the 1951 Mediterranean Games in Alexandria, Egypt.

== Medals ==
=== Athletics ===
Sport	Gold	Silver	Bronze	Total
Athletics	6	4	2	12
Totals (1 entries)	6	4	2	12

== Medalists ==
=== Gold ===
- Antonio Siddi — Athletics, 200 metres
- Armando Filiput — Athletics, 400 metres hurdles
- Pino Dordoni — Athletics, 10 km race walk
- Mauro Frizzoni, Franco Leccese, Wolfango Montanari, Antonio Siddi — Athletics, 4 x 100 metres relay
- Giuseppe Tosi — Athletics, Discus throw
- Teseo Taddia — Athletics, Hammer throw
- Antonio Balossi, Silvio Bergamini — Rowing, Double sculls
- Luciano Marion, Giuseppe Ramani, Aldo Tarlao — Rowing, Coxed pairs
- Domenico Cambieri, Guido Cristinelli, Angelo Ghidini, Francesco Gotti, Reginaldo Polloni — Rowing, Coxed fours
- Erio Bettega, Domenico Cambieri, Guido Cristinelli, Angelo Ghidini, Francesco Gotti, Reginaldo Polloni, Giuseppe Ramani, Aldo Tarlao — Rowing, Eights
- Aristide Pozzali — Boxing, –51 kg
- Bruno Visintin — Boxing, –63.5 kg
- Renzo Ruggeri — Boxing, 67 kg
- Gianbattista Alfonsetti — Boxing, –81 kg
- Giacomo Di Segni — Boxing, +81 kg
- Nicola Dioguardi, Mario Favia, Edoardo Mangiarotti, Alessandro Mirandoli, Antonio Spallino — Fencing, Team foil
- Roberto Ferrari, Idalgo Masetto, Ilio Niccolini, Domenico Pace, Mauro Racca — Fencing, Team sabre
- Armando Dallantonio, Edoardo Mangiarotti, Dario Mangiarotti, Mario Mangiarotti, Carlo Pavesi — Fencing, Team épée
- Guido Figone — Gymnastics, Horizontal bar
- Guido Figone — Gymnastics, Parallel bars
- Ignazio Fabra — Wrestling, Greco-Roman –52 kg
- Antonio Randi — Wrestling, Greco-Roman –62 kg
- Antonio Cerroni — Wrestling, Greco-Roman –79 kg
- Umberto Silvestri — Wrestling, Greco-Roman –87 kg
- Guido Fantoni — Wrestling, Greco-Roman, open category
- Adolfo Manfredi — Shooting, Individual trap
- Otello Marini, Edoardo Medi, Giuseppe Melini, Giulio Prati — Shooting, Team trap
