= Serck-Hanssen =

Serck-Hanssen is a Norwegian surname. Notable people with the surname include:

- Arne Serck-Hanssen (1925–2014), Norwegian rower and physician
- Klaus Serck-Hanssen (1886–1980), Norwegian engineer and mining executive
