= Lommi =

Lommi is a surname. Notable people with the surname include:

- Oiva Lommi (1922–2000), Finnish rower
- Veikko Lommi (1917–1989), Finnish rower
