= Hugh Van Zwanenberg =

British sprint canoeist

Hugh Arnold van Zwanenberg (5 November 1916 – 1 September 1984) was a British sprint canoeist who competed in the late 1940s. At the 1948 Summer Olympics in London, he finished seventh, together with Mike Symons, in the C-2 1000 m event. He was born in Fulham, London, and he died in Wargrave.
