= Sandborg =

Sandborg is a Swedish surname. Notable people with the surname include:

- Amanda Sandborg Waesterberg (1842–1918), Swedish composer
- Gunnar Sandborg (1927–2022), Norwegian rower
- Olof Sandborg (1884–1965), Swedish stage and film actor
- Stefan Sandborg (born 1970), Swedish Army major general
