= Jean Dubois =

Jean Dubois may refer to:

- Jean Dubois (canoeist) (1914–?), Belgian sprint canoeist
- Jean Dubois (field hockey) (1926–2021), Belgian field hockey player
- Jean Dubois the Elder (1604–1679), French landscape painter
- John Dubois (1764–1842), also Jean, French Catholic missionary in Virginia and Appalachians, third bishop of New York
- Jean-Antoine Dubois (1765–1848), French Catholic missionary in India
- Jean Dubois (anarchist) (1870–1912), member of the Bonnot Gang
- Jean Dubois (linguist) (1920–2015), French linguist
