= Harry Poulton =

Canadian canoeist

Harry Poulton (May 16, 1919 – October 28, 1981) was a Canadian sprint canoeist. He was born in Saint-Lambert, Quebec and died in Sutton.

Poulton mostly who competed in the late 1940s. He, alongside teammate Douglas Bennett, also from Saint-Lambert, finished fourth in the C-2 1000 m event at the 1948 Summer Olympics in London. He retired from canoeing in 1949.
