= Canoeing at the 1948 Summer Olympics – Men's C-2 1000 metres =

These are the results of the men's C-2 1000 metres competition in canoeing at the 1948 Summer Olympics. The C-2 event is raced by two-man sprint canoes and was held on August 12.

== Final ==
With only eight teams competing, a final was held.

Rank	Canoeists	Country	Time
1st place, gold medalist(s)	Jan Brzák-Felix; Bohumil Kudrna	Czechoslovakia	5:07.1
2nd place, silver medalist(s)	Steven Lysak; Stephen Macknowski	United States	5:08.2
3rd place, bronze medalist(s)	Georges Dransart; Georges Gandil	France	5:15.2
4	Douglas Bennett; Harry Poulton	Canada	5:20.7
5	Karl Molnar; Viktor Salmhofer	Austria	5:37.3
6	Gunnar Johannson; Werner Wettersten	Sweden	5:44.9
7	Mike Symons; Hugh Van Zwanenberg	Great Britain	5:50.9
-	Hubert Coomans; Jean Dubois	Belgium	DNF

The Belgian team did not finish due to a man falling overboard during the final.
