= Sigurd Grønli =

Sigurd Grønli is the name of:

- Sigurd Grønli (footballer) (born 2000), Norwegian footballer
- Sigurd Grønli (rower) (1927–2001), Norwegian rower
