= Hugh Lambie =

Hugh Lambie may refer to:

- Hugh Lambie (mayor) (1904–1980), New Zealand politician
- Hugh Lambie (rower) (1917–2012), Australian rower
