= Ítalo Sartori =

Argentine rower (born 1919)

Personal information
- Full name: Ítalo José Sartori de Zanno
- Nationality: Argentine
- Born: 29 November 1919; Mariano del Friuli, Italy

Sport
- Sport: Rowing

Ítalo Sartori (born 29 November 1919, date of death unknown) was an Argentine rower. He competed in the men's coxed four event at the 1948 Summer Olympics. His team mates were Ricardo Boneo, Carlos Crosta, Carlos Semino and Adolfo Yedro. Sartori is deceased.
