= Delfim José da Silva =

Portuguese rower (1919–1997)

Personal information
- Nationality: Portuguese
- Born: 23 February 1919 Caminha, Portugal
- Died: 20 February 1997 (aged 77) Caminha, Portugal

Sport
- Sport: Rowing

Delfim José da Silva (23 February 1919 – 20 February 1997) was a Portuguese rower. He competed in the men's coxed four event at the 1948 Summer Olympics. Da Silva died in Caminha on 20 February 1997, at the age of 77.
