= Henry Larsen (Danish rower) =

Danish rower (1916–2002)

Olympic medal record

Men's rowing
Bronze medal – third place	1948 London	Coxed four

Henry Christian Larsen (21 July 1916 – 26 September 2002) was a Danish rower who competed in the 1948 Summer Olympics.

He was born in Køge.

In 1948 he was a crew member of the Danish boat which won the bronze medal in the coxed fours event.
