= John Healey (rower) =

British rower (1927–2022)

Personal information
- Full name: John Alexander Dirk Healey
- Nationality: British
- Born: 25 October 1927 Leicestershire, England
- Died: 21 February 2022 (aged 94) Chester, England

Sport
- Sport: Rowing

John Alexander Dirk Healey (25 October 1927 – 21 February 2022) was a British rower. He competed in the men's coxed four event at the 1948 Summer Olympics. Healey died in Chester on 21 February 2022, at the age of 94.
