= Carlos Semino =

Argentine rower

Personal information
- Nationality: Argentine
- Born: 3 May 1929
- Died: 22 January 2014 (aged 84)

Sport
- Sport: Rowing

Carlos Semino (3 May 1929 – 22 January 2014) was an Argentine rower. He competed in the men's coxed four event at the 1948 Summer Olympics. His team mates were Ricardo Boneo, Carlos Crosta, Ítalo Sartori and Adolfo Yedro.
