= Marcel Boigegrain =

French rower

Personal information
- Born: 26 July 1929
- Died: 12 September 1986 (aged 57)

Sport
- Sport: Rowing
Medal record
Men's rowing
Representing France
European Rowing Championships
Gold medal – first place	1947 Lucerne	Coxed four

Marcel Boigegrain (26 July 1929 – 12 September 1986) was a French coxswain. He competed at the 1948 Summer Olympics in London with the men's coxed four where they were eliminated in the semi-finals.
