= Colin Douglas-Smith =

Australian rower (1918–2009)

Personal information
- Nationality: Australian
- Born: 11 July 1918; Geelong, Australia
- Died: 20 October 2009 (aged 91); Fremantle, Western Australia

Sport
- Sport: Rowing

Colin Douglas-Smith (11 July 1918 – 20 October 2009) was an Australian rower. He competed in the men's coxed four event at the 1948 Summer Olympics.

Educated at Geelong Grammar School and the University of Melbourne, where he was a member of Trinity College, he studied Zoology and then Medicine, with his studies interrupted by the Second World War. He served in submarines in the Royal Navy before returning to Australia to complete his medical qualifications. Moving to Western Australia in 1956 after specialized studies in the UK, he became one of Perth's leading obstetricians.
