= Carlos Crosta =

Argentine rower

Personal information
- Full name: Carlos Pedro Crosta Noceti
- Nationality: Argentine

Sport
- Sport: Rowing

Carlos Crosta was an Argentine rower. He competed in the men's coxed four event at the 1948 Summer Olympics. His teammates were Ricardo Boneo, Ítalo Sartori, Carlos Semino and Adolfo Yedro.
