= José do Seixo =

Portuguese rower (1925–1993)

Personal information
- Full name: José Ribeiro do Seixo
- Nationality: Portuguese
- Born: 16 July 1925 Moledo, Portugal
- Died: 3 September 1993 (aged 68) Moledo, Portugal

Sport
- Sport: Rowing

José Ribeiro do Seixo (16 July 1925 – 3 September 1993) was a Portuguese rower. He competed in the men's coxed four event at the 1948 Summer Olympics. Do Seixo died in Moledo on 3 September 1993, at the age of 68.
