= António Torres (rower) =

Portuguese rower (1921–2009)

Personal information
- Full name: António Gonçalves Torres
- Nationality: Portuguese
- Born: 23 November 1921 Caminha, Portugal
- Died: 5 October 2009 (aged 87) Caminha, Portugal

Sport
- Sport: Rowing

António Gonçalves Torres (23 November 1921 – 5 October 2009) was a Portuguese rower. He competed in the men's coxed four event at the 1948 Summer Olympics. Torres died in Caminha on 5 October 2009, at the age of 87.
