= Wal Lambert =

Australian rower

Personal information
- Full name: Walter Joe Lambert
- Nationality: Australian
- Born: 30 April 1916
- Died: 8 October 1993 (aged 77)

Sport
- Sport: Rowing

Walter J Lambert (30 April 1916 – 8 October 1993) was an Australian rower. He competed in the men's coxed four event at the 1948 Summer Olympics.
