= Franz Frauneder =

Austrian rower (1927–2020)

Personal information
- Nationality: Austrian
- Born: 6 December 1927
- Died: 9 July 2020 (aged 92)

Sport
- Sport: Rowing

Franz Frauneder (6 December 1927– 9 July 2020) was an Austrian rower. He competed in the men's coxed four event at the 1948 Summer Olympics.
