= Jack Webster (rower) =

Australian rower (1917–2005)

Personal information
- Full name: John Wilfred Webster
- Nationality: Australian
- Born: 1917
- Died: 6 February 2005 (aged 87–88) Melbourne, Western Australia

Sport
- Sport: Rowing

John Wilfred Webster (1917 – 6 February 2005) was an Australian rower. He competed in the men's coxed four event at the 1948 Summer Olympics.
