= Klaus Hanssen =

Norwegian politician

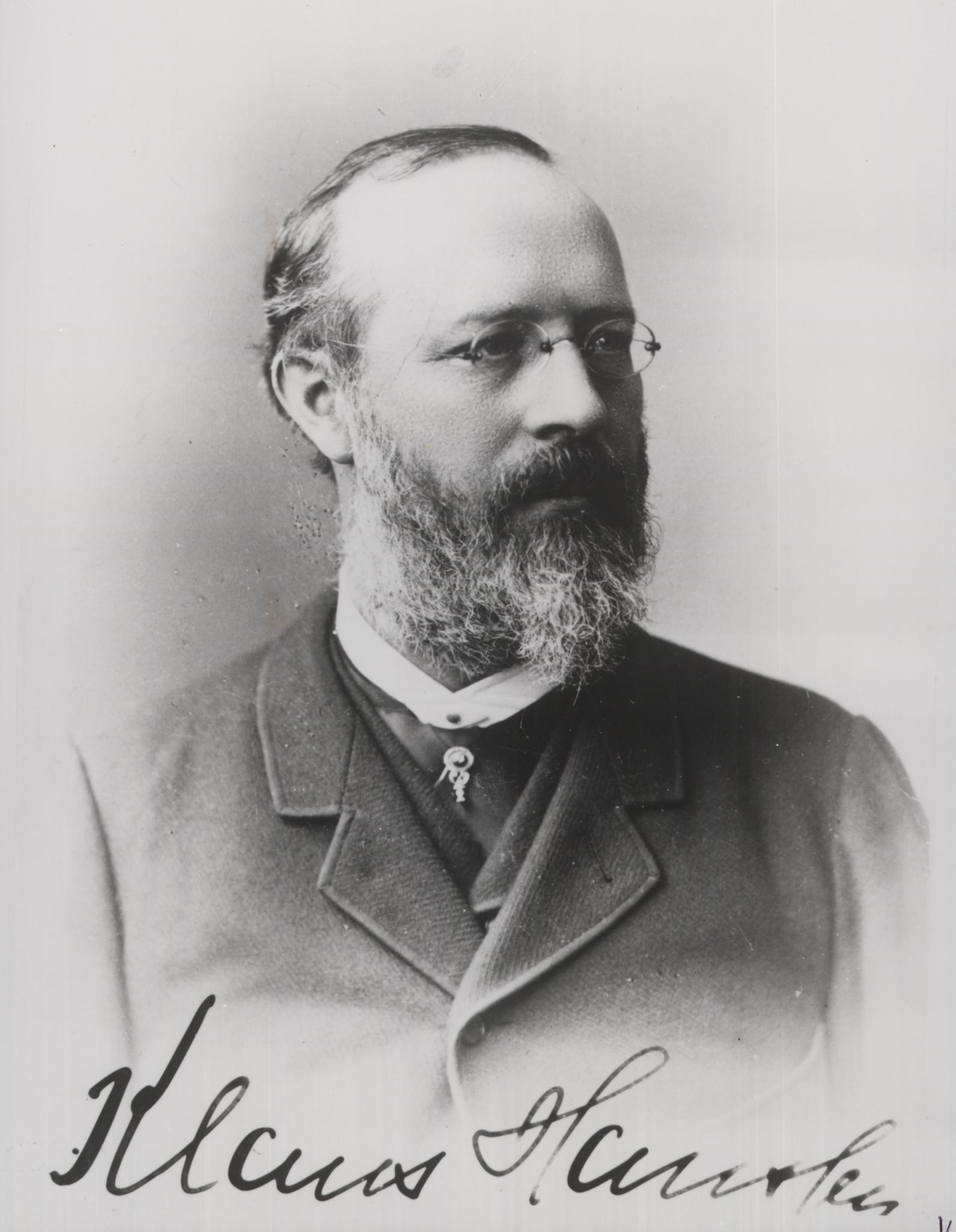

Klaus Hanssen (23 May 1844 - 19 December 1914) was a Norwegian physician and politician for the Liberal Party and the Coalition Party.

He was born in Bergen, a son of merchant Claus Hansen and Elisabeth Schram, and was a brother of Gerhard Armauer Hansen. He was first married to Ida Christine Johannessen, and a second time to Dorothea Marstrand Serck. He was the father of mining executive Klaus Serck-Hanssen, and grandfather of Arne Serck-Hanssen.

He served as a deputy representative to the Norwegian Parliament during the terms 1889–1891, representing the constituency Bergen. He was a member of Bergen city council for several years, and served as mayor in 1894. He later joined the Coalition Party, and served as a parliamentary deputy again during the term 1904–1906.

Born in Bergen, he graduated as cand.med. in 1872 and worked as a physician the rest of his professional life.

Preceded by Christian Michelsen	Mayor of Bergen; 1894	Succeeded by Christian Michelsen
