= Renato Macario =

Italian rower

Personal information
- Born: 10 June 1920 Lovere, Italy
- Died: 30 May 2011 (aged 90) Lovere, Italy

Sport
- Sport: Rowing
Medal record
Men's rowing
Representing Italy
European Rowing Championships
Silver medal – second place	1947 Lucerne	Coxed four

Renato Macario (10 June 1920 – 30 May 2011) was an Italian rower. He competed at the 1948 Summer Olympics in London with the men's coxed four where they were eliminated in the semi-final.
