= William Stevenson (canoeist) =

Canadian canoeist (1923–1992)

William Robert Stevenson (June 9, 1923 – December 11, 1992) was a Canadian sprint canoeist who competed from the late 1940s to the late 1950s. Competing in two Summer Olympics, he earned his best finish of fifth in the C-2 10000 m event at London in 1948. Stevenson died in Picton, Ontario on December 11, 1992, at the age of 69.
