= Bill Bertani =

American soccer player

William Joseph Bertani (September 8, 1919 – December 12, 1988 in Fulton, Missouri) was an American soccer player who was a member of the 1948 U.S. Olympic soccer team. He also earned two caps with the U.S. national team that year.

== Club career ==
Bertani spent his playing career in St. Louis, Missouri. He was with the St. Louis Raiders during the 1947–1948 season. In 1948, he joined St. Louis Simpkins-Ford and was a member of the Simpkins team which won both the 1948 and 1950 National Challenge Cup. He was the second leading scorer with seven goals during the 1947–1948 St. Louis Major League season.

Bertani was inducted into the St. Louis Soccer Hall of Fame in 1975.

== National and Olympic teams ==
In 1948, Bertani was selected for the U.S. soccer team at the Summer Olympics. Bertani played in the 9–0 loss to Italy in the first round of the Olympics, which eliminated the U.S. from the tournament.

Following the Olympics, the U.S. played two full internationals, an 11–0 loss to Norway, followed by a 5–0 loss to Northern Ireland on August 11, 1948.
