= Jean-Paul Pieddeloup =

French rower

Personal information
- Full name: Gaston Jean-Paul Pieddeloup
- Nationality: French
- Born: 28 October 1921; Paris, France
- Died: 14 December 2009 (aged 88); Saint-Maur-des-Fossés, France

Sport
- Sport: Rowing

Gaston Jean-Paul Pieddeloup (28 October 1921 – 14 December 2009) was a French rower. He competed in the men's coxed four event at the 1948 Summer Olympics.
