= Karl Riedel =

Austrian rower (1913–1991)

Personal information
- Full name: Karl Adolf Riedel
- Nationality: Austrian
- Born: 13 March 1913 Vienna, Austria
- Died: 21 May 1991 (aged 78) Klagenfurt, Austria

Sport
- Sport: Rowing

Karl Adolf Riedel (13 March 1913 – 21 May 1991) was an Austrian rower. He competed in the men's coxed four event at the 1948 Summer Olympics. Riedel died in Klagenfurt on 21 May 1991, at the age of 78.
