= Rolf Valtin =

American soccer player (1925–2018)

Rolf Valtin (January 4, 1925 – August 1, 2018) was an American soccer forward who was a member of the 1948 U.S. Olympic soccer team. Valtin (then Weigelmesser) fled Hamburg, Germany in 1938 and came to America as a Jewish refugee. In World War II, Valtin served in the 16th Regiment of the First Infantry Division as an interrogator, including landing on Omaha Beach during the invasion of Normandy. He died in August 2018 at the age of 93.

== Playing career ==
Valtin attended Swarthmore College where he earned first team All American honors in 1947. In 1948 he was selected as a member of the American soccer team at the 1948 Summer Olympics. The United States lost to Italy, 9–0, in the first round. When the team returned to the United States, it played two games against Israel. Valtin played in both, a 4–1 victory on October 10, 1948, in which Valtin scored, and a second victory seven days later. Neither, however, are considered full internationals. In 1949 Valtin played for the Philadelphia Americans of the American Soccer League.
