= Émile Knecht =

Swiss rower (1923–2019)

Emil Knecht
Personal information
- Full name: Emil Adolf Knecht-Keller
- Born: 18 December 1923 Zürich, Switzerland
- Died: 4 May 2019 (aged 95) Küsnacht, Zürich, Switzerland

Sport
- Sport: Rowing
Medal record
Men's rowing
Representing Switzerland
Olympic Games
Silver medal – second place	1948 London	Coxed four
European Rowing Championships
Bronze medal – third place	1947 Lucerne	Eight
Gold medal – first place	1951 Mâcon	Double sculls

Emil Adolf Knecht-Keller (also spelled Émile, 18 December 1923 – 4 May 2019) was a Swiss rower who competed in the 1948 Summer Olympics and in the 1952 Summer Olympics. In 1948 he was a crew member of the Swiss boat which won the silver medal in the coxed fours event. Four years later he was eliminated with his partner Peter Stebler in the first round repêchage of the double sculls event.
