= Riccardo Cerutti =

Italian rower

Personal information
- Born: 7 September 1921 Castro, Lombardy, Italy
- Died: 7 July 1999 (aged 77) Lovere, Italy

Sport
- Sport: Rowing
Medal record
Men's rowing
Representing Italy
European Rowing Championships
Silver medal – second place	1947 Lucerne	Coxed four

Riccardo Cerutti (7 September 1921 – 7 July 1999) was an Italian rower. He competed at the 1948 Summer Olympics in London with the men's coxed four where they were eliminated in the semi-final. Cerutti died in Lovere on 7 July 1999, at the age of 77.
