= Leonel Rêgo =

Portuguese rower (1922–2006)

Personal information
- Full name: Leonel Gonçalves Rêgo
- Nationality: Portuguese
- Born: 23 June 1922 Caminha, Portugal
- Died: 15 November 2006 (aged 84) Viana do Castelo, Portugal

Sport
- Sport: Rowing

Leonel Gonçalves Rêgo (23 June 1922 – 15 November 2006) was a Portuguese rower. He competed in the men's coxed four event at the 1948 Summer Olympics. Rêgo died in Viana do Castelo on 15 November 2006, at the age of 84.
