= Greece at the 2001 Mediterranean Games =

- IOC code: GRE
- NOC: Hellenic Olympic Committee

in Tunis
- Competitors: 356
- Medals Ranked 5th: Gold 28 Silver 33 Bronze 27 Total 88

Mediterranean Games appearances (overview)
- 1951; 1955; 1959; 1963; 1967; 1971; 1975; 1979; 1983; 1987; 1991; 1993; 1997; 2001; 2005; 2009; 2013; 2018; 2022

Greece (GRE) competed with a team of 356 athletes at the 2001 Mediterranean Games in Tunis, Tunisia. The team achieved the best result for Greece in the history of the Games, winning 28 gold medals and 88 medals overall.

== Medals ==
=== Gold ===
Athletics

- 100m: Aristotelis Gavelas
- 400 metres hurdles: Periklis Iakovakis
- 4x400 metres relay: Stylianos Dimotsios, Ioannis Lessis, Georgios Ikonomidis, Georgios Doupis
- Decathlon: Prodromos Korkizoglou
- Discus throw: Areti Ampatzi

Gymnastics

- Rings: Dimosthenis Tampakos
- Parallel bars: Vasileios Tsolakidis
- Horizontal bar: Vlasios Maras

Karate

- Men's open: Konstantinos Papadopoulos
- Women's (– 65 kg): Theodora Dougeni

Weightlifting

- Men's (– 62 kg c&j): Leonidas Sabanis
- Men's (– 94 kg snatch): Leonidas Kokas
- Men's (– 94 kg c&j): Leonidas Kokas
- Women's (– 63 kg snatch): Anastasia Tsakiri
- Women's (– 63 kg c&j): Anastasia Tsakiri
- Women's (– 69 kg c&j): Maria Tatsi
- Women's (– 75 kg c&j): Filippia Kochliaridou
- Women's (– +75 kg snatch): Katerina Roditi

Wrestling

- Men's (– 54 kg): Amiran Kardanov
- Men's (– 63 kg): Besik Aslanasvili
- Men's (– 97 kg): Aftandil Xanthopoulos
- Women's (– 51 kg): Sofia Poumpouridou

Swimming

- Men's 1500m Freestyle: Spyridon Gianniotis
- Men's 4x200 Freestyle: Dimitrios Manganas, Nikolaos Xylouris, Athanasios Oikonomou, Spyridon Gianniotis
- Women's 200m Freestyle: Zoi Dimoschaki

Tennis

- Men's Singles: Konstantinos Economidis
- Men's Doubles: Konstantinos Economidis, Anastasios Vasiliadis
- Women's Doubles: Eleni Daniilidou, Maria Pavlidou

== See also ==
- Greece at the 2000 Summer Olympics
- Greece at the 2004 Summer Olympics
