= Canoeing at the 1948 Summer Olympics – Men's C-2 10000 metres =

These are the results of the Men's C-2 10000 metres competition in canoeing at the 1948 Summer Olympics. The C-2 event is raced by two-man sprint canoes. Heats and final took place on August 11.

== Final ==
With only six teams competing, a final was held.

Rank	Canoeists	Country	Time
1st place, gold medalist(s)	Steven Lysak; Stephen Macknowski	United States	55:55.4
2nd place, silver medalist(s)	Václáv Havel; Jiří Pecka	Czechoslovakia	57:38.5
3rd place, bronze medalist(s)	Georges Dransart; Georges Gandil	France	58:00.8
4	Karl Molnar; Viktor Salmhofer	Austria	58:59.3
5	Bert Oldershaw; William Stevenson	Canada	59:48.4
6	Gunnar Johansson; Werner Wettersten	Sweden	1:03:34.4
