= Rudolf Reichling =

Swiss rower and politician

Olympic medal record

Men's rowing
Silver medal – second place	1948 London	Coxed four

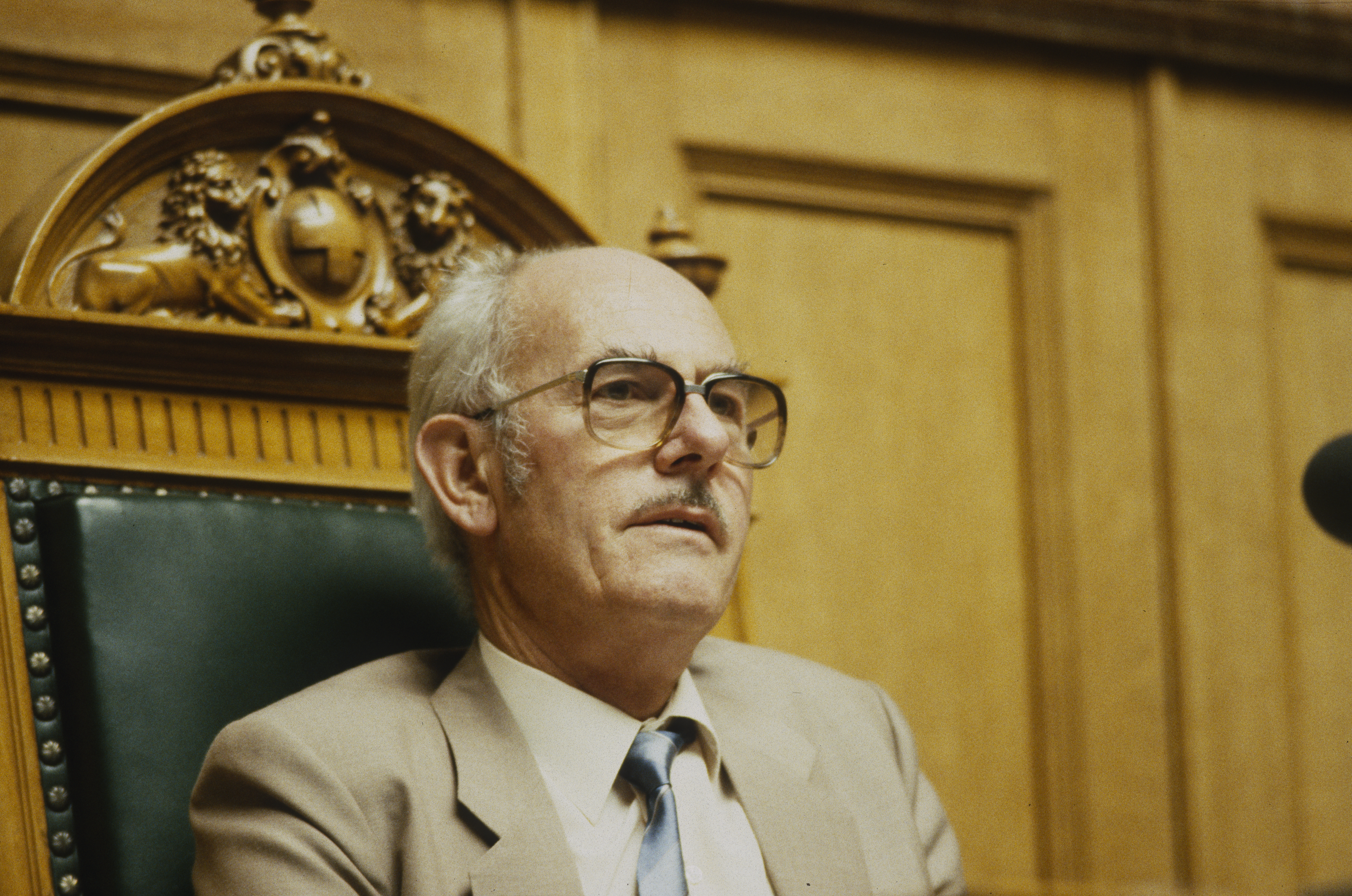
Rudolf Reichling

Rudolf Reichling (23 September 1924 – 23 November 2014) was a Swiss politician and President of the Swiss National Council (1987/1988). As a rower, Reichling competed in the 1948 Summer Olympics. He was a crew member of the Swiss boat which won the silver medal in the coxed fours event. His father Rudolf Reichling (1890-1977) had presided over the National Council in 1936/1937.

Preceded by Jean-Jacques Cevey	President of the National Council; 1987/1988	Succeeded by Josef Iten
