= Peter Stebler =

Swiss rower

Personal information
- Born: Peter Hermann Stebler; 7 May 1927 Zürich, Switzerland
- Died: 15 September 2010 (aged 83) Küsnacht, Switzerland

Sport
- Sport: Rowing
Medal record
Men's rowing
Representing Switzerland
Olympic Games
Silver medal – second place	1948 London	Coxed four
European Rowing Championships
Gold medal – first place	1951 Mâcon	Double sculls
Gold medal – first place	1953 Copenhagen	Double sculls
Silver medal – second place	1954 Amsterdam	Double sculls

Peter Hermann Stebler (7 May 1927 – 15 September 2010) was a Swiss rower who competed in the 1948 Summer Olympics and in the 1952 Summer Olympics. He was born in Zürich. In 1948 he was a crew member of the Swiss boat which won the silver medal in the coxed four event. Four years later he was eliminated with his partner Émile Knecht in the first round repêchage of the double sculls event.
