= Erwin Bittmann =

Austrian rower (1928–2019)

Personal information
- Nationality: Austrian
- Born: 30 January 1928; Klagenfurt, Austria
- Died: 5 August 2019 (aged 91); Klagenfurt, Austria

Sport
- Sport: Rowing

Erwin Bittmann (30 January 1928 – 5 August 2019) was an Austrian rower. He competed in the men's coxed four event at the 1948 Summer Olympics.
