= Greece at the Mediterranean Games =

- IOC code: GRE
- NOC: Hellenic Olympic Committee
- Medals Ranked 5th: Gold 228 Silver 284 Bronze 369 Total 881

Mediterranean Games appearances (overview)
- 1951; 1955; 1959; 1963; 1967; 1971; 1975; 1979; 1983; 1987; 1991; 1993; 1997; 2001; 2005; 2009; 2013; 2018; 2022; 2026

Greece has competed at every celebration of the Mediterranean Games since the 1951 Mediterranean Games. As of 2026, Greek athletes have won a total of 881 medals. The country's ranking in the history of the Games is the 5th place.

== Medal tables ==
=== Medals by Mediterranean Games ===
Host nation

Games	Participants	Gold	Silver	Bronze	Total	Rank
1951 Alexandria	129	4	9	8	21	5
1955 Barcelona	73	1	7	8	16	6
1959 Beirut	69	8	9	13	30	6
1963 Naples	72	0	0	5	5	10
1967 Tunis		5	6	12	23	7
1971 İzmir	159	8	8	24	40	5
1975 Algiers	169	9	12	16	37	6
1979 Split	195	7	10	13	30	5
1983 Casablanca	198	11	10	13	34	6
1987 Latakia	213	7	14	16	37	8
1991 Athens	437	9	21	30	60	6
1993 Languedoc-Roussillon	256	17	25	24	66	4
1997 Bari	306	19	22	21	62	4
2001 Tunis	356	28	33	27	88	5
2005 Almería	341	13	15	31	59	6
2009 Pescara	391	19	14	31	64	5
2013 Mersin	189	15	18	26	59	6
2018 Tarragona	299	12	14	22	48	6
2022 Oran	174	10	11	10	31	8
2026 Taranto	281	26	26	19	71	3
Total		228	284	369	881	5

=== Medals by sport ===
Sport	Gold	Silver	Bronze	Total
Athletics	63	74	79	216
Weightlifting	37	34	23	94
Swimming	28	44	55	127
Wrestling	27	53	66	146
Rowing	17	11	9	37
Artistic gymnastics	9	11	15	35
Karate	6	5	8	19
Tennis	6	3	2	11
Sailing	5	5	10	20
Finswimming	5	2	2	9
Boxing	4	4	35	43
Judo	4	2	13	19
Shooting	3	13	13	29
Table tennis	2	1	4	7
Football	2	0	1	3
Basketball	1	4	4	9
Fencing	1	0	3	4
Volleyball	0	4	4	8
Taekwondo	0	2	4	6
Water polo	0	1	5	6
Cycling	0	1	3	4
Handball	0	1	1	2
Beach volleyball	0	1	0	1
Badminton	0	0	2	2
Totals (24 entries)	220	276	361	857

== See also ==
- Greece at the Olympics
- Greece at the Paralympics
- Sport in Greece
