= Ib Olsen =

Danish rower (1929–2009)

Olympic medal record

Men's rowing

Representing Denmark

Olympic Games
| Bronze medal – third place | 1948 London | Coxed four |

Jørgen Ib Olsen (9 November 1929 in Højelse, Køge Municipality, Denmark – 9 November 2009 in Sorø, Denmark) was a Danish rower who competed in the 1948 Summer Olympics.

In 1948 he was the coxswain of the Danish boat that won the bronze medal in the coxed four event.
