= Osrik Forsberg =

Finnish rower

Personal information
- Nationality: Finnish
- Born: 26 September 1912
- Died: 11 February 1994 (aged 81)

Sport
- Sport: Rowing

Osrik Forsberg (26 September 1912 – 11 February 1994) was a Finnish rower. He competed in the men's coxed four event at the 1948 Summer Olympics.
