= Greece at the 1951 Mediterranean Games =

- IOC code: GRE
- NOC: Hellenic Olympic Committee

in Alexandria, Egypt
- Competitors: 129
- Medals Ranked 5th: Gold 4 Silver 9 Bronze 8 Total 21

Mediterranean Games appearances (overview)
- 1951; 1955; 1959; 1963; 1967; 1971; 1975; 1979; 1983; 1987; 1991; 1993; 1997; 2001; 2005; 2009; 2013; 2018; 2022

Greece competed at the 1951 Mediterranean Games in Alexandria, Egypt.

== Medals by sport ==
Sport	Gold	Silver	Bronze	Total
Athletics	3	7	3	13
Football	1	0	0	1
Rowing	0	1	2	3
Wrestling	0	1	1	2
Water polo	0	1	0	1
Shooting	0	0	1	1
Totals (6 entries)	4	10	7	21
