= Harry Knudsen =

Danish rower (1919–1998)

Olympic medal record

Men's rowing

Representing Denmark

Olympic Games
Bronze medal – third place	1948 London	Coxed four

Harry Madsen Knudsen (4 March 1919 – 1 September 1998) was a Danish rower who competed in the 1948 Summer Olympics.

He was born in Højelse, Køge Municipality. In 1948 he was a crew member of the Danish boat which won the bronze medal in the coxed four event.
