= Gérald Maquat =

French rower (born 1912)

Personal information
- Nationality: French
- Born: 15 July 1912 Tavannes, Switzerland

Sport
- Sport: Rowing

Gérald Paul Maquat (born 15 July 1912, date of death unknown) was a French rower. He competed in the men's coxed four event at the 1948 Summer Olympics.
