= Karl Sitter =

Austrian rower (1928–2020)

Personal information
- Nationality: Austrian
- Born: 6 June 1928
- Died: 2 November 2020 (aged 92)

Sport
- Sport: Rowing

Karl Sitter (6 June 1928 – 2 November 2020) was an Austrian rower. He competed in the men's coxed four event at the 1948 Summer Olympics.
