= Jakov Labura =

Croatian rower

Personal information
- Nationality: Croatian
- Born: 16 July 1927; Šibenik, Yugoslavia
- Died: 12 August 2012 (aged 85); Šibenik, Croatia

Sport
- Sport: Rowing

Jakov Labura (16 July 1927 – 12 August 2012) was a Croatian rower. He competed in the men's coxed four event at the 1948 Summer Olympics.
