= Daniel Krnćević =

Croatian rower

Personal information
- Nationality: Croatian
- Born: 14 February 1929; Šibenik, Yugoslavia
- Died: 15 February 1983 (aged 54); Šibenik, Yugoslavia

Sport
- Sport: Rowing

Daniel Krnćević (14 February 1929 – 15 February 1983) was a Croatian rower. He competed in the men's coxed four event at the 1948 Summer Olympics.
