= William Woodward (rower) =

British rower

Personal information
- Nationality: British
- Born: 14 October 1920 Emmaville, New South Wales, Australia
- Died: 18 January 1987 (aged 66) Wandsworth, England

Sport
- Sport: Rowing

William Winslow Woodward (14 October 1920 – 18 January 1987) was an Australian surgeon. He competed in the men's coxed four event at the 1948 Summer Olympics.

He was educated at Brasenose College, Oxford as a Rhodes Scholar. After his Olympic appearance, he became Fellow of the Royal Australasian College of Surgeons and Fellow of the Royal College of Surgeons and worked as a surgeon in Tasmania.
