= William Leckie =

British rower (1928–2023)

Personal information
- Nationality: British
- Born: 25 August 1928
- Died: 24 February 2023 (aged 94); Australia

Sport
- Sport: Rowing

William Leckie (25 August 1928 – 24 February 2023) was a British rower. He competed in the men's coxed four event at the 1948 Summer Olympics. Leckie died in Australia on 24 February 2023, at the age of 94.
