= José Joaquim Cancela =

Portuguese rower (1925–2003)

Personal information
- Nationality: Portuguese
- Born: 16 July 1925 Lanhelas, Caminha, Viana do Castelo, Portugal
- Died: 22 November 2003 (aged 78) Lanhelas, Caminha, Viana do Castelo, Portugal

Sport
- Sport: Rowing

José Joaquim Cancela (16 July 1925 – 22 November 2003) was a Portuguese rower. He competed in the men's coxed four event at the 1948 Summer Olympics. Cancela died in Lanhelas, Caminha, Viana do Castelo on 22 November 2003, at the age of 78.
