= Veli Autio =

Finnish rower

Personal information
- Nationality: Finnish
- Born: 2 September 1909
- Died: 13 August 1993 (aged 83)

Sport
- Sport: Rowing

Veli Autio (2 September 1909 – 13 August 1993) was a Finnish rower. He competed in the men's coxed four event at the 1948 Summer Olympics.
