= Adolfo Yedro =

Argentine rower

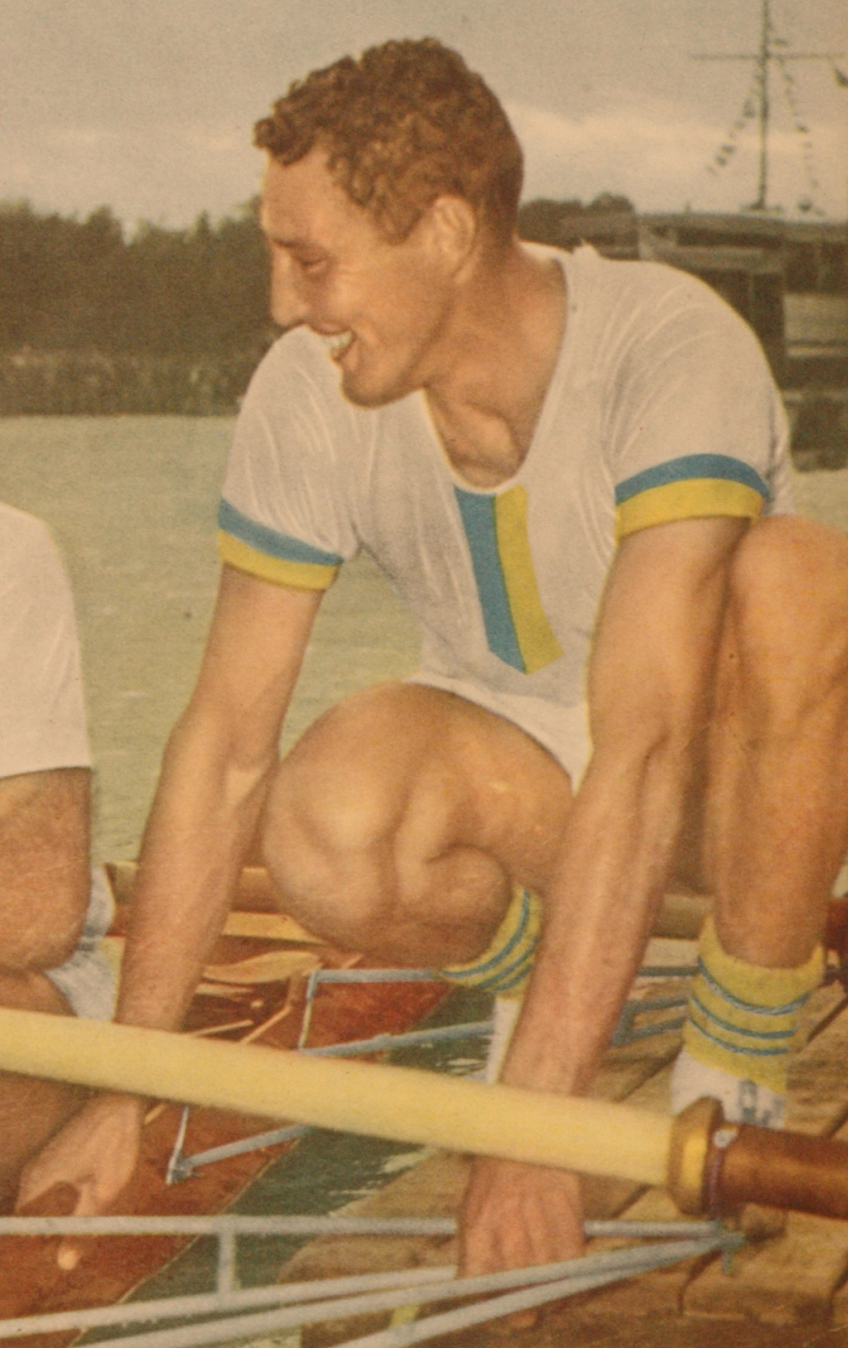

Personal information
- Born: 14 December 1922; Rosario, Santa Fe, Argentina
- Died: 20 February 1989 (aged 66)

Sport
- Sport: Rowing

Adolfo Luis Yedro (14 December 1922 – 20 February 1989) was an Argentine rower. He competed in the men's coxed four event at the 1948 Summer Olympics. His team mates were Ricardo Boneo, Carlos Crosta, Ítalo Sartori and Carlos Semino.
