= Herfølge =

Suburb of Køge, Denmark

Coordinates: 55.41148°N 12.14092°E

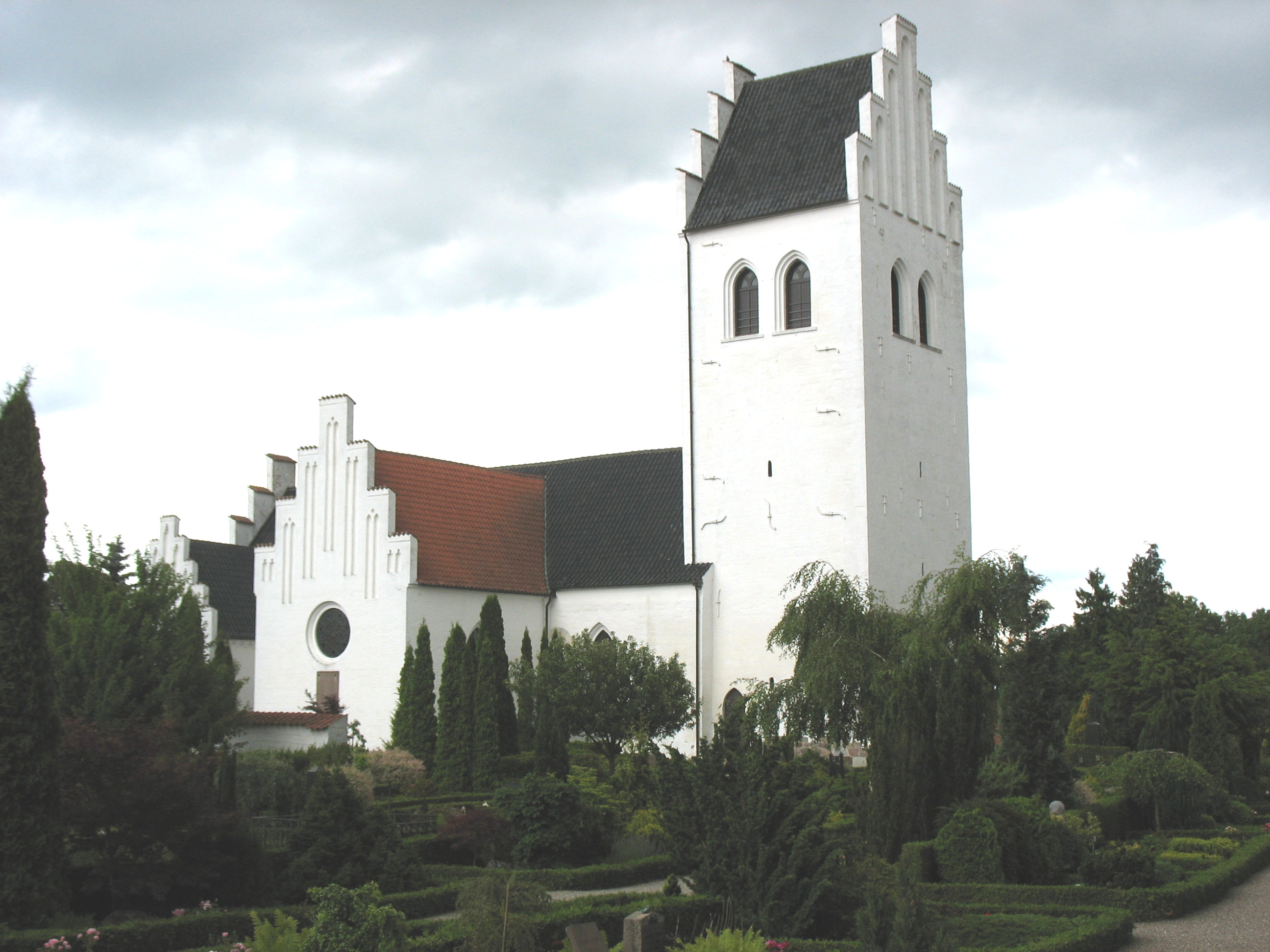
Herfølge Church

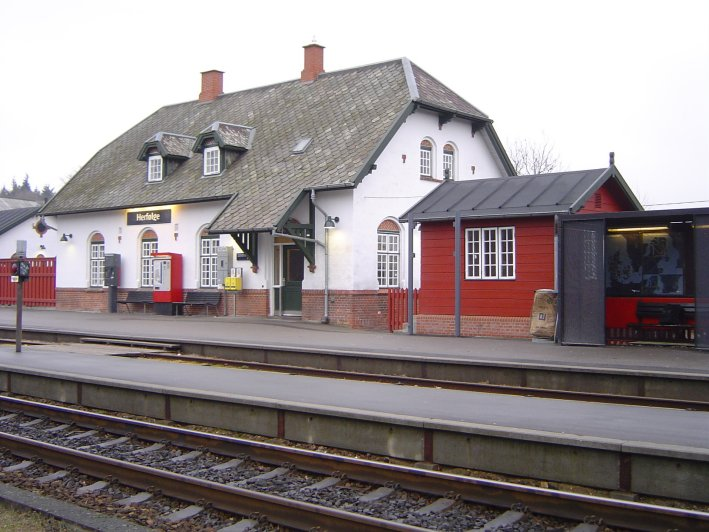
Herfølge railway station

Herfølge is a suburb of the town of Køge, Denmark, located about 5 kilometers south of central Køge, and is a part of Køge Municipality. The suburb is connected to Køge and Næstved by the Lille Syd railway line.

== Herfølge Church ==
Herfølge Church dates from around 1200 with several later additions.

== Residential areas ==
Holmebækhuse, is well known settlement in Herfølge, build in 1982 the townhouses/ terrace houses are located south east of Herfølge, and buildings are divided in three areas, in three colours red, green and most commonly blue.

Svanemarken, Svanelunden and Svaneengen are known as the first residential area in all of Denmark, with the so called “svanemærket” (translates to swanlabel?) which is a climate label that means the houses there guarantees low energy use, good indoor climate, and materials good for climate. The houses in this area is advanced architecture and traditional big houses, and they are the most expensive houses in Herfølge.

The settlement of Tinggården, originally built in 1978 as a result of a competition from the Danish Ministry of Housing on alternative settlements and dwellings, is located on the eastern outskirts of Herfølge.

In recent years, a newer settlement called "Fremtidens Parcelhuse" (English: Future Single Family Houses), consisting of 80 various low energy houses, has started construction south of Tinggården.

== Sports ==
Herfølge is mainly known for the professional football club Herfølge BK, that clinched the Danish National Football Championship title in 1999–2000 season.

== Notable people ==
- Caroline Wozniacki (born 11. juli 1990 in Odense) the famous tennis player, Caroline Wozniacki of Polish descent, used to live in Herfølge, where she started her tennis career, at 7 years in Køge tennis club, and went to local Herfølge skole.
- Erik Larsen (born 1928 in Herfølge – 1952) a Danish rower, team bronze medallist at the 1948 Summer Olympics
- Peter Aalbæk Jensen (born 1956 in Osted) a Danish film producer is a resident of Herfølge.
- Kim Daugaard (born 1974 in Herfølge) former footballer, 336 caps with Brøndby IF, now assistant coach for HB Køge
