= Helge Forsberg =

Finnish rower (1920–2005)

Personal information
- Nationality: Finnish
- Born: 13 November 1920
- Died: 3 January 2005 (aged 84)

Sport
- Sport: Rowing

Helge Forsberg (13 November 1920 – 3 January 2005) was a Finnish rower. He competed in the men's coxed four event at the 1948 Summer Olympics.
