= Erik Larsen (rower) =

Danish rower (1928–1952)

Personal information
- Born: 20 February 1928 Herfølge
- Died: 10 April 1952 (aged 24) Ringsted

Sport
- Sport: Rowing
Medal record
Men's rowing
Representing Denmark
Olympic Games
Bronze medal – third place	1948 London	Coxed four
European Rowing Championships
Gold medal – first place	1950 Milan	Single sculls
Gold medal – first place	1951 Mâcon	Single scull

Erik Christian Larsen (20 February 1928 – 10 April 1952) was a Danish rower who competed in the 1948 Summer Olympics.

He was born in Herfølge, Køge Municipality and died in Ringsted, Region Sjælland. In 1948 he was a crew member of the Danish boat which won the bronze medal in the coxed four event. He won a gold medal in single scull at the 1950 European Rowing Championships in Milan.
