= Erich Schriever =

Swiss rower (1924–2020)

Personal information
- Born: 6 August 1924
- Died: 29 April 2020 (aged 95)

Sport
- Sport: Rowing
Medal record
Men's rowing
Representing Switzerland
Olympic Games
Silver medal – second place	1948 London	Coxed four
European Rowing Championships
Gold medal – first place	1953 Copenhagen	Double sculls
Silver medal – second place	1954 Amsterdam	Double scull

Erich Schriever (6 August 1924 – 29 April 2020) was a Swiss rower who competed in the 1948 Summer Olympics. In 1948 he was a crew member of the Swiss boat which won the silver medal in the coxed four event.
