= Greece at the 2009 Mediterranean Games =

- IOC code: GRE
- NOC: Hellenic Olympic Committee

in Pescara
- Competitors: 391
- Medals Ranked 5th: Gold 19 Silver 14 Bronze 31 Total 64

Mediterranean Games appearances (overview)
- 1951; 1955; 1959; 1963; 1967; 1971; 1975; 1979; 1983; 1987; 1991; 1993; 1997; 2001; 2005; 2009; 2013; 2018; 2022

Greece competed at the 2009 Mediterranean Games in Pescara, Italy.

== Medalists ==
=== Gold ===
Gymnastics

- Pommel Horse: Eleftherios Kosmidis
- Balance beam: Vasiliki Millousi

Athletics

- 100 metres: Georgia Kokloni
- Pole vault: Nikoleta Kyriakopoulou
- Triple jump: Athanasia Perra
- Javelin throw: Voisava Lika

Rowing

- Single sculls: Vasileios Polymeros
- Lightweight Single Sculls: Giorgos Christou
- Lightweight Single Sculls: Alexandra Tsiavou
- LW2x: Christina Giazitzidou, Triantafyllia Kalampoka

Table tennis

- Men's Singles: Panagiotis Gionis

Wrestling

- Men's Greco-Roman 66 kg: Gievgkeni Pentorets

Karate

- Kumite −67 kg: Dimitrios Triantafyllis
- Kumite −84 kg: Konstantinos Papadopoulos

Judo

- −90 kg: Ilias Iliadis
- −57 kg: Ioulieta Boukouvala
