= Šime Bujas =

Croatian rower (1927–2001)

Personal information
- Nationality: Croatian
- Born: 5 January 1927; Šibenik, Yugoslavia
- Died: 4 February 2001 (aged 74); Šibenik, Croatia

Sport
- Sport: Rowing

Šime Bujas (5 January 1927 – 4 February 2001) was a Croatian rower. He competed in the men's coxed four event at the 1948 Summer Olympics.
