= André Moccand =

Swiss rower (born 1931)

Olympic medal record

Men's rowing
Silver medal – second place	1948 London	Coxed four

André Moccand (born 25 January 1931) is a Swiss rower who competed in the 1948 Summer Olympics. In 1948 he was the coxswain of the Swiss boat which won the silver medal in the coxed fours event.
