= Willy Evensen =

Norwegian rower

Personal information
- Nationality: Norwegian
- Born: 31 March 1919; Oslo, Norway
- Died: 22 November 1997 (aged 78); Nesodden, Norway

Sport
- Sport: Rowing

Willy Evensen (31 March 1919 – 22 November 1997) was a Norwegian rower. He competed in the men's coxed four event at the 1948 Summer Olympics.
