= Børge Raahauge Nielsen =

Danish rower (1920–2010)

Medal record

Men's rowing

Representing Denmark

Olympic Games
Bronze medal – third place	1948 London	Coxed four

Børge Daniel Raahauge Nielsen (26 March 1920 in Køge, Denmark – 5 October 2010 in Odense, Denmark) was a Danish rower who competed in the 1948 Summer Olympics.

In 1948 he was a crew member of the Danish boat which won the bronze medal in the coxed four event.

Professionally he was a police officer.
