= Theodor Obrietan =

Austrian rower (1927–2004)

Personal information
- Nationality: Austrian
- Born: 2 December 1927 Klagenfurt, Austria
- Died: 11 December 2004 (aged 77) Klagenfurt, Austria

Sport
- Sport: Rowing

Theodor Obrietan (2 December 1927 – 11 December 2004) was an Austrian rower. He competed in the men's coxed four event at the 1948 Summer Olympics. Obrietan died in Klagenfurt on 11 December 2004, at the age of 77.
