= Arne Serck-Hanssen =

Norwegian rower and physician

Arne Serck-Hanssen (28 February 1925 – 27 November 2014) was a Norwegian rower and physician.

He was born in Løkken Verk, a son of mining executive Klaus Serck-Hanssen and Gunvor Quenild, and grandson of physician and politician Klaus Hanssen. He represented the Oslo sports club Christiania RK. He participated in the coxed four event (as stroke) at the 1948 Summer Olympics. During the winter he participated in cross-country skiing and ski jumping.

During the occupation of Norway by Nazi Germany Serck-Hanssen was a part of the Norwegian resistance movement. He was arrested by the Nazi authorities in April 1942, imprisoned in Bredtveit concentration camp until June, then in Grini concentration camp. He was sent to Sachsenhausen concentration camp in September 1943, and held there until the camp was liberated.

Serck-Hanssen took his medical education at Durham University. He died in 2014.
