= Bob Will =

American rower (1925–2019)

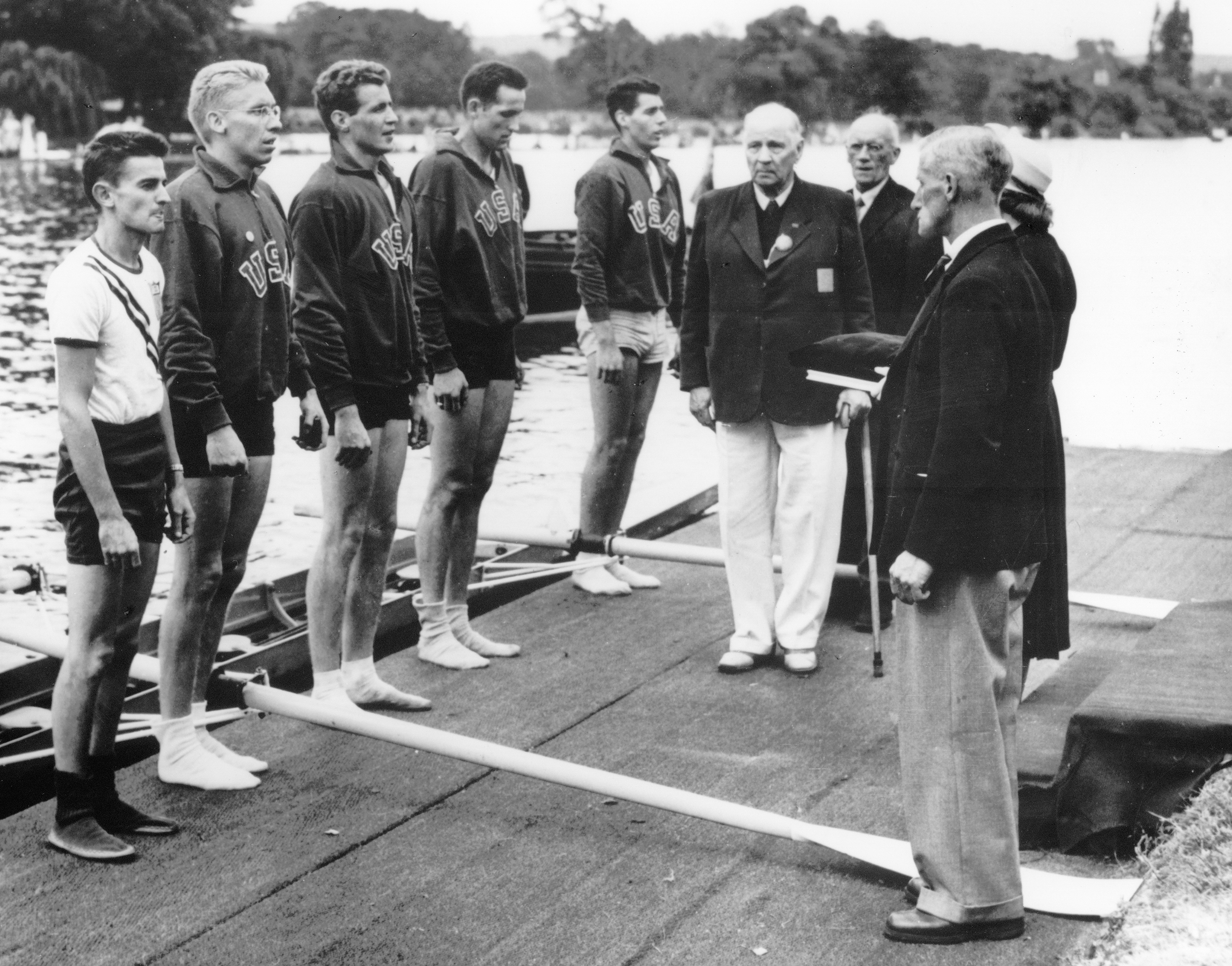
- Will (4th left) 1948 medal ceremony

Personal information
- Full name: Robert Ide Will
- Born: April 20, 1925 Seattle, Washington, U.S.
- Died: October 14, 2019 (aged 94)
Medal record
Men's rowing
Representing the United States
Olympic Games
Gold medal – first place	1948 London	Coxed four

Robert Ide Will (April 20, 1925 – October 14, 2019) was an American rower who competed in the 1948 Summer Olympics. He was born in Seattle, Washington. In 1948, he was a crew member of the American boat which won the gold medal in the coxed fours event.
