= Hugh Lambie (rower) =

Australian rower

Personal information
- Nationality: Australian
- Born: 3 September 1917; Melbourne, Australia
- Died: 26 December 2012 (aged 95); Sandstone Point, Queensland, Australia

Sport
- Sport: Rowing

Hugh T Lambie (3 September 1917 – 26 December 2012) was an Australian rower. He competed in the men's coxed four event at the 1948 Summer Olympics.
