= Stephen Macknowski =

American canoeist

Medal record

Men's canoeing

Representing the United States

Olympic Games
Gold medal – first place	1948 London	C-2 10000 m
Silver medal – second place	1948 London	C-2 1000 m

Stephen Albert "Steve" Macknowski (February 16, 1922 – April 4, 2013) was an American sprint canoeist who competed in the late 1940s.

At the 1948 Summer Olympics in London, he won two medals with Steven Lysak with a gold in the C-2 10000 m event and a silver in the C-2 1000 m events. A native of Yonkers, New York, Macknowski attended Columbia University and later became an insurance agent. He died on April 4, 2013, aged 91.
