= Ramón Cora =

Cuban rower

Personal information
- Born: 23 November 1929; Havana, Cuba
- Died: 21 January 2014 (aged 84)

Sport
- Sport: Rowing

Ramón Cora (23 November 1929 – 21 January 2014) was a Cuban rower. He competed in the men's coxed four event at the 1948 Summer Olympics.
