= Sigurd Grønli (rower) =

Norwegian rower

Personal information
- Nationality: Norwegian
- Born: 24 August 1927 Asker, Norway
- Died: 18 January 2001 (aged 73) Oslo, Norway

Sport
- Sport: Rowing

Sigurd Grønli (24 August 1927 – 18 January 2001) was a Norwegian rower. He competed in the men's coxed four event at the 1948 Summer Olympics.
