= Lucilo de la Peña =

Cuban fencer (1921–1977)

Personal information
- Full name: Lucilo de la Peña López de Trigo
- Born: 2 May 1921 Artemisa, Cuba
- Died: 1 August 1977 (aged 56) Los Angeles, California, U.S.

Sport
- Sport: Fencing

Lucilo de la Peña (2 May 1921 – 1 August 1977) was a Cuban fencer. He competed in the individual foil event at the 1948 Summer Olympics.
