= Mike Symons =

British canoeist

James Michael Dalrymple Symons (7 December 1918 – 28 July 1984) was a British sprint canoeist who competed in the late 1940s. At the 1948 Summer Olympics in London, he finished seventh in the C-2 1000 m event.
