= Jean Dubois (canoeist) =

Belgian canoeist

Jean Dubois (Milmort, 13 August 1914 – Sclessin, 9 June 2005) was a Belgian sprint canoeist who competed in the late 1940s. In 1939 (during universal exhibition in Liege city) he was world champion. This is why he was selected for London Olympics after the war. At the 1948 Summer Olympics in London, he competed in the C-2 1000 m event. His partner, Hubert Coomans, broke his paddle and they finished unclassified.
