= Lajos Nagy (rower) =

Hungarian rower

Personal information
- Nationality: Hungarian
- Born: 26 March 1924; Budapest, Hungary
- Died: 30 January 1996 (aged 71)

Sport
- Sport: Rowing

Lajos Nagy (26 March 1924 – 30 January 1996) was a Hungarian rower. He competed in two events at the 1948 Summer Olympics.
