= Bob Martin (rower) =

American rower (1925–2012)

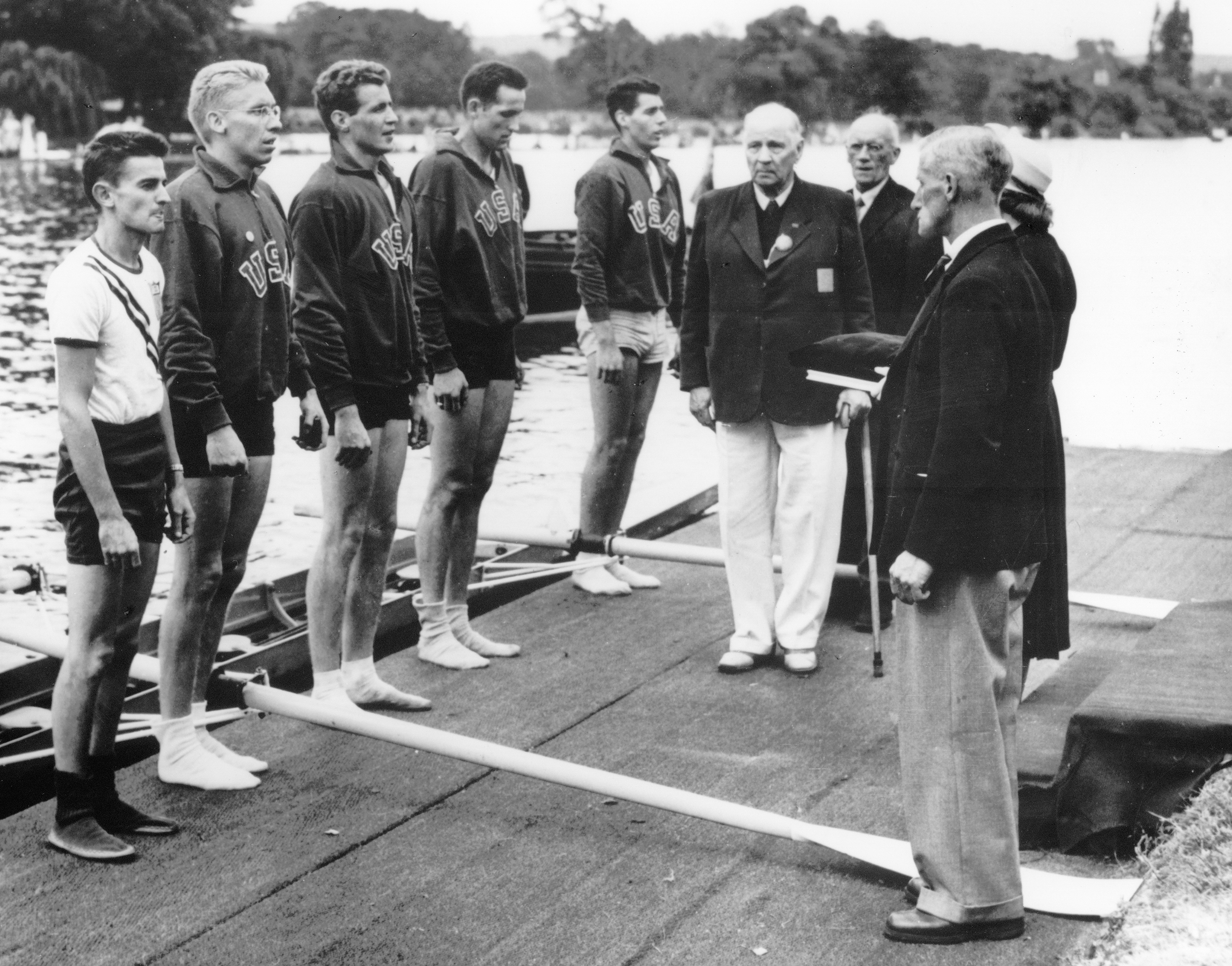
- Martin (3rd left) 1948 medal ceremony

Personal information
- Born: Robert Doud Martin; June 19, 1925 Tacoma, Washington, U.S.
- Died: October 18, 2012 (aged 87) Gig Harbor, Washington, U.S.
- Education: University of Washington

Sport
- Sport: Rowing
- Club: University of Washington
Medal record
Men's rowing
Representing the United States
Olympic Games
Gold medal – first place	1948 London	Coxed four

Robert Doud Martin (June 19, 1925 – October 18, 2012) was an American rower who competed in the 1948 Summer Olympics. He was born in Tacoma, Washington and died in Gig Harbor, Washington.

In 1948 he was a crew member of the American boat which won the gold medal in the coxed fours event.
