= Armando Barrientos =

Cuban fencer (1906–1998)

Personal information
- Full name: Armando Barrientos Schweyer
- Born: 24 March 1906 Havana, Cuba
- Died: 2 October 1998 (aged 92) Miami, Florida, United States

Sport
- Sport: Fencing
Medal record
Men's fencing
Representing Cuba
Pan American Games
Bronze medal – third place	1951 Buenos Aires	Team foil

Armando Barrientos Schweyer (24 March 1906 – 2 October 1998) is a Cuban fencer. He competed in the individual foil and team épée events at the 1948 Summer Olympics.
