= Allen Morgan (rowing) =

American rower (1925–2011)

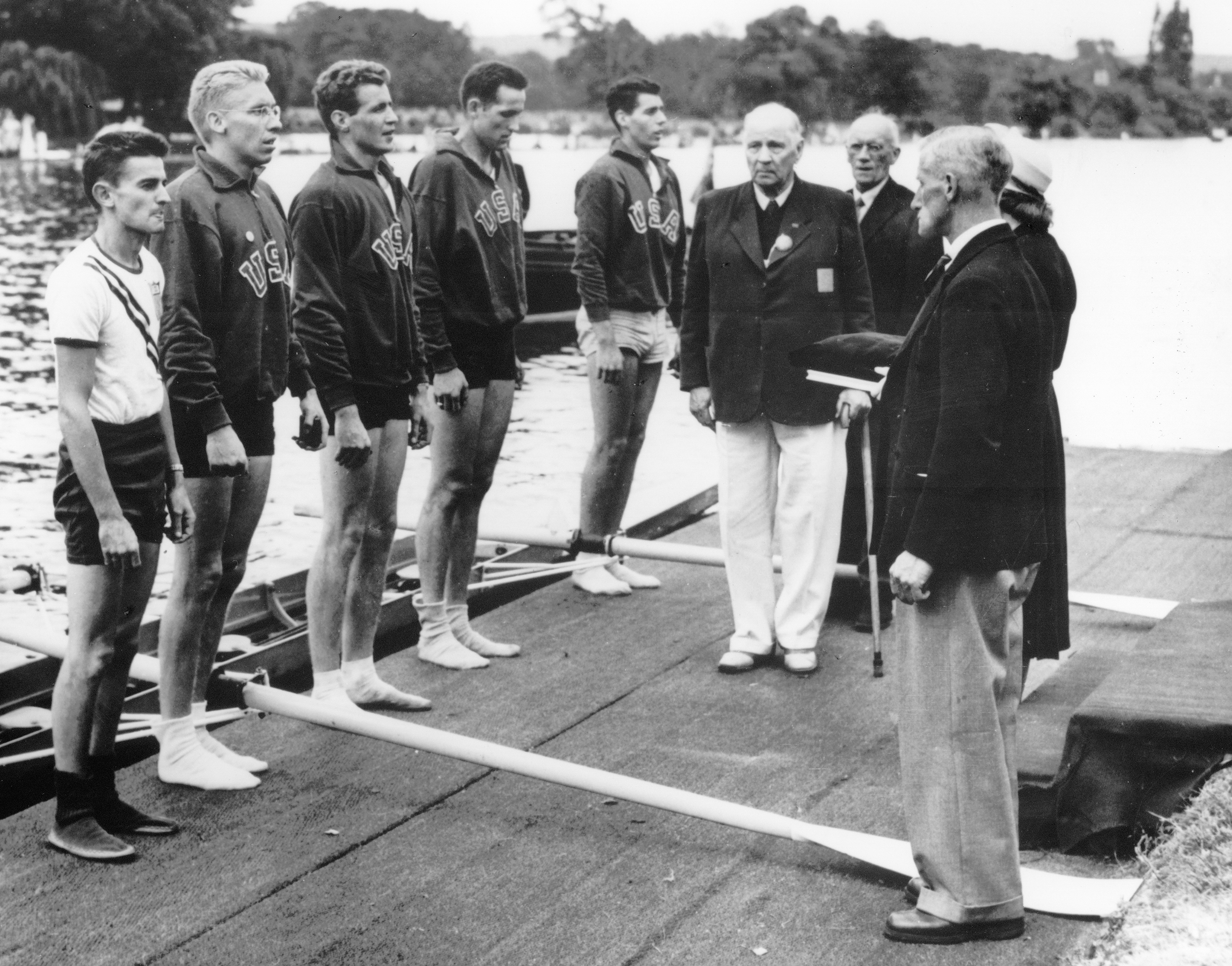
- Morgan (left) 1948 medal ceremony

Personal information
- Born: Allen Jerome Morgan; July 16, 1925
- Died: September 12, 2011 (aged 86)
- Education: University of Washington

Sport
- Sport: Rowing
- Club: University of Washington
Medal record
Men's rowing
Representing the United States
Olympic Games
Gold medal – first place	1948 London	Coxed four

Allen Jerome Morgan (July 16, 1925 – September 12, 2011) was an American rowing coxswain who competed in the 1948 Summer Olympics.

Born in Seattle, Washington, he coxed the American boat that won the gold medal in the coxed four event in 1948.
