= Steven Lysak =

American canoeist (1912–2002)

Personal information
- Born: August 7, 1912
- Died: July 30, 2002 (aged 89)

Sport
- Country: United States
- Sport: Canoe racing
Medal record
Pan Pacific Championships
Men's rowing
Representing the United States
Olympic Games
Gold medal – first place	1948 London	C-2 10000 m
Silver medal – second place	1948 London	C-2 1000 m

Stephen John Lysak (August 7, 1912 – July 30, 2002) was an American sprint canoeist who competed in the late 1940s.

At the 1948 Summer Olympics in London, he won two medals with Stephen Macknowski. This included a gold in the C-2 10000 m and a silver in the C-2 1000 m events.

Born in Newark, New Jersey, Lysak designed and built the canoe he and Macknowski used for the 1948 Games. After the Olympics, Lysak resided in Yonkers, New York where he died in 2002.
