= Warren Westlund =

American rower (1926–1992)

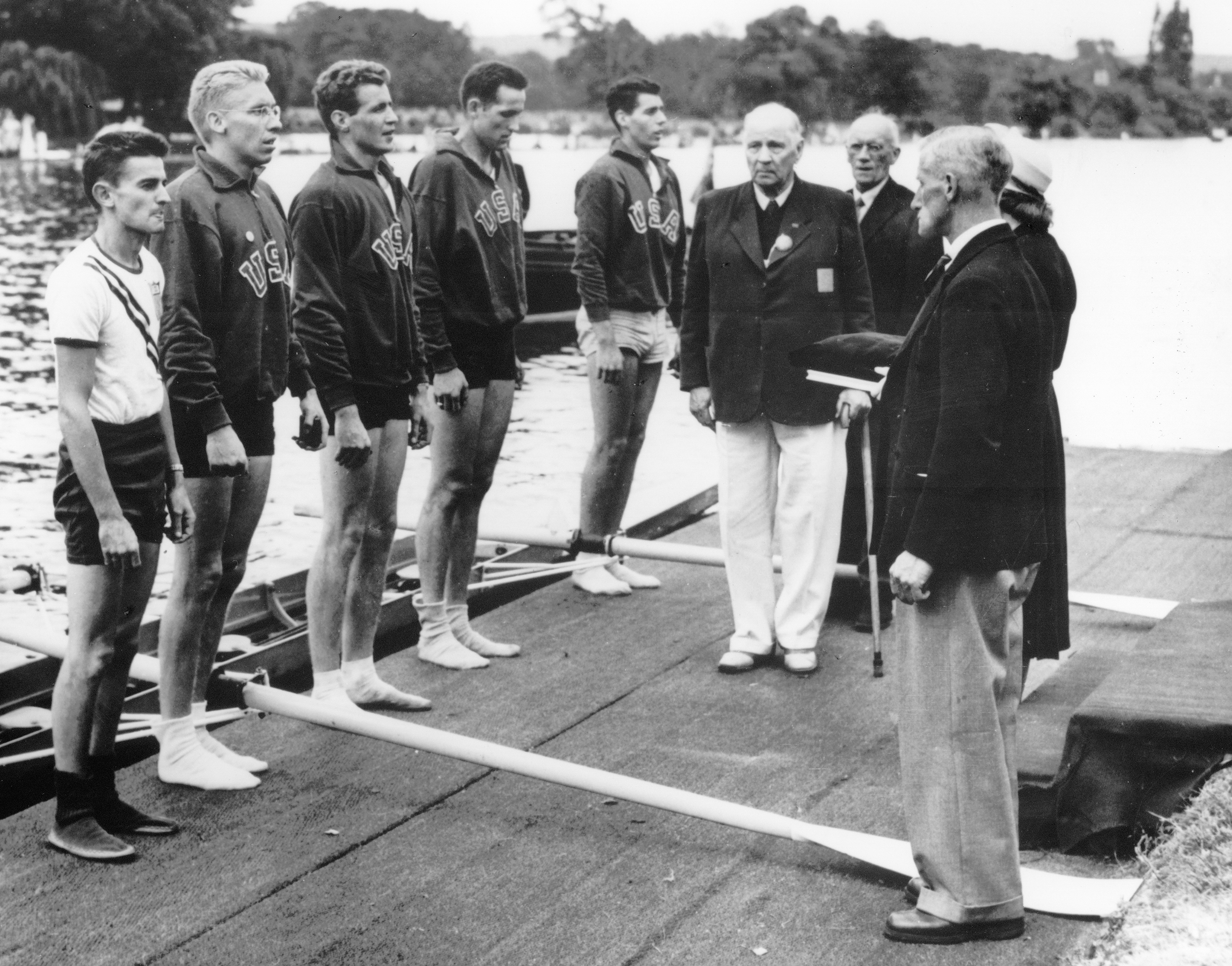
- Westlund (2nd left) 1948 medal ceremony

Personal information
- Born: Warren DeHaven Westlund; August 20, 1926
- Died: February 13, 1992 (aged 65)
- Education: University of Washington

Sport
- Sport: Rowing
- Club: University of Washington
Medal record
Men's rowing
Representing the United States
Olympic Games
Gold medal – first place	1948 London	Coxed four

Warren DeHaven Westlund (August 20, 1926 – February 13, 1992) was an American rower, an Olympic gold medallist at London 1948.

== Rowing ==
Westlund graduated from Roosevelt High School and took up rowing at the University of Washington where he rowed varsity crews. In 1948 he was the strokeman of the American boat which won the gold medal in the coxed fours event.

== Career and personal ==
He was born in Olympia, Washington and died in Seattle aged 65. He was an automobile dealer running a Buick GMC dealership in Seattle and had been a past chairman of the Seattle Automobile Show. He was married 41 years to his wife Pauline.
