= Oiva Lommi =

Finnish rower

Olympic medal record

Men's rowing
Bronze medal – third place	1952 Helsinki	Coxless four

Oiva Lommi (30 June 1922 – 23 July 2000) was a Finnish rower who competed in the 1948 Summer Olympics and in the 1952 Summer Olympics.

He was born in Vehkalahti and died in Kotka. He was the cousin of Veikko Lommi. In 1948 he was a crew member of the Finnish boat which was eliminated in the quarter-finals of the coxed four event. Four years later he won the bronze medal with the Finnish boat in the coxless four competition.
