= Robert Collins (rower) =

British rower (1924–2012)

Robert Anthony Collins (18 April 1924 – 27 January 2012) was a British rower who competed in the 1948 Summer Olympics. He died in London on 27 January 2012, at the age of 87.
