= Joaquin Godoy =

Cuban rower

Personal information
- Nationality: Cuban
- Born: 13 March 1927
- Died: 29 November 2013 (aged 86)

Sport
- Sport: Rowing

Joaquin Godoy (13 March 1927 – 29 November 2013) was a Cuban rower. He competed in the men's coxed four event at the 1948 Summer Olympics.
