= Ramón Puig =

Cuban rower

Personal information
- Born: 21 August 1929 Santiago de Cuba, Cuba
- Died: 21 August 2016 (aged 87)

Sport
- Sport: Rowing

Ramón Puig (21 August 1929 – 21 August 2016) was a Cuban rower. He competed in the men's coxed four event at the 1948 Summer Olympics.

Puig was arrested in 1960 for his role in the Bay of Pigs Invasion and sentenced to thirty years of hard labor in various Cuban prisons. His brother, Manuel Puig, was executed for his role in the attack. Ramón was eventually released and escaped to Miami where he lived for the rest of his life.
