= Veikko Lommi =

Finnish rower

Olympic medal record

Men's rowing
Bronze medal – third place	1952 Helsinki	Coxless four

Veikko Kristian Lommi (7 November 1917 – 20 June 1989) was a Finnish rower who competed in the 1948 Summer Olympics and in the 1952 Summer Olympics.

He was born in Vehkalahti and died in Kotka. He was the cousin of Oiva Lommi. In 1948 he was a crew member of the Finnish boat which was eliminated in the quarter-finals of the coxed four event. Four years later he won the bronze medal with the Finnish boat in the coxless four competition.
