= Gordy Giovanelli =

American rower (1925–2022)

Gus Giovanelli
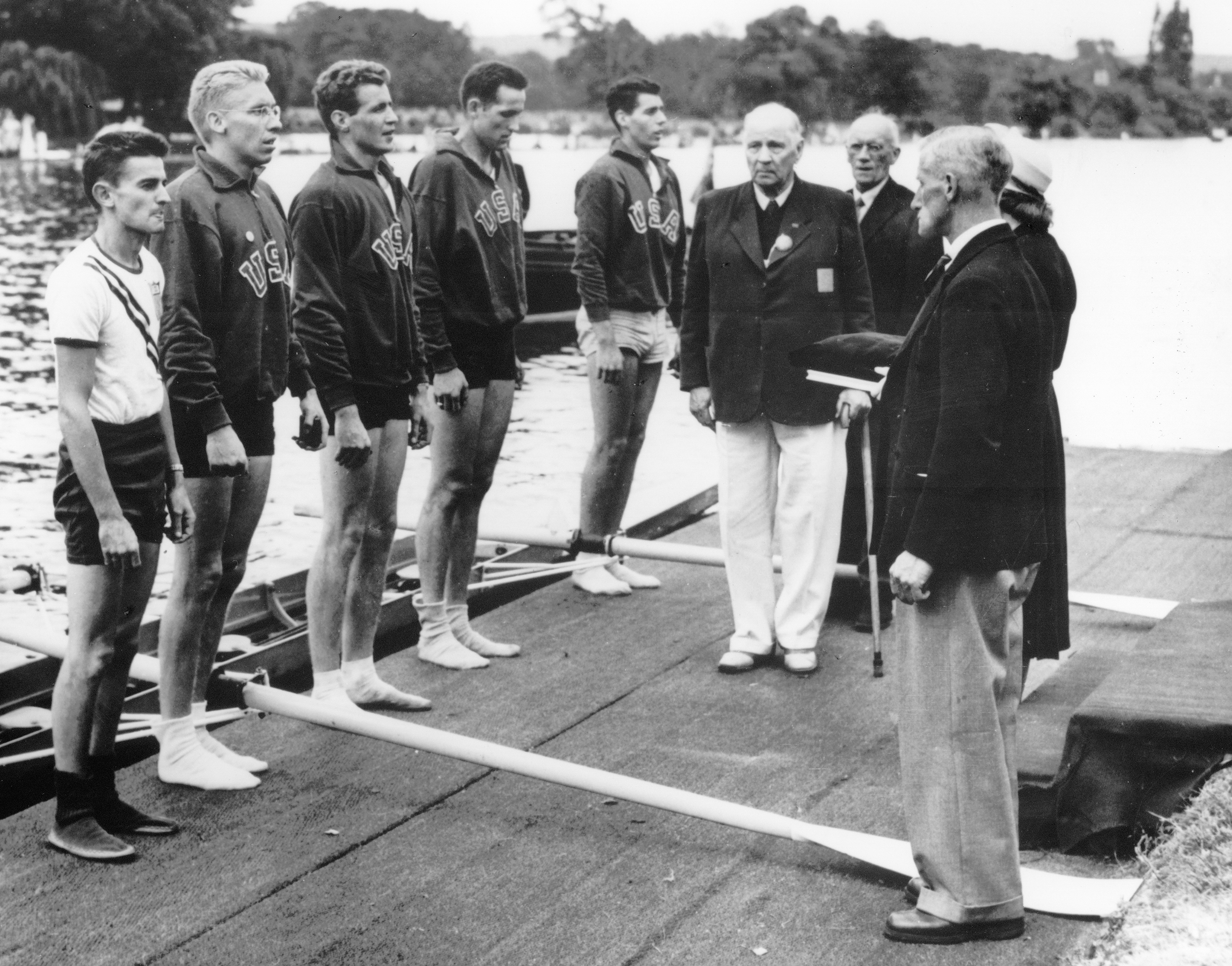
- Giovanelli (5th left) 1948 medal ceremony

Personal information
- Full name: Gordon Stephen Giovanelli
- Born: April 11, 1925 Everett, Washington, U.S.
- Died: December 21, 2022 (aged 97) Escondido, California, U.S.
Medal record
Men's rowing
Representing United States
Olympic Games
Gold medal – first place	1948 London	Coxed four

Gordon Stephen "Gus" Giovanelli (April 11, 1925 – December 21, 2022) was an American rower who competed in the 1948 Summer Olympics. He crewed for the University of Washington and in 1948 he was the bowman of the American boat which won the gold medal in the coxed fours event. He was born in Everett, Washington.

Giovanelli died in Escondido, California on December 21, 2022, at the age of 97. He was the oldest surviving United States Olympic gold medalist at the time of his death.
