= Thoralf Sandaker =

Norwegian rower (1923–2020)

Thoralf William Sandaker (4 May 1923 – August 2020) was a Norwegian rower who competed in the 1948 Summer Olympics. He represented the club Christiania RK.
