= Klaus Serck-Hanssen =

Norwegian engineer and mining executive

Klaus Serck-Hanssen (5 April 1886 – 28 August 1980) was a Norwegian engineer and mining executive.

== Personal life ==
Serck-Hanssen was born in Bergen, a son of physician and politician Klaus Hanssen and Dorothea Marstrand Serck. He married Gunvor Quenild in 1921. Among their children was Arne Serck-Hanssen (born 1925), a competitive sportsperson who participated at the 1948 Summer Olympics.

== Career ==
Serck-Hanssen graduated with a diplom degree in shipbuilding from the TH Charlottenburg in 1911. From 1912 he initiated a career in the mining industry. He was manager of the Vigsnes Copperworks on the island of Karmøy from 1914 to 1920. From 1920 to 1938 he was assistant manager at the Orkla Mining Company. From 1939 to 1954 he managed the Skorovass Gruber in Skorovatn.

During the German occupation of Norway he was arrested by the Nazi authorities in April 1942, and held in the prison at Åkebergveien, at Møllergata 19 and the Grini concentration camp until the war ended. His son Arne was also held at Grini.

He died in August 1980 and was buried at Ris.
