= Manuel Puig (rower) =

Cuban rower (1928–1961)

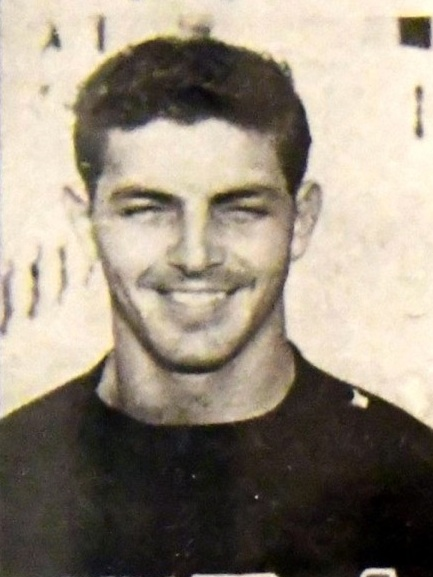

Personal information
- Born: 10 August 1928; Santiago de Cuba, Cuba
- Died: 20 April 1961 (aged 32); Havana, Cuba

Sport
- Sport: Rowing

Manuel Puig Miyar (10 August 1928 – 20 April 1961) was a Cuban rower. He competed in the men's coxed four event at the 1948 Summer Olympics.

Puig was a member of Brigade 2506 and participated in the Bay of Pigs Invasion. He was captured by the Cuban government and executed by firing squad. His brother, Ramón Puig, also participated in the attack and was sentenced to thirty years hard labor, but eventually was released and escaped to Miami.
