= Douglas Bennett (canoeist) =

Canadian canoeist (1918–2008)

Olympic medal record

Men's canoe sprint
| Silver medal – second place | 1948 London | C-1 1000 m |

Douglas Bennett (September 13, 1918 – June 28, 2008) was a Canadian sprint canoeist who competed from the mid-1930s to the late 1940s. He won a silver medal in the C-1 1000 m event at 1948 Summer Olympics in London.

Prior to becoming a canoeist, Bennett played for the Royal Montreal Hockey Club in 1937. He took up canoeing when his swimming career did not pan out. Winning several canoeing championships for Canada between 1934 and 1939, he qualified for the 1940 Summer Olympics in Tokyo that were subsequently cancelled. In 1947, Bennett was named Montreal's Sportsman of the Year after winning Canada's C-1, C-2, and C-4 national championships. Following the 1948 games, Bennett retired and went to work for Bell Canada's engineering department though he would continue canoeing for exercise.

Bennett was a native of Saint Lambert, Quebec.
