= Francesco Gotti =

Italian rower

Personal information
- Born: 18 September 1923 Castro, Bergamo, Kingdom of Italy
- Died: 4 July 1996 (aged 72) Lovere, Bergamo, Italy

Sport
- Sport: Rowing
Medal record
Men's rowing
Representing Italy
European Rowing Championships
Silver medal – second place	1947 Lucerne	Coxed four

Francesco Gotti (18 September 1923 – 4 July 1996) was an Italian rower. He competed at the 1948 Summer Olympics in London with the men's coxed four where they were eliminated in the semi-final.
