= Iraklis Klangas =

Greek rower (1926–2003)

Personal information
- Nationality: Greek
- Born: 25 November 1926
- Died: 30 September 2003 (aged 76); Thessaloniki, Greece

Sport
- Sport: Rowing

Iraklis Klangas (25 November 1926 – 30 September 2003) was a Greek rower. He competed at the 1948 Summer Olympics and the 1952 Summer Olympics.
