= Reginaldo Polloni =

Italian rower

Personal information
- Born: 14 November 1926 Lovere, Italy
- Died: 22 August 2004 (aged 77) Lovere, Italy

Sport
- Sport: Rowing
Medal record
Men's rowing
Representing Italy
European Rowing Championships
Silver medal – second place	1947 Lucerne	Coxed four

Reginaldo Polloni (14 November 1926 – 22 August 2004) was an Italian rower. He competed at the 1948 Summer Olympics in London with the men's coxed four where they were eliminated in the semi-final.
