= Tirso del Junco =

American politician (1925–2023)

Tirso Del Junco, Sr.
Personal information
- Born: April 20, 1925 Havana, Cuba
- Died: September 4, 2023 (aged 98) Orange County, California, U.S.
- Education: University of Havana

Sport
- Sport: Rowing

Tirso Del Junco (April 20, 1925 – September 4, 2023) was an American politician who served as chair of the Republican Party of California, and the head of the University of California board of regents. He was also an Olympic coxswain and a medical doctor.

== Early life and education ==
Del Junco was born on April 20, 1925, in Havana, Cuba. Del Junco was a graduate of the University of Havana Medical School, 1949. He took an internship at the Hollywood Presbyterian Medical Center, Rotating Internship from 1949 to 1950, and underwent residency at the Queen of Angels Hospital from 1951 to 1954. He was a member of the University of Pennsylvania, post-graduate surgical class from 1954 to 1955. He was also a member of the Cuban rowing team at the 1948 Summer Olympics in London.

== Medical career ==
Del Junco was a general surgeon, a diplomate of the American Board of Surgery, and a Fellow of the American College of Surgeons. He was chief of the medical staff at Queen of Angels Hospital from 1970 to 1971 and 1974. He headed the medical staff of Santa Marta Hospital from 1998 to 2000. He was the chairman of the Department of Surgery at Santa Marta from 1972 to 1973 and again from 1995 to 1998. He also served as the chairman of the board of directors of Santa Marta Hospital in Los Angeles, California. Afterwards, he worked as a medical director for the staff of Saint Vincent Hospital and a member of Good Samaritan Hospital, and later the assistant clinical professor of surgery of the California College of Medicine - Irvine.

=== In the military ===
Del Junco was a captain in United States Army and chief of surgery of Camp Hanford Army Hospital. He served as a medical officer during the Bay of Pigs Invasion. He was a former member of the board of visitors of the United States Naval Academy and a former member of the board of directors of Molina Medical Group and the Reserve Orange County Sheriffs Professional Services.

== University and California and political positions ==
Del Junco was a member of that board starting in 1967 and continuing until 1975. Del Junco was a member of the Board of Regents of the University of California from 1985 until 1997. He was chairman of the board from 1996 to 1997. He was a member of the Board of Governors of the United States Postal Service from 1988 to 2000, and served as chairman of that board from 1996 to 1998. He also served as a delegate to the United States Delegation to the 22nd UNESCO Conference in 1983. He had been a member of the Board of Visitors of the United States Naval Academy since 2002. He was a member of American Federation of Television and Radio Arts. He was a former ambassador for the Sovereign Military Order of Malta to Nicaragua and a member of the Knight of Magisterial Grace Sovereign Military Order of Malta.

=== Political party positions ===
Del Junco was chairman of the California Republican Party from 1981 to 1983 and again from 1993 to 1995. He was a delegate to the Republican National Convention in 1968, 1972, 1976, 1980, 1984, 1988, 1992, 1996, 2000, 2004, 2008, 2012, and 2016. In 1990, he served as the vice chair of the Pete Wilson for Governor campaign.

== Death ==
Tirso del Junco died in Orange County, California, on September 4, 2023, at the age of 98.

Party political offices
Preceded by Jim Dignan	Chair of the California Republican Party; 1993–1995	Succeeded by John Herrington
