= Gunnar Sandborg =

Norwegian rower (1927–2022)

Gunnar Sandborg (7 June 1927 – 5 May 2022) was a Norwegian rower who competed in the 1948 Summer Olympics. He died on 5 May 2022, at the age of 94.
