= Silvio Bergamini =

Italian rower (1923–1994)

Personal information
- Born: 20 November 1923 Monza, Italy
- Died: 18 January 1994 (aged 70)

Sport
- Sport: Rowing
Medal record
Men's rowing
Representing Italy
European Rowing Championships
Silver medal – second place	1951 Mâcon	Double sculls

Silvio Bergamini (20 November 1923 – 18 January 1994) was an Italian rower. He competed at the 1952 Summer Olympics in Helsinki with the men's double sculls where they were eliminated in the semi-final repêchage.
