= Domenico Cambieri =

Italian rower

Personal information
- Born: 19 September 1914 Lovere, Italy
- Died: 11 May 1988 (aged 73)

Sport
- Sport: Rowing
Medal record
Men's rowing
Representing Italy
European Rowing Championships
| Silver medal – second place | 1947 Lucerne | Coxed four |
| Gold medal – first place | 1951 Mâcon | Coxed four |

Domenico Cambieri (19 September 1914 – 11 May 1988) was an Italian coxswain. He competed at the 1948 Summer Olympics in London with the men's coxed four where they were eliminated in the semi-final.
