= Deaths in January 1996 =

The following is a list of notable deaths in January 1996.

Entries for each day are listed alphabetically by surname. A typical entry lists information in the following sequence:

- Name, age, country of citizenship at birth, subsequent country of citizenship (if applicable), reason for notability, cause of death (if known), and reference.

== January 1996 ==
=== 1 ===
- Arleigh Burke, 94, United States Navy admiral.
- Dori Dorika, 82, Russian-Italian actress.
- Sergio Ojeda Dóren, 89, Chilean politician and Olympic boxer (1928).
- Alifa Rifaat, 65, Egyptian author.
- Arthur Rudolph, 89, German rocket engineer.
- Jessie Vihrog, 89, South African-born German film actress.
- Virgil W. Vogel, 76, American television and film director.
- Sergei Yakovlev, 70, Soviet/Russian actor.
- John Rodney, 81, American actor.

=== 2 ===
- Michel Berto, 56, French actor.
- Erwin Kroggel, 83, German Olympic fencer (1952).
- Viatcheslav Nazarov, 43, Russian musician, traffic collision.
- Karl Rappan, 90, Austrian football player and coach.
- Julià Reig Ribó, 84, Andorran politician.
- George Sirochman, 77, American football player (Pittsburgh Steelers, Detroit Lions).
- Efua Sutherland, 71, Ghanaian writer.
- Karl Targownik, 80, Hungarian-born American psychiatrist and Holocaust survivor.

=== 3 ===
- Teddy Andrulewicz, 91, American football player.
- Aníbal Pinto Santa Cruz, 76-77, Chilean economist, heart attack.
- Terence Cuneo, 88, British artist.
- Paul Lipson, 82, American stage actor.
- Jean Marois, 71, Canadian ice hockey player (Toronto Maple Leafs, Chicago Black Hawks).
- Connie Ryan, 75, American baseball player and coach.
- Ričardas Vaitkevičius, 62, Soviet/Lithuanian rower and Olympian (1964).

=== 4 ===
- Anna Amalie Abert, 89, German musicologist.
- Tino Bianchi, 90, Italian actor, pneumonia.
- Jean Feyte, 92, French film editor.
- Bob Flanagan, 43, American writer, performance artist, poet, musician, and comic, cystic fibrosis.
- Zhou Mingzhen, 77, Chinese paleontologist.
- Steve Raines, 79, American actor (Rawhide).
- Ramón Vinay, 84, Chilean opera singer.

=== 5 ===
- Yahya Ayyash, 29, Palestinian chief bombmaker of Hamas, homicide.
- Gus Bivona, 80, American musician.
- Jack Church, 80, Canadian ice hockey player (Toronto Maple Leafs, Brooklyn Americans, Boston Bruins).
- Václav David, 85, Czechoslovak politician.
- Fritz Gazzera, 88, German Olympic fencer (1928).
- Lincoln Kirstein, 88, American writer, impresario, art connoisseur, and philanthropist.
- Paul Lavanga, 85, French Olympic modern pentathlete (1936).
- Knut Løfsnes, 77, Norwegian resistance member during World War II and politician.
- Thung Sin Nio, 93, Indonesian-Dutch women's rights activist, physician, economist and politician.
- Elmer Singleton, 77, American baseball player.

=== 6 ===
- Henry Hopkinson, 1st Baron Colyton, 94, British politician.
- Jan Willem de Pous, 75, Dutch politician and economist.
- William J. Dyess, 66, American diplomat, cancer.
- Duane Hanson, 70, American sculptor.
- Johnnie Johnston, 80, American actor and singer.
- Maude Kegg, 91, American Ojibwe traditionalist, bead artist, and author.
- John Philipps Kenyon, 68, British historian.
- Kim Kwang-seok, 31, South Korean musician, suicide.
- Rudolf Polame, 85, Czech Olympic long jumper (1936).
- Aulis Pystynen, 68, Finnish Olympic middle-distance runner (1952).
- Kurt Schmücker, 76, German politician.
- Chubby Wise, 80, American bluegrass fiddler.

=== 7 ===
- William H. Clothier, 92, American cinematographer.
- Roger D. Foley, 78, American district judge (United States District Court for the District of Nevada).
- John A. Gronouski, 76, American diplomat.
- Károly Grósz, 65, Hungarian politician, kidney cancer.
- V. Kumar, 61, India film score composer.
- Seton Lloyd, 93, British archaeologist.
- Harold Norman Moldenke, 86, American botanist and taxonomist.
- Tarō Okamoto, 84, Japanese artist, art theorist, and writer, Parkinson's disease.
- Bienvenido Santos, 84, Filipino writer.
- Heinrich Scheel, 80, German historian of modern age.
- Aaron Stell, 84, American film and television editor.
- Arthur Whitford, 87, British gymnast and Olympian (1928).

=== 8 ===
- Paul Cleary, 73, American gridiron football player (New York Yankees, Chicago Hornets).
- Carmen Conde, 88, Spanish poet, novelist, literary critic, Alzheimer's disease.
- Teobaldo Depetrini, 81, Italian football player and coach.
- John Hargreaves, 50, Australian actor, AIDS-related complications.
- Margaret Jenkins, 92, American Olympic discus thrower (1928, 1932).
- Okla Jones II, 50, American district judge (United States District Court for the Eastern District of Louisiana).
- Fernand Leblanc, 78, Canadian politician.
- Dutch McCall, 75, American baseball player (Chicago Cubs).
- Joyce McCartan, 65, Northern Irish community worker and peace activist.
- Norrie McCathie, 34, Scottish football player, carbon monoxide poisoning.
- Michiya Mihashi, 65, Japanese singer, multiple organ dysfunction syndrome.
- Harlan Mills, 76, American computer scientist and academic.
- François Mitterrand, 79, French statesman and President of France, prostate cancer.
- Pritam Singh, 71, Indian Olympic gymnast (1956).
- Howard Taubman, 88, American theatre critic.
- Paul Vialar, 97, French writer.
- Sadao Watanabe, 83, Japanese printmaker.

=== 9 ===
- Abdullah al-Qasemi, 89, Saudi Arabian writer and intellectual, cancer.
- Moe Becker, 78, American basketball player.
- Ronnie Bell, 88, British physical chemist.
- Howie Braun, 83, American basketball player and coach.
- Roger Freed, 49, American baseball player, heart problems.
- Félix González-Torres, 38, American artist, AIDS-related complications.
- Metin Göktepe, 27, Turkish photojournalist, beaten to death.
- Maria Kusion-Bibro, 59, Polish Olympic athlete (1956, 1960).
- M. Larry Lawrence, 69, American diplomat.
- Oskar Lory, 69, Swiss Olympic bobsledder (1964).
- Walter M. Miller, 72, American fiction writer, suicide.
- Fearless Nadia, 88, Australian-Indian actress and stuntwoman.
- Sultan Rahi, 57, Pakistani actor, producer and screenwriter, ballistic trauma.
- Özdemir Sabancı, 54, Turkish businessman, murdered.
- Jack Smith, 79, American journalist, author, and newspaper columnist.
- Mike Synar, 45, American politician, member of the United States House of Representatives (1979-1995), brain cancer.
- Louis William Tordella, 84, American mathematician and deputy director of the National Security Agency.
- Overton Tremper, 89, American baseball player (Brooklyn Robins).
- Józef Wiśniewski, 55, Polish ice hockey player and Olympian (1964).
- Danni Xtravaganza, 34, American member of the ballroom scene, AIDS-related complications.

=== 10 ===
- Anders Hartington Andersen, 88, Danish Olympic long-distance runner (1932, 1936).
- Douglas Cameron, 92, New Zealand cricketer.
- Ivan Deryugin, 67, Soviet/Russian modern pentathlete and Olympic champion (1956).
- Raymond H. Fogler, 103, American politician.
- Dean McAdams, 78, American gridiron football player (Brooklyn Dodgers).
- Egidio Ortona, 85, Italian diplomat.
- Don Richardson, 77, American television director (Lost in Space, The Adventures of Ellery Queen, Bonanza).
- Joseph Charles Schultz Jr., 77, American baseball player, manager, and coach.

=== 11 ===
- Harold Walter Bailey, 96, British scholar of Asian languages.
- Tato Bores, 70, Argentine actor.
- Roger Crozier, 53, Canadian ice hockey player (Detroit Red Wings, Buffalo Sabres, Washington Capitals), cancer.
- Eric Hebborn, 61, English painter, draughtsman, art forger and author, homicide.
- Ike Isaacs, 76, Burmese-English jazz guitarist.

=== 12 ===
- Garnett Blair, 74, American baseball player.
- Arthur Gallagher, 77, American Olympic rower (1948).
- Eduard Haken, 85, Czech actor, doctor and opera singer.
- Edmund Happold, 65, British engineer and activist.
- Jonas Jonsson, 92, Swedish Olympic sport shooter (1948).
- Joseph Kuzmin, 85, Russian politician.
- John Howard Purnell, 70, Welsh chemist.
- Rizzieri Rodeghiero, 76, Italian skier and Olympian (1948).
- Fouad Sedki, 70, Egyptian Olympic football player (1948, 1952).
- Bartel Leendert van der Waerden, 92, Dutch mathematician and mathematics historian.
- Dai Ward, 61, Welsh football player.

=== 13 ===
- Denise Grey, 99, Italian-French actress.
- Mark Herron, 67, American actor, cancer.
- Dean Kelley, 64, American basketball player and Olympian (1952).
- Ester Krumbachová, 72, Czech filmmaker.
- Bobby Langton, 77, English football player and manager.
- Aliou Mahamidou, 48, Nigerien politician and Prime Minister.
- Sam Merwin, Jr., 85, American writer.
- Elina Pohjanpää, 62, Finnish actress, oral cancer.
- Jorge Sapelli, 70, Uruguayan politician.
- Peter Shenton, 59, English cricketer.
- Joe Zombek, 63, American football player (Pittsburgh Steelers).

=== 14 ===
- Annie Broadbent, 87, British Olympic artistic gymnast (1928).
- Umberto Drei, 70, Italian racing cyclist.
- Ernst Friborg Jensen, 89, Danish Olympic rower (1928).
- Jacques Lebrun, 85, French Olympic sailor (1932, 1936, 1948, 1952, 1960).
- José Pastor, 89, Spanish Olympic boxer (1924).
- Ōhikari Sadayuki, 68, Japanese sumo wrestler and coach.
- Onno Tunç, 47, Turkish composer, plane crash.

=== 15 ===
- Don Bauer, 73, Australian rules footballer.
- Les Baxter, 73, American musician, singer, and composer.
- Richard Cobb, 78, British historian, essayist, and professor.
- Dave Harper, 78, American baseball player.
- Gerhard Huttula, 93, German cinematographer and film director.
- Lindsey Jerman, 80, English cricketer.
- Nils Jørgensen, 84, Norwegian Olympic fencer (1936).
- Moshoeshoe II of Lesotho, 57, King of Lesotho, traffic collision.
- Edward Makula, 65, Polish aviator.
- Mohsin Naqvi, 48, Pakistani poet, murdered.
- Max Varnel, 70, French film director.
- Rudolf Wanderone, 82, American pool player.

=== 16 ===
- Marcia Davenport, 92, American author and music critic.
- Richard Kermode, 49, American keyboardist.
- Harry Potts, 75, English football player and manager.
- Franz Reiner, 83, Swiss Olympic canoeist (1948).
- Kurt Svanström, 80, Swedish football player.
- Mario Tosato, 65, Italian cyclist.

=== 17 ===
- Arnold Anderson, 83, New Zealand sprinter.
- Børge Enemark, 52, Danish footballer.
- Barbara Jordan, 59, American politician, member of the United States House of Representatives (1973-1979), pneumonia.
- Charles Madge, 83, English poet, journalist and sociologist.
- Mikhail Plaksin, 66, Soviet Russian Olympic rower (1952).
- Harry Robertson, 63, Scottish musician, bandleader, and composer.
- Juan Luis Segundo, 70, Uruguayan priest and theologian.
- Xuefan Zhu, 90, Chinese politician.

=== 18 ===
- Adriana Camelli, 67, Argentine Olympic swimmer (1948).
- Osro Cobb, 91, American lawyer and politician.
- Leonor Fini, 87, Argentine painter, designer and writer.
- John Hope, 1st Baron Glendevon, 83, British politician.
- N. T. Rama Rao, 72, Indian actor, producer, director, and politician, heart attack.
- Alberto Ruschel, 77, Brazilian actor, producer, and director.

=== 19 ===
- Upendranath Ashk, 85, Indian novelist, short story writer and playwright.
- Bernard Baily, 79, American comic book artist.
- A. G. Gaston, 103, American businessman.
- John Groves, 81, Jamaican cricketer.
- Kasım Gülek, 91, Turkish politician.
- Byron Keith, 78, American actor (77 Sunset Strip, Batman, The Stranger), heart attack.
- Ian Mort, 58, Australian rules footballer.
- Anton Myrer, 73, American author, leukemia.
- Donny Schmit, 29, American motorcycle racer, aplastic anemia.
- Don Simpson, 52, American film producer (Top Gun, Beverly Hills Cop, The Rock), heart failure.
- Lucien Theys, 68, Belgian long-distance and steeplechase runner and Olympian (1948, 1952).
- Harold Wolpe, 70, South African political economist.

=== 20 ===
- Buster Benton, 63, American blues guitarist and singer, diabetes.
- Tom Dimitroff, Sr., 60, American and Canadian football player (Boston Patriots), and coach.
- Thorvald Hagedorn-Olsen, 93, Danish painter.
- Sidney Korshak, 88, American lawyer and "fixer" for the Chicago Mafia.
- Joseph Mermans, 73, Belgian football player.
- Gerry Mulligan, 68, American jazz baritone saxophonist, arranger and composer, liver cancer.
- Lo Wei, 77, Chinese film director, heart failure.

=== 21 ===
- Jordan Christopher, 55, American actor (Secrets of Midland Heights) and singer.
- Roman Cieślewicz, 66, Polish artist, laryngeal cancer.
- Luther Boyd Eubanks, 78, American district judge (United States District Court for the Western District of Oklahoma).
- Les Hazelwood, 75, Australian rules footballer.
- Herbert McEver, 89, American sportsman and coach.
- Dan Monzon, 49, American baseball player (Minnesota Twins).
- Liliana Scaricabarozzi, 61, Italian Olympic gymnast (1952).
- Peter Stadlen, 85, British pianist.
- Henry Serrano Villard, 95, American diplomat and author, pneumonia.
- Joe Wiehl, 85, American football player (Pittsburgh Pirates).

=== 22 ===
- William Cantrell, 87, American powerboat and racecar driver.
- Israel Eldad, 85, Israeli philosopher.
- Dick Rand, 64, American baseball player (St. Louis Cardinals, Pittsburgh Pirates).
- Petro Shelest, 87, Soviet/Ukrainian politician.

=== 23 ===
- Carter Burden, 54, American politician, member of the New York City Council (1970-1977).
- Cliff Griffith, 79, American racecar driver.
- Norman MacCaig, 85, Scottish poet and teacher.
- Jim O'Brien, 59, Australian rules footballer.
- Stanisław Olczyk, 63, Polish ice hockey player and Olympian (1956, 1964).
- Richard Sakakida, 75, American intelligence agent.
- Horst Wende, 76, German musician.
- Art White, 80, American gridiron football player.

=== 24 ===
- Yelizaveta Bagryantseva, 66, Russian Olympic discus thrower (1952).
- Jimmy Davidson, 70, Scottish football player.
- André Deforge, 81, French cyclist.
- Sándor Iharos, 65, Hungarian long-distance runner and Olympian (1952, 1960).
- Tom Tracy, 61, American gridiron football player (Detroit Lions, Pittsburgh Steelers, Washington Redskins).
- Wim Umboh, 62, Indonesian film director.
- Seigo Yamaguchi, 71, Japanese aikido instructor and Aikikai teacher.

=== 25 ===
- Billy Bailey, 49, American murderer, execution by hanging.
- Ruth Berghaus, 68, German stage director of opera, cancer.
- Antonio Buenaventura, 91, Filipino composer and musician.
- Mike Clark, 73, American baseball player (St. Louis Cardinals).
- Chuck Coles, 64, American baseball player (Cincinnati Redlegs).
- Ángel García, 76, Cuban sprinter and Olympian (1948, 1952).
- Jack Haden, 81, American gridiron football player (New York Giants).
- Mian Shaukat Hussain, 67, Pakistani tabla player.
- Jonathan Larson, 35, American composer and playwright (Rent, Tick, Tick... Boom!), aortic dissection.
- Yuri Levitansky, 74, Russian poet and writer.
- Toshiaki Okamura, 83, Taiwanese baseball player.
- Bill Sorensen, 63, New Zealand rugby league footballer.

=== 26 ===
- Gerrit Cornelis Berkouwer, 92, Dutch theologian.
- Harold Brodkey, 65, American short-story writer and novelist, AIDS-related complications.
- Saul Goodman, 88, American timpanist.
- Yawara Hata, 85, Japanese politician and lawyer.
- Frank Howard, 86, American gridiron football player and coach.
- Charles Jewtraw, 95, American Olympic speed skater (1924).
- Jiří Kotalík, 75, Czech art historian and gallery director.
- Henry Lewis, 63, American conductor, heart attack.
- Georg Alexander, Duke of Mecklenburg, 74, German noble.
- Bob Pastor, 82, American boxer.
- Allan Robert Phillips, 81, American ornithologist, cancer.
- Stevie Plunder, 32, Australian guitarist and singer-songwriter, suicide.
- Dave Schultz, 36, American wrestler, Olympian (1984), and murder victim, shot.
- Hormasji Maneckji Seervai, 89, Indian lawyer.
- John Albert Taylor, 36, American murderer, execution by firing squad.
- Dimitri Zaitz, 78, American shot putter and Olympian (1936).

=== 27 ===
- Olga Havlová, 62, Czech activist and first wife of president Václav Havel, cancer.
- Fred Heifner, 86, Australian rules footballer.
- John Killilea, 67, American basketball coach and scout.
- Vyacheslav Lemeshev, 43, Soviet Russian Olympic boxer (1972).
- Patrick Ludlow, 92, British actor.
- Thomas Mitchell, 93, English cricket player.
- Vsevolod Sanayev, 83, Russian/Soviet actor.
- Barbara Skelton, 79, English memoirist, novelist and socialite.
- Ralph Yarborough, 92, American politician and lawyer.

=== 28 ===
- Dev Kant Baruah, 81, Indian politician.
- Joseph Brodsky, 55, Russian-American poet, heart attack.
- Burne Hogarth, 84, American cartoonist.
- Pedro Miró, 77, Cuban baseball player.
- Piero Palermini, 70, Italian actor.
- Jerry Siegel, 81, American comic book artist, co-creator of Superman, heart attack.
- Geo Widengren, 88, Swedish historian and academic.
- San Yu, 77, Burmese general, politician, and president of Myanmar.

=== 29 ===
- Jennie Caputo, 78, American Olympic gymnast (1936).
- Charles Mersch, 88, Luxembourgian Olympic water polo player (1928).
- Julius Posener, 91, German architectural historian and author.
- Terence Reese, 82, British bridge player and writer.
- Bill Sorensen, 63, New Zealand rugby player, coach and administrator.
- Jamie Uys, 74, South African film director, film producer, and screenwriter, heart attack.

=== 30 ===
- Jean Peitevin de Saint André, 83, French Olympic equestrian (1952).
- Friedrich Benfer, 90, German actor.
- Guy Doleman, 72, New Zealand actor (Thunderball, The Ipcress File, Funeral in Berlin), lung cancer.
- Neil Ferris, 68, American football player (Washington Redskins, Philadelphia Eagles, Los Angeles Rams).
- Gino Gallagher, 33, Irish republican and member of the Irish National Liberation Army, shot.
- Ed Kretz, 84, American motorcycle racer.
- Lajos Nagy, 71, Hungarian Olympic rower (1948).
- Bob Thiele, 73, American record producer and music executive, kidney failure.

=== 31 ===
- E. C. L. During Caspers, 61, Dutch archaeologist.
- John Drysdale, 69, Canadian politician, member of the House of Commons of Canada (1958-1962).
- Olle Hallberg, 92, Swedish long jumper and Olympian (1928).
- Rufus G. Herring, 74, United States Navy Medal of Honor recipient.
- Wolf Karni, 84, Finnish football referee.
- Henrik Lavonius, 81, Finnish Olympic equestrian (1952).
- Gustave Solomon, 65, American mathematician and electrical engineer.
- Jesse Williams, 72, American baseball player.
