= Athletics at the 1948 Summer Olympics – Men's 1500 metres =

Men's 1500 metres at the Games of the XIV Olympiad
- Olympic Athletics
- Venue: Wembley Stadium
- Dates: August 4, 1948 (heats); August 6, 1948 (final)
- Competitors: 36 from 22 nations
- Winning time: 3:49.8

Medalists
1st place, gold medalist(s)		Henry Eriksson; Sweden
2nd place, silver medalist(s)		Lennart Strand; Sweden
3rd place, bronze medalist(s)		Willem Slijkhuis; Netherlands

The men's 1500 metres event at the 1948 Olympic Games took place August 4 and August 6. Thirty-six athletes from 22 nations competed. The maximum number of athletes per nation had been set at 3 since the 1930 Olympic Congress. The final was won by Swede Henry Eriksson. It was Sweden's first medal in the 1500 metres; Lennart Strand took Sweden's second medal 0.6 seconds later. Willem Slijkhuis earned bronze, with the Netherlands also receiving its first medal in the 1500 metres.

== Background ==
This was the 11th appearance of the event, which is one of 12 athletics events to have been held at every Summer Olympics. None of the finalists from the pre-war 1936 Games returned. The 1500 metres landscape had shifted strongly towards Sweden during World War II; the nation had never won an Olympic medal in the sport before the war but was aiming for a sweep in 1948 despite Arne Andersson and Gunder Hägg being declared ineligible professionals. The team in London was Lennart Strand (1946 European champion, world list leader in 1947), Henry Eriksson (1946 European runner-up, second on world list in 1947), and Gösta Bergkvist (third on the world list in 1947).

Iceland, Ireland, South Korea, and Trinidad and Tobago each made their first appearance in the event. The United States made its 11th appearance, the only nation to have competed in the men's 1500 metres at each Games to that point.

== Competition format ==
The competition consisted of two rounds, the format used since 1908. The number of semifinals remained at four, with between 7 and 9 runners in each. The top three runners in each heat advanced to the final, resulting in the typical 12-man final race.

== Records ==
These were the standing world and Olympic records prior to the 1948 Summer Olympics.

World record	Gunder Hägg (SWE)	3:43.0	Gothenburg, Sweden	7 July 1944
Olympic record	Jack Lovelock (NZL)	3:47.8	Berlin, Germany	6 August 1936

No world or Olympic records were set during the competition.

== Schedule ==
All times are British Summer Time (UTC+1).

Date	Time	Round
Wednesday, 4 August 1948	16:30	Semifinals
Friday, 6 August 1948	17:00	Final

== Results ==
=== Semifinals ===
==== Semifinal 1 ====
Rank	Athlete	Nation	Time	Notes
1	Lennart Strand	Sweden	3:54.2	Q
2	Erik Jørgensen	Denmark	3:54.2	Q
3	Don Gehrmann	United States	3:54.8	Q
4	Frits de Ruijter	Netherlands	3:55.2	
5	Olavi Luoto	Finland	3:58.0	
6	Henri Klein	France	3:59.8	
7	Cahit Önel	Turkey	4:00.0	
8	John Joe Barry	Ireland	4:00.5	
9	Cliff Salmond	Canada	4:16.2	
10	Antero Mongrut	Peru	Unknown	
—	Hans Streuli	Switzerland	DNS	

==== Semifinal 2 ====
Rank	Athlete	Nation	Time	Notes
1	Willem Slijkhuis	Netherlands	3:52.4	Q
2	Václav Čevona	Czechoslovakia	3:53.0	Q
3	Denis Johansson	Finland	3:54.0	Q
4	Jack Hutchins	Canada	3:54.4	
5	Doug Wilson	Great Britain	3:54.8	
6	Clem Eischen	United States	4:00.2	
7	Vasilios Mavroidis	Greece	Unknown	
8	Juan Adarraga	Spain	4:03.7	
9	Wilfred Tull	Trinidad and Tobago	Unknown	
—	Bruno Schneider	Austria	DNS	
—	Adán Torres	Argentina	DNS	

==== Semifinal 3 ====
Rank	Athlete	Nation	Time	Notes
1	Henry Eriksson	Sweden	3:53.8	Q
2	Bill Nankeville	Great Britain	3:55.8	Q
3	Josy Barthel	Luxembourg	3:56.4	Q
4	Jean Vernier	France	3:57.6	
5	Melchor Palmeiro	Argentina	4:01.6	
6	Óskar Jónsson	Iceland	4:03.2	
7	Riza Maksut İşman	Turkey	Unknown	
—	Bill Parnell	Canada	DNF	
—	Daniel Poyan	Spain	DNS	
—	Gaston Reiff	Belgium	DNS	

==== Semifinal 4 ====
Rank	Athlete	Nation	Time	Notes
1	Gösta Bergkvist	Sweden	3:51.8	Q
2	Marcel Hansenne	France	3:52.8	Q
3	Sándor Garay	Hungary	3:53.0	Q
4	Roland Sink	United States	3:53.2	
5	Kaare Vefling	Norway	3:54.6	
6	Richard Morris	Great Britain	3:55.8	
7	Ingvard Nielsen	Denmark	4:01.7	
8	Karl-Heinz Hubler	Switzerland	4:03.0	
9	Lee Yun-seok	South Korea	Unknown	
—	Raymond Rosier	Belgium	DNS	

=== Final ===
The results of the final past the first six places are disputed. The Official Report lists the times and places of the top six runners, but all others are marked simply as "also competed." The table below presents the results as shown by Olympedia, "based on information from Richard Hymans, British athletics statistical expert" and "supplemented . . . by various descriptions from multiple national sources, including a Swedish radio report of the finish of the race, which definitively gives Garay as placing seventh." Below the main table, alternative placements are shown.

Rank	Athlete	Nation	Time (hand)	Time (auto)
1st place, gold medalist(s)	Henry Eriksson	Sweden	3:49.8	3:50.0
2nd place, silver medalist(s)	Lennart Strand	Sweden	3:50.4	3:50.40
3rd place, bronze medalist(s)	Willem Slijkhuis	Netherlands	3:50.4	3:50.48
4	Václav Čevona	Czechoslovakia	3:51.2	3:51.37
5	Gösta Bergkvist	Sweden	3:52.2	3:52.05
6	Bill Nankeville	Great Britain	3:52.6	3:52.51
7	Sándor Garay	Hungary	3:54.4	3:54.63
8	Don Gehrmann	United States	3:54.5	3:54.65
9	Erik Jørgensen	Denmark	3:56.1	3:56.28
10	Josy Barthel	Luxembourg	3:56.9	3:57.14
11	Marcel Hansenne	France	4:02.0	
12	Denis Johansson	Finland	Unknown	

Alternative placements

Rank	Olympedia	Kluge	Megede	T&FN
7	Sándor Garay	Sándor Garay	Don Gehrmann	Erik Jørgensen
8	Don Gehrmann	Erik Jørgensen	Erik Jørgensen	Don Gehrmann
9	Erik Jørgensen	Josy Barthel	Denis Johansson	Denis Johansson
10	Josy Barthel	Don Gehrmann	Josy Barthel	Josy Barthel
11	Marcel Hansenne	Marcel Hansenne	Marcel Hansenne	Marcel Hansenne
12	Denis Johansson	Denis Johansson	Sándor Garay	Sándor Garay

== Notes ==
- "The Official Report of the Organising Committee for the XIV Olympiad" (PDF). LA84 Foundation. 1948. Archived from the original (PDF) on September 27, 2013.
