= Athletics at the 1952 Summer Olympics – Men's 1500 metres =

Men's 1500 metres at the Games of the XV Olympiad
- Olympic Athletics
- Venue: Helsinki Olympic Stadium
- Dates: July 24, 1952 (heats); July 25, 1952 (semifinals); July 26, 1952 (final)
- Competitors: 52 from 26 nations
- Winning time: 3:45.2 OR

Medalists
1st place, gold medalist(s)		Josy Barthel; Luxembourg
2nd place, silver medalist(s)		Bob McMillen; United States
3rd place, bronze medalist(s)		Werner Lueg; Germany

Video on YouTube amateur film

The men's 1500 metres event at the 1952 Olympics took place between July 24 and July 26. Fifty-two athletes from 26 nations competed. The maximum number of athletes per nation had been set at 3 since the 1930 Olympic Congress. The event was won by Josy Barthel of Luxembourg; to date, this is the only Olympic gold medal won by a Luxembourger, though Luxembourg-born Michel Théato is credited for winning the 1900 Marathon for France. Germany won its first medal in the 1500 metres with Werner Lueg's bronze.

== Summary ==
The early leaders of the final were Audun Boysen followed by Warren Druetzler. Towards the end of the first lap, Werner Lueg began to move up to take the lead, with Rolf Lamers on his shoulder to place a wall to control the pack. Patrick El Mabrouk was next in line but unable to get by. On the third lap Lamers was unable to maintain the pace as Josy Barthel and Roger Bannister exchanging elbows with El Mabrouk lined up behind Leug. With 300 metres to go, Leug accelerated, opening up a 5-metre gap down the backstretch but through the final turn, Leug was unable to hold the pace allowing Barthel to catch back up. Bob McMillen moved up from eighth place to catch the group of leaders at the head of the final straight. Barthel went around Leug and sprinted to victory. McMillen ran the long way around El Mabrouk and Bannister and was chasing Barthel down the straight. Leug maintained his gap on Bannister and El Mabrouk, but looked helplessly as McMillen sprinted past, but he did not have enough race left to catch Barthel, finishing half a metre behind but also being credited with the same time, a new Olympic record.

It has been retrospectively asserted that Barthel's win was so unexpected that the band playing the winner's national anthem had not prepared the sheet music for Luxembourg's Ons Heemecht, and instead improvised a tune. However, contemporary accounts in the Luxembourgish press suggest the correct anthem was played; the wrong anthem incident actually took place in a dream Barthel had the night before, which he recalled in an radio interview given immediately after his win.

== Background ==
This was the 12th appearance of the event, which is one of 12 athletics events to have been held at every Summer Olympics. Six of the finalists from the 1948 Games returned: bronze medalist Willem Slijkhuis of the Netherlands, fourth-place finisher Václav Čevona of Czechoslovakia, fifth-place finisher Bill Nankeville of Great Britain, and later places (the 1948 final's places after sixth are disputed) Sándor Garay of Hungary, Josy Barthel of Luxembourg, and Denis Johansson of Finland. Werner Lueg of Germany had tied the world record a month before the Games. "There was no favorite for the 1952 1,500 [metres], but the field had outstanding depth."

The Soviet Union, Thailand, and Venezuela each made their first appearance in the event. The United States made its 12th appearance, the only nation to have competed in the men's 1500 metres at each Games to that point.

== Competition format ==
For the first time, the competition expanded to three rounds. There were six heats of between 7 and 10 runners each, with the top four runners in each advancing to the semifinals. This allowed the number of semifinals to be reduced to two and the number of runners in each to be standardized at 12. The top six runners in each semifinal advanced to the final, resulting in the typical 12-man final race.

== Records ==
These were the standing world and Olympic records prior to the 1952 Summer Olympics.

World record	Gunder Hägg (SWE)	3:43.0	Gothenburg, Sweden	7 July 1944
Olympic record	Jack Lovelock (NZL)	3:47.8	Berlin, Germany	6 August 1936

During the final, Josy Barthel set a new Olympic record at 3:45.2. The top eight men in the final all surpassed the old (pre-World War II) Olympic record.

== Schedule ==
All times are Eastern European Summer Time (UTC+3)

Date	Time	Round
Thursday, 24 July 1952	17:10	Round 1
Friday, 25 July 1952	17:40	Semifinals
Saturday, 26 July 1952	16:30	Final

== Results ==
=== Round 1 ===
The first round was held on July 24. The fastest four runners in each heat advanced to the semifinal round.

==== Heat 1 ====
Rank	Athlete	Nation	Time (hand)	Time (automatic)	Notes
1	Josy Barthel	Luxembourg	3:51.6	3:51.75	Q
2	Günter Dohrow	Germany	3:51.8	3:51.90	Q
3	Ingvar Ericsson	Sweden	3:52.0	3:52.14	Q
4	Don MacMillan	Australia	3:52.0	3:52.30	Q
5	Sándor Iharos	Hungary	3:56.0	3:56.85	
6	Mieczysław Długoborski	Poland	3:57.8	3:57.70	
7	Filemón Camacho	Venezuela	4:18.0	–	
8	Pierre Gillet	France	4:26.6	–	
—	Hans Harting	Netherlands	DNF	–	
—	Hugo Nutini	Chile	DNS	–	
—	Jack Hutchins	Canada	DNS	–	

==== Heat 2 ====
Rank	Athlete	Nation	Time (hand)	Time (automatic)	Notes
1	Warren Druetzler	United States	3:51.4	3:51.66	Q
2	Sture Landqvist	Sweden	3:52.2	3:52.31	Q
3	Stanislav Jungwirth	Czechoslovakia	3:52.4	3:52.58	Q
4	Mihail Velsvebel	Soviet Union	3:52.6	3:52.72	Q
5	Aulis Pystynen	Finland	3:53.0	3:53.33	
6	Len Eyre	Great Britain	3:53.2	3:53.34	
7	Fred Lüthi	Switzerland	3:56.4	3:56.52	
8	Turhan Göker	Turkey	4:00.6	4:01.02	
—	Gaston Reiff	Belgium	DNS	–	
—	Víctor Solares	Guatemala	DNS	–	

==== Heat 3 ====
Rank	Athlete	Nation	Time (hand)	Time (automatic)	Notes
1	Olle Åberg	Sweden	3:51.0	3:51.14	Q
2	Denis Johansson	Finland	3:51.2	3:51.22	Q
3	Rolf Lamers	Germany	3:52.4	3:52.72	Q
4	Bill Parnell	Canada	3:53.4	3:53.75	Q
5	Fritz Prossinagg	Austria	3:54.2	3:54.76	
6	Athol Jennings	South Africa	3:55.4	3:55.69	
7	Daniel Janssens	Belgium	3:55.8	3:55.98	
8	Cahit Önel	Turkey	3:58.4	3:58.42	
—	Willem Slijkhuis	Netherlands	DNF	–	
—	Les Perry	Australia	DNS	–	

==== Heat 4 ====
Rank	Athlete	Nation	Time (hand)	Time (automatic)	Notes
1	Patrick El Mabrouk	France	3:55.8	3:55.77	Q
2	Bob McMillen	United States	3:55.8	3:55.82	Q
3	Roger Bannister	Great Britain	3:56.0	3:56.13	Q
4	Vilmos Tölgyesi	Hungary	3:56.0	3:56.20	Q
5	John Landy	Australia	3:57.0	3:57.14	
6	Andrija Otenhajmer	Yugoslavia	3:57.8	3:58.20	
7	Maurice Marshall	New Zealand	4:01.0	4:01.03	
8	Nikolay Kuchurin	Soviet Union	4:03.6	4:01.80	
9	Vasilios Mavroidis	Greece	4:07.8	–	
—	Augusto Robles	Guatemala	DNS	–	

==== Heat 5 ====
Rank	Athlete	Nation	Time (hand)	Time (automatic)	Notes
1	George Hoskins	New Zealand	3:56.2	3:56.33	Q
2	Frans Herman	Belgium	3:56.2	3:56.37	Q
3	Bill Nankeville	Great Britain	3:56.4	3:56.48	Q
4	Mykola Belokurov	Soviet Union	3:56.4	3:56.47	Q
5	Urpo Vähäranta	Finland	3:56.8	3:56.85	
6	Javier Montez	United States	3:58.2	3:58.10	
7	Stefan Lewandowski	Poland	4:00.8	4:00.87	
—	Frank Prince	Panama	DNS	–	
—	Guillermo Solá	Chile	DNS	–	
—	Gunnar Nielsen	Denmark	DNS	–	

==== Heat 6 ====
Rank	Athlete	Nation	Time (hand)	Time (automatic)	Notes
1	Werner Lueg	Germany	3:52.0	3:52.31	Q
2	Václav Cevona	Czechoslovakia	3:53.4	3:53.45	Q
3	Audun Boysen	Norway	3:55.0	3:55.15	Q
4	John Ross	Canada	3:55.2	3:55.60	Q
5	Jean Vernier	France	3:56.8	3:56.61	
6	Edmund Potrzebowski	Poland	3:56.8	3:56.91	
7	Sándor Garay	Hungary	4:01.2	4:01.53	
8	Ekrem Koçak	Turkey	4:01.4	4:01.77	
9	William Fahmy Hanna	Egypt	4:11.2	–	
10	Satid Leangtanom	Thailand	4:32.6	–	
—	Yoshitaka Muroya	Japan	DNS	–	

=== Semifinals ===
The fastest six runners in each heat advanced to the final round.

==== Semifinal 1 ====
Rank	Athlete	Nation	Time (hand)	Time (automatic)	Notes
1	Denis Johansson	Finland	3:49.4	3:49.60	Q
2	Werner Lueg	Germany	3:49.8	3:50.06	Q
3	Don MacMillan	Australia	3:50.8	3:50.81	Q
4	Warren Druetzler	United States	3:50.8	3:51.16	Q
5	Patrick El Mabrouk	France	3:51.0	3:51.25	Q
6	Audun Boysen	Norway	3:51.0	3:51.33	Q
7	Václav Cevona	Czechoslovakia	3:51.4	3:51.37	
8	Sture Landqvist	Sweden	3:51.4	3:51.45	
9	Bill Nankeville	Great Britain	3:52.0	3:51.93	
10	Bill Parnell	Canada	3:52.4	3:52.91	
11	Mihail Velsvebel	Soviet Union	3:52.6	3:52.58	
12	George Hoskins	New Zealand	3:53.0	3:52.72	

==== Semifinal 2 ====
Rank	Athlete	Nation	Time (hand)	Time (automatic)	Notes
1	Josy Barthel	Luxembourg	3:50.4	3:50.51	Q
2	Olle Åberg	Sweden	3:50.6	3:50.71	Q
3	Ingvar Ericsson	Sweden	3:50.6	3:50.77	Q
4	Bob McMillen	United States	3:50.6	3:50.84	Q
5	Roger Bannister	Great Britain	3:50.6	3:50.92	Q
6	Rolf Lamers	Germany	3:50.8	3:51.30	Q
7	Stanislav Jungwirth	Czechoslovakia	3:51.0	3:51.72	
8	Vilmos Tölgyesi	Hungary	3:53.2	3:53.56	
9	Frans Herman	Belgium	3:53.8	3:54.04	
10	Günter Dohrow	Germany	3:55.2	3:55.27	
11	Mykola Belokurov	Soviet Union	3:55.6	3:55.49	
12	John Ross	Canada	4:00.6	–	

=== Final ===
Rank	Athlete	Nation	Time (hand)	Time (automatic)	Notes
1st place, gold medalist(s)	Josy Barthel	Luxembourg	3:45.2	3:45.28	OR
2nd place, silver medalist(s)	Bob McMillen	United States	3:45.2	3:45.39	
3rd place, bronze medalist(s)	Werner Lueg	Germany	3:45.4	3:45.67	
4	Roger Bannister	Great Britain	3:46.0	3:46.30	NR
5	Patrick El Mabrouk	France	3:46.0	3:46.35	
6	Rolf Lamers	Germany	3:46.8	3:47.18	
7	Olle Åberg	Sweden	3:47.0	3:47.20	
8	Ingvar Ericsson	Sweden	3:47.6	3:47.70	
9	Don MacMillan	Australia	3:49.6	3:49.77	
10	Denis Johansson	Finland	3:49.8	3:50.24	
11	Audun Boysen	Norway	3:51.4	3:51.75	
12	Warren Druetzler	United States	3:56.0	–	
