= 1950 European Athletics Championships – Men's 1500 metres =

Men's 1500 metres at the European Athletics Championships

The men's 1500 metres at the 1950 European Athletics Championships was held in Brussels, Belgium, at Heysel Stadium on 24 and 27 August 1950.

== Medalists ==
Gold	Wim Slijkhuis; Netherlands
Silver	Patrick El Mabrouk; France
Bronze	William Nankeville; Great Britain

== Results ==
=== Final ===
27 August

Rank	Name	Nationality	Time	Notes
1st place, gold medalist(s)	Wim Slijkhuis	Netherlands	3:47.2	CR
2nd place, silver medalist(s)	Patrick El Mabrouk	France	3:47.8	
3rd place, bronze medalist(s)	Bill Nankeville	Great Britain	3:48.0	NR
4	Ilmari Taipale	Finland	3:50.4	
5	Len Eyre	Great Britain	3:51.0	
6	Václav Čevona	Czechoslovakia	3:51.4	
7	Ingvar Ericsson	Sweden	3:52.4	
8	Jean Vernier	France	3:53.2	
9	Andrija Otenhajmer	Yugoslavia	3:53.4	
10	Daniel Janssens	Belgium	3:56.8	
11	Frans Herman	Belgium	4:05.2	
	Lennart Strand	Sweden	DNF	

=== Heats ===
24 August

==== Heat 1 ====
Rank	Name	Nationality	Time	Notes
1	Len Eyre	Great Britain	3:53.0	Q
2	Ilmari Taipale	Finland	3:53.2	Q
3	Frans Herman	Belgium	3:54.6	Q
4	Lennart Strand	Sweden	3:58.2	Q
5	Zdravko Ceraj	Yugoslavia	4:01.8	

==== Heat 2 ====
Rank	Name	Nationality	Time	Notes
1	Jean Vernier	France	3:54.6	Q
2	Ingvar Ericsson	Sweden	3:54.7	Q
3	Andrija Otenhajmer	Yugoslavia	3:55.0	Q
4	Bill Nankeville	Great Britain	3:55.6	Q
5	Hans Harting	Netherlands	3:56.8	
6	Alois Imfeld	Switzerland	4:01.2	
7	Angelo Tagliapietra	Italy	4:01.8	

==== Heat 3 ====
Rank	Name	Nationality	Time	Notes
1	Patrick El Mabrouk	France	4:01.8	Q
2	Wim Slijkhuis	Netherlands	4:02.6	Q
3	Václav Čevona	Czechoslovakia	4:02.8	Q
4	Daniel Janssens	Belgium	4:04.2	Q
5	Bruno Schneider	Austria	4:04.8	
6	Loukas Adamopoulos	Greece	4:06.6	
7	Pétur Einarsson	Iceland	4:08.8	

== Participation ==
According to an unofficial count, 20 athletes from 13 countries participated in the event.

- Austria (1)
- Belgium (2)
- Czechoslovakia (1)
- Finland (1)
- France (2)
- Greece (1)
- Iceland (1)
- Italy (1)
- Netherlands (3)
- Sweden (2)
- Switzerland (1)
- Great Britain (2)
- Yugoslavia (2)
