= 1946 European Athletics Championships – Men's 1500 metres =

Men's 1500 metres at the European Athletics Championships

The men's 1500 metres at the 1946 European Athletics Championships was held in Oslo, Norway, at Bislett Stadion on 24 and 25 August 1946.

== Medalists ==
Gold	Lennart Strand; Sweden
Silver	Henry Eriksson; Sweden
Bronze	Erik Jørgensen; Denmark

== Results ==
=== Final ===
25 August

Rank	Name	Nationality	Time	Notes
1st place, gold medalist(s)	Lennart Strand	Sweden	3:48.0	CR
2nd place, silver medalist(s)	Henry Eriksson	Sweden	3:48.8	
3rd place, bronze medalist(s)	Erik Jørgensen	Denmark	3:52.8	
4	Václav Čevona	Czechoslovakia	3:53.0	NR
5	Sándor Garay	Hungary	3:53.0	
6	Douglas Wilson	Great Britain	3:53.2	
7	Paul Messner	France	3:56.6	
8	Luboš Vomácka	Czechoslovakia	4:07.2	

=== Heats ===
24 August

==== Heat 1 ====
Rank	Name	Nationality	Time	Notes
1	Lennart Strand	Sweden	3:56.6	Q
2	Sándor Garay	Hungary	3:56.8	Q
3	Erik Jørgensen	Denmark	3:57.0	Q
4	Václav Čevona	Czechoslovakia	3:57.4	Q
5	Aleksandr Pugachevskiy	Soviet Union	3:57.6	
6	Óskar Jónsson	Iceland	3:58.4	NR
7	Willy Sponberg	Norway	3:59.2	

==== Heat 2 ====
Rank	Name	Nationality	Time	Notes
1	Henry Eriksson	Sweden	3:54.6	Q
2	Douglas Wilson	Great Britain	3:55.0	Q
3	Paul Messner	France	3:58.0	Q
4	Luboš Vomácka	Czechoslovakia	3:58.8	Q
5	Asbjørn Hansen	Norway	3:59.0	
6	Walter Lutz	Switzerland	4:04.2	
7	Jan Staniszewski	Poland	4:10.8	

== Participation ==
According to an unofficial count, 14 athletes from 11 countries participated in the event.

- Denmark (1)
- Czechoslovakia (2)
- France (1)
- Hungary (1)
- Iceland (1)
- Norway (2)
- Poland (1)
- Soviet Union (1)
- Sweden (2)
- Switzerland (1)
- Great Britain (1)
