= Bob McMillen =

Bob McMillen may refer to:

- Bob McMillen (athlete) (1928–2007), American middle-distance runner and steeplechaser
- Bob McMillen (American football) (born 1970), football player and coach

== See also ==
- Bob MacMillan (born 1952), Canadian ice hockey forward
