= Luoto (surname) =

Luoto is a Finnish surname. Notable people with the surname include:

- Olavi Luoto (1927–2017), Finnish middle-distance runner
- Kati Luoto (born 1972), Finnish strength athlete
- Iiro Luoto (born 1984), American football tight end
- Joona Luoto (born 1997), Finnish professional hockey player
