= Pystynen =

Pystynen is a surname. Notable people with the name include:

- Aulis Pystynen (1928–1996), Finnish middle-distance runner
- Erkki Pystynen (born 1929), Finnish professor and politician
- Paavo Pystynen (1932–2021), Finnish long-distance runner
- Ville Pystynen, Finnish musician
