= Henry Klein =

Henry Klein or Henri Klein is the name of:

- Henri Klein (athlete), French runner
- Henry Klein (athlete), US Virgin Islands race walker
- Henri Klein (footballer), Luxembourgish footballer
- Henry Klein (soldier), American soldier

== See also ==
- Henry Cline, British doctor
