= Cathedral High School (Los Angeles) =

Private school in Los Angeles, California, United States

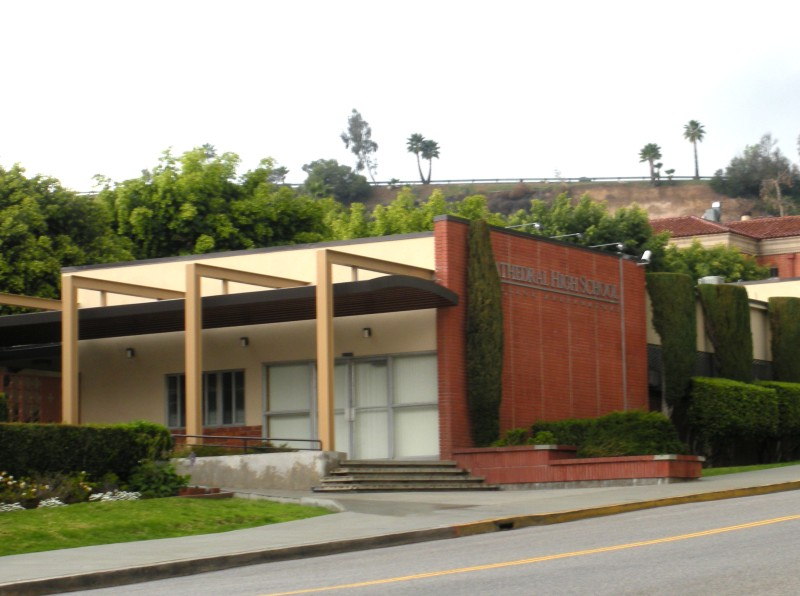
- Cathedral High School entrance

Location
- 1253 Bishops Road; Los Angeles, California 90012; United States; 34°4′12″N 118°14′4″W

Information
- Type: Private, Day, College-prep
- Motto: Signum Fidei ("Sign of the Faith")
- Religious affiliation: Roman Catholic
- Established: 1925; 101 years ago
- Oversight: Institute of the Brothers of the Christian Schools
- President: Martin Farfan
- Principal: Arturo Lopez
- Grades: 9-12
- Gender: Boys
- Campus type: Urban
- Colors: Royal Purple and White
- Song: Hail Cathedral Hail
- Athletics conference: CIF Southern Section; Del Rey League
- Nickname: Phantoms
- Accreditation: Western Association of Schools and Colleges
- Yearbook: The Chimes
- Website: www.cathedralhighschool.org

Los Angeles Historic-Cultural Monument
- Designated: 1984
- Reference no.: 281

Cathedral High School is a private, college preparatory Catholic all-boys school in Los Angeles, California.

== History ==
Cathedral High School was founded by Archbishop John Joseph Cantwell as the first Los Angeles Archdiocesan high school for boys in Fall 1925. The school was built on the site of old Calvary Cemetery, where leading families of Los Angeles were buried until relocated at the turn of the 20th century. It is just northeast of downtown Los Angeles.

Cathedral was the first high school for boys established by the Archdiocese. The Christian Brothers have administered the school since its founding and In 1996, a historic agreement was reached with the Archdiocese allowing the school to operate as a private Lasallian institution. Cathedral's location allows for a view of the Los Angeles skyline and the new Cathedral of Our Lady of the Angels and adjacent to Dodger Stadium in Chávez Ravine and Chinatown, Los Angeles, California.The school was designated Los Angeles Historic-Cultural Monument number 281 in 1984.

The school athletics teams are nicknamed the Phantoms because of its location on the old cemetery.

=== Campus renovation ===
Plans were announced in 2003 for a new building to house classrooms and the gym. The building was funded mainly by donations. Construction began in 2005 with the demolition of the old, sixty-five-year-old gym and was complete in 2007. The new building houses items from the previous building, including the old scoreboard and wood floor. In 2023, their old track and field had been replaced with new grass and rubber ahead of the upcoming 100th year anniversary.

== Filming ==
Cathedral High School has been the film location for a number of films, television shows, and music videos, due to its view of the Los Angeles skyline and character of its architecture, including the films City of Angels (1998), All You've Got (2006), Be Somebody (2016), North Hollywood (2021), the music video "I Do!!" by Toya, and "Mesmerize" by Ja Rule featuring Ashanti, a 2010 episode of Bones, an episode of the Netflix series Lucifer, episodes of Bel-Air, and others.

All You've Got used Cathedral's colors (purple and white) and name (Phantoms) for a volleyball team featured in the film. Additionally, during the 2004 NBA All-Star Game, George Gervin, used the original gym for filming.

== Notable alumni ==
- Kent Carter, American football linebacker
- Sal Castro, American educator and activist
- Eric "Bobo" Correa, percussionist and a member of the Beastie Boys and Cypress Hill.
- Gary Finneran, American football defensive end
- Darryl Hickman, American actor
- Dwayne Hickman, American actor and director
- Isaiah Jewett, 2020 Olympian in the 800 meters
- Xolo Maridueña, American actor known for his roles in Cobra Kai and Blue Beetle
- Bobby McFerrin, American jazz singer and songwriter
- Bob McMillen, 1952 Summer Olympic silver medalist in the men's 1500 meters
- Torry McTyer, American football cornerback
- Ken Rudolph, American baseball catcher
- Antonio Villaraigosa, served as 41st Mayor of Los Angeles (expelled in his Junior year)
- Bryce Young, American football quarterback, 2021 Heisman Trophy winner, selected as 1st pick in the 2023 NFL draft by the Carolina Panthers (transferred to Mater Dei in his Sophomore year)
