= Jean Vernier =

French middle-distance runner

Jean Vernier (21 July 1923 – 8 July 2006) was a French runner who specialized in the 1500 meters race. He was the twin brother of the athlete Jacques Vernier. He was born in Grand-Charmont and died in Saint-Priest-en-Jarez.

He won the 1500 meter race at the French Athletics Championships in 1947. He went on to represent France in the 1948 and 1952 Summer Olympics in their 1500 meter races. He placed eighth in the 1950 European Athletics Championships in the 1500 meter race.
