= Kaare Vefling =

Norwegian middle-distance runner

Personal information
- Nationality: Norwegian
- Born: 19 May 1920 Sandefjord, Norway
- Died: 6 September 2001 (aged 81) Sandefjord, Norway

Sport
- Sport: Middle-distance running
- Event: 1500 metres

Kaare Vefling (19 May 1920 – 6 September 2001) was a Norwegian middle-distance runner. He competed in the men's 1500 metres at the 1948 Summer Olympics.
