= Nikolay Kuchurin =

Soviet middle-distance runner

Personal information
- Nationality: Soviet
- Born: 11 October 1927
- Died: 16 June 1995 (aged 67)

Sport
- Sport: Middle-distance running
- Event: 1500 metres

Nikolay Kuchurin (11 October 1927 – 16 June 1995) was a Soviet middle-distance runner. He competed in the men's 1500 metres at the 1952 Summer Olympics.
