= Athol Jennings =

South African middle-distance runner (1930–2024)

Personal information
- Full name: Athol Raymond Jennings
- Nationality: South African
- Born: 19 November 1930 Cape Town, South Africa
- Died: 10 February 2024 (aged 93)

Sport
- Sport: Middle-distance running
- Event: 1500 metres

Athol Raymond Jennings (19 November 1930 – 10 February 2024) was a South African middle-distance runner. He competed in the men's 1500 metres at the 1952 Summer Olympics.

Jennings was later ordained as a minister in the Methodist Church of Southern Africa and in the 1970s was head of the church's education department.

Jennings was headmaster of the Waterford Kamhlaba School in eSwatini from 1975 to 1984. He died on 10 February 2024, at the age of 93.
