= Fritz Prossinagg =

Austrian middle-distance runner (1930–2022)

Personal information
- Nationality: Austrian
- Born: 12 August 1930
- Died: 16 February 2023 (aged 92)

Sport
- Sport: Middle-distance running
- Event: 1500 metres

Fritz Prossinagg (12 August 1930 – 16 February 2023) was an Austrian middle-distance runner. He competed in the men's 1500 metres at the 1952 Summer Olympics.
