= Mykola Belokurov =

Soviet middle-distance runner

Personal information
- Nationality: Soviet
- Born: 3 October 1926 Kazan, Russian SFSR
- Died: 30 August 2006 (aged 79) Dnipropetrovsk, Ukraine

Sport
- Sport: Middle-distance running
- Event: 1500 metres

Mykola Belokurov (3 October 1926 – 30 August 2006) was a Soviet middle-distance runner. He competed in the men's 1500 metres at the 1952 Summer Olympics.
