= Pierre Gillet =

French middle-distance runner

Personal information
- Nationality: French
- Born: 25 February 1930
- Died: 11 August 2008 (aged 78)

Sport
- Sport: Middle-distance running
- Event: 1500 metres

Pierre Gillet (25 February 1930 – 11 August 2008) was a French middle-distance runner. He competed in the men's 1500 metres at the 1952 Summer Olympics.
