= Ingvard Nielsen =

Danish middle-distance runner

Personal information
- Nationality: Danish
- Born: Ingvard Børge Baunsgaard Nielsen; 6 July 1925 Odense, Denmark
- Died: 16 May 2010 (aged 84) Odense, Denmark

Sport
- Sport: Middle-distance running
- Event: 1500 metres

Ingvard Nielsen (6 July 1925 – 16 May 2010) was a Danish middle-distance runner. He competed in the men's 1500 metres at the 1948 Summer Olympics.
