= Willem Slijkhuis =

Dutch middle distance runner (1923–2003)

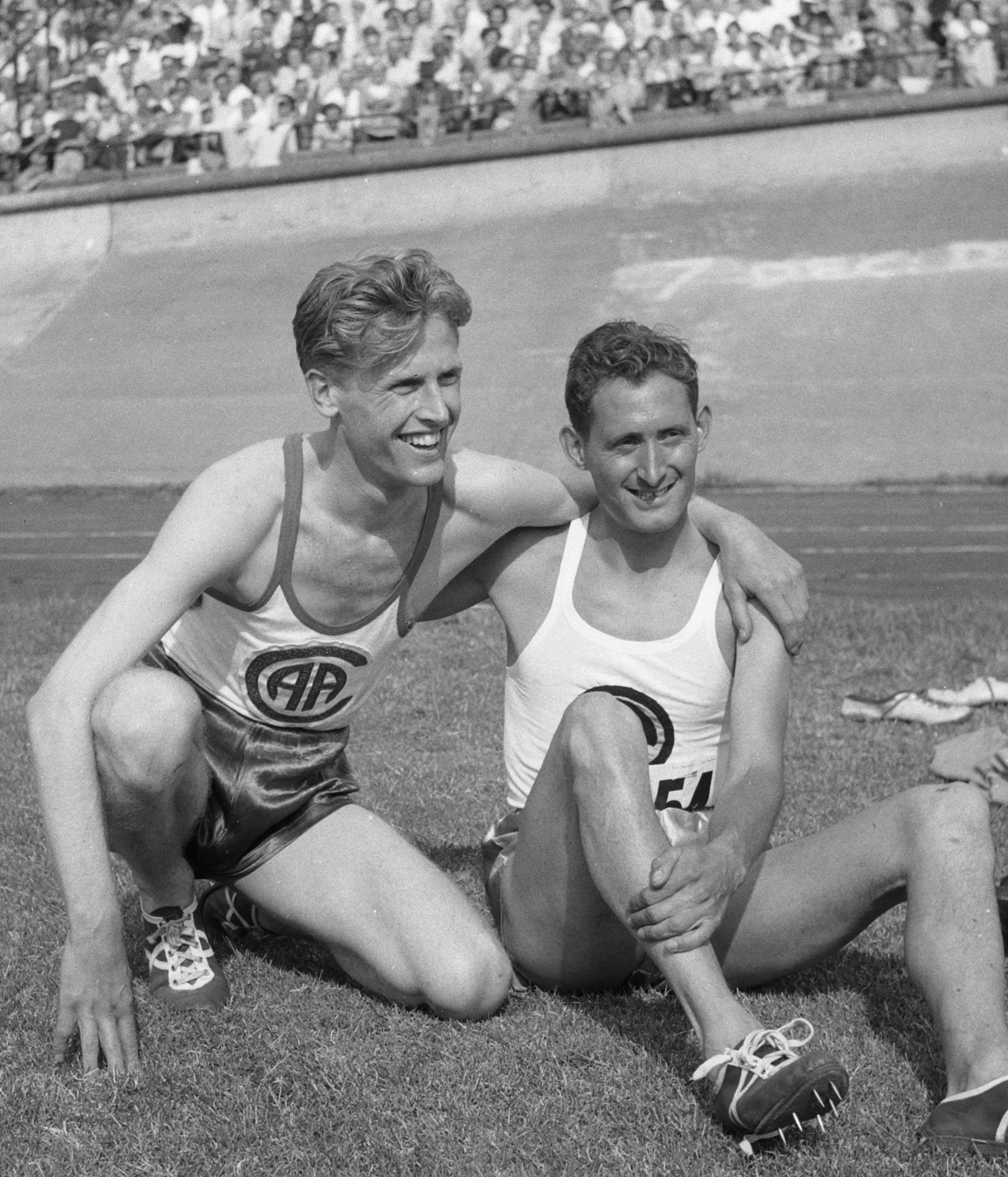
- Hans Harting and Wim Slijkhuis (right) in 1951

Personal information
- Born: 13 January 1923 Leiden, Netherlands
- Died: 28 June 2003 (aged 80) Badhoevedorp, Netherlands
- Height: 1.74 m (5 ft 9 in)
- Weight: 62 kg (137 lb)

Sport
- Sport: Middle-distance running
- Club: AAC, Amsterdam
Medal record
Men's athletics
Representing the Netherlands
Olympic Games
Bronze medal – third place	1948 London	1500 m
Bronze medal – third place	1948 London	5000 m
European Championships
Gold medal – first place	1950 Brussels	1500 m
Silver medal – second place	1946 Oslo	5000 m

Willem Frederik "Wim" Slijkhuis (13 January 1923 – 28 June 2003) was a Dutch athlete. During his career that lasted from 1939 to 1954 he was a world's top middle distance runner, excelling in distances from 1500 to 5000 metres.

== Biography ==
Slijkhuis began his international sports career shortly after World War II, having competed nationally since 1939. In 1946, he won a silver medal in the 5000 m at the European Championships in Oslo.

Slijkhuis won the British AAA Championships title in the 3 miles event at the 1948 AAA Championships. Shortly afterwards he took part in the 1948 Summer Olympics in London, and was a favourite to win a medal. In the 5000 m he finished third, behind Belgian Gaston Reiff and the legendary Emil Zátopek; nevertheless Slijkhuis was not satisfied. In the 1500 m, his second event, he could have done better, but started his final sprint to the finish line too late to catch the two leading Swedes, who finished narrowly ahead of him. In spite of this, realising 3:50.4 he equalled his own Dutch record, set two years earlier. Slijkhuis' achievements were overshadowed, however, by the performances of compatriot Fanny Blankers-Koen, who won four gold medals at the same Olympics.

In 1950, Slijkhuis did win a major title: the 1500 m at the European championships held in Brussels, with a time of 3:47.2. His personal best at this distance had already been improved to 3:43.8, realised one year earlier in Antwerp and only 0.8 s away from the existing world record at the time.

During his career Willem Slijkhuis didn't just run almost everywhere in Europe, but also in New Zealand, South Africa and the United States. He was the first Dutchman who competed in the US Indoor circuit and the first non-American, who ever succeeded in obtaining the US title over one mile.

Owing to his stubborn behaviour Slijkhuis sometimes clashed with officials of the Dutch Athletics Federation, who he accused of outrageous interference. On the track however he impressed experts and public with his smooth, steady running style. Especially the English were delighted about his beautiful running style, which they lyrically described as "The Poetry of motion".

His second Olympic participation in the 1952 Summer Olympics ended without any successes. Slijkhuis, who won eleven national titles – including eight in the men's 5000 metres – on track, seven in Cross country running and set thirty Dutch records, ended his career in 1954 due to injuries. He died on 28 June 2003 in Badhoevedorp.

== Notes ==
- Weisscher, L. (1966) Wim Slijkhuis, een groot atleet. De Atletiekwereld nrs. 12 + 13: KNAU
- Bijkerk, T. (2004) Olympisch Oranje. De Vrieseborch ISBN 90-6076-522-2
- ARRS site

Awards
Preceded by Joop Overdijk	KNAU Cup; 1950	Succeeded by Nico Lutkeveld
