= Erik Jørgensen (athlete) =

Danish middle-distance runner

Personal information
- Nationality: Danish
- Born: 21 April 1920
- Died: 9 June 2005 (aged 85)

Sport
- Sport: Middle-distance running
- Event: 1500 metres
Medal record
Men's athletics
Representing Denmark
European Championships
Bronze medal – third place	1946 Oslo	1500 m

Erik Jørgensen (21 April 1920 – 9 June 2005) was a Danish middle-distance runner. He competed in the men's 1500 metres at the 1948 Summer Olympics.
