= Kent Carter (gridiron football) =

American football player (born 1950)

No. 51
- Position: Linebacker

Personal information
- Born: May 25, 1950 (age 76); Los Angeles, California, U.S.
- Listed height: 6 ft 3 in (1.91 m)
- Listed weight: 235 lb (107 kg)

Career information
- High school: Cathedral (CA)
- College: USC
- NFL draft: 1972: 17th round, 422nd overall pick

Career history
- St. Louis Cardinals (1972)*; New England Patriots (1974); Ottawa Rough Riders (1975); Edmonton Eskimos (1976); Hamilton Tiger-Cats (1976–1977); Toronto Argonauts (1978)
- * Offseason or practice squad member only
- Stats at Pro Football Reference

Kent Carter (born May 25, 1950) is an American former professional football player who was a linebacker for the New England Patriots of the National Football League (NFL) and the Ottawa Rough Riders, Edmonton Eskimos, Hamilton Tiger-Cats and Toronto Argonauts of the Canadian Football League (CFL). He played college football for the USC Trojans.

== College career ==
Carter played college football at the University of Southern California. He joined the Trojans for his junior year after playing for Los Angeles City College. Los Angeles Times staff writer Jeff Prugh described him as "quick" and "hard-hitting." He played his first games for the Trojans at the end of his junior year and then started for most of the first half of his senior year before being relegated to the bench for the latter part of his senior year. He said of his relegation:

I never got an explanation as to why. I thought I looked good in practice. I got compliments from the coaches. They raved about my hitting. Oh, I was making mistakes, but the guy who replaced me was making them too. At least I was getting the job done. I felt I should have been given a second chance.

== Professional career ==
He was selected 422nd overall by the St. Louis Cardinals in the 17th round of the 1972 NFL draft despite only having been a part time player in college. Cardinals scout Bo Bolinger stated during the Cardinals 1972 training camp that "He's a good athlete. That's why we picked him. He hasn't surprised me so far in his athletic ability. His enthusiasm is better than I would have thought. You can tell he wants to be a football player." Carter also impressed Cardinals' assistant coach Chuck Drulis, who said that "The kid is a hitter...He's going to push people [for a job]. And I'm sure he'll do well on the special teams." Nonetheless, he was waived by the Cardinals during the 1972 preseason.

The Patriots signed Carter in March 1974. He injured his knee during training camp and required surgery to repair it, and was placed on injured reserve. He was reactivated in December 1974 and played in two games for the Patriots – on December 1 against the Oakland Raiders and on December 15 against the Miami Dolphins. He was credited with half a sack in those games.

The Patriots waived Carter during their 1975 training camp and he signed with the Rough Riders and played with them for the 1975 season, appearing in 10 games. Before the 1976 season he was acquired by the Eskimos. He played one game for the Eskimos as a defensive end and was injured; after missing eight games he returned and reverted to being a linebacker. The Tiger-Cats acquired him from the Eskimos in October 1976. He played in 4 games for the Eskimos and 3 games for the Tiger-Cats in 1976. He was cut by the Tiger-Cats during the 1977 season after playing in 7 games.

In 1978 he was signed by the Toronto Argonauts for a 5 day trial, but released after dressing for 2 games, and then was re-signed with Hamilton on a 5 day trial when Ray Nettles was injured but did not appear in any games. In 1979 he signed with the Toronto Grizzlies of the Mid-Atlantic Football League. He had played a total of 26 games in the CFL.
