= Vilmos Tölgyesi =

Hungarian athletics competitor

Personal information
- Nationality: Hungarian
- Born: 29 March 1931
- Died: 12 February 1970 (aged 38) Budapest, Hungary

Sport
- Sport: Middle-distance running
- Event: 1500 metres

Vilmos Tölgyesi (29 March 1931 – 12 February 1970) was a Hungarian middle-distance runner. He competed in the men's 1500 metres at the 1952 Summer Olympics.
