= Rolf Lamers =

German middle-distance runner

Personal information
- Nationality: German
- Born: 8 July 1927
- Died: 17 October 2016 (aged 89)

Sport
- Sport: Middle-distance running
- Event: 1500 metres

Rolf Lamers (8 July 1927 – 17 October 2016) was a German middle-distance runner. He competed in the men's 1500 metres at the 1952 Summer Olympics.
