= Kälarne IK =

Swedish sports club

- Full name: Kälarne idrottsklubb
- Sport: soccer, alpine skiing, rowing track and field athletics (earlier)
- Founded: 14 February 1920
- Based in: Kälarne, Sweden
- Arena: Ånäset IP

Kälarne IK is a sports club in Kälarne, Sweden, established on 14 February 1920.

The women's soccer team played in the Swedish top division in 1978.

Other famous people are track and field athletes Henry Kälarne and Gunder Hägg and cross-country skier Alfred Dahlqvist, who at different occasions have competed for the club.
