= Mihail Velsvebel =

Estonian middle-distance runner

Personal information
- Nationality: Estonian
- Born: 9 November 1926 Kuressaare, Estonia
- Died: 21 November 2008 (aged 82) Tallinn, Estonia

Sport
- Sport: Middle-distance running
- Event: 1500 metres

Mihail Velsvebel (9 November 1926 – 21 November 2008) was an Estonian middle-distance runner. He competed in the men's 1500 metres at the 1952 Summer Olympics, representing the Soviet Union.
