= Warren Druetzler =

American middle-distance runner

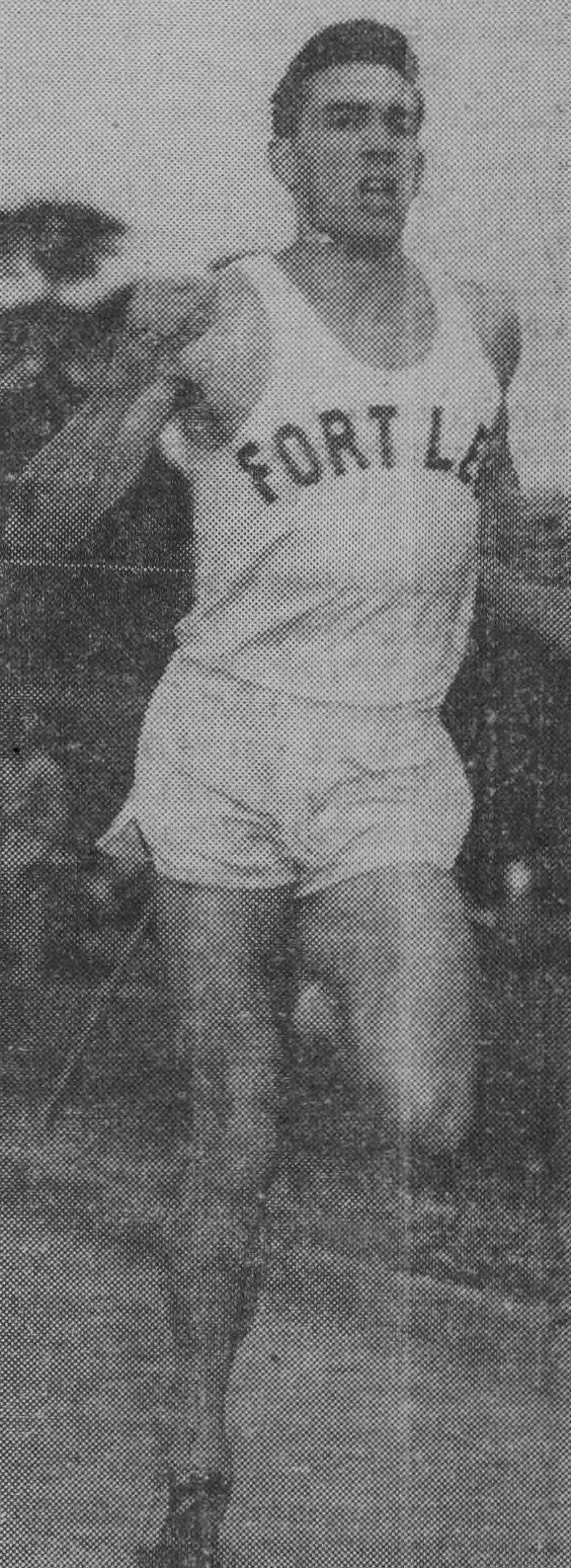
Druetzler, c. 1952

Warren Oliver Druetzler (June 8, 1929 – September 21, 2017) was an American athlete, who competed mainly in the 1500 m. Druetzler was a finalist in the 1500 m at the 1952 Summer Olympics.

== College career ==
Growing up in Illinois, he ran for Lyons Township High School where he set the state record in the mile that stood for 23 years. He was the 1947 IHSA State Champion.

In cross country running Druetzler was a 3-time NCAA top-10 placer and national runner-up (1950) individually for the Michigan State Spartans. He was also a member of two national champion teams (1948 and 1949) and one runner-up team (1950) at the NCAA Men's Division I Cross Country Championship.

In track and field Druetzler won the NCAA Men's Division I Outdoor Track and Field Championships title in the mile run in 1951. He was also a member of the 4x880 yard relay team that set the world record in 1950. That year he was also the United States national champion in the 3000 meters steeplechase.

He continued in the sport as an official.

== Olympic career ==
At the 1952 Olympics Druetzler won his heat, finished 4th in his semi-final, and finished 12th in the final.

== Military career ==
Druetzler served in the United States Army where he achieved the rank of Captain by the time he retired from the reserves.
