= John Joe Barry =

Irish middle-distance runner

Personal information
- Nationality: Irish
- Born: 5 October 1925 Joliet, Illinois, United States
- Died: 9 December 1994 (aged 69)

Sport
- Sport: Middle-distance running
- Event: 1500 metres

John Joe Barry (5 October 1925 – 9 December 1994) was an Irish middle-distance runner. He competed in the men's 1500 metres at the 1948 Summer Olympics.
