= Gösta Bergkvist =

Swedish middle-distance runner

Sven Gösta Bergkvist (29 March 1920 – 5 October 2015) was a Swedish athlete who ran at the 1948 Summer Olympics in London, where he finished fifth out of 36 competitors in the men's 1500 metres event. He was born in Sågmyra and competed out of Gefle IF. He was the Swedish national cross-country champion in 1947 and 1948.
