= Karl-Heinz Hubler =

Swiss middle-distance runner

Personal information
- Nationality: Swiss
- Born: 28 November 1928

Sport
- Sport: Middle-distance running
- Event: 1500 metres

Karl-Heinz Hubler (born 28 November 1928) is a Swiss former middle-distance runner. He competed in the men's 1500 metres at the 1948 Summer Olympics.
