= Richard Morris (runner) =

British middle-distance runner

Personal information
- Nationality: British (English)
- Born: 9 July 1921 Edmonton, Alberta, Canada
- Died: 9 November 1995 (aged 74) Lewes, England

Sport
- Sport: Athletics
- Event: Middle-distance running
- Club: Milocarian Athletic Club

Richard Arthur Morris (9 July 1921 – 9 November 1995) was a British middle-distance runner who competed at the 1948 Summer Olympics.

== Biography ==
Morris was born in Canada but moved to London at a young age. He was a late starter into athletics, only running in spiked running shoes shortly before the 1948 Olympic Games. He had previously run in rubber-soled slippers.

His progression was fast and he was described as one of the outstanding finds of the season. He represented the Great Britain team at the 1948 Olympic Games in London, where he competed in the men's 1500 metres competition.

The following season he finished second behind Bill Nankeville in the 1 mile event at the 1949 AAA Championships.

Morris was a captain in the Royal Engineers and won the Army Championships in 1949 and 1950.
