= George Hoskins (athlete) =

New Zealand runner (1928–2000)

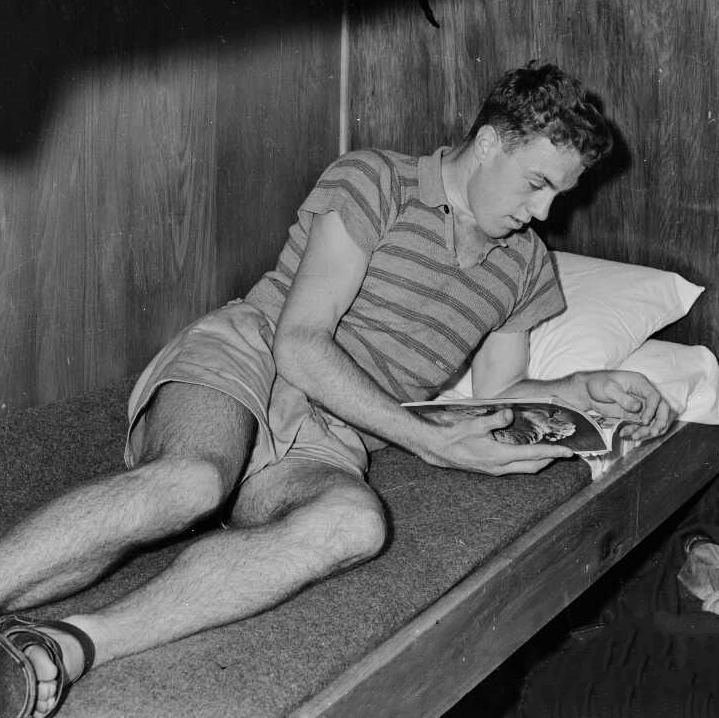
- Hoskins at the 1950 British Empire Games

Personal information
- Full name: George Woodbourne Hoskins
- Born: 25 September 1928 Lower Hutt, New Zealand
- Died: 23 January 2000 (aged 71)

Sport
- Country: New Zealand
- Sport: Athletics

Achievements and titles
- National finals: 880 yds champion (1953); 3 miles champion (1950, 1951, 1952)
- Personal bests: 1500 m – 3:52.72 (1952); 3 miles – 14:15.6 (1952)

George Woodbourne Hoskins (25 September 1928 – 23 January 2000) was a New Zealand runner, who competed at the 1952 Olympics in the 1500 m and 5000 m. He won his 1500 m heat, but finished last in his semi-final. He failed to finish his 5000 m heat. At the national level, Hoskins won the under-19 2 miles and under-19 cross-country titles in 1947, the 3 miles championships in 1950, 1951 and 1952, and the 880 yards title in 1953.
