= Henry Eriksson =

Swedish middle-distance runner

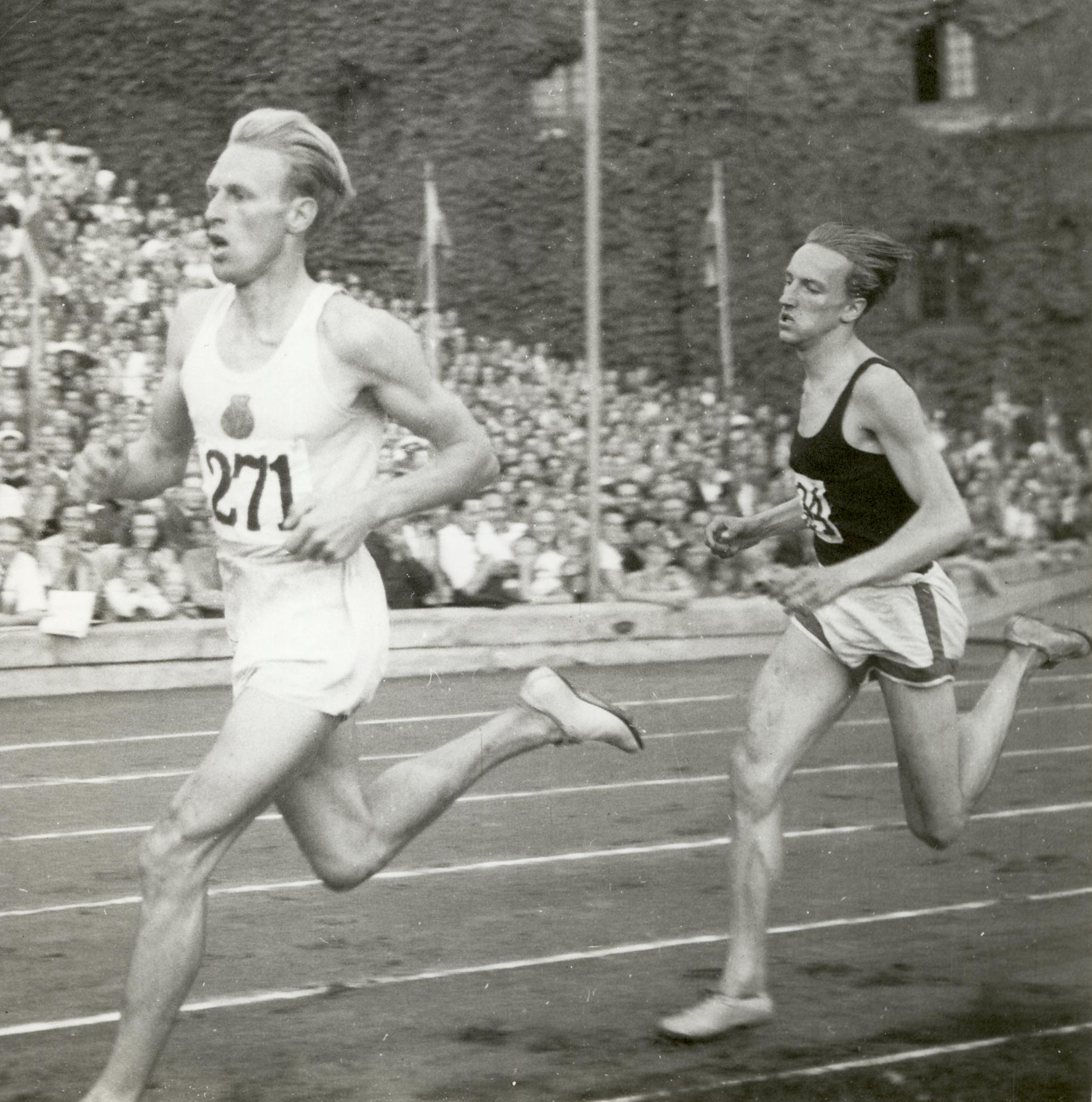
- Henry Eriksson (left) and Lennart Strand at the 1947 national championships

Personal information
- Born: 23 January 1920 Krylbo, Sweden
- Died: 8 January 2000 (aged 79) Gävle, Sweden
- Height: 1.84 m (6 ft 0 in)
- Weight: 73 kg (161 lb)

Sport
- Sport: Athletics
- Events: 1500 m, 5000 m
- Club: Gefle IF, Gävle

Achievements and titles
- Personal bests: 1500 m – 3:44.4 (1947); 5000 m – 14:40.2 (1947)
Medal record
Men's athletics
Representing Sweden
Olympic Games
Gold medal – first place	1948 London	1500 m
European Championships
Silver medal – second place	1946 Oslo	1500 m

Knut Henry "Krylbo" Eriksson (23 January 1920 – 8 January 2000) was a Swedish middle-distance runner who specialized in the 1500 m event. In 1946 he finished second behind Lennart Strand, both at the national and European Championships. On 15 July 1947, at the national championships at Malmö, Eriksson and Strand had a very close 1500 m race. Strand won, equaling the world record at 3:43.0, and Eriksson finished second, setting his all-time personal best at 3:44.4. Eriksson beat Strand at the 1948 Swedish Championships and at the 1948 Summer Olympics. He retired the same year and returned to his work as a fireman.

Eriksson was one of the three Olympic Flame lighters of the 1956 Summer Olympics equestrian events at Stockholm. He held a world record in the 4 × 1500 m relay, together with three other fireman from his athletics club in Gävle.
