= Werner Lueg =

German middle-distance runner

Olympic medal record

Men's Athletics

Representing Germany
Bronze medal – third place	1952 Helsinki	1500 metres

Werner Lueg (16 September 1931 – 13 July 2014) was a West German middle distance runner who equalised Lennart Strand's and Gunder Hägg's 1500 m world record in 3:43.0 min in Berlin in 1952. He and Otto Peltzer are the only Germans to have held the 1500 m world record. He also won a bronze medal over 1500 m at the 1952 Summer Olympics in Helsinki. The Olympic final was won by Josy Barthel. Lueg was born in Brackwede, near Bielefeld.

Records
Preceded by (Sweden) Gunder Hägg	Men's 1,500m World Record Holder; 29 June 1952 – 2 August 1954	Succeeded by (United States) Wes Santee
Preceded by (Sweden) Gunder Hägg (Sweden) Lennart Strand	European Record Holder Men's 1500m 29 June 1952 – 28 July 1955	Succeeded by (Hungary) Sandor Iharos
