= Javier Montez =

American middle-distance runner

Personal information
- Nationality: American
- Born: December 5, 1929
- Died: December 6, 2003 (aged 74)

Sport
- Sport: Middle-distance running
- Event: 1500 metres

Javier Montez (December 5, 1929 – December 6, 2003) was an American middle-distance runner. He competed in the men's 1500 metres at the 1952 Summer Olympics.
