= Clem Eischen =

American middle-distance runner (1926–2020)

Personal information
- Nationality: American
- Born: December 24, 1926
- Died: December 7, 2020 (aged 93)

Sport
- Sport: Middle-distance running
- Event: 1500 metres

Clem Eischen (December 24, 1926 – December 7, 2020) was an American middle-distance runner. He competed in the men's 1500 metres at the 1948 Summer Olympics.

Eischen competed for the Washington State Cougars track and field team in the NCAA.
