= Mieczysław Długoborski =

Polish middle-distance runner (1931–2020)

Personal information
- Nationality: Polish
- Born: 10 January 1931 Pruszków, Poland
- Died: 4 April 2020 (aged 89)
- Height: 1.70 m (5 ft 7 in)
- Weight: 55 kg (121 lb)

Sport
- Sport: Middle-distance running
- Event: 1500 metres
- Club: Spójnia Wrocław (1949–1951); Gwardia Warsaw (1951–1952); Kolejarz -Polonia Warsaw (1953–1956).

Mieczysław Długoborski (10 January 1931 – 4 April 2020) was a Polish middle-distance runner. He competed in the men's 1500 metres at the 1952 Summer Olympics.

== International competitions ==
Year	Competition	Venue	Position	Event	Notes
Representing Poland
1952	Olympic Games	Helsinki, Finland	36th (h)	1500 m	3:57.70

== Personal bests ==
- 800 metres – 1:54.2h (Elbląg 1953)
- 1500 metres – 3:53.4h (Kraków 1952)
