= Men's 1500 metres European record progression =

The following table shows the European record progression in the men's 1500 metres, as ratified by the EAA.

The current European record is 3:27.14 by Jakob Ingebrigtsen of Norway, pending ratification. The record was set on 16 July 2023 at the 2023 Kamila Skolimowska Memorial.

== Hand timing ==
| Time | Athlete | Nationality | Venue | Date |
|---|---|---|---|---|
| 3:54.7 | John Zander | Sweden | Stockholm, Sweden | August 5, 1917 |
| 3:52.6 | Paavo Nurmi | Finland | Helsinki, Finland | June 19, 1924 |
| 3:51.0 | Otto Peltzer | Germany | Berlin, Germany | September 11, 1926 |
| 3:49.2 | Jules Ladoumegue | France | Paris, France | October 5, 1930 |
| 3:49.2 | Luigi Beccali | Italy | Turin, Italy | September 9, 1933 |
| 3:49.0 | Luigi Beccali | Italy | Milan, Italy | September 17, 1933 |
| 3:48.6 | Miklós Szabó | Hungary | Budapest, Hungary | October 3, 1937 |
| 3:47.6 (a) | Gunder Hägg | Sweden | Stockholm, Sweden | August 10, 1941 |
| 3:45.8 | Gunder Hägg | Sweden | Stockholm, Sweden | July 17, 1942 |
| 3:45.0 | Arne Andersson | Sweden | Gothenburg, Sweden | August 17, 1943 |
| 3:43.0 | Gunder Hägg | Sweden | Gothenburg, Sweden | July 17, 1944 |
| 3:43.0 | Lennart Strand | Sweden | Malmö, Sweden | July 15, 1947 |
| 3:43.0 | Werner Lueg | West Germany | Berlin, West Germany | June 29, 1952 |
| 3:42.4 | Sandor Iharos | Hungary | Oslo, Norway | August 3, 1954 |
| 3:40.8 | Sandor Iharos | Hungary | Helsinki, Finland | July 28, 1955 |
| 3:40.8 | Laszlo Tabori | Hungary | Oslo, Norway | September 6, 1955 |
| 3:40.8 | Gunnar Nielsen | Denmark | Oslo, Norway | September 6, 1955 |
| 3:40.6 (b) | Istvan Rozsavolgyi | Hungary | Tata, Hungary | August 3, 1956 |
| 3:40.2 | Olavi Salsola | Finland | Turku, Finland | July 11, 1957 |
| 3:40.2 | Olavi Salonen | Finland | Turku, Finland | July 11, 1957 |
| 3:38.1 | Stanislav Jungwirth | Czechoslovakia | Stará Boleslav, Czechoslovakia | July 12, 1957 |
| 3:37.8 | Michel Jazy | France | Paris, France | July 28, 1963 |
| 3:36.4 | Jürgen May | West Germany | Erfurt, East Germany | July 14, 1965 |
| 3:36.3 | Michel Jazy | France | Sochaux, France | June 25, 1966 |
| 3:34.0 | Jean Wadoux | France | Paris, France | July 23, 1970 |
| 3:32.8 | Sebastian Coe | United Kingdom | Oslo, Norway | July 17, 1979 |

(a) Sometimes given as 3:47.5.
(b) Sometimes given as 3:40.5.

== Automatic timing ==
| Ratified |
| Not ratified |
| Ratified but later rescinded |
| Pending ratification |

| Time | Athlete | Nationality | Venue | Date |
|---|---|---|---|---|
| 3:32.03 (a) | Sebastian Coe | United Kingdom | Zürich, Switzerland | August 15, 1979 |
| 3:32.09 (a) | Steve Ovett | United Kingdom | Oslo, Norway | July 15, 1980 |
| 3:31.36 | Steve Ovett | United Kingdom | Koblenz, Germany | August 27, 1980 |
| 3:30.77 | Steve Ovett | United Kingdom | Rieti, Italy | September 4, 1983 |
| 3:29.67 | Steve Cram | United Kingdom | Nice, France | July 16, 1985 |
| 3:28.95 | Fermín Cacho | Spain | Zürich, Switzerland | August 13, 1997 |
| 3:28.81 | Mo Farah | United Kingdom | Monaco | July 19, 2013 |
| 3:28.68 | Jakob Ingebrigtsen | Norway | Monaco | August 14, 2020 |
| 3:28.32 | Jakob Ingebrigtsen | Norway | Tokyo, Japan | August 7, 2021 |
| 3:27.95 | Jakob Ingebrigtsen | Norway | Oslo, Norway | June 15, 2023 |
| 3:27.14 | Jakob Ingebrigtsen | Norway | Chorzów, Poland | July 16, 2023 |
| 3:26.73 | Jakob Ingebrigtsen | Norway | Monaco | July 12, 2024 |

(a) = Timed electronically at a time when records were ratified at intervals of one tenth of a second, these were considered equivalent performances.
