= Satid Leangtanom =

Thai middle-distance runner

Personal information
- Nationality: Thai
- Born: 11 April 1929
- Died: Between 2015 and 2021

Sport
- Sport: Middle-distance running
- Event: 1500 metres

Satid Leangtanom (born 11 April 1929) was a Royal Thai Air Force instructor, with the rank of squadron leader when he wrote a 1970 textbook on wilderness survival training. As a middle-distance runner, He competed in the men's 1500 metres at the 1952 Summer Olympics.
