= Stanisław Olczyk =

Polish ice hockey player

- Born: 15 October 1932; Zgierz, Poland
- Died: 23 January 1996 (aged 63); Zgierz, Poland
- Height: 5 ft 7 in (170 cm)
- Weight: 152 lb (69 kg; 10 st 12 lb)
- Position: Defence
- Shot: Left
- Played for: Włókniarz Zgierz; Legia Warsaw
- National team: Poland
- Playing career: 1947–1971

Stanisław Olczyk (15 October 1932 – 23 January 1996) was a Polish ice hockey player. He played for Włókniarz Zgierz and Legia Warsaw during his career. With Legia Olczyk won the Polish hockey league championship seven times. He also played for the Polish national team at several world championships as well as the 1956 and 1964 Winter Olympics. He was also awarded the Silver Cross of Merit for his services.
