= Toshiaki Okamura =

Taiwanese baseball player (1912–1996)

- Outfielder
- Born: May 4, 1912; Karenkō Prefecture, Japanese Taiwan
- Died: January 25, 1996 (aged 83)
- Batted: Left Threw: Left

Japanese Baseball League debut
- 1939, for the Nankai Club

Teams
- As player: Nankai Hawks (1939–1944, 1946–1949); As coach: Nankai Hawks farm team coach (1950–1960)

Toshiaki Okamura (岡村 俊昭; 4 May 1912 – 25 January 1996), also known as Yeh Tien-sung (Chinese: 葉天送; Wade–Giles: Yeh^{4} Tien^{1}-sung^{4}), was a Taiwanese baseball outfielder who played for the Nankai Hawks of the Japanese Baseball League (JBL) from 1939 to 1949.

== Early life and education ==
Born in Karenkō Prefecture, Taiwan, Okamura was a member of the famed Noko baseball team made up of Taiwanese indigenous players. In 1929, he moved to Kyoto and attended Heian Junior High School. During his time at Heian, he played in 9 Kōshien baseball tournaments, reaching the final in 1933.

Okamura attended Nihon University.

== Playing career ==
In 1939, Okamura joined Nankai Club. Having mainly played as catcher, he was assigned to play outfielder at Nankai.
