= Sture Landqvist =

Swedish middle-distance runner

Sture Landqvist (15 January 1925 – 2 February 2016) was a Swedish middle-distance runner who competed in the 1952 Summer Olympics. He was born in Gothenburg.
