= Henri Klein (athlete) =

French middle-distance runner

Personal information
- Nationality: French
- Born: 23 September 1919 Mulhouse, France
- Died: 12 May 2007 (aged 87)

Sport
- Sport: Middle-distance running
- Event: 1500 metres

Henri Klein (23 September 1919 – 12 May 2007) was a French middle-distance runner. He competed in the men's 1500 metres at the 1948 Summer Olympics.
