= Les Hazelwood =

Australian rules footballer

Personal information
- Full name: Les Hazelwood
- Born: 9 September 1920
- Died: 21 January 1996 (aged 75)
- Height: 170 cm (5 ft 7 in)
- Weight: 73 kg (161 lb)

Playing career^{1}
| Years | Club | Games (Goals) |
| 1943–44 | South Melbourne | 9 (2) |
| 1944 | St Kilda | 1 (1) |
| Total | | 10 (3) |
- ^{1} Playing statistics correct to the end of 1944.

Les Hazelwood (9 September 1920 – 21 January 1996) was an Australian rules footballer who played with South Melbourne and St Kilda in the Victorian Football League (VFL).
