= Bob McMillen (athlete) =

American athlete (1928–2007)

Olympic medal record

Men's Athletics

Representing United States
Silver medal – second place	1952 Helsinki	1500 metres

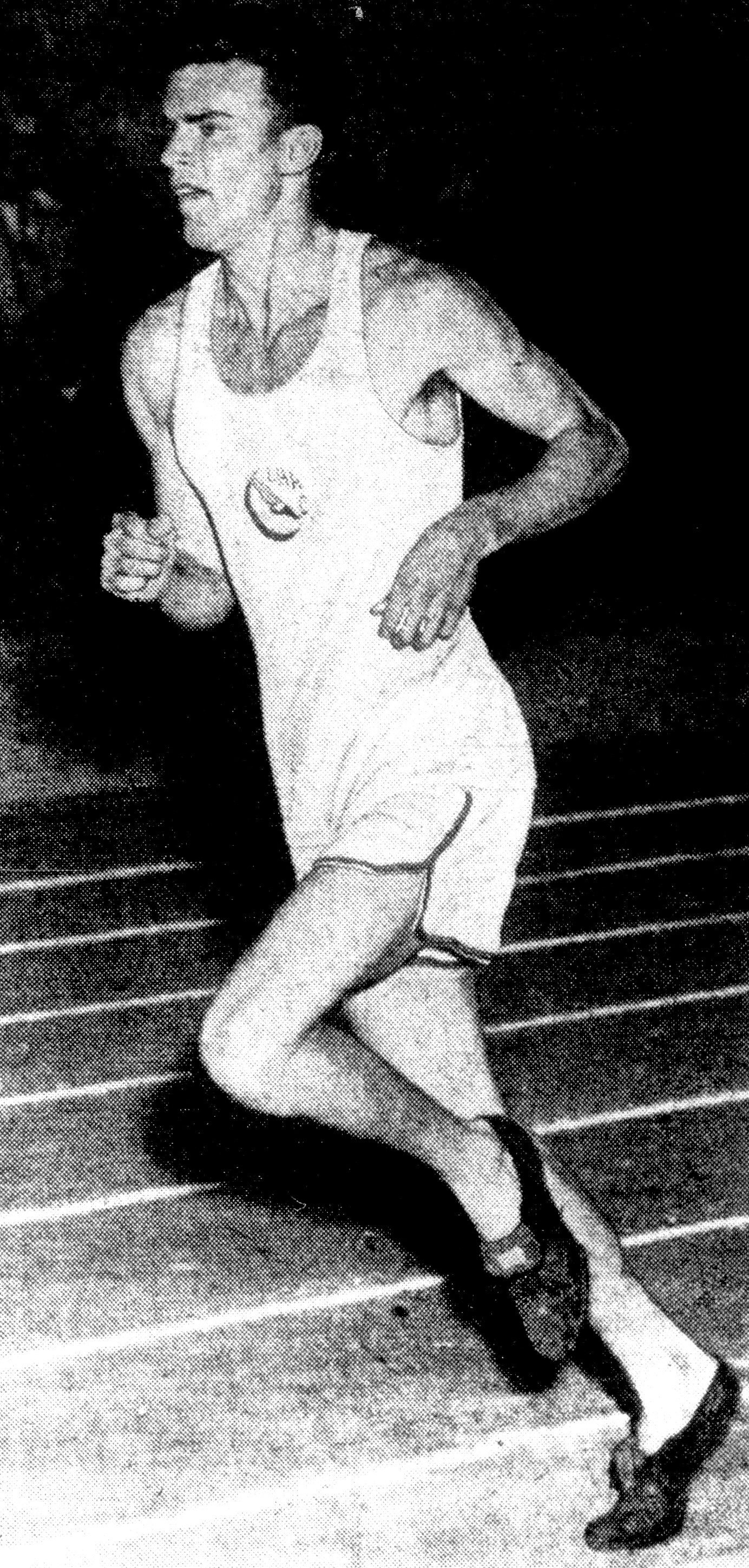
McMillen, circa 1950

Robert Earl McMillen (March 5, 1928 – April 1, 2007) was an American athlete, who competed mainly in the 1500 m.

While at Cathedral High School in Los Angeles, McMillen won the mile and set the meet record of 4:24.0 at the CIF California State Meet in 1946. In the fall of 1946, he ran for the University of Alabama under coach Tom Lieb before returning to California. He briefly worked as a carpenter, before enrolling at Glendale Community College in 1948.

While at Glendale Community College he qualified for the 1948 Summer Olympics in the Steeplechase. Then at Occidental College he won the 1952 NCAA Championship in the 1500 meters.

Born in Los Angeles, California, McMillen competed for the United States in the 1952 Summer Olympics held in Helsinki, Finland in the 1500 m, where he won the silver medal with a rush at the end. His final sprint missed catching leader Josy Barthel by a foot and a half at the line. Both athletes were given the same time, a new Olympic record.

McMillen is a 2004 inductee into the Glendale College Athletic Hall of Fame. He is also a member of the Occidental College Track and Field Hall of Fame.
