= Olavi Luoto =

Finnish middle-distance runner

Personal information
- Nationality: Finnish
- Born: 2 January 1927
- Died: 15 February 2017 (aged 90)

Sport
- Sport: Middle-distance running
- Event: 1500 metres

Olavi Luoto (2 January 1927 – 15 February 2017) was a Finnish middle-distance runner. He competed in the men's 1500 metres at the 1948 Summer Olympics.
