= Erwin Kroggel =

German fencer

Personal information
- Born: 30 April 1912 Berlin, German Empire
- Died: 2 January 1996 (aged 83) Hanover, Germany

Sport
- Sport: Fencing

Erwin Kroggel (30 April 1912 – 2 January 1996) was a German fencer. He competed in the individual épée event at the 1952 Summer Olympics.
