= Joe Wiehl =

American football player (1910–1996)

Joseph John Wiehl
Profile
- Position: Running back

Personal information
- Born: January 30, 1910; Coal Center, Pennsylvania, U.S.
- Died: January 21, 1996 (aged 85)
- Listed height: 5 ft 11 in (1.80 m)
- Listed weight: 254 lb (115 kg)

Career information
- College: Washington & Jefferson College, Duquesne University

Career history
- Pittsburgh Pirates (1935)
- Stats at Pro Football Reference

Joseph John Wiehl (January 30, 1910 – January 21, 1996) was an American professional football player for the Pittsburgh Pirates. He attended Washington & Jefferson College and Duquesne University. He attended high school in Charleroi, PA.

== Notes ==
- Career statistics from NFL.com · Pro Football Reference ·
