= Paul Lavanga =

French modern pentathlete

Personal information
- Born: 3 October 1910 Arles-sur-Tech, France
- Died: 5 January 1996 (aged 85) Perpignan, France

Sport
- Sport: Modern pentathlon

Paul Lavanga (3 October 1910 – 5 January 1996) was a French modern pentathlete. He competed at the 1936 Summer Olympics.
