= Arne Andersson =

Swedish middle-distance runner

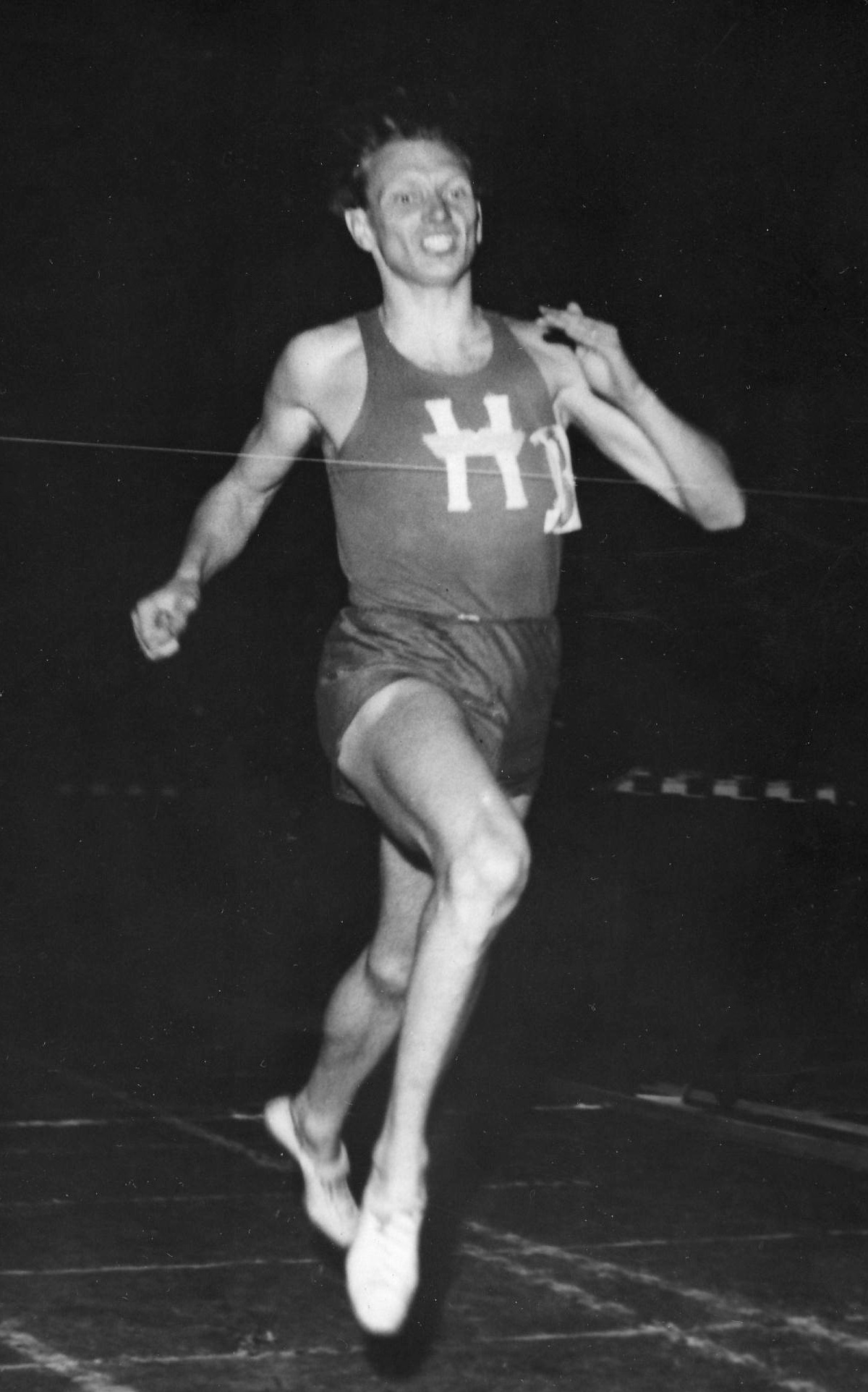
- Arne Andersson in action

Personal information
- Born: 27 October 1917 Trollhättan, Sweden
- Died: 1 April 2009 (aged 91) Vänersborg, Sweden

Sport
- Sport: Athletics
- Event: 800–5000 m
- Club: Uddevalla IS; Elfsborg; Örgryte IS; SoIK Hellas

Achievements and titles
- Personal bests: 800 m – 1:50.8 (1942); 1500 m – 3:44.0 (1944); Mile – 4:01.6 (1944); 5000 m – 14:18.2 (1941)

Arne Andersson (27 October 1917 – 1 April 2009) was a Swedish middle-distance runner who became famous for his rivalry with his compatriot Gunder Hägg in the 1940s. Andersson set a 1500 metres world record in Gothenburg in August 1943 with a time of 3:45.0 minutes. He was born in Trollhättan, Sweden.

Andersson set three world records in the mile: the first in Stockholm in July 1942 (4:06.2); this record was broken in the same year by Hägg (4:04.6). Andersson recaptured the world record in Gothenburg in July 1943 (4:02.6), and improved it further in Malmö in July 1944 (4:01.6). However, Hägg had the last word when he ran (4:01.4) in Malmö in 1945 (Hägg's record was not broken until Roger Bannister ran the first sub-4 mile in Oxford in 1954). Andersson won the Svenska Dagbladet Gold Medal in 1943.

Andersson won seven national titles: two individual (1500 m, 1943–44) and five in relays (1940–42). In 1946 he was disqualified for violating amateur rules, together with Gunder Hägg and Henry Jonsson.

Records
Preceded by (Sweden) Gunder Hägg	Men's 1500 m World Record Holder; 17 August 1943 – 7 July 1944	Succeeded by (Sweden) Gunder Hägg
Preceded by (Sweden) Gunder Hägg	Men's Mile World Record Holder; 10 July 1942 – 4 September 1942	Succeeded by (Sweden) Gunder Hägg
Preceded by (Sweden) Gunder Hägg	Men's Mile World Record Holder; 1 July 1943 – 17 July 1945	Succeeded by (Sweden) Gunder Hägg
Preceded by Gunder Hägg	Svenska Dagbladet Gold Medal; 1943	Succeeded by Nils Karlsson
Preceded by (Sweden) Gunder Hägg	European Record Holder Men's 1500 m 17 August 1943 – 16 July 1944	Succeeded by (Sweden) Gunder Hägg
