= Patrick El Mabrouk =

French middle-distance runner

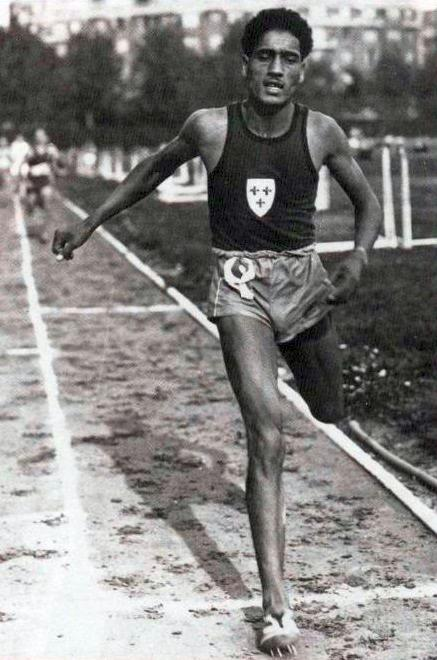
- Patrick El Mabrouk during the second half of the 1940s

Medal record

Men's athletics

Representing France

European Championships
Silver medal – second place	1950 Brussels	1500 m

Muhammad "Patrick" El Mabrouk (30 October 1928 – 3 February 1994) was a middle distance runner who competed in the 1952 Summer Olympics for France.

In the archives, he is known to have been born in a town by the name of Tagla, but the towns precise location in North Africa remains unknown. The most likely candidate is the village of Ain Tagla in the Moroccan province of Azilal, as the villages residents had historically served in the Algerian military as well.
