= Lennart Strand =

Swedish middle-distance runner

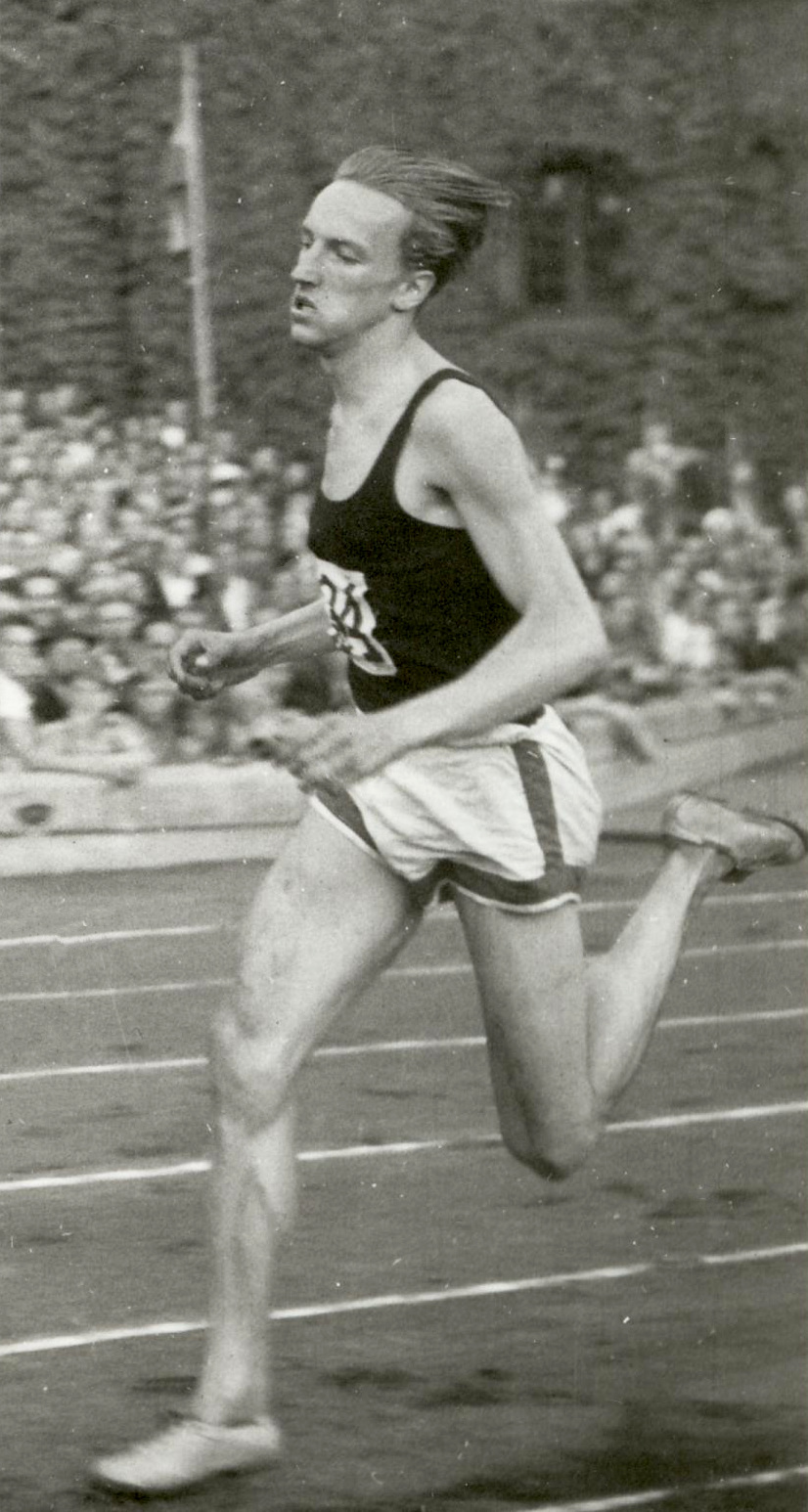
- Lennart Strand at the Swedish National Championships in Stockholm, Sweden in July 1947

Personal information
- Born: June 13, 1921 Malmö, Sweden
- Died: January 23, 2004 (aged 82) Malmö, Sweden
- Height: 1.73 m (5 ft 8 in)
- Weight: 61 kg (134 lb)

Sport
- Sport: Athletics
- Event(s): 800 m, 1500 m
- Club: MAI Malmö

Achievements and titles
- Personal best(s): 800 m – 1:51.8 (1949); 1500 m – 3:43.0 (1947)
Medal record
Men's athletics
Representing Sweden
Olympic Games
Silver medal – second place	1948 London	1500 m
European Championships
Gold medal – first place	1946 Oslo	1500 m

Lennart Strand (13 June 1921 – 23 January 2004) was a Swedish middle-distance runner who specialized in the 1500 m. In this event, he won the national title in 1945–47, 1949 and 1950 and the European title in 1946, beating his compatriot Henry Eriksson. Two years later he finished second behind Eriksson at the 1948 Summer Olympics. In 1947, Strand equaled Gunder Hägg's 1500 m world record of 3:43.0 in Malmö.

Strand retired from competitions in 1950, after abandoning the 1500 m final race at the European Championships. He then became an accomplished piano player, and released several jazz albums in 1952. He also worked as a sportswriter for the Sydsvenska Dagbladet newspaper. Strand died in 2004 due to injuries sustained in a traffic accident in late 2003.

Records
Preceded by (Sweden) Gunder Hägg	European Record Holder Men's 1500m 15 July 1947 – 28 June 1952	Succeeded by (Germany) Werner Lueg
