= Peter Shenton =

English cricketer (1936–1996)

Peter Anthony Shenton (5 May 1936 – 13 January 1996) was an English cricketer who played in first-class cricket matches for Northamptonshire and for Kent County Cricket Clubs.

Shenton was born in Redcar in Yorkshire in 1936. After first appearing for Northamptonshire's Second XI in 1957, he played Minor Counties Championship and Second Eleven Championship cricket regularly for the team in 1958 and 1959. He made only one appearance for Northants' First XI, making his first-class cricket debut against Glamorgan in May 1958.

After moving to play for Kent in 1960, Shenton made a further seven first-class appearances, all during the 1960 season, including playing in a match at Tunbridge Wells against Worcestershire which was completed in a single day. He played Second XI cricket throughout 1960 and 1961 and went on to play as a professional for several clubs throughout Yorkshire.

Shenton was primarily an off-spin bowler who took 17 first-class wickets in his career, with best figures of five wickets for 68 runs, his only first-class five-wicket haul. He died at Middlesbrough in 1996 aged 59.
