= Pritam Singh (gymnast) =

Indian gymnast (1924–1996)

- Born: 17 October 1924 Garhshankar, British India
- Died: 8 January 1996 (aged 71)

Gymnastics career
- Discipline: Men's artistic gymnastics
- Country represented: India

Pritam Singh (17 October 1924 – 8 January 1996) was an Indian gymnast. He competed in seven events at the 1956 Summer Olympics. Singh died on 8 January 1996, at the age of 71.
