= Lindsey Jerman =

English cricketer

Personal information
- Full name: Lindsey Crawford Stapleton Jerman
- Born: 23 April 1915; Old Fletton, Huntingdonshire, England
- Died: 15 January 1996 (aged 80); Chelmsford, Essex, England
- Batting: Right-handed
- Role: Bowler

Domestic team information
- Years: Team
- 1950–1951: Essex

Career statistics
Competition	FC
Matches	3
Runs scored	8
Batting average	4.00
100s/50s	0/0
Top score	8
Balls bowled	492
Wickets	1
Bowling average	222.00
5 wickets in innings	0
10 wickets in match	0
Best bowling	1/39
Catches/stumpings	2/0
- Source: Cricinfo, 19 July 2013

Lindsey Jerman (23 April 1915 – 15 January 1996) was an English cricketer. He played for Essex between 1950 and 1951.
