= Frans Herman =

Belgian middle-distance runner

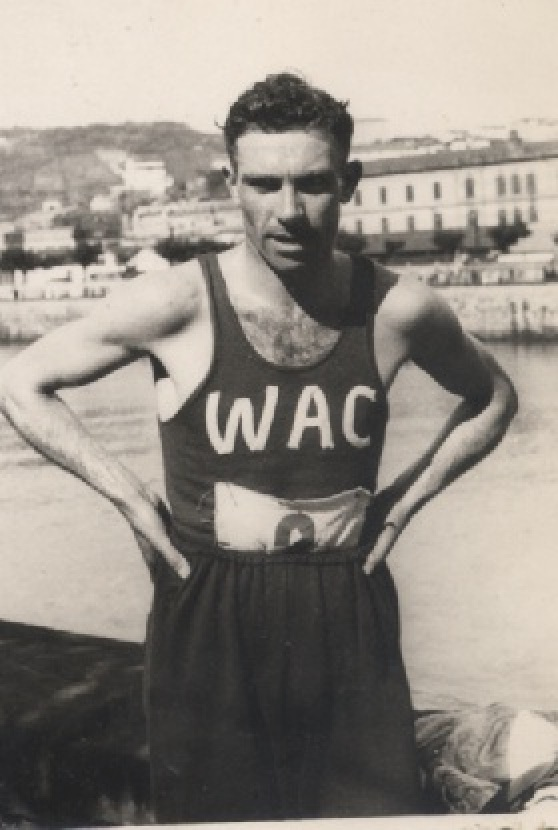

Personal information
- Nationality: Belgian
- Born: 6 February 1927
- Died: 21 September 1990 (aged 63)

Sport
- Sport: Middle-distance running
- Event: 1500 metres

Frans Herman (6 February 1927 – 21 September 1990) was a Belgian middle-distance runner. He competed in the men's 1500 metres at the 1952 Summer Olympics.

His grandson is javelin thrower Timothy Herman.
