= Józef Wiśniewski =

Polish ice hockey player

- Born: 1 November 1940 Sławkowo, Occupied Poland
- Died: 9 January 1996 (aged 55) Toruń, Poland
- Height: 5 ft 6 in (168 cm)
- Weight: 170 lb (77 kg; 12 st 2 lb)
- Position: Goaltender
- Played for: TKH Toruń
- National team: Poland
- Playing career: 1960–1972

Józef Wiśniewski (1 November 1940 – 9 January 1996), was a Polish former ice hockey goaltender. He played for TKH Toruń and was a member of the Polish national team at the 1964 Winter Olympics.
