= Jean Peitevin de Saint André =

French equestrian

Personal information
- Nationality: French
- Born: 18 June 1912; Toulouse, France
- Died: 30 January 1996 (aged 83); Paris, France

Sport
- Sport: Equestrian

Jean Peitevin de Saint André (18 June 1912 – 30 January 1996) was a French equestrian. He competed in two events at the 1952 Summer Olympics.
