= Gunder Hägg =

Swedish runner (1918–2004)

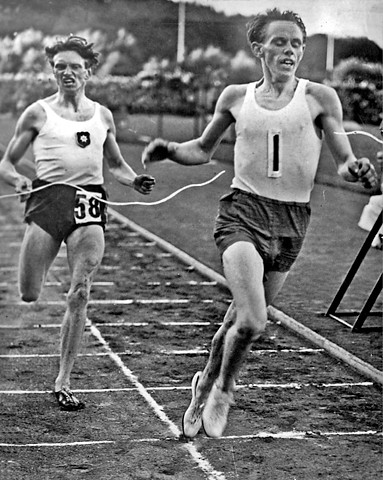
- Hägg (right) sets a new world record for the mile at 4.06.2 in Gothenburg on 1 July 1942. Behind him is Arne Andersson.

Personal information
- Born: 31 December 1918 Albacken, Sweden
- Died: 27 November 2004 (aged 85) Malmö, Sweden

Sport
- Sport: Athletics
- Events: 800–5000 m, steeplechase
- Club: Albackens IF; Kälarne IK; Gefle IF; MAI

Achievements and titles
- Personal bests: 800 m – 1:52.8 (1942); 1500 m – 3:43.0 (1944); Mile – 4:01.4 (1945); 3000 m – 8:01.2 (1942); 5000 m – 13:58.2 (1942)

Gunder Hägg (31 December 1918 – 27 November 2004) was a Swedish runner and multiple world record breaker of the 1940s. He set over a dozen middle distance world records at events ranging from 1500 to 5000 meters, including three at both the 1500 meters and the mile, one at 3000 meters and one at 5000 meters.

Hägg and fellow Swede, Arne Andersson, lowered the record for the mile to just over four minutes (4:01.4) – accelerating the progression of the world record in the mile run. Both athletes set three world records for the mile. Hägg first set the record in July 1942 at 4:06.2, a time which was equalled by Andersson later the same month. This record was broken by Hägg (4:04.6) in September the same year. Andersson recaptured the world record in July 1943 (4:02.6), and improved it further in July 1944 (4:01.6). However, Hägg then managed a time of 4:01.4 in Malmö in July 1945. Hägg's record was not broken until Roger Bannister ran the first sub-4 mile in Oxford in May 1954.

Hägg was also the first man to run a sub-14 minute 5,000 metres, a feat he achieved in September 1942. This record stood for over eleven years. The next world record for the men's 5,000 metres to stand for this long was set in May 2004 by Kenenisa Bekele of Ethiopia. His record stood for over sixteen years.

In 1946, Gunder Hägg was branded a professional because he received payments for running. He was therefore barred from competition, together with Arne Andersson and Henry Jonsson. Four years earlier, he earned the Svenska Dagbladet Gold Medal.

Records
Preceded by (New Zealand) Jack Lovelock (Sweden) Arne Andersson	Men's 1500 m World Record Holder; 10 August 1941 – 17 August 1943; 7 July 1944 – 29 June 1952	Succeeded by (Sweden) Arne Andersson (West Germany) Werner Lueg
Preceded by (United Kingdom) Sydney Wooderson (Sweden) Arne Andersson (Sweden) Arne Andersson	Men's Mile World Record Holder; 1 July 1942 – 10 July 1942; 4 September 1942 – 1 July 1943; 17 July 1945 – 6 May 1954	Succeeded by (Sweden) Arne Andersson (Sweden) Arne Andersson (United Kingdom) Roger Bannister
Preceded by (Sweden) Henry Kälarne	Men's 3000 m World Record Holder; 28 August 1942 – 12 August 1949	Succeeded by (Belgium) Gaston Reiff
Preceded by (Finland) Taisto Mäki	Men's Two Miles World Record Holder; 3 June 1942 – 26 August 1952	Succeeded by (Belgium) Gaston Reiff
Preceded by (Finland) Taisto Mäki	Men's 5000 m World Record Holder; 20 September 1942 – 30 May 1954	Succeeded by (Czechoslovakia) Emil Zátopek
Preceded by (Hungary) Miklós Szabó (Sweden) Arne Andersson	European Record Holder Men's 1500 m 10 August 1941 – 16 August 1943; 17 July 1944 – 14 July 1947	Succeeded by (Sweden) Arne Andersson (Sweden) Lennart Strand
Awards
Preceded by (Sweden) Alfred Dahlqvist	Svenska Dagbladet Gold Medal; 1942	Succeeded by (Sweden) Arne Andersson
