= Aulis Pystynen =

Finnish middle-distance runner

Personal information
- Nationality: Finnish
- Born: 3 January 1928 Espoo, Finland
- Died: 6 January 1996 (aged 68) Helsinki, Finland

Sport
- Sport: Middle-distance running
- Event: 1500 metres

Aulis Pystynen (3 January 1928 – 6 January 1996) was a Finnish middle-distance runner. He competed in the men's 1500 metres at the 1952 Summer Olympics.
