= Denis Johansson =

Finnish middle-distance runner (1928–1991)

Personal information
- Nationality: Finnish
- Born: 8 April 1928
- Died: 17 January 1991 (aged 62)

Sport
- Sport: Middle-distance running
- Event: 1500 metres

Denis Johansson (8 April 1928 – 17 January 1991) was a Finnish middle-distance runner. He competed in the 1500 metres at the 1948 Summer Olympics and the 1952 Summer Olympics.
