= Doug Wilson (athlete) =

British athlete

Personal information
- Nationality: British (English)
- Born: 28 January 1920 Islington, London, England
- Died: 18 October 2010 (aged 90) Winchester, England
- Height: 180 cm (5 ft 11 in)
- Weight: 69 kg (152 lb)

Sport
- Sport: Athletics
- Event: middle-distance
- Club: Polytechnic Harriers

Douglas Gordon Wilson (28 January 1920 – 18 October 2010) was a British athlete who competed at the 1948 Summer Olympics.

== Biography ==
Wilson was born in Islington and was a member of the Polytechnic Harriers of London. His career was interrupted by World War II. In 1946, Wilson broke the English record for the 1.5 mile event and became the British 1 mile champion after winning the British AAA Championships title at the 1946 AAA Championships. Wilson represented the Great Britain team in the men's 1500m event at the 1948 Olympic Games in London, but was eliminated in the opening round, placing fifth in his heat.

After retiring from athletics he worked as a journalist for News of the World and later became the press officer for the Sports Aid Foundation. In 1993 he became editor of The Olympian magazine. In 2008 he was interviewed by the BBC on the subject of the 2012 Summer Olympics that are to be held in London, where he suggested that the organising committee "should go back to basics, the simplicity of the games". He died in Winchester, Hampshire, England in October 2010.
