= Vasilios Mavroidis =

Greek middle-distance runner

Personal information
- Nationality: Greek
- Born: 26 November 1926
- Died: 2002 (aged 75–76)

Sport
- Sport: Middle-distance running
- Event(s): 400m, 800m, 1500m

Vasilios Mavroidis (15 November 1926 – 2002) was a Greek athlete. He competed in both the 800 metres and the 1500 metres at the 1948 Summer Olympics and the 1952 Summer Olympics.
