= Hans Harting =

Dutch middle-distance runner

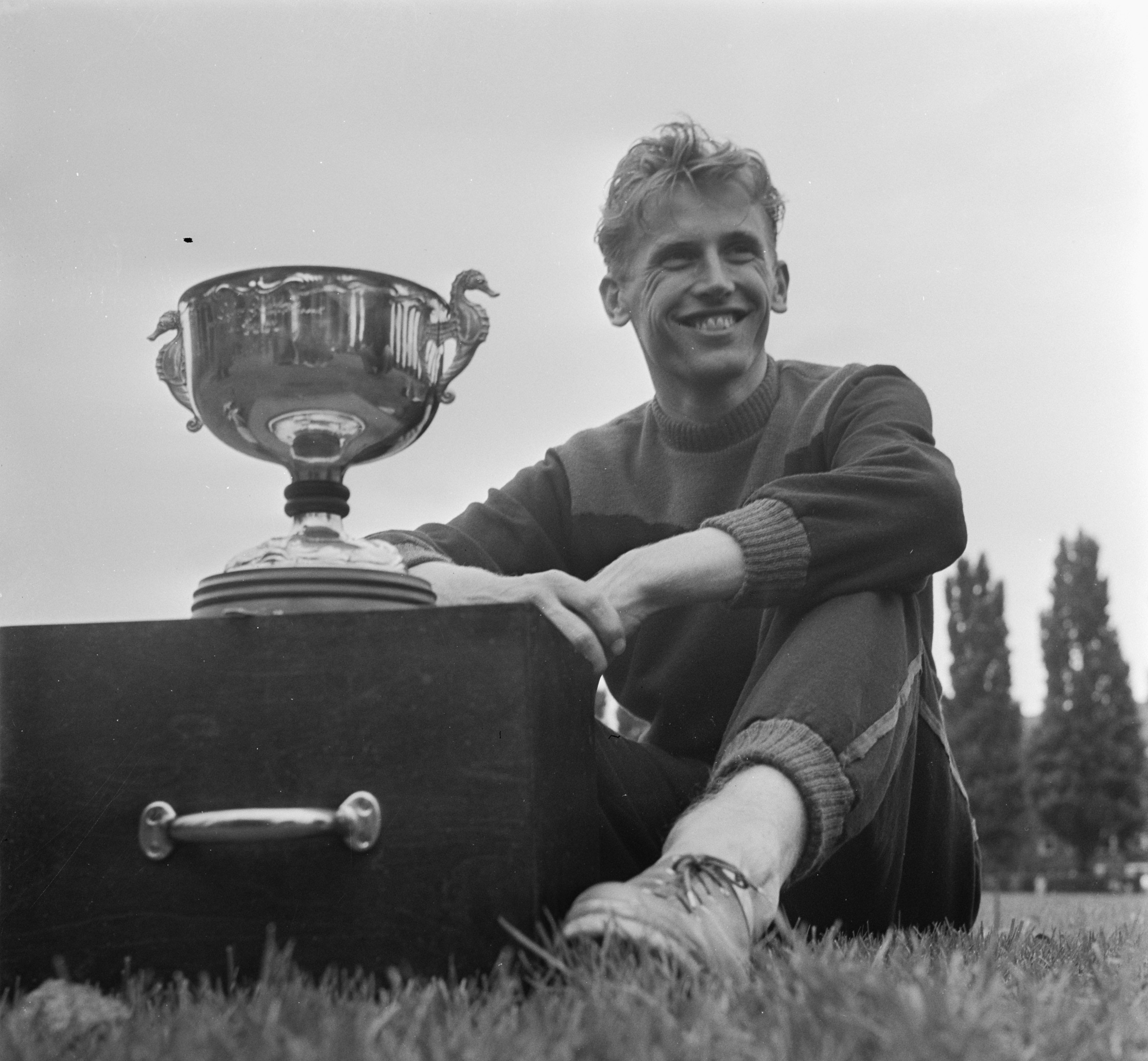
- Hans Harting in 1951

Personal information
- Born: 2 February 1926 Borbeck, Germany
- Died: 8 July 2004 (aged 78) Amsterdam, the Netherlands

Sport
- Sport: Running
- Club: AAC, Amsterdam

Hans Harting (2 February 1926 – 8 July 2004) was a Dutch middle-distance runner who competed in the 1500 m event at the 1952 Summer Olympics. His personal best record was 3 mins 51.2 seconds.
