= Sándor Garay =

Hungarian middle-distance runner

Personal information
- Nationality: Hungarian
- Born: 4 February 1920 Budapest, Hungary
- Died: 7 February 2006 (aged 86) Budapest, Hungary
- Height: 168 cm (5 ft 6 in)
- Weight: 54 kg (119 lb)

Sport
- Sport: Middle-distance running
- Event: 1500 metres
- Club: Vasas Budapest

Sándor Garay (4 February 1920 – 7 February 2006) was a Hungarian middle-distance runner. He competed in the 1500 metres at the 1948 Summer Olympics and the 1952 Summer Olympics.

Garay won the British AAA Championships title in the 1 mile event at the 1947 AAA Championships.
