= Václav Čevona =

Slovak middle-distance runner

Personal information
- Nationality: Slovak
- Born: 24 May 1922 Ružomberok, Czechoslovakia
- Died: 9 January 2008 (aged 85) Ústí nad Orlicí, Czech Republic

Sport
- Sport: Middle-distance running
- Event: 1500 metres

Václav Čevona (24 May 1922 – 9 January 2008) was a Slovak middle-distance runner. He competed in the 1500 metres at the 1948 Summer Olympics and the 1952 Summer Olympics.
