= Ephraimite =

Ephraimite may refer to:

- a member of the Tribe of Ephraim
- Ephraimite (coin), debased coinage issued by Frederick the Great
