= Johann Philipp Graumann =

German business mathematician

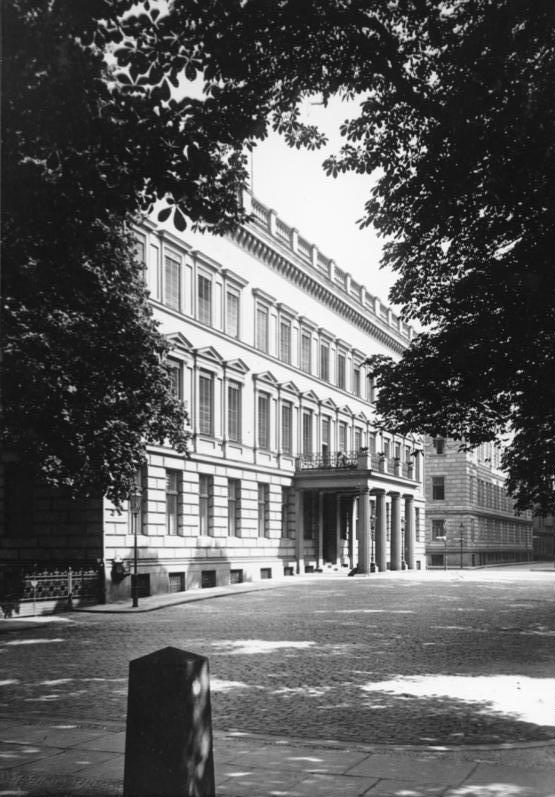
In the 18th century half of the Palais am Festungsgraben was occupied by J.P. Graumann; Prussian Ministry of Finance in the 1930s.

Johann Philipp Graumann (born in 1706 – died 22 April 1762 in Berlin) was a German business mathematician, an expert on exchange rates and coinage, mint master in Braunschweig-Wolfenbüttel and Berlin, a mercantilist, and Prussian financial advisor. He is considered one of the most important German monetary theorists of his time. As master of the mints in Prussia, he implemented a major coin reform, with the goal of implementing a new monetary standard to promote trade, increase seigniorage income and elevate the Prussian coins to the status of a reserve currency. Graumann was portrayed by his contemporaries as a dreamer. With only a slight modification, his coin standard remained in place in Germany until 1907.

== Life ==
Not much is known about Graumann's early life, but for many years his father was in the service of Augustus William, Duke of Brunswick-Lüneburg as Graumann states in his second publication dedicated to his brother Louis Rudolph, Duke of Brunswick-Lüneburg. Obviously, Graumann visited a gymnasium. At the beginning of his career, he was specializing in the arbitrage of exchange. Graumann was influenced by Christlieb von Clausberg, after Clausberg published his book Demonstrative Rechenkunst, Oder Wissenschaft, gründlich und kurz zu rechnen. Graumann claimed to be the inventor of the commercial chain rule, which he was not. Graumann lived in Hamburg (1730-1734) and in Amsterdam (1737-1740) and worked for the main Amsterdam merchant houses. According to Willem Kersseboom, a financial expert, he came from Electorate of Hanover and arrived in Amsterdam around 1720, which is hard to prove. He dedicated his fifth book to the Amsterdam burgomaster Daniel Hooft.

On 26 January 1742, he was appointed by Charles I, Duke of Brunswick-Wolfenbüttel as Münzmeister. In Braunschweig, his task was to increase the income of the Treasury and the volume of trade. Graumann was assisted in his task by Martin Kröncke. During the Austrian War of Succession, a shortage of small coins existed all over Europe. In 1747, Graumann introduced a debased Albertustaler; he wanted to compete with the Dutch who used the Albertustaler to pay in the Baltic countries. In 1748/1749, he lived in Spain, working on his next book. In 1749, he published his groundbreaking Abdruck eines Schreibens, die Teutsche und anderer Völker Münzverfassung, insonderheit die hochfürstliche Braunschweigische Münze zu den Annehmlichkeiten betreffend, in which he described a plan to reform the mint and abandon the prevailing 1/12 Leipzig standard for silver coins (= 12 thalers per Cologne fine mark). The book brought the activities of the Brunswick mint officials to the attention of the Prussian King Frederick II. His ideas about gold, which was 4% overvalued, were accepted by the government in Brunswick and by Frederick, but not by Julius Melchior Strube, who wrote a reply for the government in Churhannover, c.q. George II of Great Britain.

=== Graumann currency reform ===
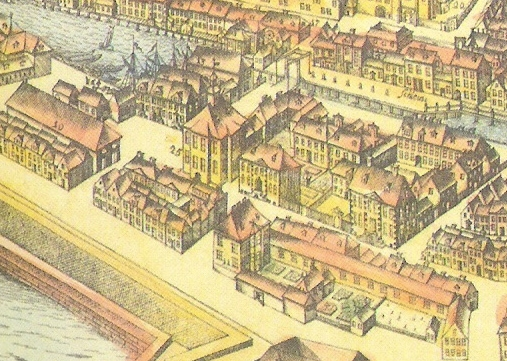
In the middle the Friedrichswerder city counsel (nr. 25) can be seen. To the north along the Spreekanal and the Unterwasserstrasse, was the old mint. Detail Berliner Stadtansicht von Schultz, 1688.

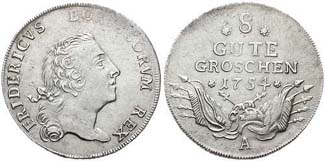
8 Gute Groschen (⅓ Reichstaler) von 1754, Münzzeichen: A, Münzstätte Berlin

Until 1750, the Prussian minting industry was composed of semi-private enterprises run by mintmasters. Thereafter, mint directors in the service of the crown took over the management of Prussian mints. In 1750, Prussia had two, even three coin standards, which was very disturbing for the administration and especially for the payment of the silver deliveries.

On 23 January 1750, Graumann was appointed as Frederick's confidential adviser on finance, military affairs, and royal possessions, as well as the Director-General of all mint facilities in Berlin, Breslau, Kleve, Aurich, Königsberg, Magdeburg and Stettin. Graumann had two main tasks: first, he was to secure the availability of coin silver for the Prussian monetary system; second, he was to eliminate the currency chaos of the Austrian War of Succession and rationalize the Prussian coinage. Prussia adopted a Prussian thaler containing 1/14 of a Cologne mark of silver, rather than 1/12 (as under the Leipzig standard), probably in the expectation that this realistic coin foot would prevail throughout the empire. This new standard was referred to as the Graumann coin standard. Graumann announced that he would be able to achieve high coin seignorage for the state and that Berlin would become the largest exchange center in Central and Northern Europe, taking away the banking and minting profits that were then accruing to the Dutch. In 1750, silver - for half a million thalers - was purchased in London, Amsterdam, and Frankfurt am Main for the mint facility of Berlin. By April 1751 there was enough new money for it to function as a circulating medium. The metal content of the new “Reichsthalers" was equal or close to their face value. All contracts, bonds and bills of exchange were to be made out only in new [Prussian] money, otherwise they were legally unenforceable. At the end of May 1751, the "Generalkassen", customs and post offices were ordered to make the payments as far as possible in new money.

All Graumann's efforts were devoted to the goal of keeping the market value of the Prussian coins high and reducing the market value of foreign coin types. Prussia decided to produce a lot of small change, which meant that their large silver coins (Kurantmünzen) were melted and exported to places where the silver had higher value. Prussia made this situation worse by overvaluing gold coins relative to silver. Graumann was envious of the Dutch, whose coinage circulated as much as 8 percent above its domestic value in various places in the Baltic. He wanted Prussia to be able to do the same.

In 1752, a new mint facility was built in the Münzstrasse (Spandauer Vorstadt), and Graumann increased the mint personnel tenfold, but he lacked silver to make this operation profitable. On 2 September, he arranged silver a contract with Veitel Heine Ephraim. In 1753, he introduced the nominal "Achtgutegroschen", which was cheaper by its 3% lowered "Münzfuß" in the production. Dissatisfied with Graumann's performance, Frederick decided to negotiate the silver supply contracts himself. In 1753 Graumann proposed a central bank, combining an exchange bank, a lending bank, and a note-issuing bank into one institution as a way of attracting additional silver to Prussia. This proposal ran into strong opposition from local, Breslau and Hamburg merchant-bankers and was not implemented. Because the profits of the mint facilities did not meet Frederick's goals, Graumann was dismissed early 1755, and not allowed to disseminate his knowledge. The mess created with massive amounts of coins (Scheidemünzen) was obvious; exchanging coins became an art.

== Later life ==
After Graumann's fall, the lease of the Prussian mint at Königsberg was transferred to Moses Fränkel and Veitel Heine Ephraim. Their success in Königsberg was so great that under similar conditions they were given the lease of the mints of Aurich and Cleves. Moses Gumpertz, Moses Isaak and Daniel Itzig leased the mint in Berlin.

At the beginning of the Seven Years' War, the king's need for revenue rose sharply. Saxony was invaded by Prussia not least because of its wealthy silver mines near Freiberg. As the war continued Frederick agreed to reductions in the precious metal content of his coins in order to get as high a coinage as possible. In 1756 Ephraim became operator of the Leipzig mint facility; in 1757 also in Dresden and in 1758 of all the mint facilities in Saxony and Prussia together with Itzig. The Graumann coin standard was abandoned in 1758 in Saxony; at 1 January 1759 in Prussia. In April 1759, Graumann discussed with Ephraim the old and Mittelfriedrich d'or and the agio. Ephraim and Itzig produced millions of debased coins known as Ephraimiten. In Poland, no no coins were minted throughout the 18th century and consequently, it became an ideal dumping ground for the devalued coins. Frederick's debased coins were an inspiration to many other German principalities, who inflated their currencies as well. Rival mints in Harzgerode (1760) in Anhalt-Bernburg, Quedlinburg in Sachsen-Anhalt (1761), Schwerin in Mecklenburg-Schwerin (1761), Neustrelitz in Mecklenburg-Strelitz, (1762) and Rethwisch in the Duchy of Holstein (1762) were forcibly closed or acquired by Prussia, c.q. by Ephraim as undesired competition.

By 1760, the price of silver that had to be bought from the Wisselbank in Amsterdam rose from 19 to 28 and 34 Reichsthaler per Mark. From November 1761 most foreign "Kriegsgeld" was no longer accepted in Prussia and Saxony, only if it was melted. An exception was made for the coins minted in Anhalt-Bernburg, which were used to buy silver in Amsterdam and Hamburg.

In April 1762, the 56-year old Graumann died of a digestion disease. He was buried in Petrikirche (Berlin-Cölln). His widow was Johanna Christina Hersin from Hessen, whom he had married in May 1750.

== Legacy ==
Frederick never shied away from responsibility for Prussian inflation, which many historians have characterized as a form of state-sponsored counterfeiting. He saw it as the only means of procuring the cash needed for warfare without imposing too heavy a tax burden on his subjects. How many coins were actually minted and what the total income from this inflation was, is unknown. Documents exist only for the mint in Dresden from February 1758 to May 1759. According to Jan Greitens "Graumann and Justi were trapped in the situation of a divided Germany, in which many states had the right of coinage and devalued the coins to generate income."

After his dismissal by Frederick Graumann lived for the rest of his life in Palais am Festungsgraben (until World War II, the headquarters of the Prussian Finance Ministry). Some of his books were translated into French. Graumann corresponded with the Scottish mercantilist James Steuart (economist) and produced a number of essays on the relationship between gold and silver.

Graumann "Gesammelte Briefe" contains the best contemporary discussion of the coinage situation. Before the Seven Years' War silver was cheaper and gold more expensive in Germany than anywhere else, according to Graumann. He seemed to believe that if Prussia only minted as many coins as the Dutch Republic, then Prussia could also circulate coins at such a high value. He is very precise in his descriptions but is lacking in some modern economic concepts. In Graumann's view there were two successful coin "exporters": France and the Dutch Republic. France because it was a large country and prohibited all foreign coin. The Netherlands because everyone traded coins and bills there, in part because of the system of receipts at the Wisselbank, but in part just because everyone agreed that Amsterdam was the place for such business. "In the long run, Graumann's export of money without the export of goods was inadequate to control the rate of exchange."

On 1 December 1763 Graumann's successor became Martin Kröncke, former mintmaster in Breslau. The Graumann coin standard was reintroduced and widespread in all of northern and central Germany. Frederick II signed the ruling on March 29, 1764, which came into force on 1 June. Graumann's ideas formed the basis for the introduction of a uniform German coinage system in the 19th century.

== Works ==
- Abdruck von einem Schreiben, die Deutsche und anderer Völcker Münz-Verfassung und insonderheit die Hoch-Fürstl, Braunschweigische Münze betreffend (Reprint of a letter, the German and Other Peoples Coin Constitution and in particular the High Prince, concerning the Brunswick Mint), 1749 (in German)
- Herrn Johann Philip Graumanns Gesammlete Briefe (Johann Philip Graumann's Collected Letters), 1762 (in German), ISBN 978-0-266-64648-8

== Sources ==
- Friedrich von Schrötter: Das Preußische Münzwesen im 18. Jahrhundert. Parey, Berlin 1908. (Archive)
- Studies in the Economic Policy of Frederick the Great by W.O. Henderson, p. 40
- Die Graumann’sche Münzreform (1750-1755)
- "Graumann, Johann Philipp" by Karl Theodor von Inama-Stargg in Allgemeine Deutsche Biographie, Volume 9 (1879), pp. 605–606
- Denkwürdigkeiten aus dem Leben ausgezeichneter Teutschen des achtzehnten Jahrhunderts (1802) von Christian Gotthilf Salzmann
- A Manual of Gold and Silver Coins of All Nations Struck Within the Past ... by Jacob Eckfeldt
- Hans-Jürgen Gerhard (2009) "Ein Adler fängt keine Mücken!" Eine Währungsreform mit Weitblick und Langzeitwirkung. Johann Philip Grauman als Gernaralmünzdirektor Friedrichs des Großen. In: Wirtschafstlenkende Montanverwaltung - Fürstlicher Unternehmer - Merkantilismus. Matthiesen Verlag 2009
