= Gothic Cathedral by a River =

Painting by Karl Friedrich Schinkel

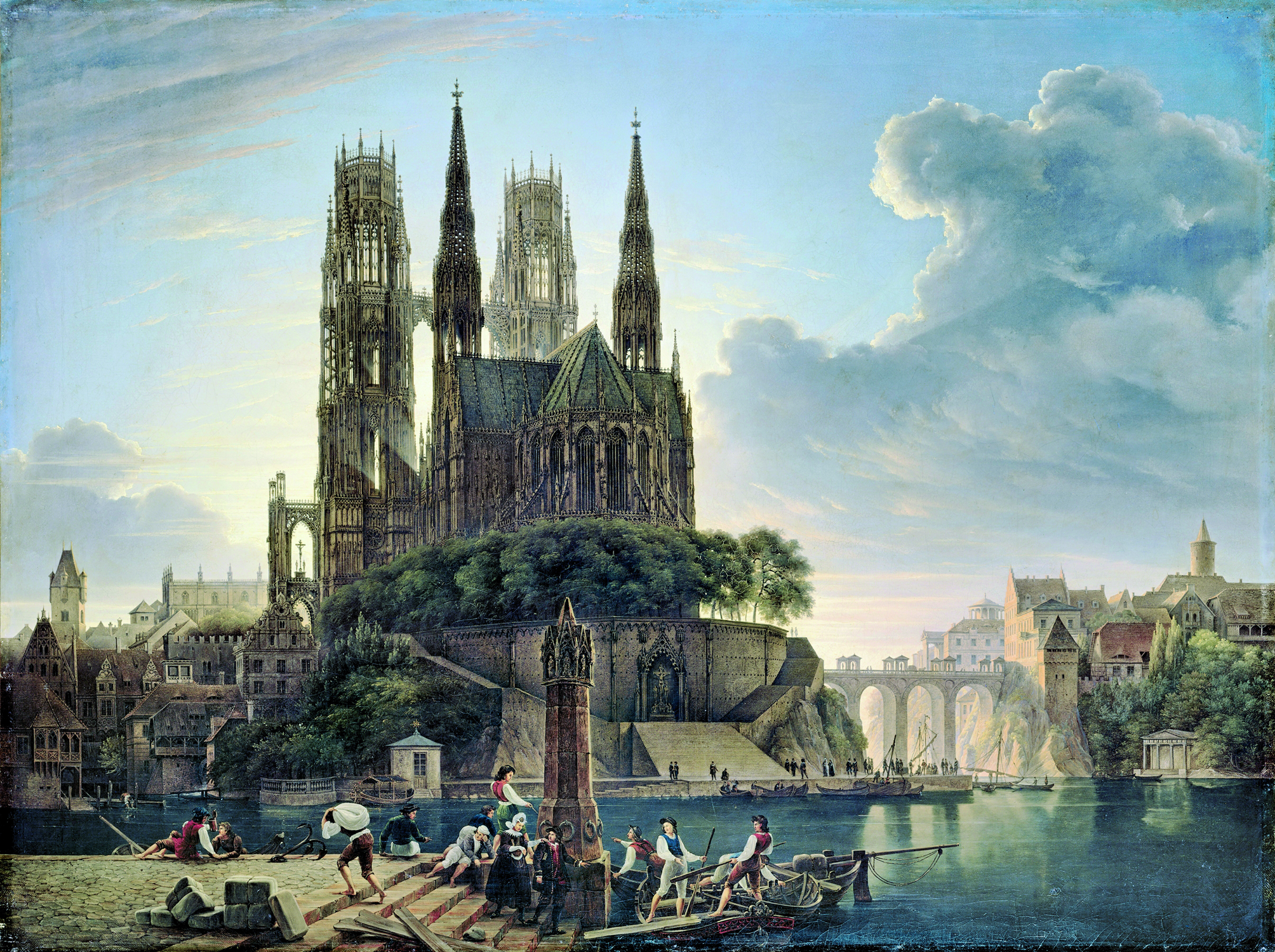
- Artist: Karl Friedrich Schinkel
- Year: 1813
- Medium: oil on canvas
- Dimensions: 80 cm × 106.5 cm (31 in × 41.9 in)
- Location: Alte Nationalgalerie, Berlin

Gothic Cathedral by a River (German - Gotischer Dom am Wasser) is an 1813 painting by German artist and architect Karl Friedrich Schinkel. It shows an imaginary Gothic cathedral on an island in a river - Schinkel later became a noted proponent of Neo-Gothic architecture. It is held in the Alte Nationalgalerie, in Berlin.

Painted in the late afternoon, the sun setting behind the cathedral shines through the intricate tracery of the towers, illuminating their fine detail, such as the spiral staircase and the connecting bridge.

The painting is notable by virtue of the number of replica and derivative works produced, the authorship of which are a matter of debate. On Schinkels's death in 1841 three replica versions existed, one of which was lost in the Munich Glaspalast fire in 1931, another of which is in St Petersburg and the third of which is in the Berlin Altegalerie (see right). Variant works based on Shinkel's original can be found in the Neue Pinakothek, in Munich (by Karl Eduard Biermann), and in private hands (by Johann Theodor Goldstein, 1822).

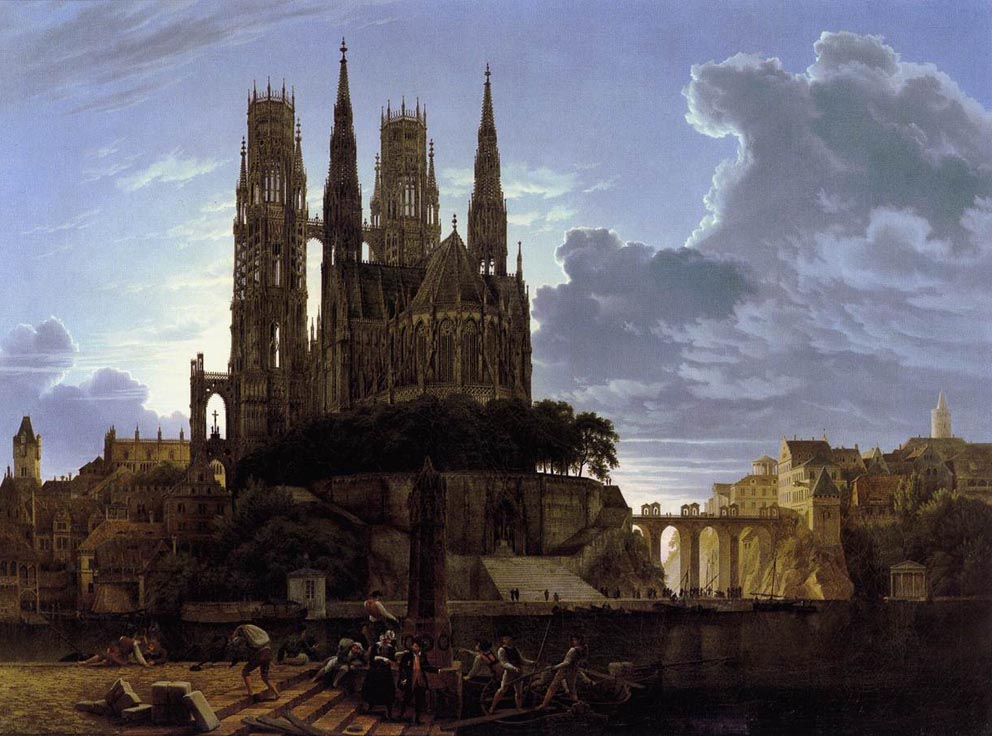
Replica by Karl Eduard Biermann, c.1830, Neue Pinakothek, Munich
