= Palais am Festungsgraben =

Building in Berlin, Germany

Coordinates: 52°31′8″N 13°23′44″E

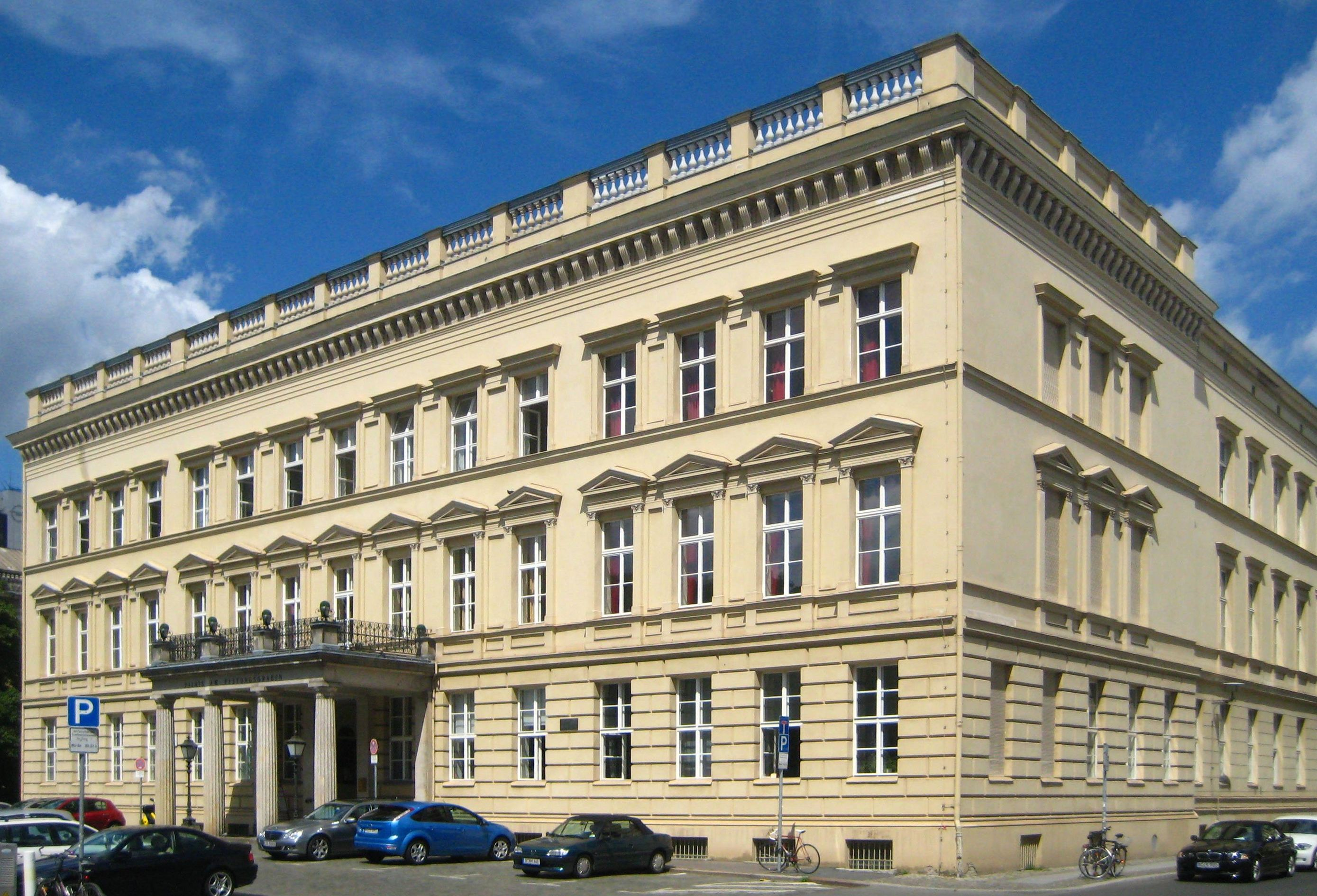
The Palais am Festungsgraben (2009)

The Palais am Festungsgraben ("Palace on the Moat"), originally known as the Palais Donner, is a stately building in Berlin's Mitte subdistrict located behind, and facing, the ensemble of chestnut trees around the Neue Wache ("New Guardhause"), near the eastern terminus of the boulevard Unter den Linden. The name refers to its construction next to a redundant canal, gradually filled in by 1883, which had originally been a moat surrounding the 17th century city wall. Built as a private residence, it later housed a succession of Prussian government offices, and after World War II various cultural institutions in the Soviet sector of Berlin. After administrative authority was transferred to the newly established German Democratic Republic (GDR) in 1949 it hosted a succession of institutions established to further German-Russian contacts. Since German reunification it has accommodated a theater (Theater im Palais) and from 2004 an art gallery (Saarländische Galerie – Europäisches Kunstforum e.V.).

== History ==
By royal order King Friedrich II of Prussia presented the plot to his valet, Johann Gottfried Donner, on 7 November 1751. Donner had the palace constructed from 1751 to 1753 following plans by the court architect Friedrich Feldmann. Donner and his family lived on the ground floor of the palace and on the first upper storey (bel étage) Donner installed a large, elegant hall for public festivities as well as a private residence, which was rented to the administrator of the Prussian mint, Johann Philipp Graumann. The attic was used to store and air bulk grain, and at the back of the lot Donner laid out a garden with an underground cold storage room (Eiskeller) and a carriage house, using the remaining space to run a flourishing trade in timber.

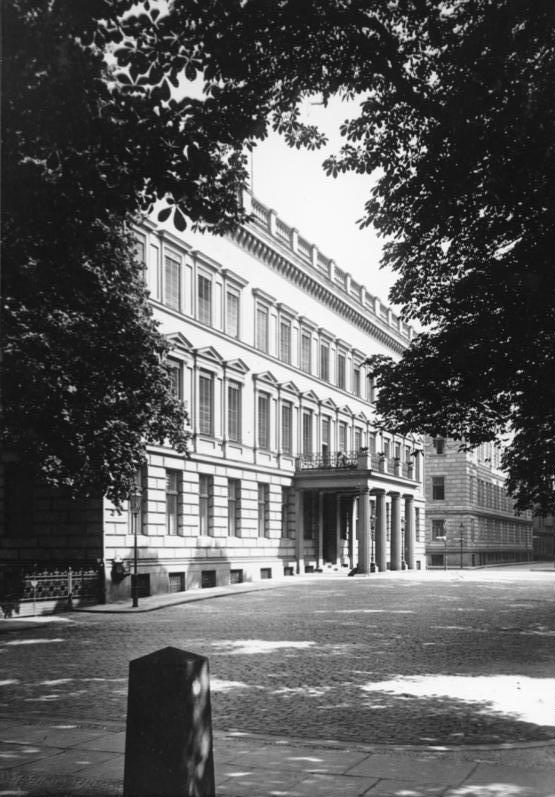
The building as headquarters of the Prussian Finance Ministry (1930)

After Donner's death in 1787 the Prussian Finance Ministry purchased the palace and provided lodgings on the top floor for its senior officers. In 1797 the right side wing was raised one storey. The reformist Prussian statesman Heinrich Friedrich Karl vom und zum Stein lived there from 1804 to 1806. In 1863-1864 the building was altered according to plans by the architects Georg Heinrich Bürde and Hermann von der Hude, who redesigned the main staircase and laid out a sequence of several prestigious interconnected rooms on the bel étage. From 1906 until 1944 the palace was the official headquarters of the Prussian Finance Ministry and the residence of 48 ministers. Further modifications took place in 1934 when the Prussian finance minister Johannes Popitz built into the eastern ground floor room the formal dining room of the historic Weydinger House on Unterwasserstrasse. The hall was of high artistic value, being the only remaining example of interior decoration by the prominent Prussian architect Karl Friedrich Schinkel, who had designed the banquet room of this private residence in 1830. Owned by the Prussian state since 1860, Weydinger House was torn down to construct the Reichsbank, the central bank of Germany from 1876 until 1945.

In World War II the palace was slightly damaged in air strikes and by combat taking place at the end of the war. The Soviet Military Administration in Germany (SMAD) had the building repaired and used it for various purposes, opening it to the public in 1947 as the House of Soviet Culture (Haus der Kultur der Sowjetunion). In 1949, now as an institution of the GDR, it became the House of German-Soviet Friendship (run by the Gesellschaft für Deutsch-Sowjetische Freundschaft). As one of the so-called mass organizations of the GDR, it had the mandate to convey to the German population knowledge about the culture and society of the Soviet Union.

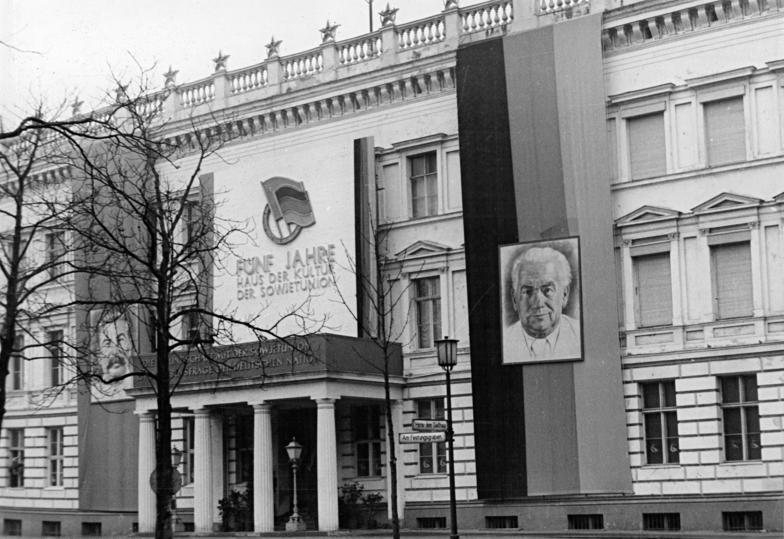
The building decorated to celebrate the fifth anniversary in 1952 of the House of Soviet Culture/ House of German-Soviet Friendship

After German reunification the listed building came under the ownership of the Federal State of Berlin, was extensively renovated, and renamed Palais am Festungsgraben. Since its founding in 1991 the 99-seat, innovative Theater im Palais has been located on the ground floor, and in September 2004 the federal state of Saarland rented 200 square meters of exhibition space in the palace for an art gallery, the Saarländische Galerie, featuring work by contemporary artists from the Czech Republic, France, Luxemburg, and Belgium as well as from Saarland and Berlin.
