= Karl Friedrich Schinkel =

Prussian architect, city planner and painter (1781–1841)

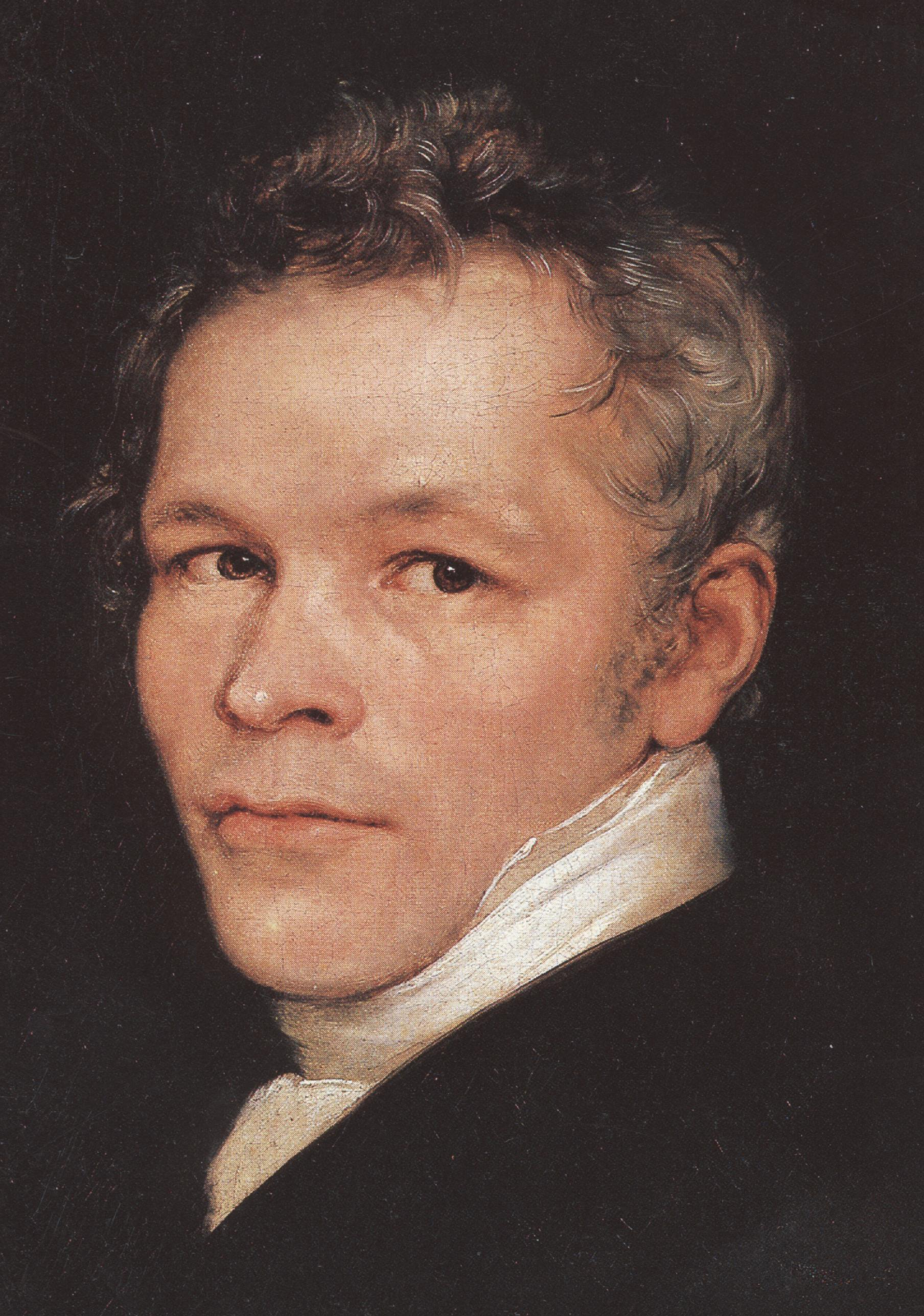
- Schinkel in 1836: by Carl Joseph Begas
- Born: 13 March 1781; Neuruppin, Margraviate of Brandenburg
- Died: 9 October 1841 (aged 60); Berlin, Province of Brandenburg
- Occupations: Architect, city planner, painter
- Known for: Neoclassical and Neo-Gothic buildings
- Spouse: Susanne Berger (m. 1809)
- Children: Marie (1810–1864), Susanne (1811–1864), Karl Raphael (1813–1878) and Elisabeth (1822–1851)

Karl Friedrich Schinkel (German pronunciation: [ˈkaʁl ˈfʁiːdʁɪç ˈʃɪŋkl̩]; 13 March 1781 – 9 October 1841) was a Prussian architect, city planner and painter who also designed furniture and stage sets. Schinkel was one of the greatest German architects, a nineteenth century design genius, and a leader in the International Neoclassical and Gothic Revival movements. His most famous buildings are found in and around Berlin, where he influenced the city's design and landscape profoundly. Schinkel's Bauakademie is considered one of the forerunners of modern architecture. His Altes Museum is one of the most important classical buildings in Europe and a model for future national art museums throughout the world.

== Biography ==
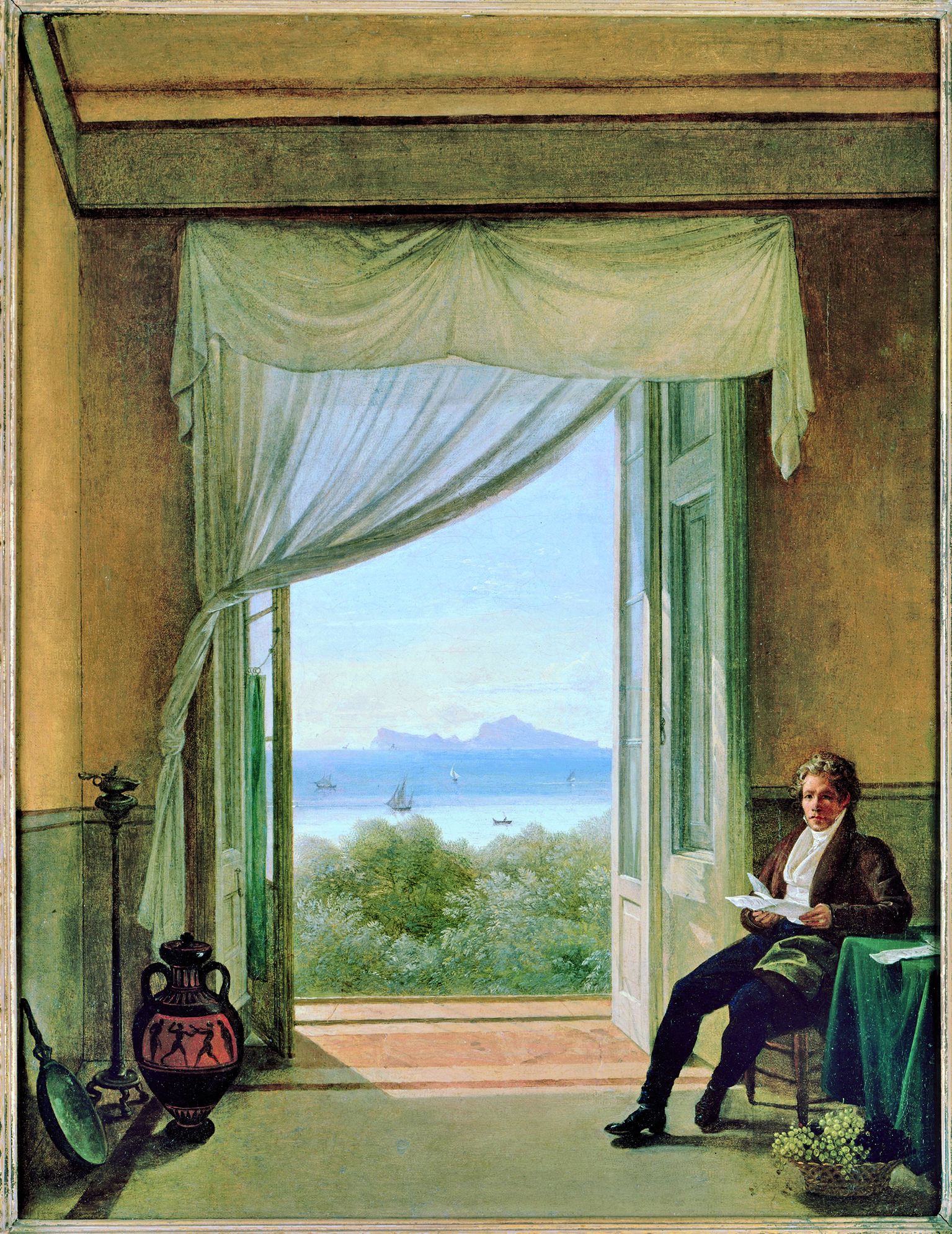
Franz Ludwig Catel, Schinkel in Naples, 1824

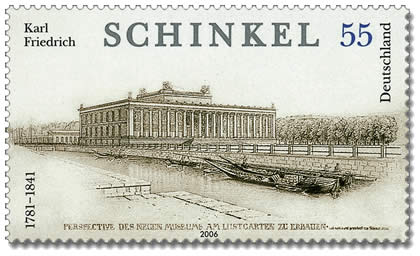
A stamp with Schinkel's Altes Museum

Schinkel was born in Neuruppin, Margraviate of Brandenburg. When he was six, his father died in the disastrous Neuruppin fire of 1787. He became a student of architect Friedrich Gilly (1772–1800) (the two became close friends) and his father, David Gilly, in Berlin. At that time, the architectural taste in Prussia was shaped in Neoclassical style, mainly by Carl Gotthard Langhans, the architect of the Brandenburg Gate in Berlin.

After returning to Berlin from his first trip to Italy in 1805, he started to earn his living as a painter. When he saw Caspar David Friedrich's painting Wanderer above the Sea of Fog at the 1810 Berlin art exhibition he decided that he would never reach such mastery of painting and turned to architecture. Working for the stage, in 1816 he created a star-spangled backdrop for the appearance of the "Königin der Nacht" in Wolfgang Amadeus Mozart's opera The Magic Flute, which is even quoted in modern productions of this perennial piece. After Napoleon's defeat, Schinkel oversaw the Prussian Building Commission. In this position, he was not only responsible for reshaping the still relatively unspectacular city of Berlin into a representative capital for Prussia, but also oversaw projects in the expanded Prussian territories from the Rhineland in the west to Königsberg in the east, such as New Altstadt Church.

From 1808 to 1817 Schinkel renovated and reconstructed Schloss Rosenau, Coburg, in the Gothic Revival style. He also rebuilt the ruins of Chorin Abbey.

At age 60, on 9 October 1841, Schinkel died in Berlin, Province of Brandenburg.

== Commemoration ==
His portrait appeared on the 1,000 ℛ︁ℳ︁ banknote issued by the Reichsbank from 1936 until 1945. Printing ceased in 1945 but the note remained in circulation until the issue of the Deutsche Mark on 21 June 1948.

== Style ==
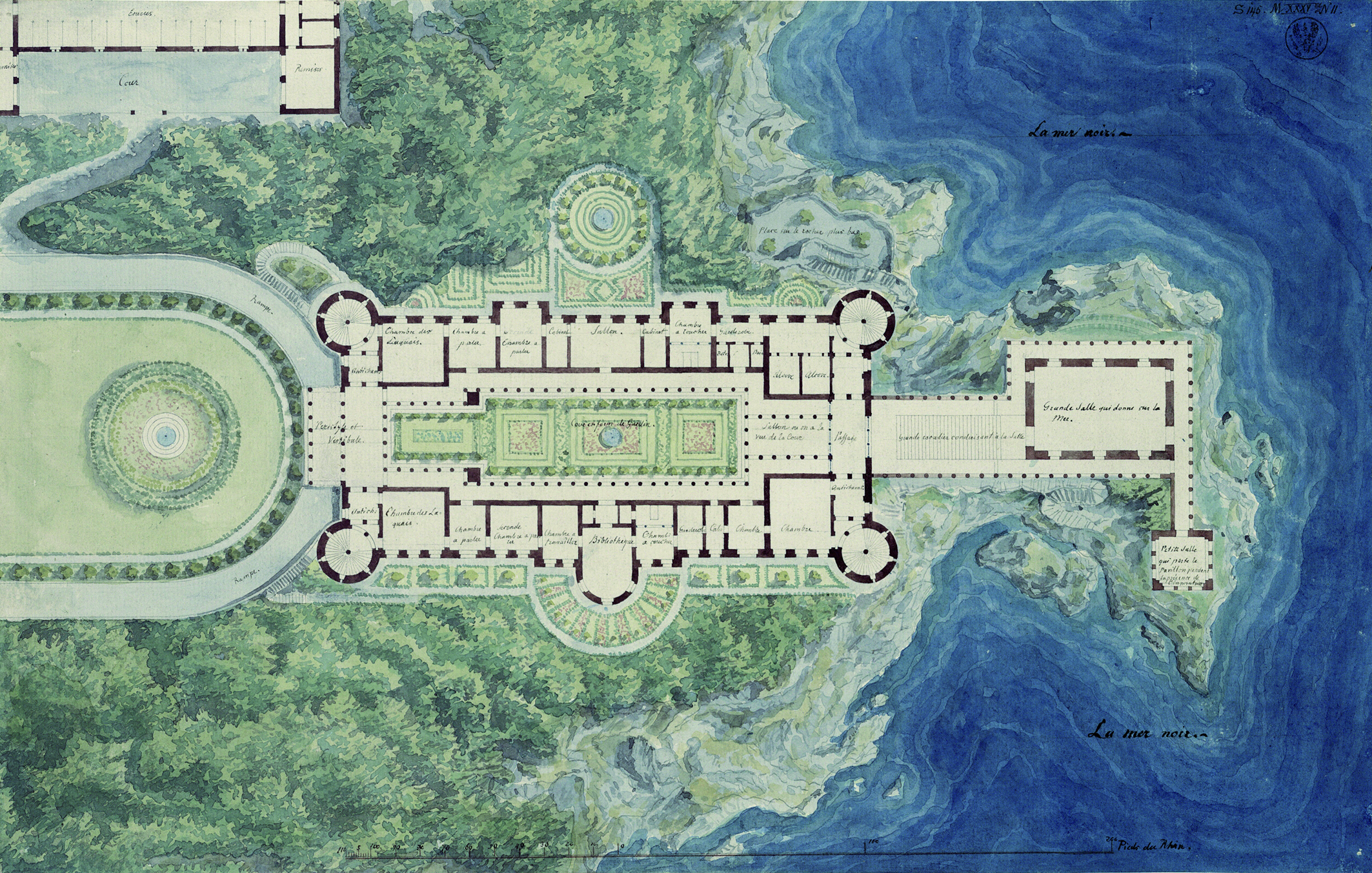
Floorplan of the proposed Orianda Palace, Crimea

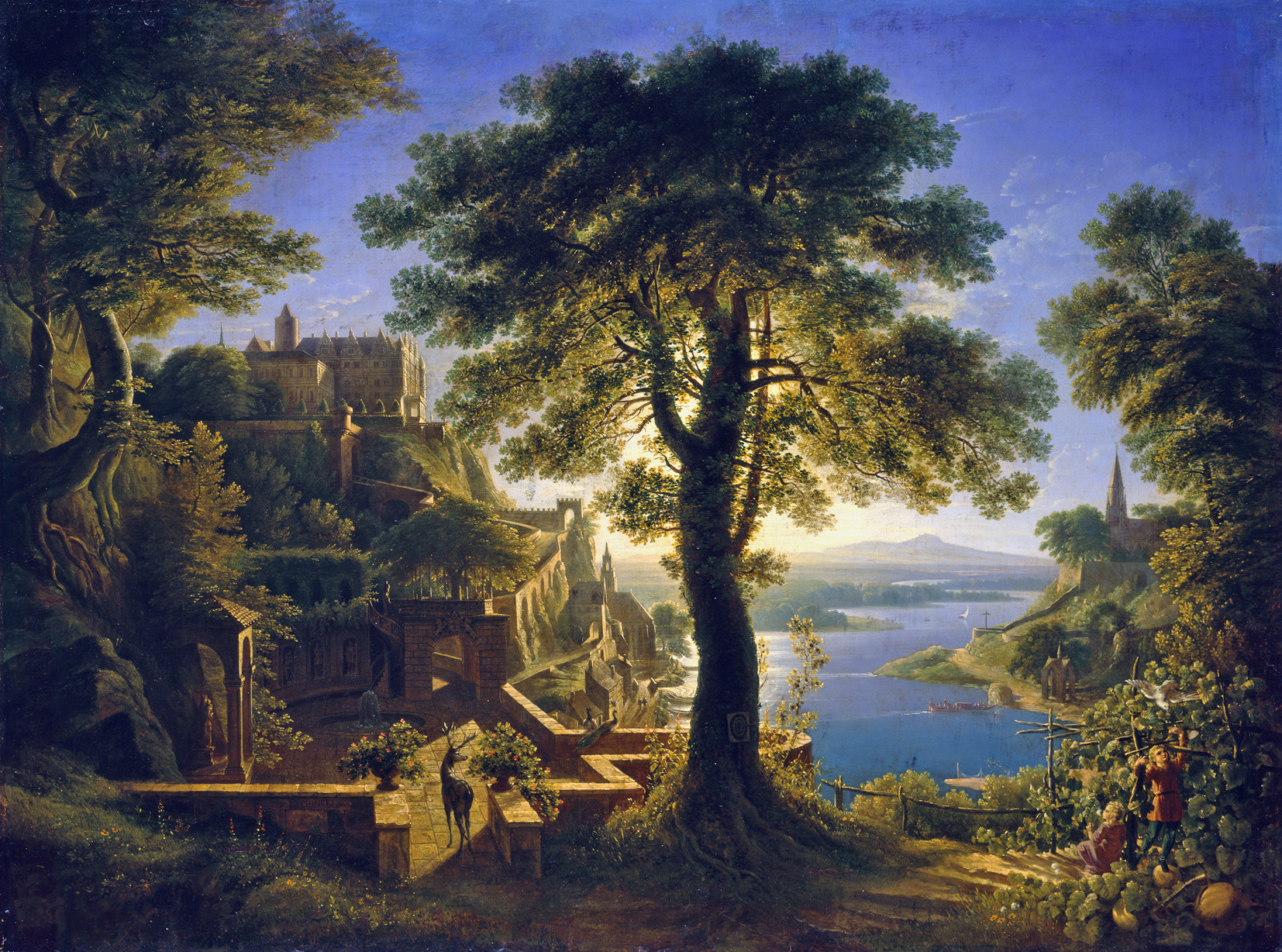
Castle by the River (Schloß am Strom), 1820

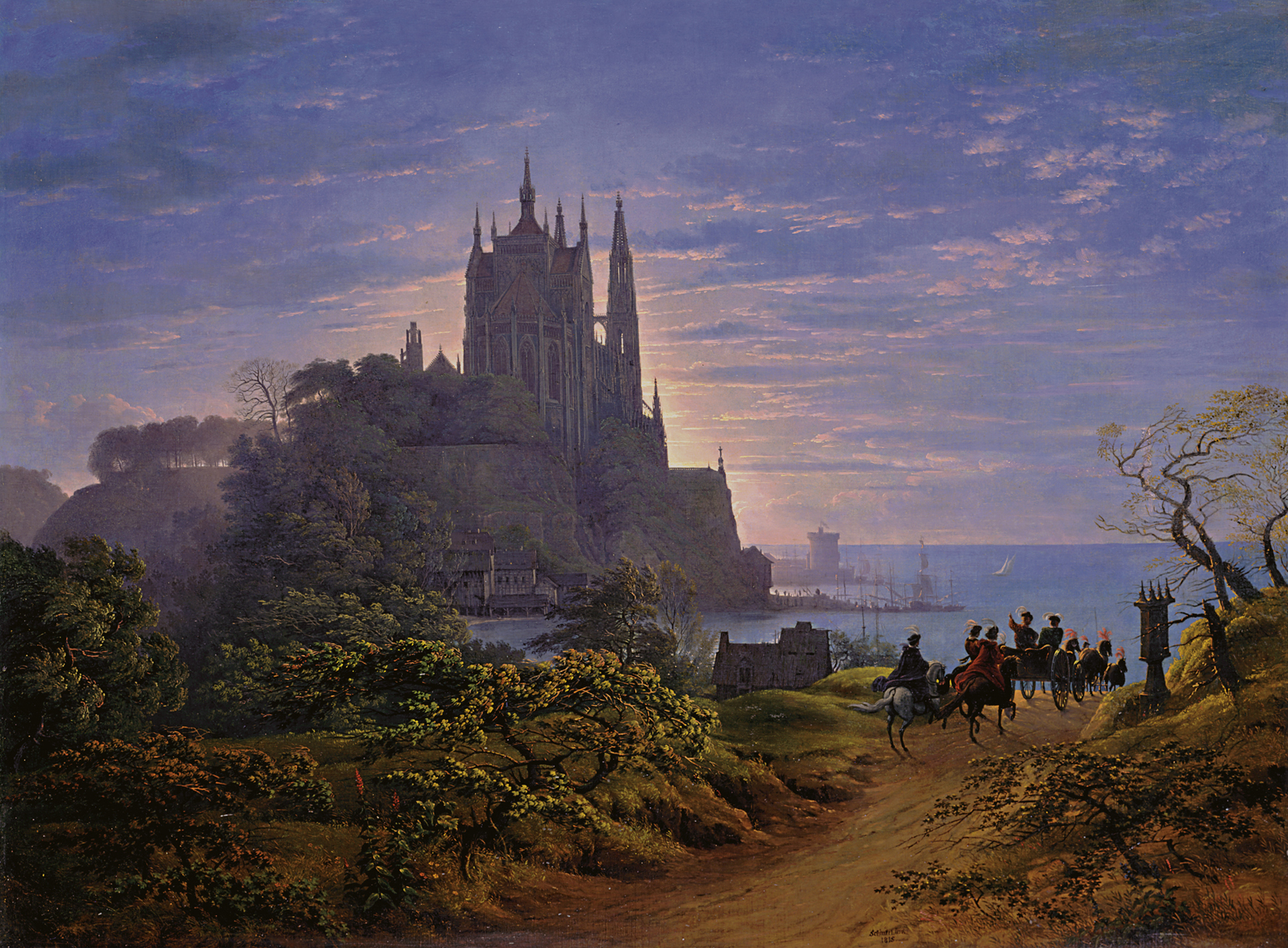
Gotische Kirche auf einem Felsen am Meer, 1815

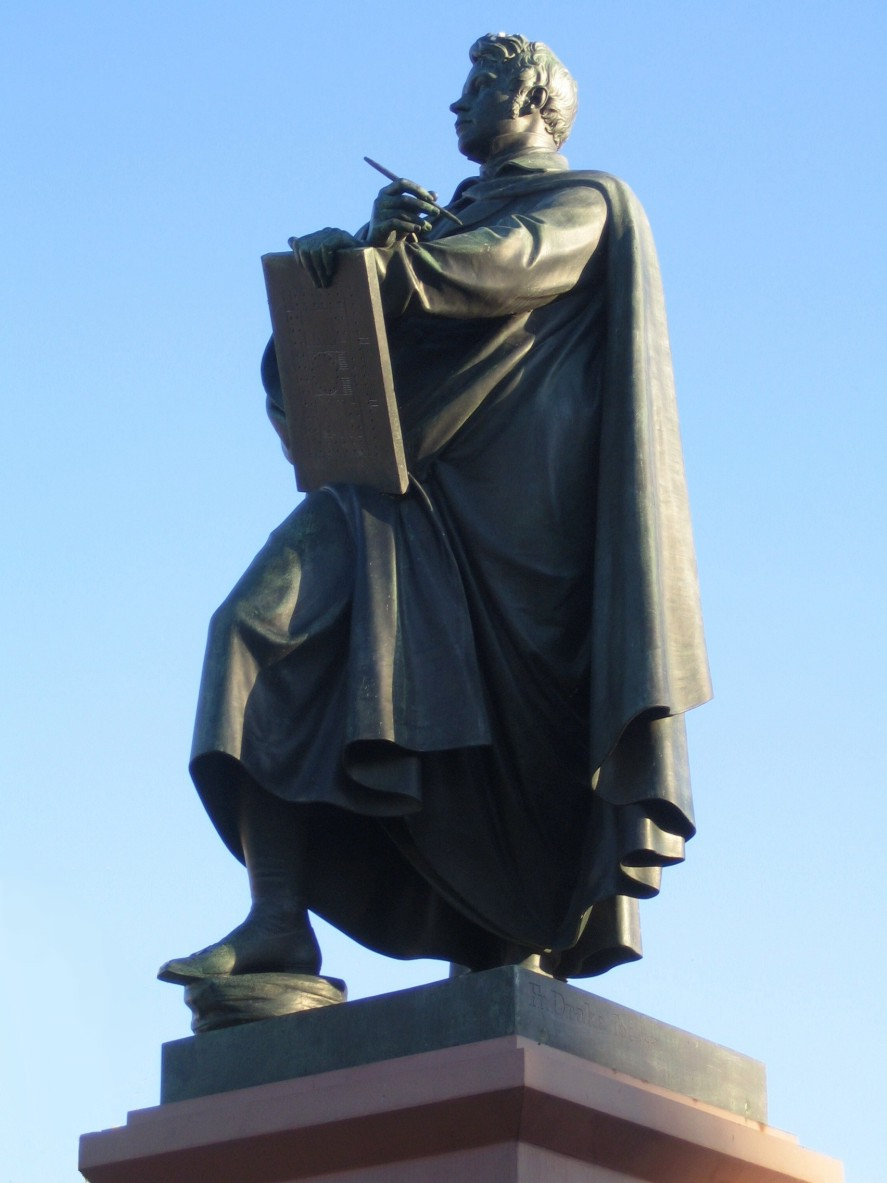
Monument to Schinkel at Schinkelplatz, Berlin

Schinkel's style, in his most productive period, is defined by a turn to Greek rather than Imperial Roman architecture, an attempt to turn away from the style that was linked to the recent French occupiers. (Thus, he is a noted proponent of the Greek Revival.) He believed that in order to avoid sterility and have a soul, a building must contain elements of the poetic and the past, and have a discourse with them.

His most famous extant buildings are found in and around Berlin. These include the Neue Wache (1816–1818), the National Monument for the Liberation Wars (1818–1821), the Schauspielhaus (1819–1821) at the Gendarmenmarkt, which replaced the earlier theatre that was destroyed by fire in 1817, and the Altes Museum on Museum Island (1823–1830). He also carried out improvements to the Crown Prince's Palace and to Schloss Charlottenburg. Schinkel was also responsible for the interior decoration of a number of private Berlin residences. Although the buildings themselves have long been destroyed, portions of a stairwell from the Weydinger House were able to be rescued and built into the Nicolaihaus on Brüderstr. and its formal dining hall into the Palais am Festungsgraben.

Schinkel was extensively patronised by the Prussian royal family, producing designs for Stolzenfels Castle and completing Charlottenhof Palace for King Frederick William IV and for his brothers, Babelsberg Palace and Glienicke Palace.

Between 1825 and 1827, he collaborated with Carl Theodor Ottmer on designs for the Berliner Singakademie for Sing-Akademie zu Berlin. Since 1952, it has been known as the Maxim Gorki Theatre.

Later, Schinkel expanded his stylistic range, embracing the Neo-Gothic in his Friedrichswerder Church (1824–1831). Schinkel's Bauakademie (1832–1836), his most important brick masonry building, seemed to point the way to more rationalist architecture, but nonetheless is full of terra cotta ornament, classical details, and extraordinary symbolic sculpture. It is far more similar to H.H. Richardson's Romanesque work than to any modernist building, and was one of the finest architectural school buildings ever built, precisely because it reflected a curriculum created by Schinkel and his colleagues.

Schinkel is noted as much for his theoretical work and his unbuilt projects as for the relatively few buildings that were actually executed to his designs. Some of his merits are best shown in his unexecuted plans for the transformation of the Athenian Acropolis into a royal palace for the new Kingdom of Greece and for the erection of the Orianda Palace in the Crimea. These and other designs may be studied in his Sammlung architektonischer Entwürfe (1820–1837) and his Werke der höheren Baukunst (1840–1842; 1845–1846). He also designed the famed Iron Cross medal of Prussia and later Germany. He worked on an unpublished architectural treatise that might well have influenced modern architects, as it looked at construction in various materials and extolled beauty as the highest form of artistic expression.

== Paintings ==
Paintings by Karl Friedrich Schinkel

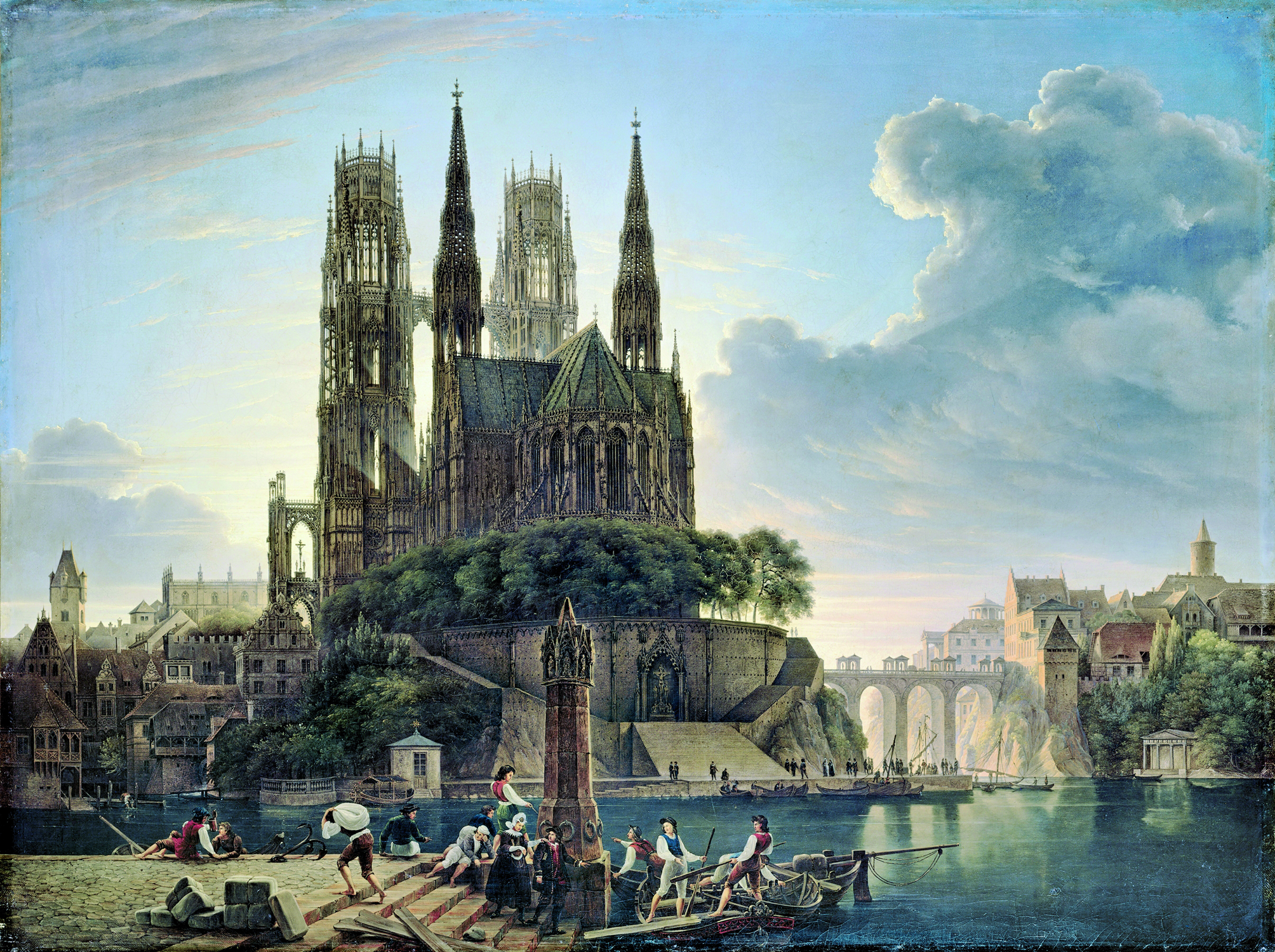
Gothic Cathedral by a River, 1813

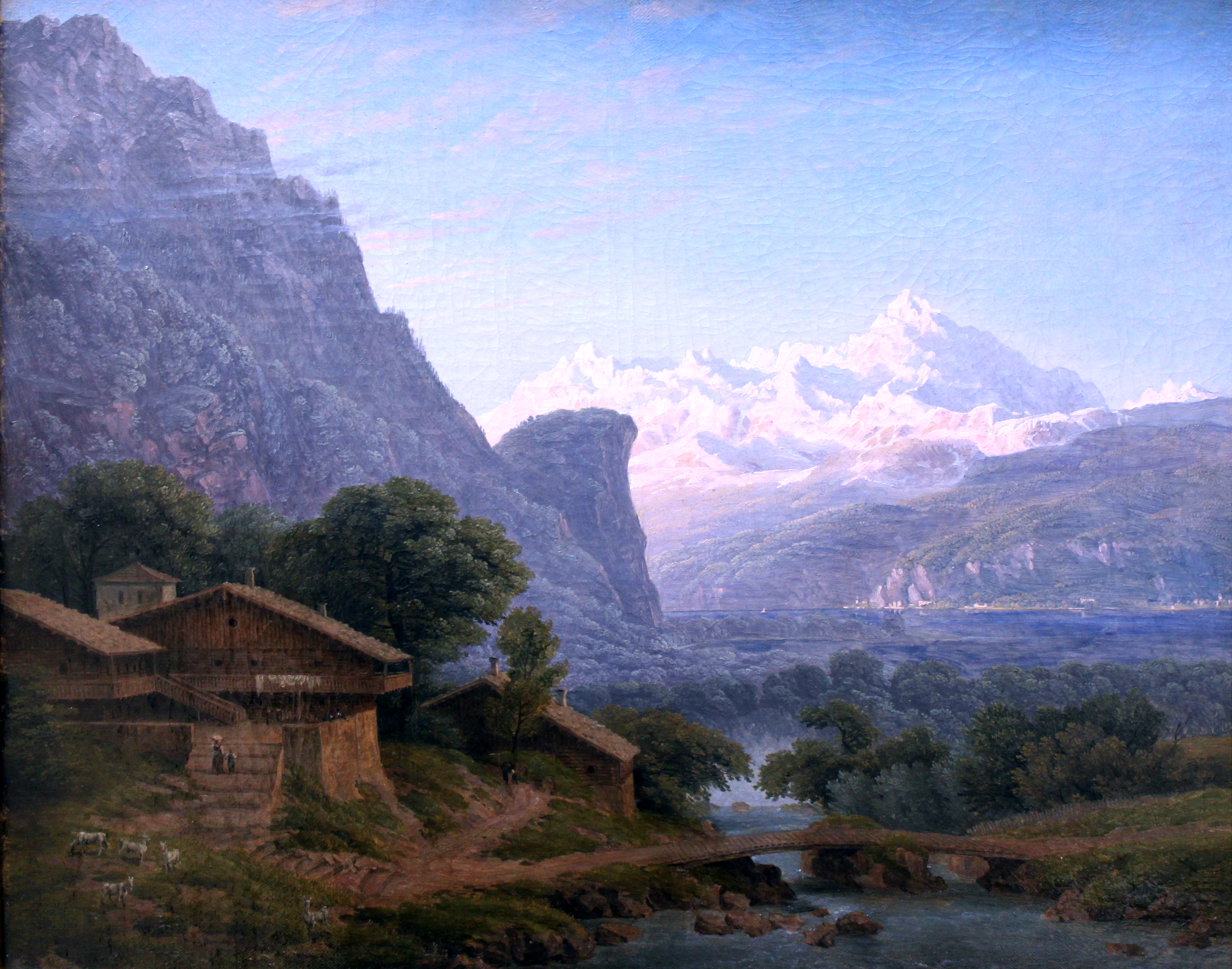
View of Mont Blanc, 1813

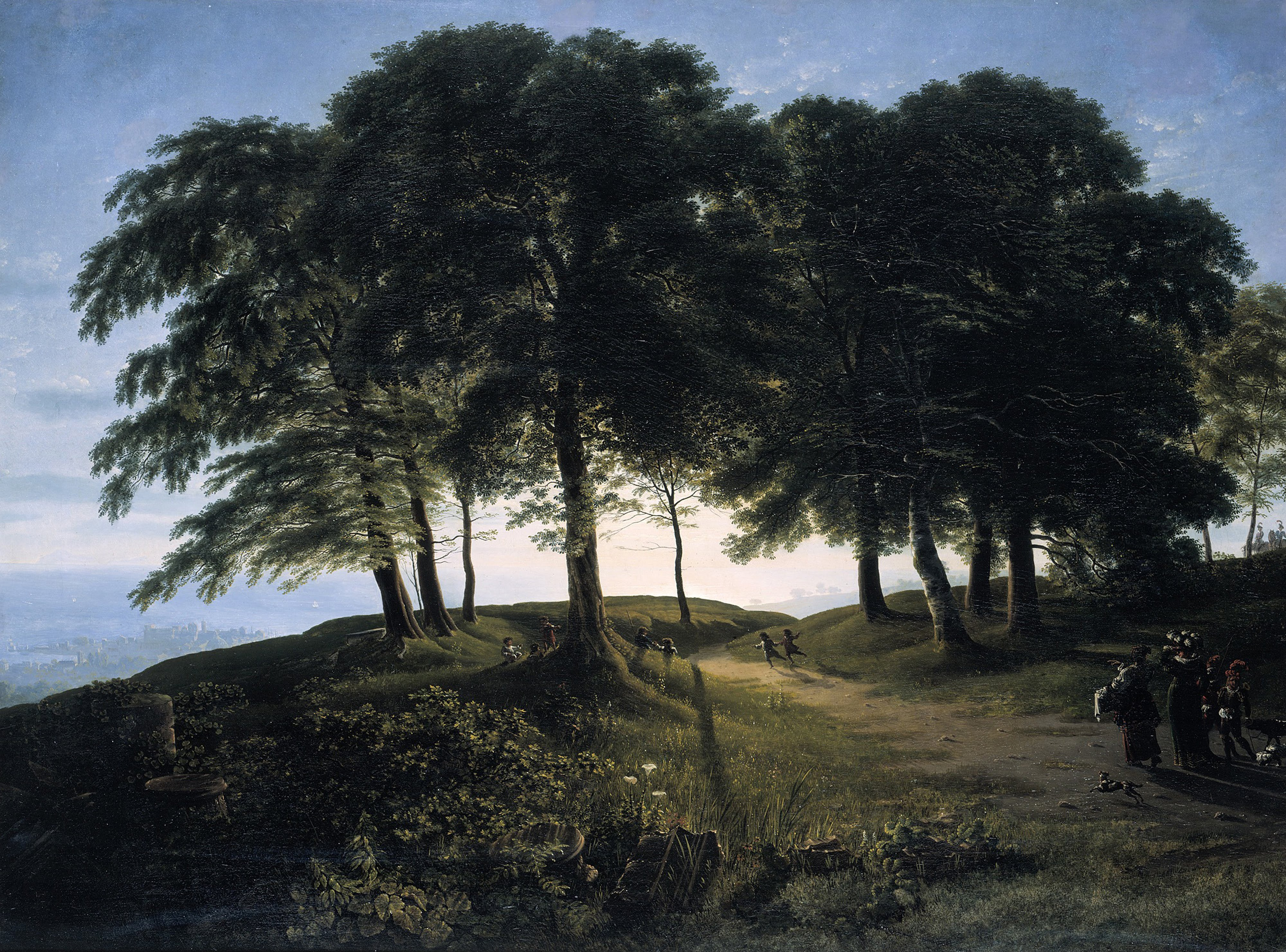
Morning, 1813

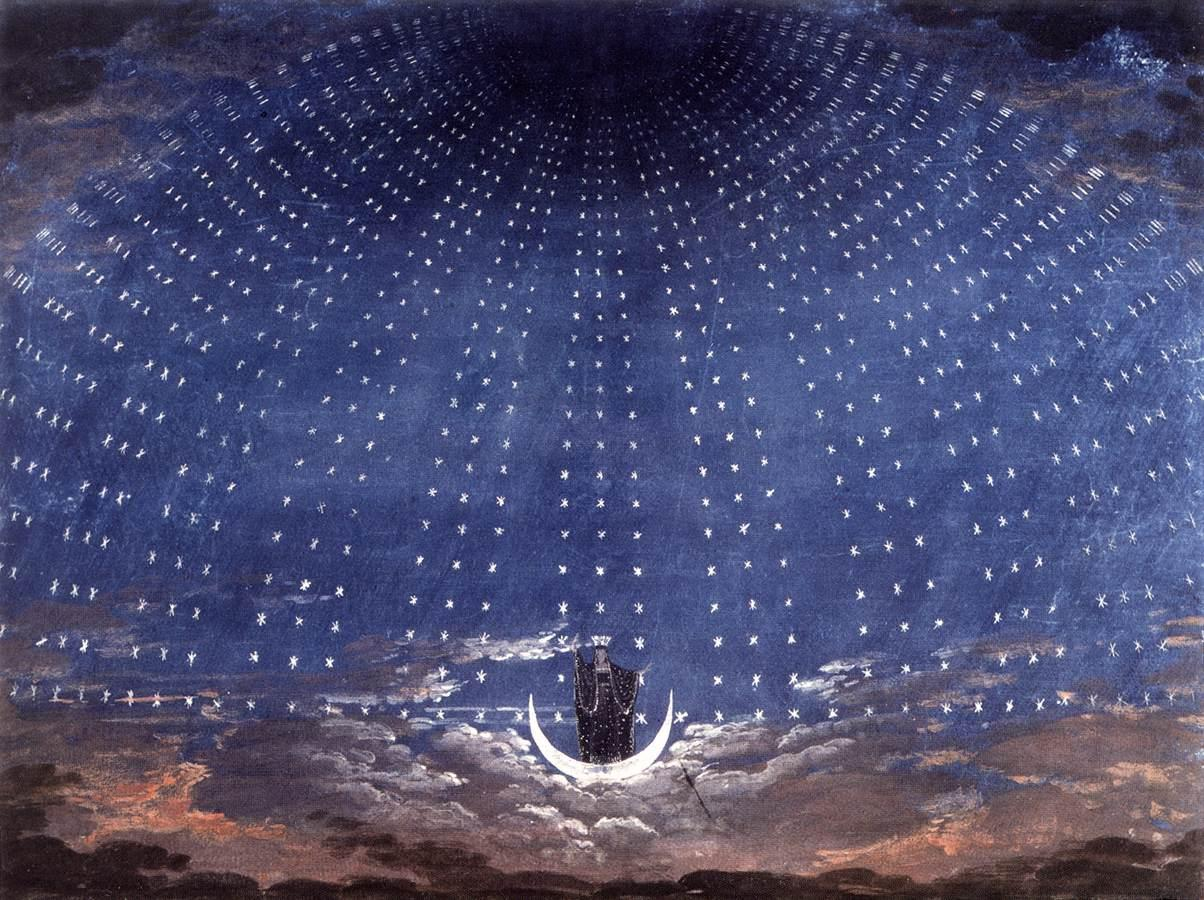
Karl Friedrich Schinkel's stage set for Mozart's Magic Flute, 1815

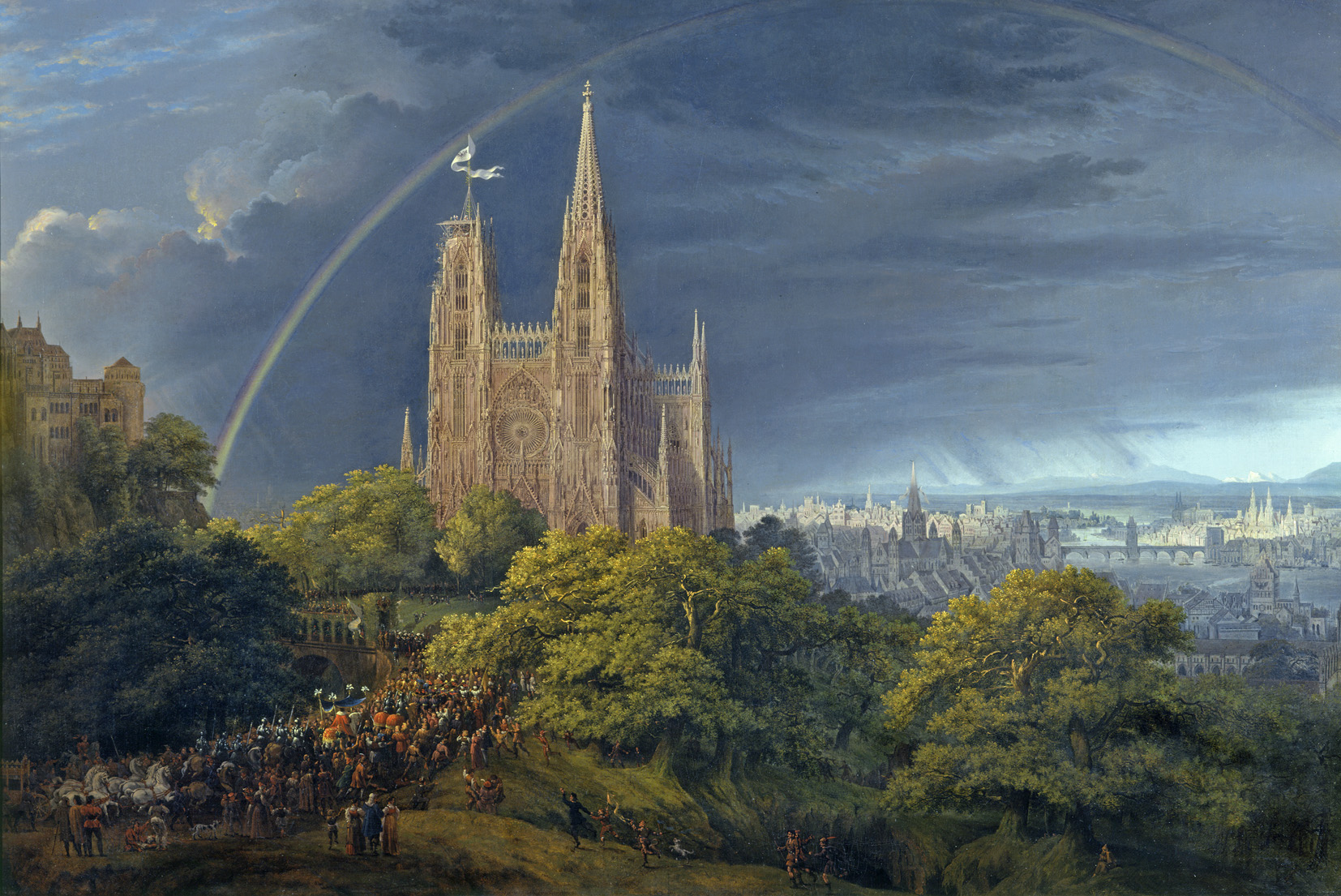
Medieval City on a River, 1815

Rock Arch, 1818

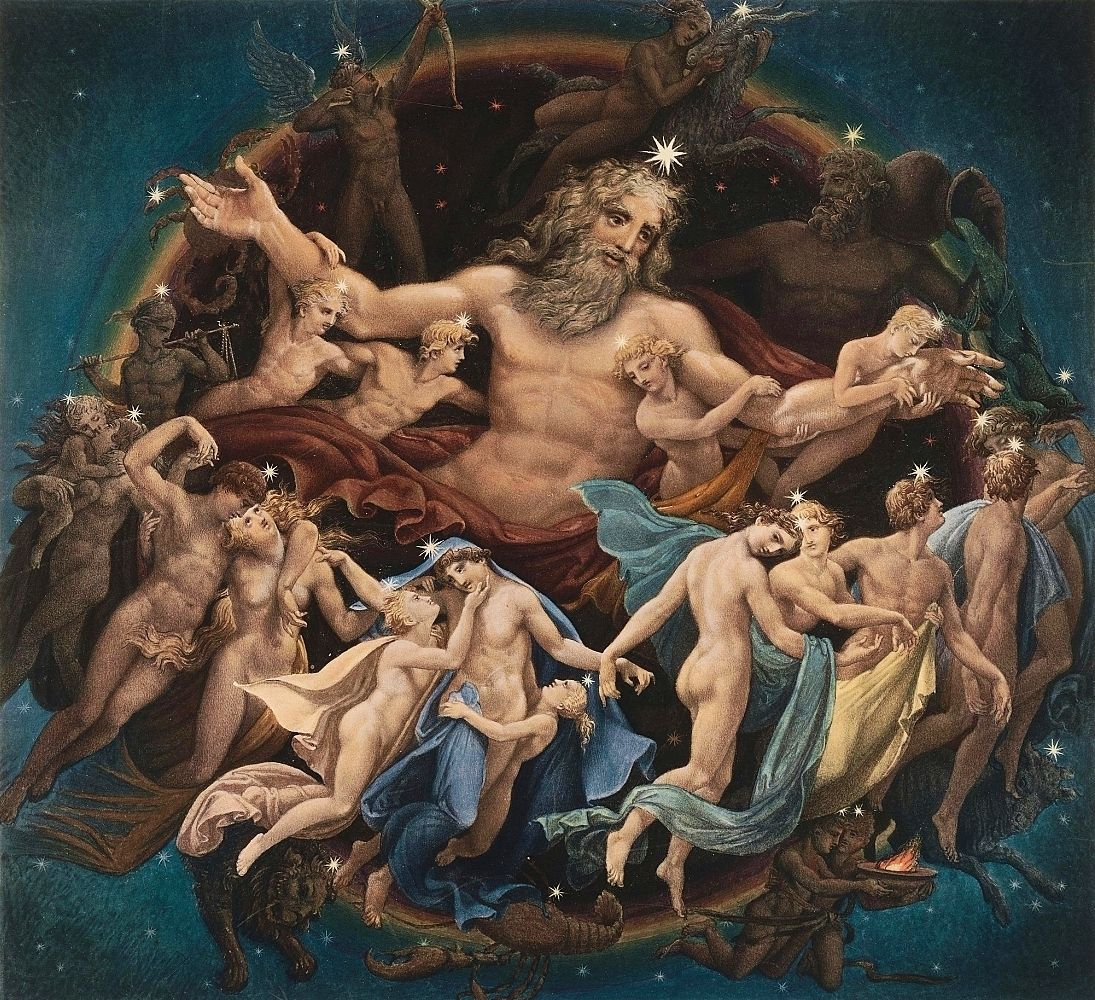
Uranus and the Dance of the Stars, 1834

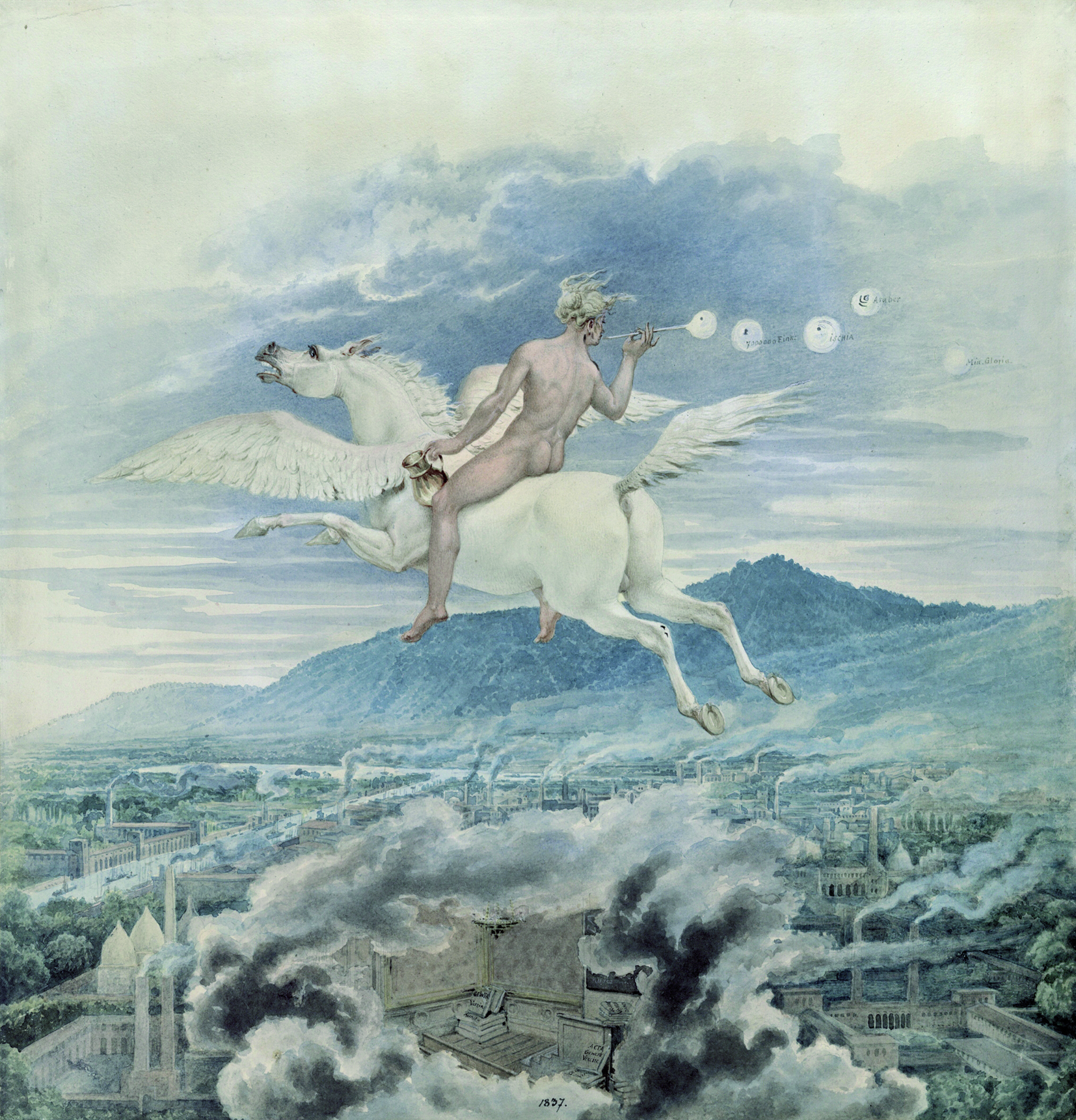
Christian Peter Wilhelm Beuth, 1837 (Allegory of Prussia's industrial renewal)

== Buildings ==
Selection of Karl Friedrich Schinkel's works

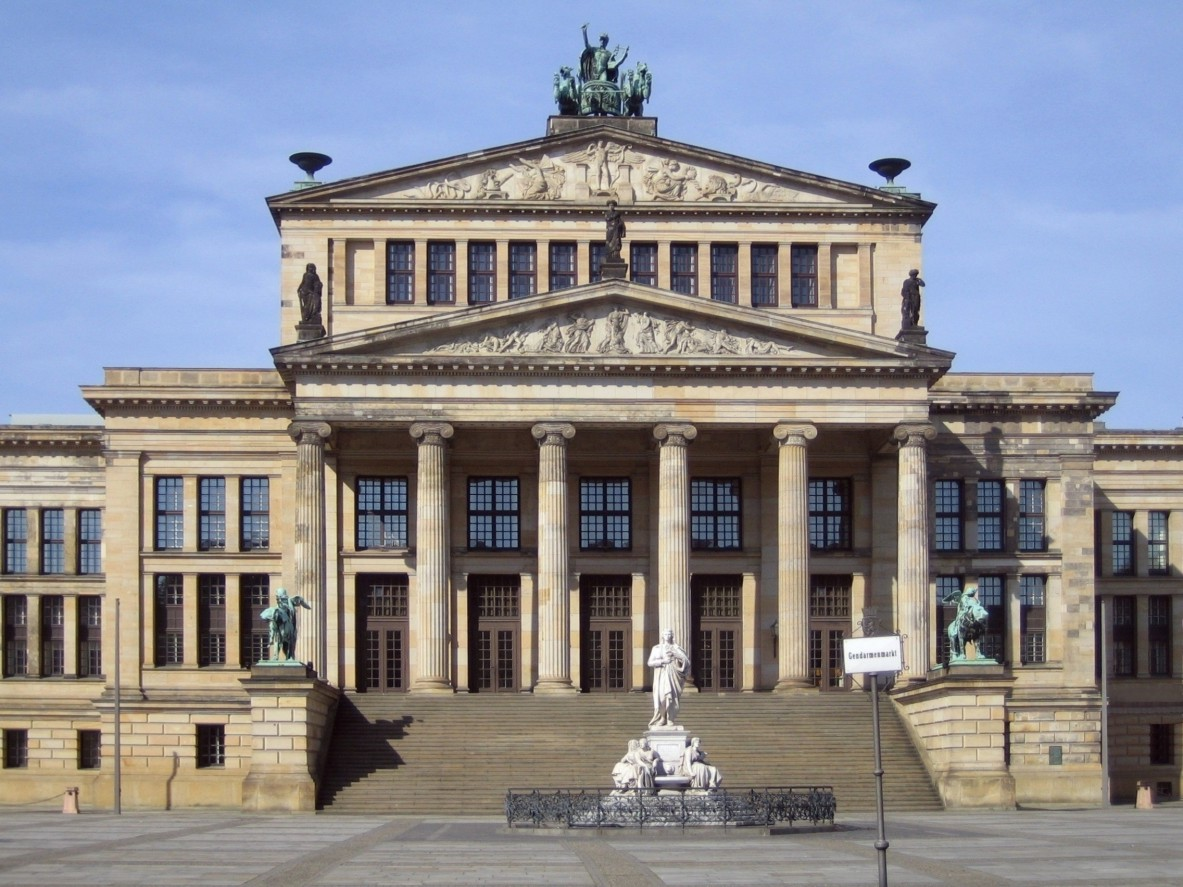
Konzerthaus, Berlin

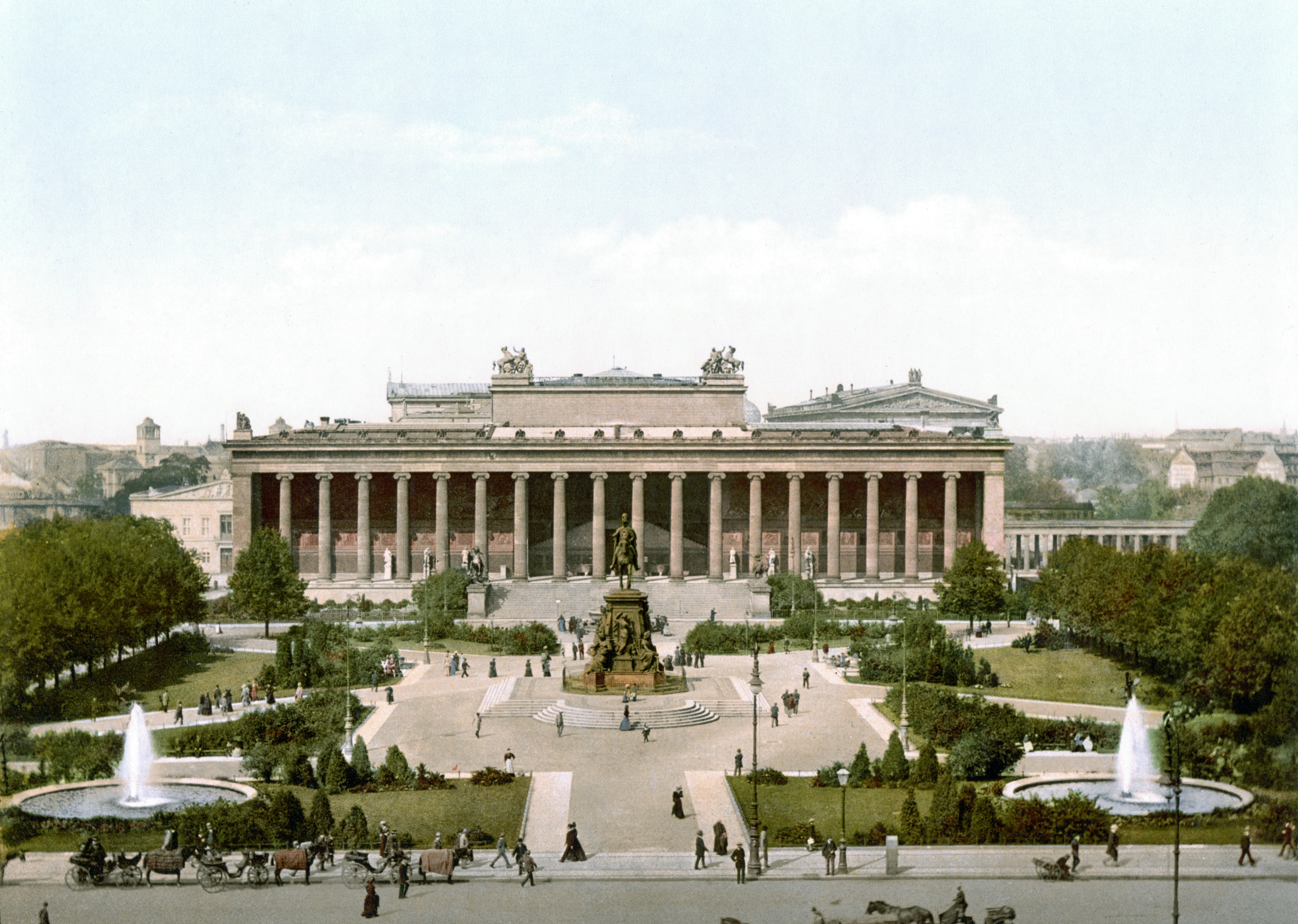
Altes Museum, Berlin

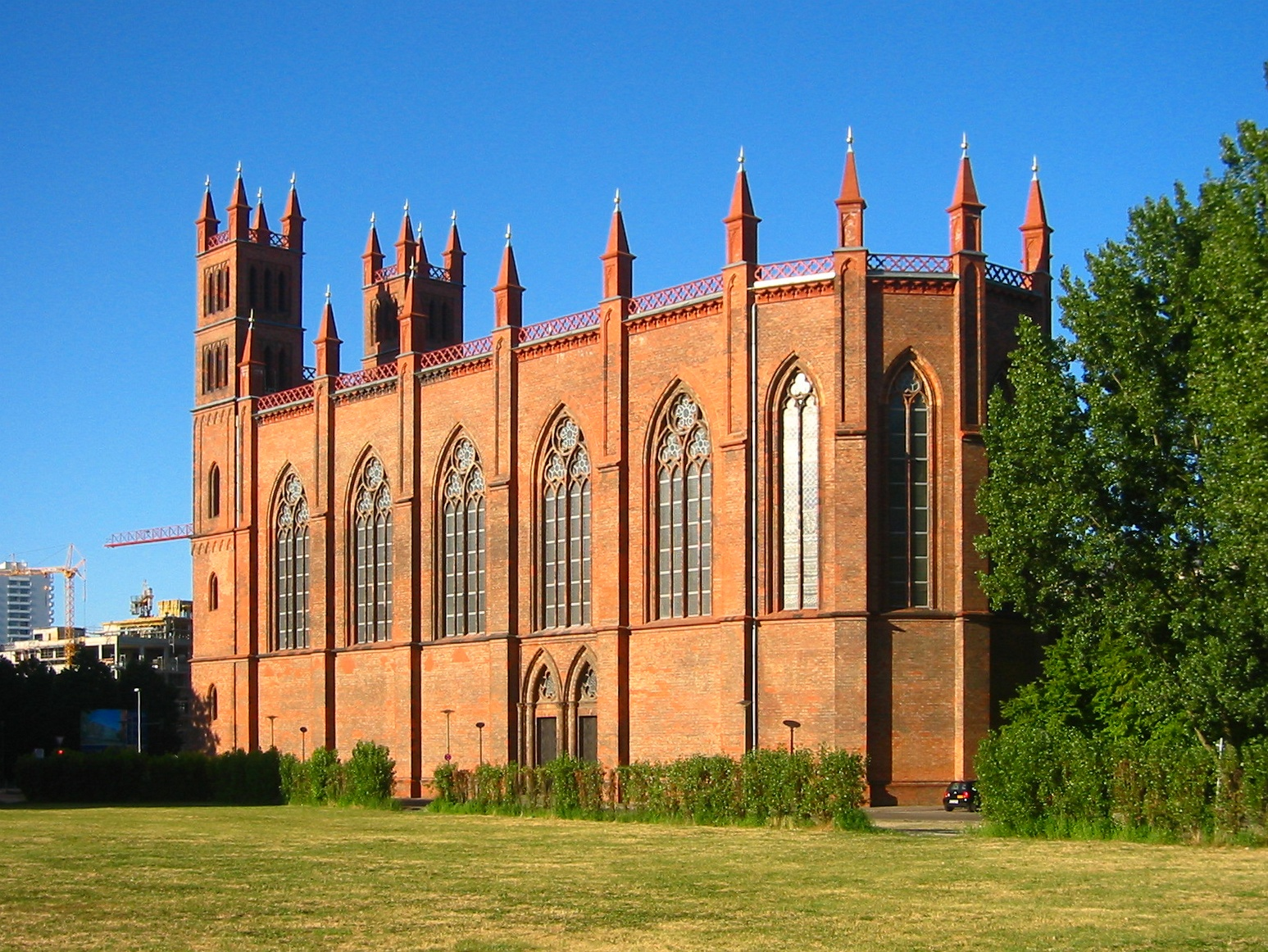
Friedrichswerdersche Kirche, Berlin

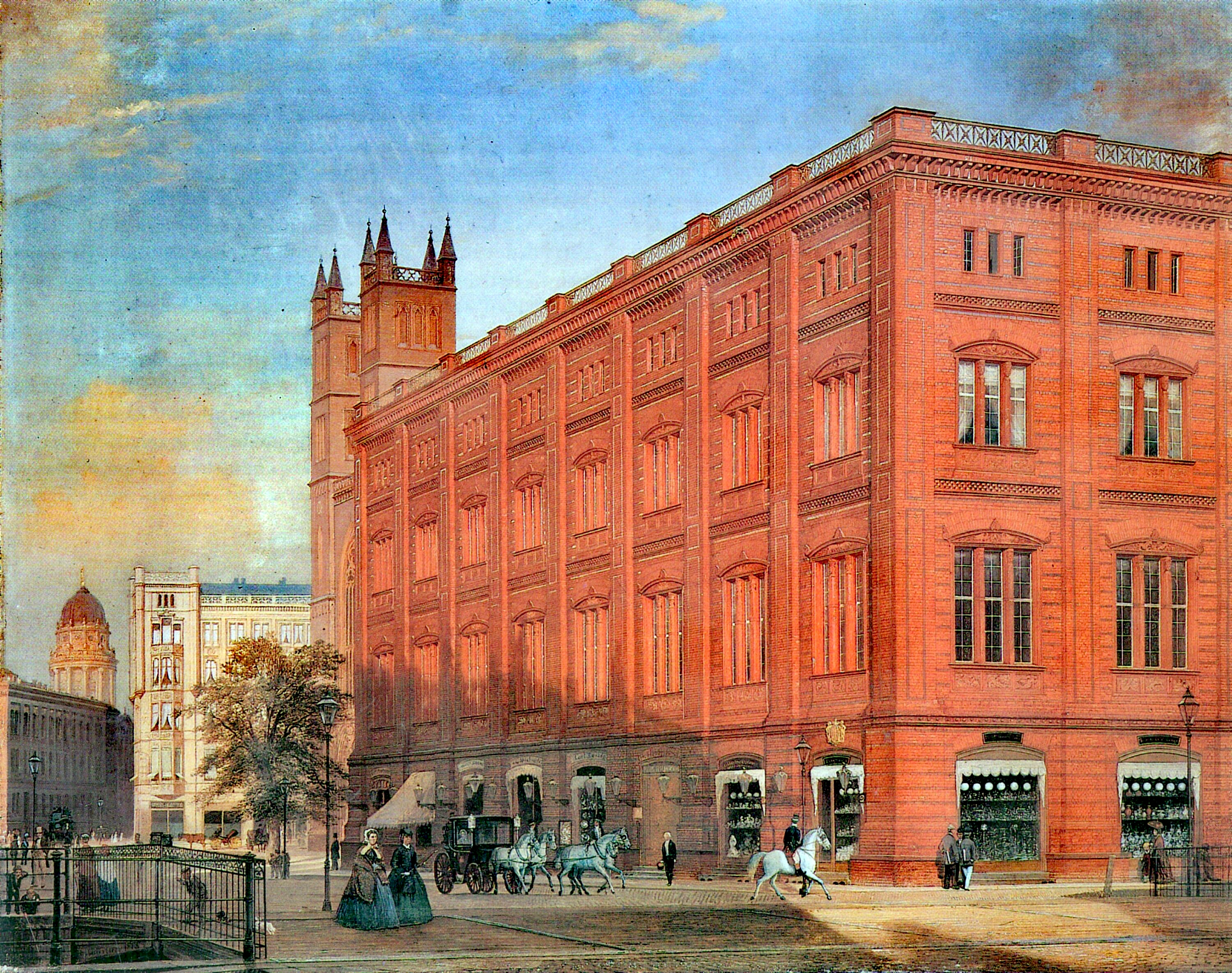
Bauakademie, Berlin

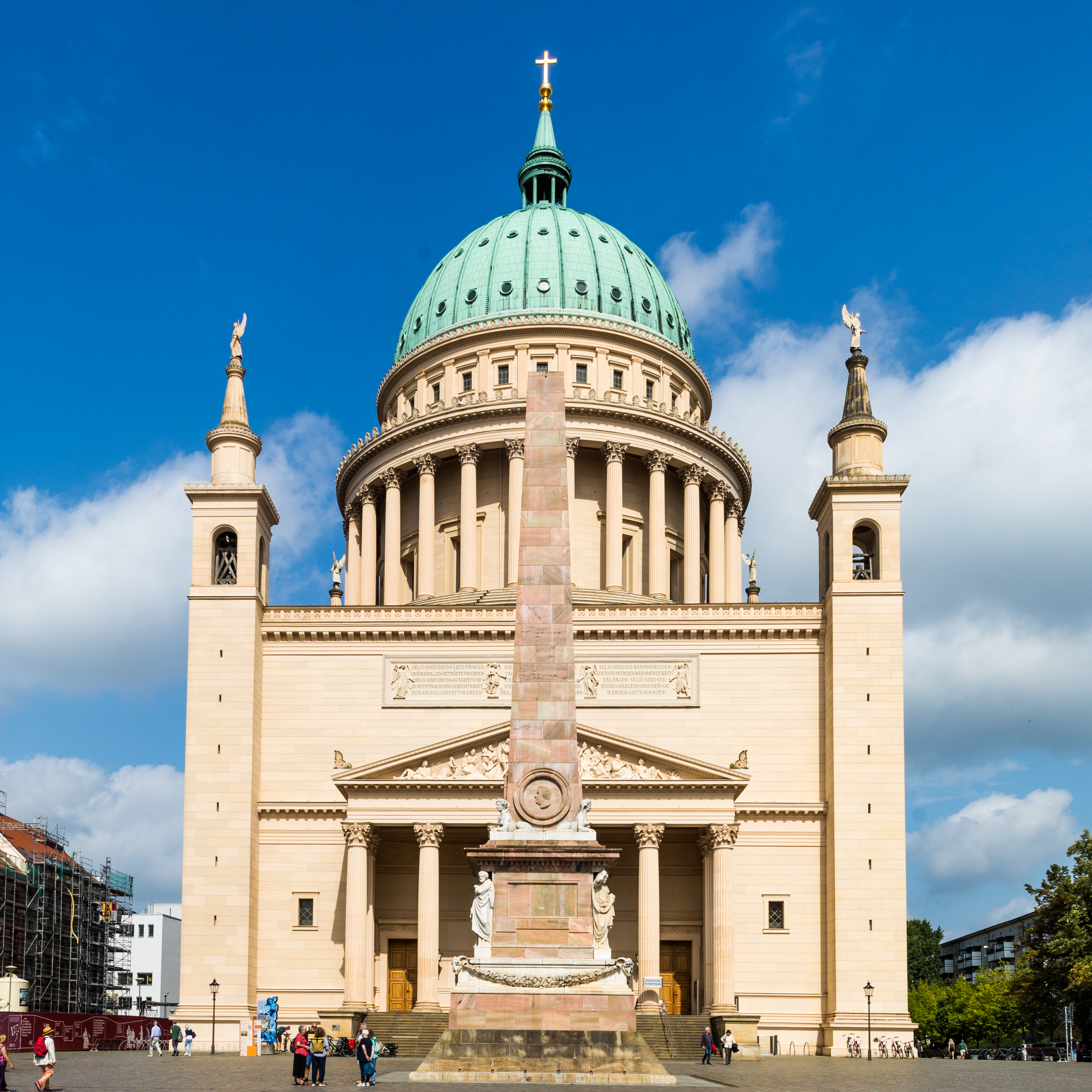
Potsdam Nikolaikirche

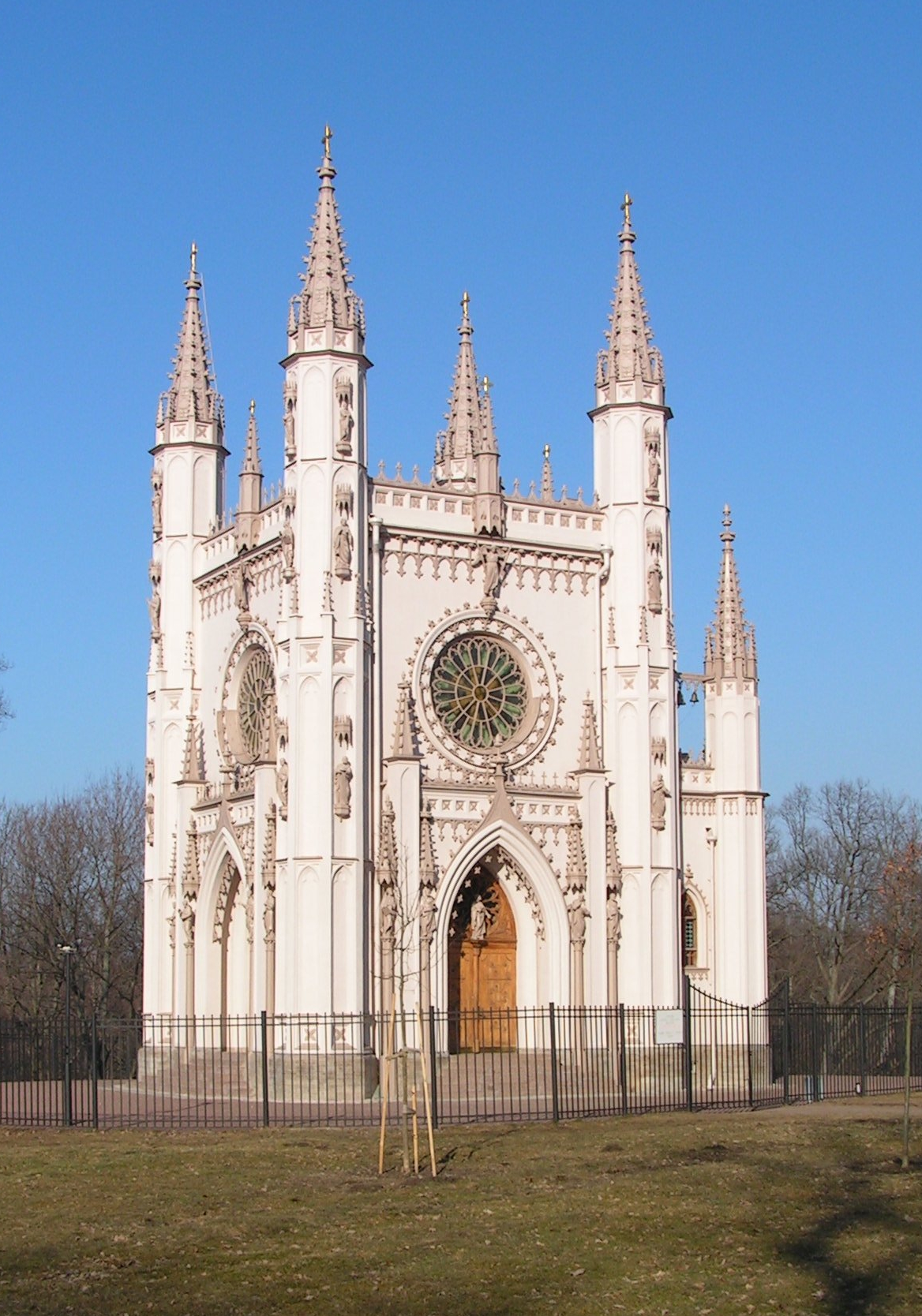
Alexander Nevsky chapel, Peterhof, Russia

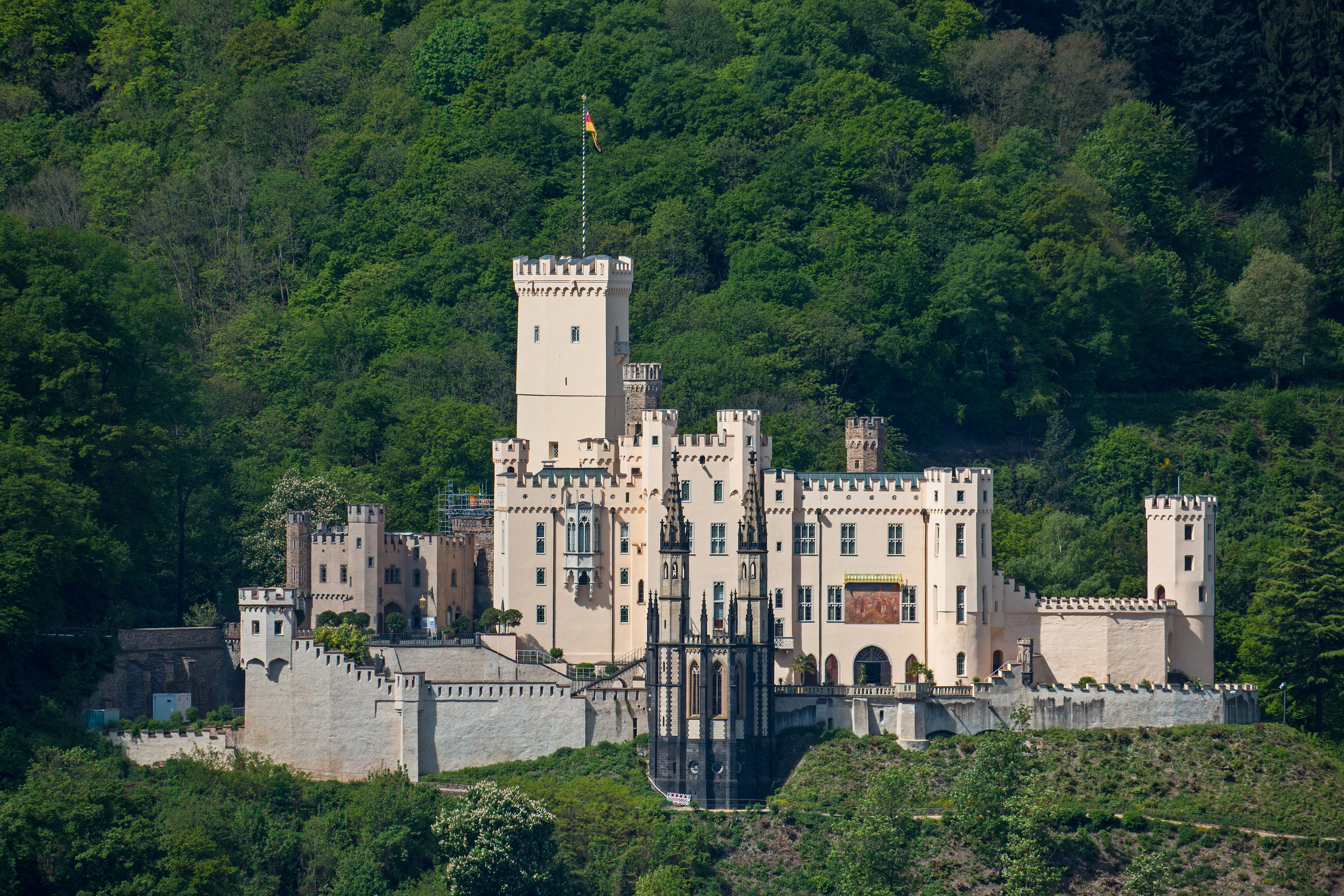
Schloss Stolzenfels

== See also ==
- Schinkel Gate
- Schinkelplatz
- Statue of Karl Friedrich Schinkel, Berlin
