= Veitel Heine Ephraim =

German court official (1703–1775)

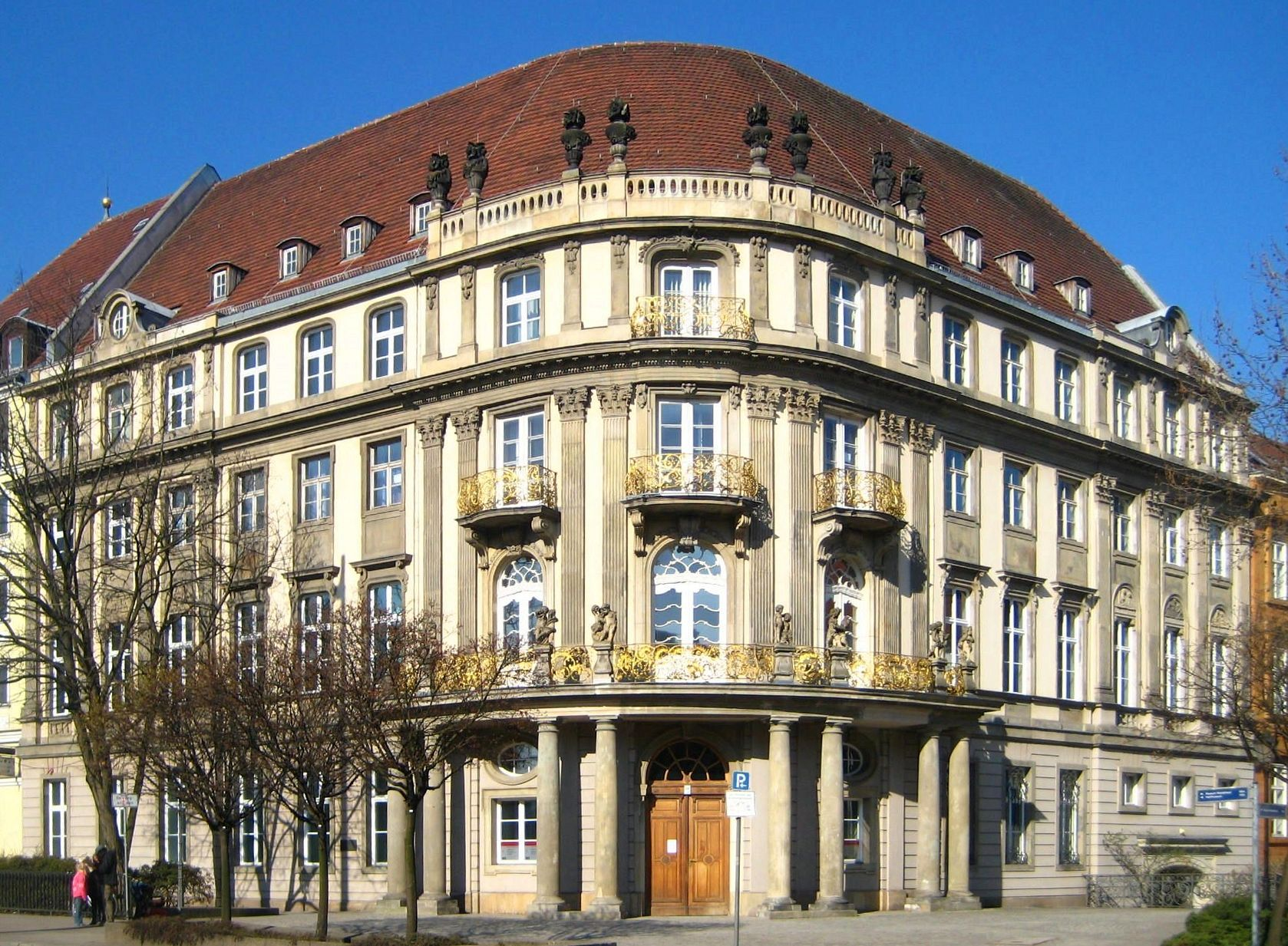
Ephraim-Palais

Veitel Heine Ephraim (1703 – 16 May 1775) was a jeweller, silk entrepreneur, mint master, and the chairman of the Jewish congregation in Berlin/Prussia. During the Seven Years' War, Frederick the Great devalued the Prussian coin five times in order to finance the war; debased coins were produced with the help from Ephraim and Daniel Itzig, and spread outside Prussia: in Saxony, Poland, and Kurland. Ephraim and his companion Itzig became infamous for adding copper, up to 70%, so as to debase the coins, which became known as Ephraimiten. Heinrich Carl von Schimmelmann, Johann Ernst Gotzkowsky, and Leendert Pieter de Neufville also cooperated in the debasement policy. The king's coinage policy became a key element of war financing.

== Life ==
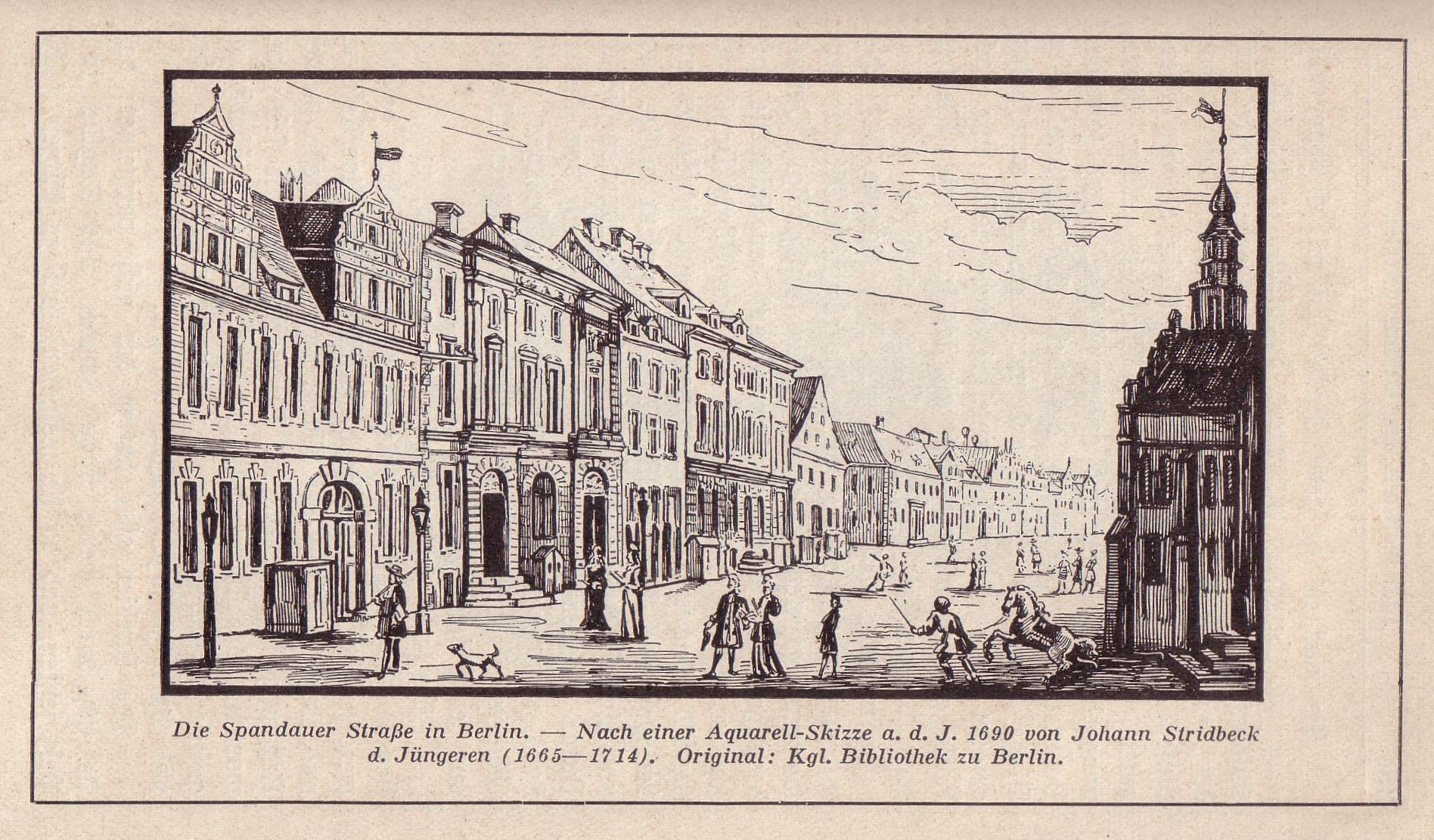
Spandauer Straße, after an aquarelle from 1690

Veitel Ephraim was the fifth child of Altona-born jeweller and elder of the Jewish Community Nathan Veitel Ephraim (1658–1748), who moved from Hamburg to Berlin. His mother came from Vienna. The Ephraim family lived in Spandauer Straße 30. Around 1744 or 1745, Ephraim became court jeweller of Friedrich II. They had known each other since 1738, when they met at Schloss Rheinsberg. Already as Crown Prince Friedrich was in debt to Ephraim. In 1748, Ephraim leased a factory in Potsdam for lace and had orphans taught in the production of it. Two years later, he was appointed by the King as the senior elder of the Berlin Jewry. In 1752 or 1754, Ephraim delivered silver to Johann Philipp Graumann, director of the Prussian mints.

== Mint activities ==
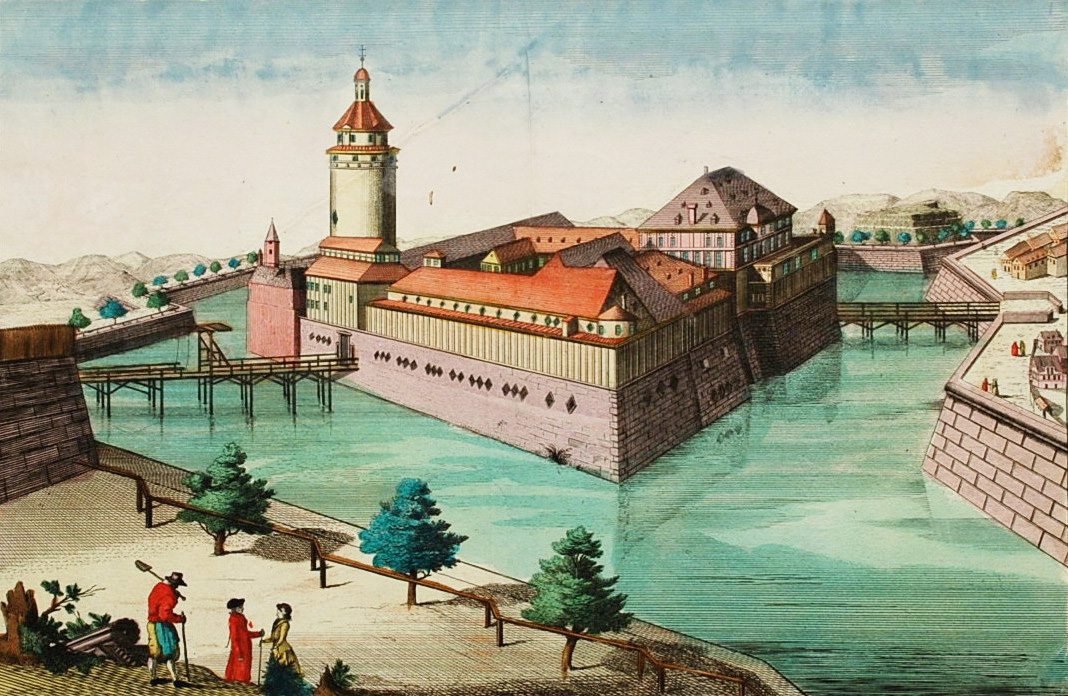
Pleißenburg where the Leipzig mint was located, and Ephraim was locked up in early 1758

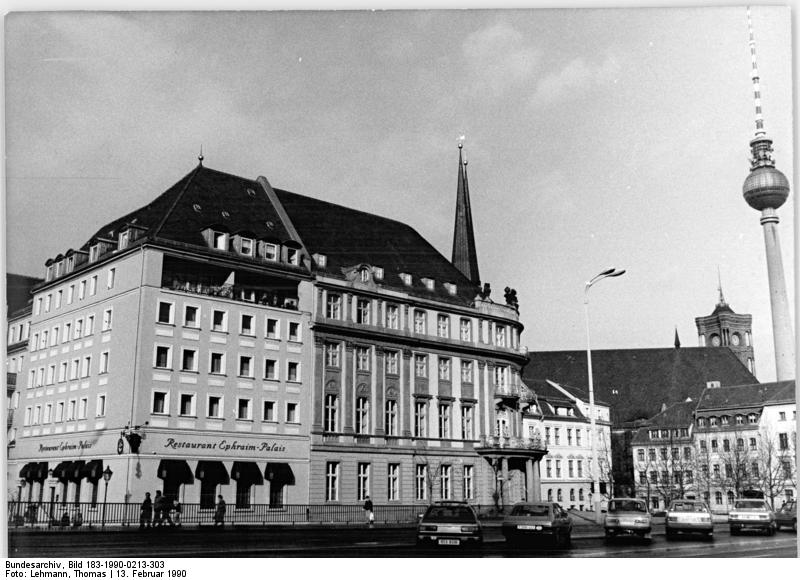
Berlin, Nikolaiviertel, Ephraimpalais

After Graumann's fall in early 1755, Veitel Ephraim and his brother-in-law Moses Fränkel leased the Königsberger mint. They were successful, such that under similar conditions they were given the lease of the mint of Cleves, where one of Ephraim's sons took charge on 16 August. In October 1755 he leased the mint facility in Aurich. At some time Friedrich II. ordered that the old and new Louis d'or had to be changed (stamped) into Friedrich d'or in Aurich. The coins could be used by the Prussian East India Company in Asia where they were worth 20% more. On 21 November 1756 Ephraim offered the king a premium of 20% for leasing the Leipzig mint facility. In Poland, Russia, and Hungary rogue traders traded the debased coins for the true coins circulating there, and sold them back to the mint.

They used their extensive business and relational foreign relations to acquire the necessary gold and silver in Holland, especially on the Amsterdam market, in England, and in Hamburg by means of Hamburg and Dutch exchange. Another way to raise money was to remelt gold subsidies received from England since the Anglo-Prussian Convention and to double and triple them by mixing them with other metals.

The revenue from the impact of the coin transactions from 1759 to 1762 exceeded 29 million Thaler and thus, for example, the amount of British subsidies. On 28 January 1764, Frederick the Great ordered Itzig and Ephraim that they invest the great assets they had earned in the Prussian economy. Ephraim left a fortune when he died; he is buried at the Jüdischer Friedhof (Berlin-Mitte).

== Personal life ==
In 1727 Ephraim married to Elke Fraenkel. They had four sons: Ephraim (1729–1803), Joseph (1731–1786), Zacharias (1736–1779) and Benjamin (1742–1811) and two daughters: Edel (1728–1750) and Rosel (1738–1803), who married Heimann Fraenkel (1748–1824). Ephraim's great-granddaughter was Sara Grotthuis, a noted literary salon hostess in Berlin around 1800.

== Sources ==
- Karl E. Groezinger (Ed.): Die Stiftungen der preußisch-jüdischen Hofjuweliersfamilie Ephraim und ihre Spuren in der Gegenwart. (= Jüdische Kultur. Vol. 19). Harrassowitz (publisher), Wiesbaden 2009.
- Studies in the Economic Policy of Frederick the Great by W.O. Henderson, p. 40
- Forgotten Fragments of the History of an Old Jewish Family by Louis and Henry Fraenkel. Kopenhagen 1975.
- Stern, S. (1950) The Court Jew; a contribution to the history of the period of absolutism in Central Europe. Philadelphia: Jewish Publication Society of America, 1950. Full text online at archive.org
