= Ephraimite (coin) =

Debased coins during the Seven Years' War

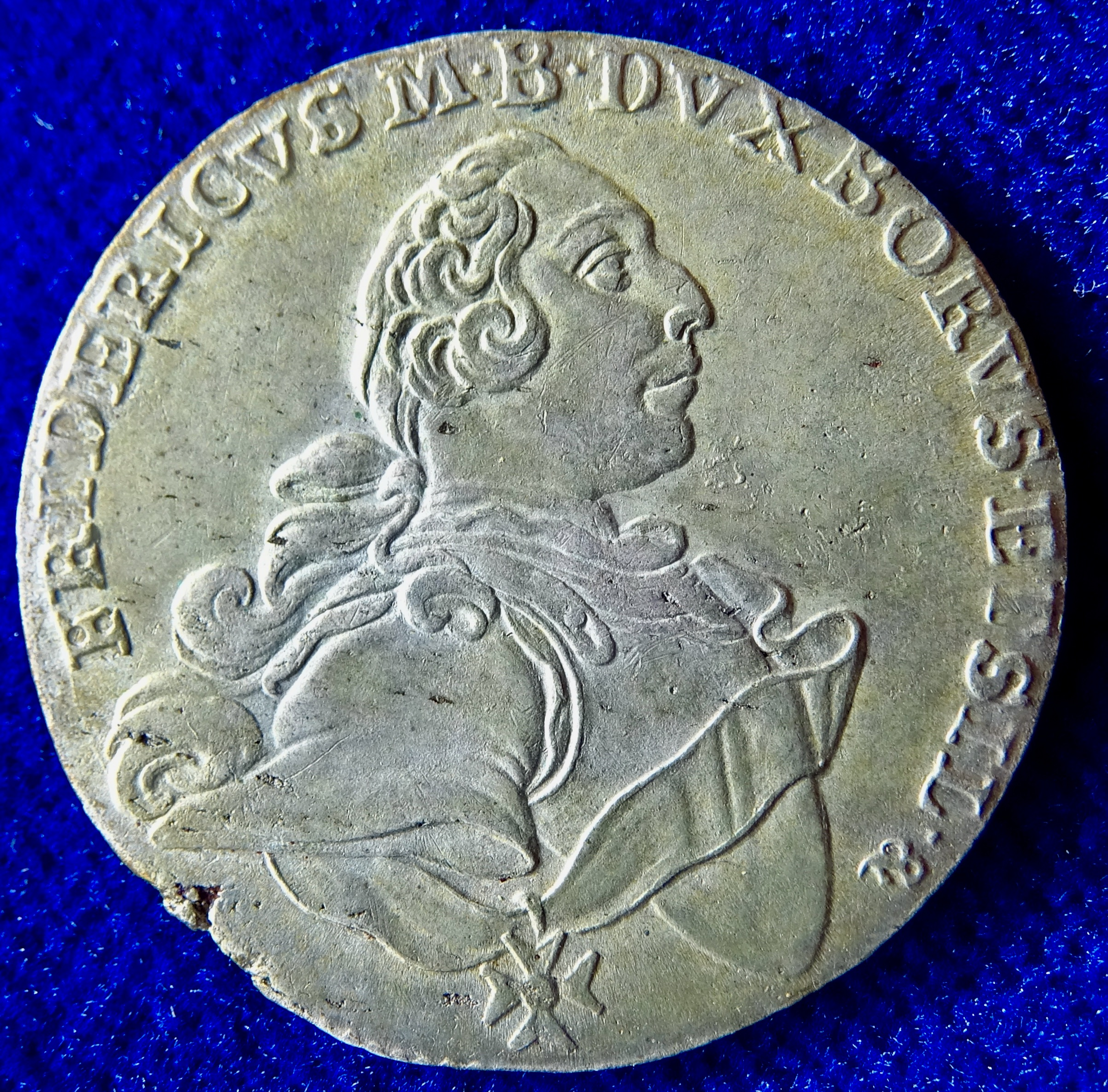
Ephraimit 1/6 Thaler 1757 from the Southern German State Brandenburg-Bayreuth, obverse

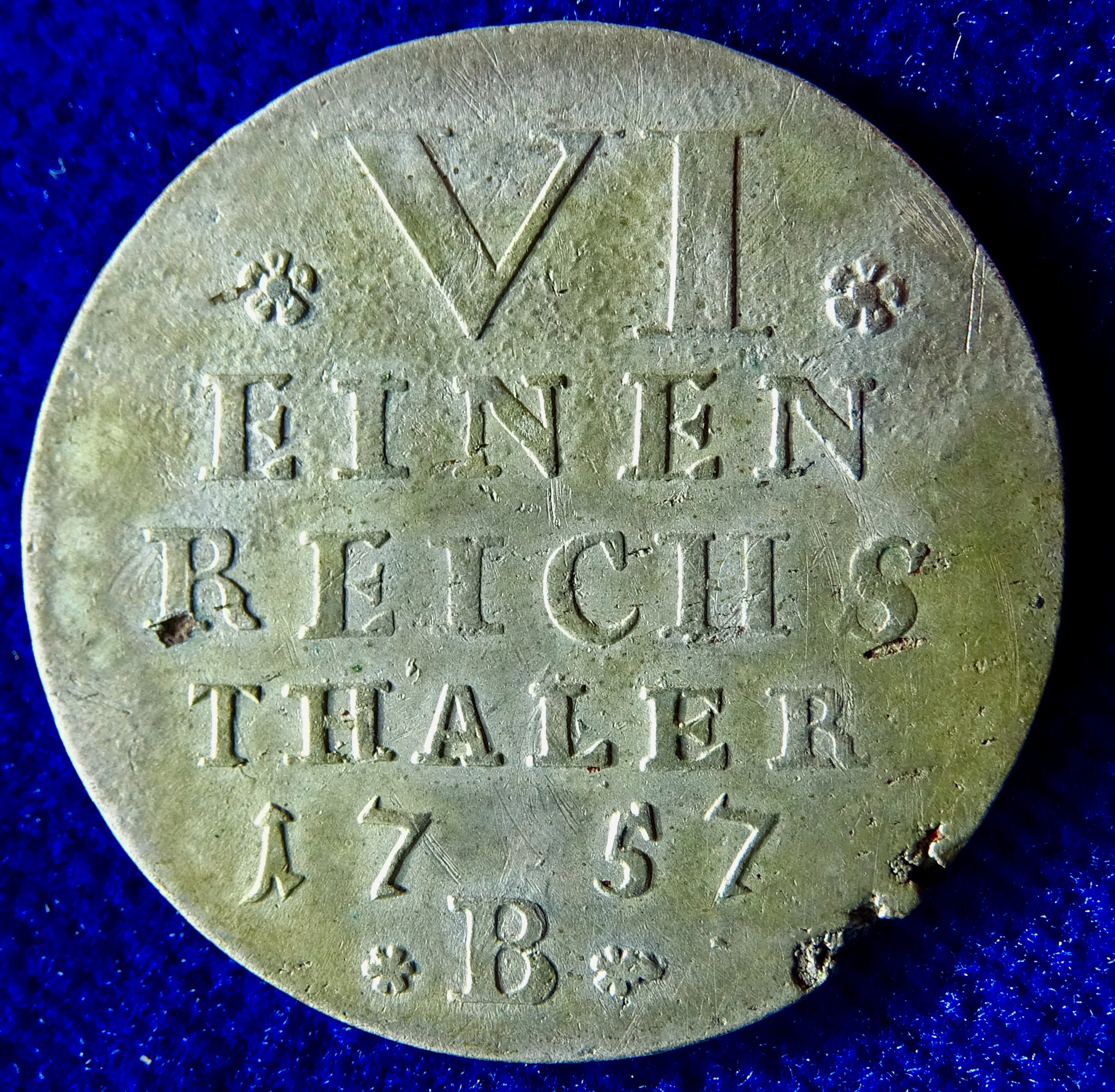
The reverse of this silver coin of secretly reduced fineness

An Ephraimite (German Ephraimit, plural Ephraimiten) was a debased coin part of whose silver content was replaced with copper. Ephraimites, as they came to be called, were issued under the authority of Frederick the Great of Prussia in the Electorate of Saxony and the Kingdom of Prussia from 1756 till 1763 during the Third Silesian War (part of the Seven Years' War). The coins were spread by merchants and soldiers in Silesia, Bohemia, Poland and Courland and traded as if they were of official silver content. In return higher value foreign coins would be received, which could be used to pay the costs of army supply. By the end of 1762 Frederick the Great abandoned this policy. After the war the traditional content standards were restored.

== Financing the cost of war ==
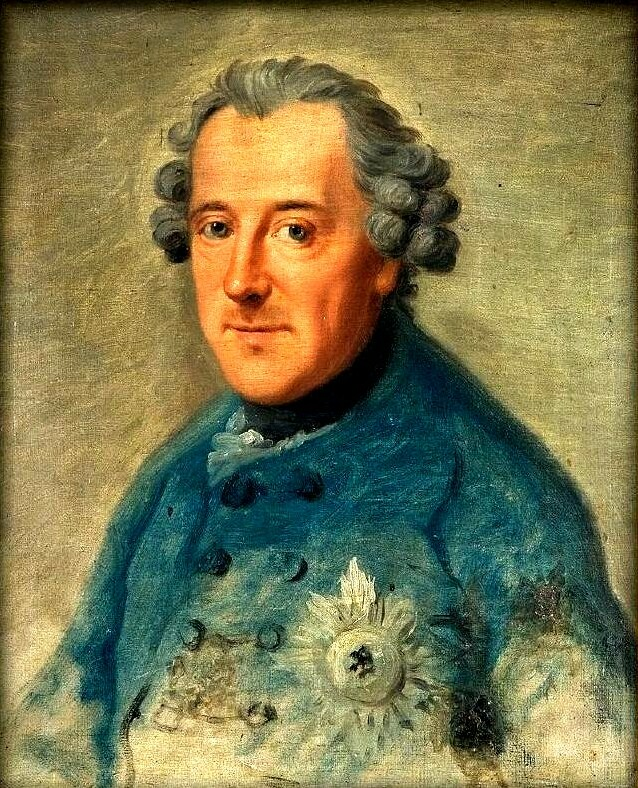
Frederick II in 1763, portrait by Johann Georg Ziesenis

Frederick the Great used Ephraimites to finance the Kingdom of Prussia's involvement in the Third Silesian War (part of the Seven Years' War). He debased the currency five times. By producing and issuing such coins of low value the royal treasury could make a considerable profit. This was mainly the task of the banker and court Jew Veitel-Heine Ephraim (1703–1775) and the debased coins were called after him, "Ephraimiten".

The financial gain was that the content of gold and silver was significantly lower than official levels, and large amounts of silver were replaced by inferior copper. However, the coins were put into circulation with their full value and accordingly yielded large profits to the Royal Treasury.

The original coin stamps came from the mint of the Electorate of Saxony. These Saxon coin stamps mainly dated back before 1756 and became available to the Prussian state when it occupied Saxony in the early stages of the Third Silesian War. In Leipzig the entrepreneurs Ephraim, Itzig and company produced vast masses of low-valued money, in tympfs, and in six-, three- and (most often) eight-groschen pieces. At first they used Saxon stamps found in 1753 and later on newly produced casts of the Saxon type. Recipients could not identify the inferior value of the coin at first sight, as coin stamps were in use that had produced full-value coins before the war. Ephraimite five thaler coins differed from true ones in their size and colour: they were thicker and had a reddish colour. As the weight had to be correct in the era of coinbalances and copper has a more than 50% lower specific weight, this led to the unusual thickness of the coins to reach the "mandatory" weight. The fraud was not as easy to identify by thickness in the case of the silver coins, since the specific weight of copper is only 15% lower than that of silver. Citizens initially accepted the "Ephraimiten" according to the (pre-war) face value, to discover that better informed traders would not accept this money at such value.

From 1757 even Prussian 1/6 thaler coins were significantly reduced in fineness by Prussia without official announcement. There are Prussian full copper counterfeits of the 1/6 thaler piece from this time which were silver-coated only on the outside. This leads to the possible assumption that in the chaos of war there were also private counterfeiters at work.

The "Ephraimiten" could be at best called value-reduced currency coins, because they were not accepted at their full nominal value as were "Scheidemünzen" in World War I.

Coins reduced in fineness can easily be tested for their fineness. The real value of the "Ephraimiten" could be hence be detected by their gross weight. The fraud was successful for only three years, but due to the low number of qualified experts, it could last longer in rural than in urban areas.

A contemporary saying about the coins went like this:

Von außen schön, von innen schlimm,
Von außen Fritz, von innen Ephraim!

Translation:

Nice on the outside, bad inside,
Fritz on the outside, Ephraim inside!

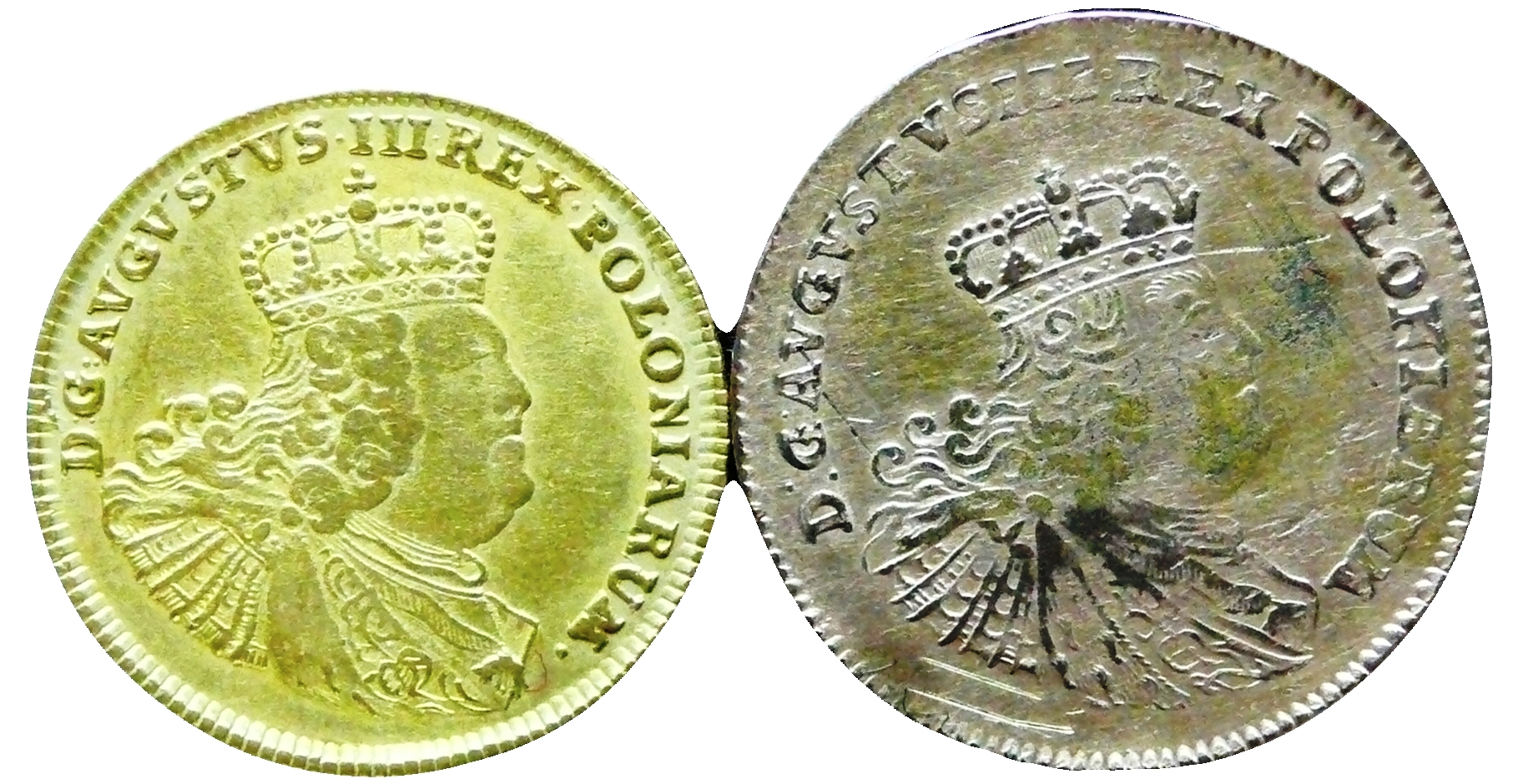
August d’or (1753–1756 Münzstätte Leipzig), a Saxon gold coin of 5 thalers, equal in value and weight to the Prussian Friedrich d'or

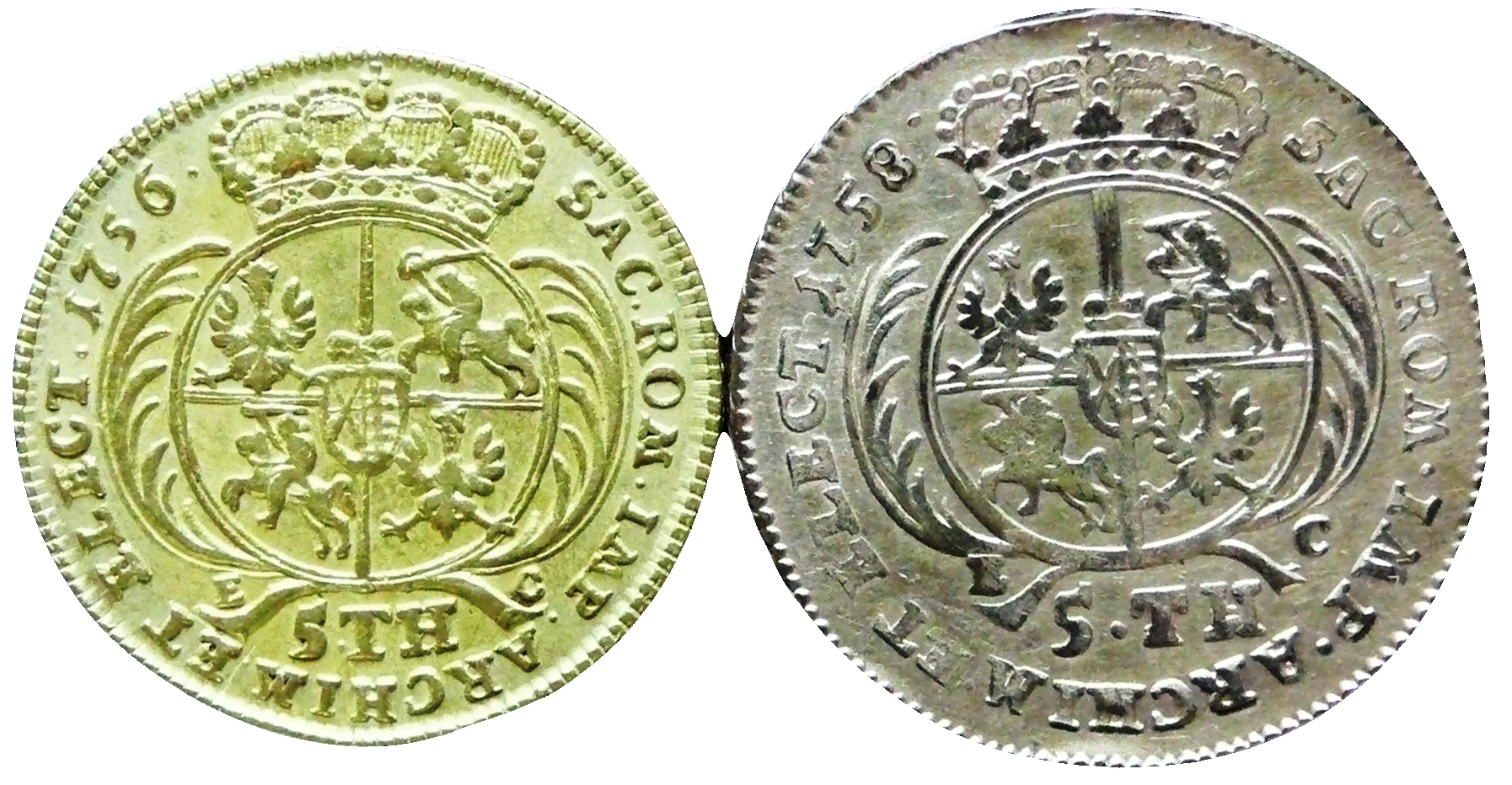
New August d’or (1761–1763 Münzstätte Berlin)

Frederick had to adjust his war finance after losing British support. Following the end of the war, the sub-value Prussian coins were quickly removed from circulation, and melted because of the relatively high silver content.

== Imitations ==
The Saxon-Polish eight groschen coin, the Polish 18 groschen coin (tympf) and the golden five thaler piece, also called August d'or, or, in German "goldener August", were reduced in fineness frequently.

These coins were copied in Prussia or at the mint in Leipzig. Afterwards they were reimported to Saxony as "trade coins" by the military. The coins were still negotiable in Prussia with reduced value until 1820. By law this was published in so called "Valvationstabellen" (=tables on coin value) and at the same time they were called in for definite change and elimination.

Examples for the "real value" of two pieces of five thaler coins (August d'or) from 1758 and the Tympf according to a Prussian value table from 1820:

- Two "middle August d'or" (nominal 10 talers) = six thalers, 21 groschen, six groschen (Prussian Courant), i.e. there was a difference of at least one and a half thalers to the nominal value per five thaler coin
- One eight groschen coin = three groschen (Prussian courant), i.e. a difference of five groschen (however, the Saxonian grosch was slightly higher in value than the Prussian)

After that other German treasurers in Anhalt-Bernburg, Mecklenburg, Swedish Pomerania, Saxe-Hildburghausen, Duchy of Württemberg, Principality of Ansbach, Principality of Bayreuth, Margraviate of Baden, Pfalz-Zweibrücken, Kurtrier, Fulda, etc. produced their own coins with less value, too. They were also called Ephraimiten. This was very obvious in the case of the 1/6 Thaler, Groschen and half-Groschen coins. These often were silvered on the outside only, e.g.- the coins of the Anhaltian principalities.

On 7 or 18 November 1761, Frederick forbade the use of foreign debased coins in Prussia and Saxony that were minted by Heinrich Carl von Schimmelmann in Rethwisch. In January 1762 L.P. De Neufville started to import and melt debased coins from Mecklenburg, Plön and Zerbst, expecting to sell the refined silver at a high price to Prussian merchants. De Neufville ordered 300 wagons of coins. In May 1762 De Neufville bought an estate outside Heemstede; he experimented with silver refining, but was not very successful, according to Johann Heinrich Müntz. In July 1763 the Russian senate insisted on being paid promptly; she demanded payment in Dutch guilders, and not in debased Saxon coins.

== See also ==
- Louis d'or
- Doubloon
