= Tympf =

Low-grade silver coin

The Tympf (rarely Timpf, Polish: tymf or tynf) was a low-grade silver coin used in Poland-Lithuania, Brandenburg-Prussia, and Russia in the 17th and 18th centuries.

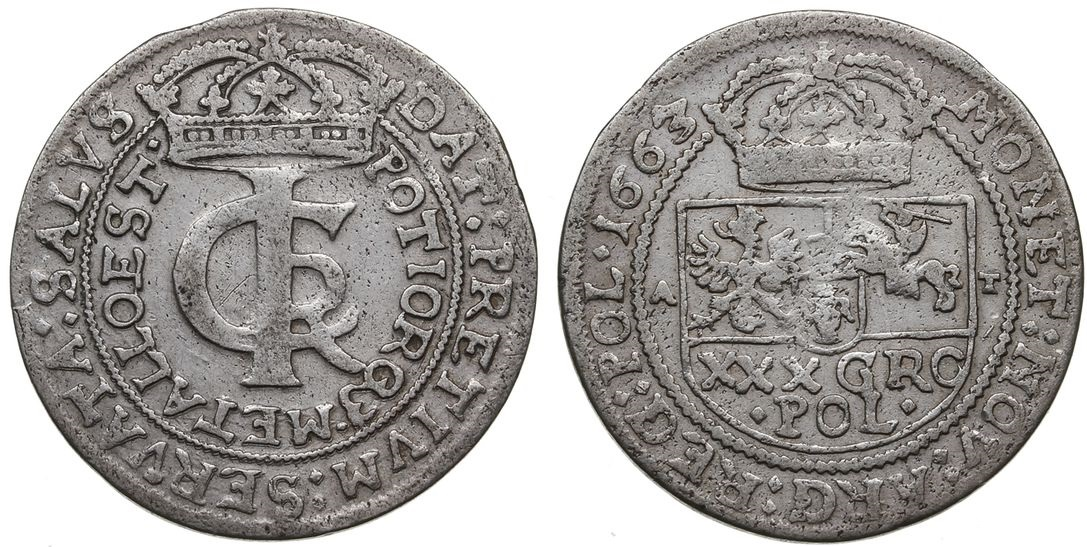
Tymf - złotówka 1663

== History ==
The coin was first struck in 1663 in Bromberg (present-day Bydgoszcz) in Polish Prussia by mint-master Andreas Tympf, for whom the coin takes its name. The nominal value was initially 30 groschen, but it soon dropped to 18 groschen due to the low silver content.

Tympfe were also minted in Brandenburg-Prussia from around 1685.

After the Electors of Saxony took over the Polish royal crown in 1688, many tympfe in the Leipzig mint were struck as 18-groschen pieces. The Prussian King Frederick II, who had conquered the city in the Seven Years' War, discontinued minting in 1765.

The Russian tsars minted tympfe in the Polish-Lithuanian territories they occupied from 1707 to 1709 during the Northern War and from 1759 to 1761 during the Seven Years' War.

There were other mints in Königsberg and Stettin.

After the partitions of Poland of 1772-1795, the coin was soon replaced by other currencies. A total of around six million of these coins were issued, fetching over two million guilders.

Because of its low value, especially in the years before the partition of Poland, the tympf was considered in Poland as a symbol of the poor state of the country. There is a saying: Dobry żart tymfa wart (A good joke is worth a tympf).

== Literature ==
Friedrich von Schrötter (ed.) with N. Bauer, K. Regling, A. Suhle, R. Vasmer, J. Wilcke: Dictionary of numismatics. De Gruyter, Berlin 1970 (reprint of the original 1930 edition). p. 247
