= Bank of Amsterdam =

Early (Dutch) bank

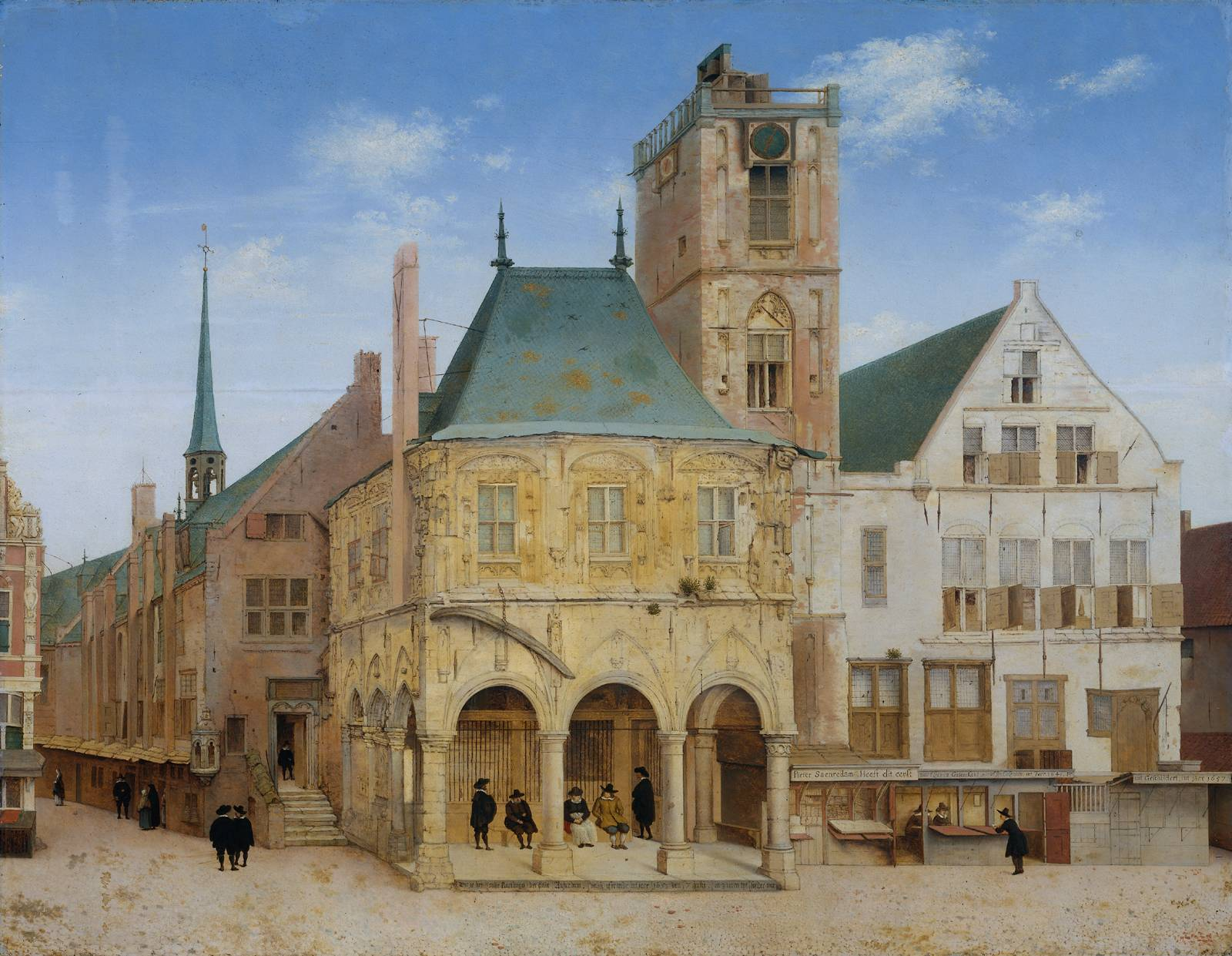
The old town hall in Amsterdam with the Wisselbank to the right of the tower. Painting by Pieter Saenredam

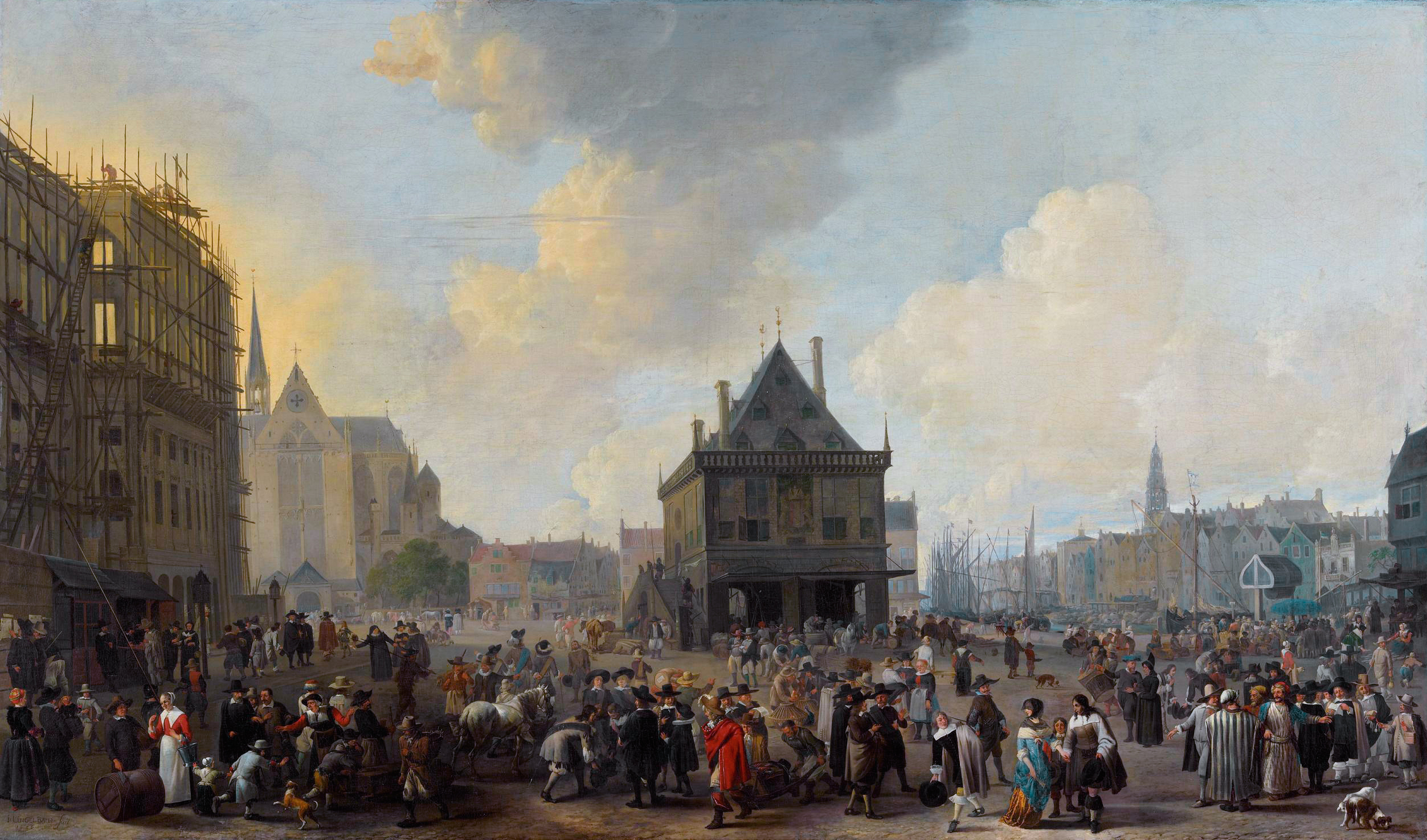
Dam square and town hall in 1656 with the Wisselbank in the lower left by Johannes Lingelbach

The Bank of Amsterdam or Wisselbank (Dutch: Amsterdamsche Wisselbank, lit. 'Exchange Bank of Amsterdam') was an early bank, vouched for by the city of Amsterdam, and established in 1609. It was the first public bank to offer accounts not directly convertible to coin. As such, it has been described by some as the first true central bank, even though that view is not uniformly shared. (Note: A similar claim has been made for the Taula de canvi de Barcelona, established two centuries earlier.) The Amsterdam Wisselbank was also active in the production of coins. For decades the assay master of the Bank sent out stocks of gold and silver to the various Mints in the United Netherlands to receive new coins in return.

Unlike the Bank of England, established almost a century later, it neither managed the national currency nor acted as a lending institution (except to the government in emergencies); it was intended to defend coinage standard. The role of the Wisselbank was to correctly estimate the value of coins and thus make debasement less profitable. It occupied a central position in the financial world of its day, providing an effective, efficient and trusted system for national and international payments, and the Dutch guilder was a de facto reserve currency in Europe in the 17th and 18th century. David Hume praised the Bank of Amsterdam for its policy of 100 percent specie-backed deposit reserves.

The bank's full-reserve policy relaxed over time as it lent money to finance overseas trade and to support the Dutch economy, but it remained liquid by requiring good collateral on its loans. This changed with the Fourth Anglo-Dutch War, when the Dutch East India Company defaulted on large unsecured advances from the bank. Despite several attempts to recapitalize, confidence in the bank never recovered. During the last decade of the Republic of the United Provinces, in 1790, the premium on the bank's money disappeared, and by the end of the year, it had declared itself insolvent. The City of Amsterdam assumed control of the bank in 1791. The Nederlandsche Bank was established in 1814, and took over money issue duties for the new Kingdom of the Netherlands, while the Wisselbank entered liquidation in 1819.

== Tasks ==
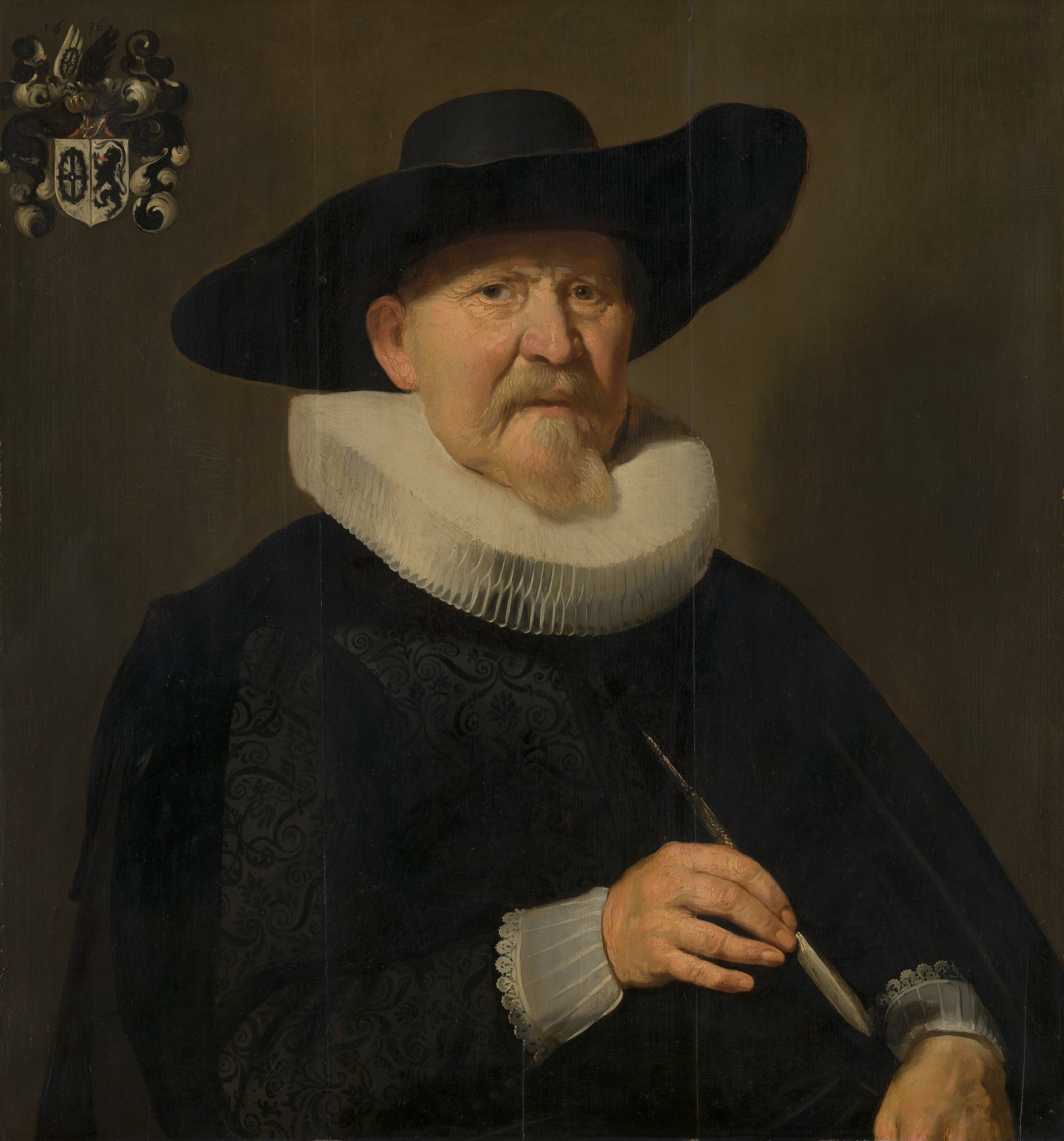
Portrait of the assayer Hans van Hogendorp, by Thomas de Keyser (1636).

Established on 31 January 1609, the Bank of Amsterdam played a pivotal role in the 17th and 18th-century financial center of Amsterdam. 500 different coins – legal or illegal – from a wide variety of countries and regions circulated, but a good system to determine exchange rates did not exist. At the bank, people could exchange their coins for fully-fledged and widely accepted trade currencies. The Wisselbank protected foreign creditors by settling debts through the bank and offering depositors its own coins that were not debased.

The bank was given a fourfold task:

1. to ensure that the money entrusted by the merchants to the bank remained stable in value
2. to solve their domestic payment problem
3. to facilitate their international payments through an adequate supply of full-value gold and silver coins and a good book-entry transfer system
4. to ensure that the bank's foreign exchange reserves were protected from the influx of lighter currencies.

The management of the Bank of Amsterdam was in the hands of three, later four commissioners elected by the city council. They were often former schepenen or members of the city council. Two of the commissioners had to be present daily at the office: they had the oversight of four accountants, two clerks with one servant, four counter bookkeepers, three receivers together with another servant, ushers and an assayer (assay-master), who knew the secrets of trade in precious metals and minting. (Note: On 27 Nov 1635 Hans van Hogendorp was appointed assayer of the Wisselbank in Amsterdam as successor of the late Meynert Caspers who had previously been mint master in Emden. He appears to have as servant Siewert Jansz., who would succeed him after his death as assayer of the Wisselbank.) Each of the accountants had his own specific task: the first took the written orders for payment receipt, the second held in the journal, the third balanced the book, and the fourth took care of the ledger. In 1715 there were five and a year later six commissioners, the number the bank kept until the end of the eighteenth century. From the beginning till the end of the 18th century the average age of commissioners dropped from 46 to 33 years. Two-thirds of the commissioners were merchants or bankers – which the other account holders trusted. Some of the commissioners had ties with the Dutch East India Company (13%) or the West India Company (15%), both account holders. (Note: Pieter Trip (1724–1786) became bookkeeper at the age of 18, chief bookkeeper of the exchange bank at 21; from 1764 he served as administrator of the VOC.) Whoever did business with the VOC was obliged to do so via this Wisselbank [which always resulted in large turnovers].

=== Units of account ===
Rijksdaalder of the Dutch Republic, 1622

The main objective of the Wisselbank's establishment was to maintain a stable silver bank currency for the Dutch Republic's burgeoning international trade which was immune from the numerous depreciations which occurred after its independence from Spain, as its constituent provinces kept wringing out more stuivers (worth 1/20 guilder) from a fixed quantity of silver. After 1618, it was able to fix the Dutch rijksdaalder of 25.4 g fine silver at 2 1/2 Dutch guilders or 50 stuivers, guaranteeing a payout of 10.16 g fine silver for each bank gulden deposited.

While initially successful in halting the depreciation of the Dutch currency, the Wisselbank was tested from the 1630s, when the provinces tried to further raise the gulden equivalent of coins imported from the southern Spanish Netherlands: the patagon of 24.55 g silver raised from 48 to 50 stuivers (or 9.82 g per gulden), and later on the ducaton of 30.69 g silver from 60 to 63 stuivers (or 9.74 g per gulden).

Fearing the loss of its Europe-wide reputation if 2.5-gulden rijksdaalders were repaid with cheaper 2.5-gulden patagons, the Wisselbank firmly upheld the original gulden banco of 10.16 g fine silver as distinct from the lower-valued circulating gulden: so the bank accepted the patagon only at 48 stuivers, and the ducaton at 60.

In 1659, the Dutch Republic issued its own versions of the Spanish Netherlands coins, the silver ducat (patagon) of 24.36 g fine silver and the silver rider (ducaton) of 30.45 g fine silver, worth respectively 50 and 62.5 stuivers as currency, and 48 and 60 stuivers in the Wisselbank: hence, 9.67 g per gulden currency and 10.15 g per gulden banco (5% premium or agio) as computed from the ducaton.

From 1683, the Wisselbank introduced a system of receipts with the gulden banco's agio allowed to float at 4 to 5% subject to supply and demand for banco vs currency. Both types of gulden were on the silver standard, with gold coins and bars quoted at fluctuating exchange rates. (Note: Japan reduced export of silver after 1640; in Old Batavia there was a lack of coins. The flow of silver into the Ottoman Empire dried up, and local mints closed. India became more silver-hungry than ever. Russia restricted the export of coins to Persia; local mints closed.)

Lucien Gillard calls it the European guilder (le florin européen), and Adam Smith devoted many pages to explaining how the bank guilder worked.

=== Seventeenth century ===
The modern practice of corporate governance has its roots in the 17th-century Dutch Republic. The first recorded corporate governance dispute in history took place in 1609, between the shareholders/investors (most notably Isaac Le Maire) and the directors of the Dutch East India Company (VOC), the world's first formally listed public company. In 1609, and 1611, Le Maire was the most important account holder at the Wisselbank. Between 1611 and 1620, the number of account holders in the Wisselbank grew from 708 to 1,202. In 1622, it was forbidden to trade in gold and silver without the authorization of the bank. After the Treaty of Bärwalde in 1631, France transferred its financial support to the Swedish army with the help of Jean Hoeufft and the Wisselbank.

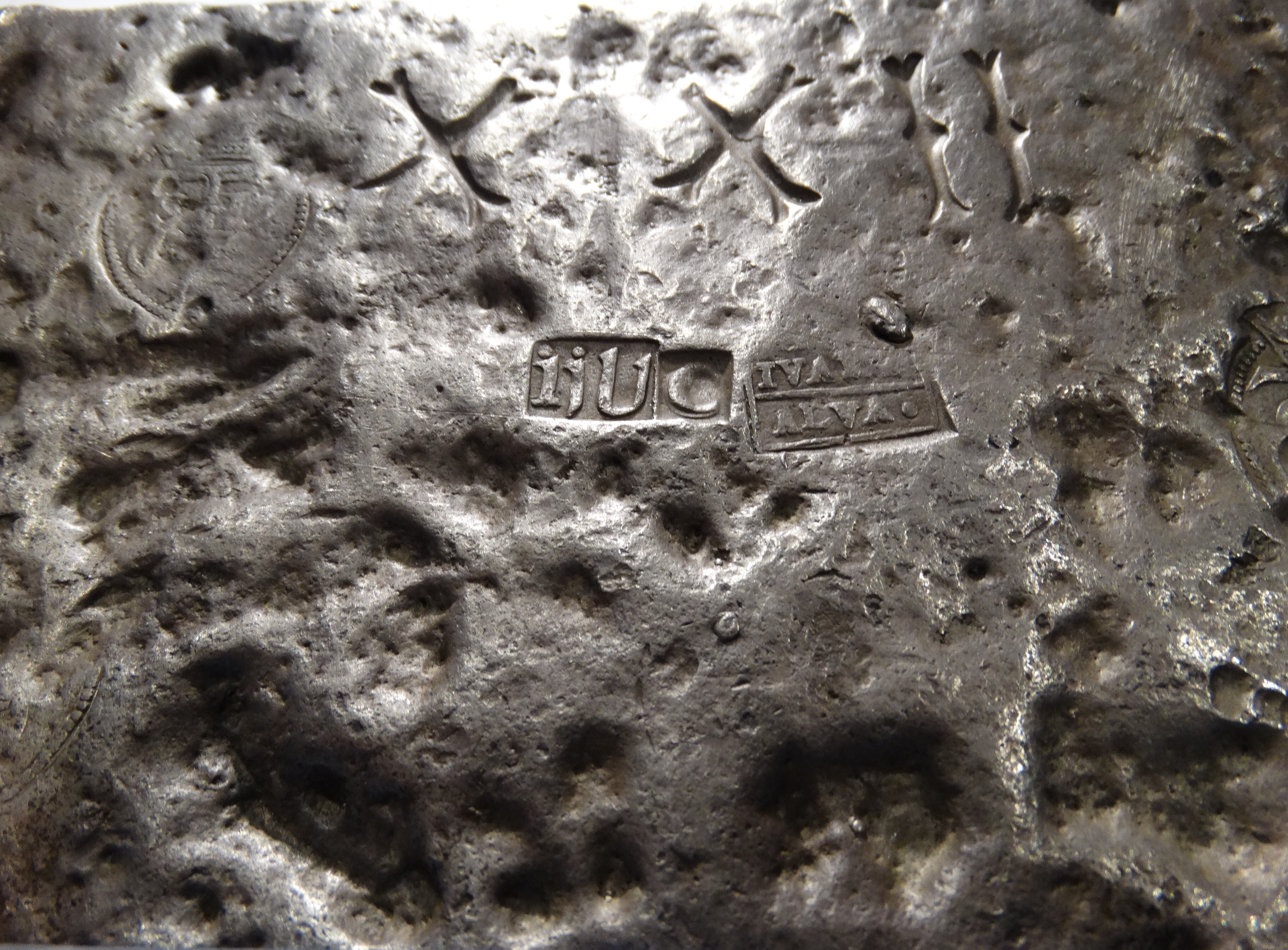
Detail of 16-pound silver bar, probably from the mines of Potosí

The city of Amsterdam, which owned the bank and guaranteed the deposits, derived from it a considerable revenue, but was responsible for the losses too. (Note: Mees calculated the total revenue of the city from this source between 1609 and 1796 at 12,256,000 guilders. Rapport van de committés van koophandel en zeevaart, en van financiën, ... betreffende stads wisselbank estimated 13 million gulden.) The bank seems to have hardly supported the Dutch West India Company; but in 1637, the Stadsbank van Lening did so. It provided the Admiralty of Amsterdam and the mint masters in Enkhuizen, Harderwijk, Kampen, Medemblik, Zwolle and Utrecht with funds booked as private loans. In 1645, for which year ledgers of the Wisselbank are available, the firm Coymans was the largest account holder at the bank with a turnover of over 4 million guilders. In July 1647, more than half a year before the conclusion of the peace treaty in Münster, the Spanish government made a proposal aimed at making Amsterdam the staple market for Spanish silver. In October the States General decided to authorize the admiralties to issue passports for the export of silver imported from Spain, Andries Bicker was involved in the request. Amsterdam became a recognized staple market for Spanish silver from the New World.

After the Treaty of Münster between Spain and the Dutch Republic, a lot of silver from Cádiz and Potosí arrived in Amsterdam. From the beginning, the bank had to supply the provincial and the various local mints with silver. While trading silver in stock was formally prohibited, its allure stemmed from the silver standard in place. (All countries of Europe began to issue large-size silver coins.) In 1652, the Wisselbank made no profit. In a fire in the town hall, many coins melted and had to be cleaned; the bank was temporarily moved to the Jan Roodenpoorts tower. In 1654 quite a few people (10%) were in debt to the Wisselbank after the First Anglo-Dutch War. In 1666, Jan de Neufville (1613–1663) and the Coymans company both deposited sums exceeding 3.5 million guilders with the Wisselbank. From 1666 the Wisselbank is quite actively purchasing millions of silver. In August 1672, the bank was stormed by private account holders who wanted to withdraw their money. Johan Huydecoper, Joan Geelvinck, and his father Cornelis Geelvinck were commissioners in the year of disaster. In the following year the Wisselbank booked a loss.

On 17 August 1657, the bank began to advance money on loan to the East India Company. (Note: From 1652 to 1658 Gerrit Reynst, the son of Gerard Reynst (the second Governor-General of the Dutch East Indies), was commissioner. Hendrick Reynst was commissioner between 1633-1648) Silver coins such as the rijksdaalder and the coveted Spanish dollar were in high demand in Old Batavia, prized on the Spice Islands, and sought after in Southeast Asia, ultimately proving to be lucrative exports. At first, the city had to give special permission for each loan. Later on, loans were made easier, and by decree of 5 October 1682, the East India Company could at any time have at its disposal 1,700,000 bank guilders. (Note: In 1682 three managers of the VOC were appointed as consultants: Johannes Hudde, Johan Munter and Jan de Vries.) In 1683, Christoffel van Swoll was appointed as governor-general of the East Indies; he had good connections as his father was an attendant (usher?) of the bank between 1656 and 1678. The Qing dynasty became somewhat more receptive to foreign trade after gaining control of Taiwan in 1683 following its conquest. Until then few people in China were engaged in coastal and foreign trade, but soon Batavia (and Manila) would become a popular destination for Chinese merchants.

=== Introduction of a system of receipts in 1683 ===
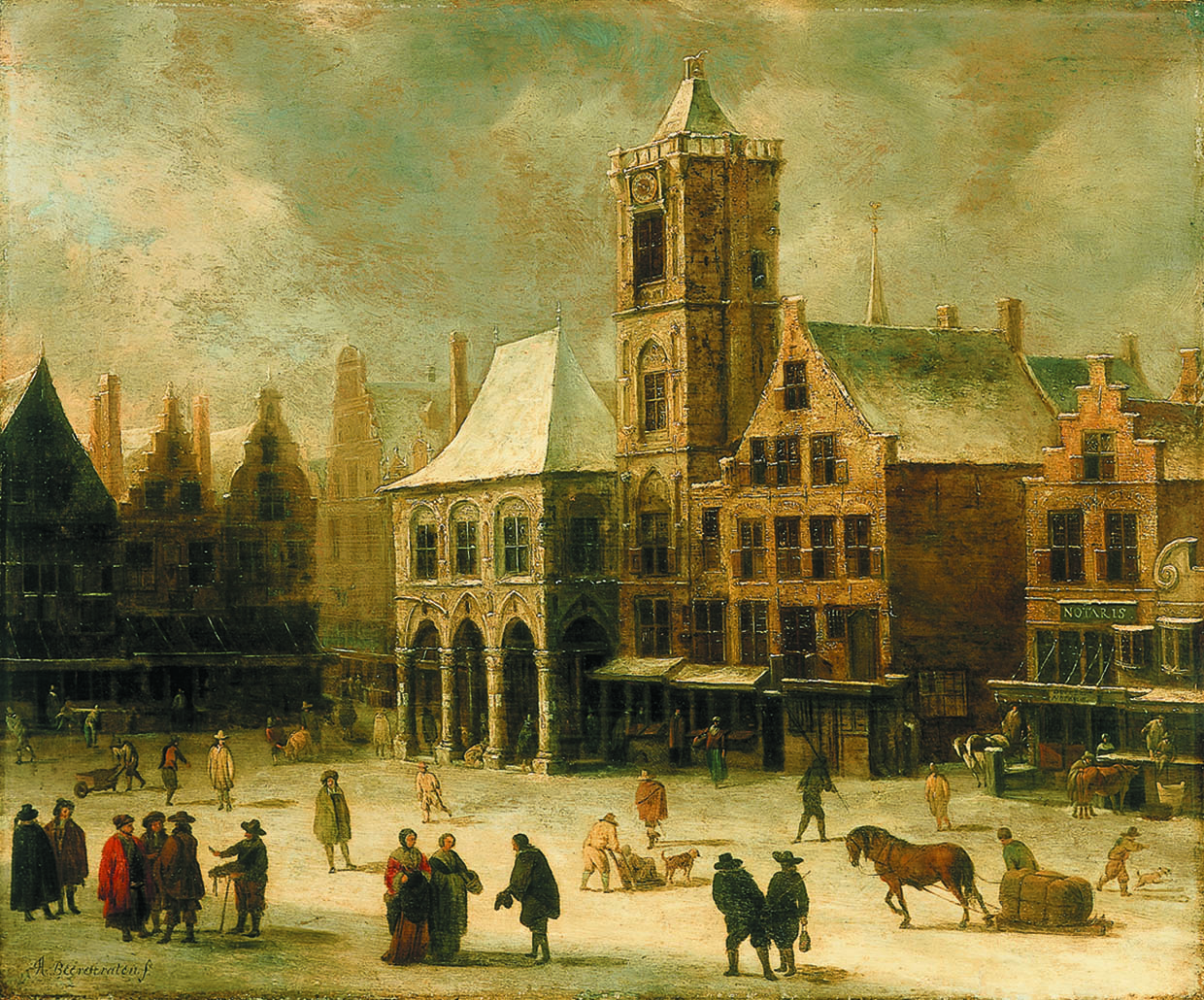
View of Dam Square with the old town hall by Jan Abrahamsz Beerstraaten

The depositor received a "récépissé" drawn on the bearer, entitling him to take out the money deposited, at any time within six months, upon paying one-eighth percent, and upon re-depositing in the bank that amount of bank money which was credited to him when the deposit was made. This receipt system had been adopted in Amsterdam for a short time in 1638, and 1656; after 1683, it proved permanent. If anyone wished to have a certain kind of coin from the bank, he had only to buy a receipt.

The receipts offered the bank the potential of a new means of competition in the international struggle for precious metal supplies. The receipts enabled account holders to cover themselves ... to systematically hedge against the market's volatility. The Bank of Amsterdam introduced a form of fiat money that successfully competed with the coinage of the time. After 1683, the bank was able to conduct more regular and aggressive policy interventions, from a virtually nonexistent capital base.

By a decree of 16 April 1684, the bank commissioners secured the monopoly of the trade in silver and silver coins. The few exceptions made here were in favor of goldsmiths and silversmiths and merchants, who received the metal from foreign countries. The export of uncoined metal was allowed only when accompanied by a certificate given by the bank commissioners. These and many other orders were found insufficient to suppress private trade in precious metals, or private changing at Amsterdam.

In October 1686, Spain devalued silver by about 20% and adopted a dual coinage standard (plata nueva and plata vieja). In 1688, the profits of the Wisselbank dropped considerably, and they did not recover for more than a decade. In 1689, Albert Geelvinck took a seat on the city council, the Dutch West India Company, the Society of Suriname and as commissioner at the Wisselbank; his brother Joan Geelvinck (1644–1707), the former commissioner, became manager of the VOC. In 1693, Joan Huydecoper, one of the Heren XVII, succeeded his brother-in-law Joan Coymans as commissioner. Cornelis Bors van Waveren, a manager of the WIC and of the Society of Suriname, was appointed as commissioner. Around 1700, the top 25 account holders were generating nearly 25% of the business. More and more, the European trade in precious metals concentrated in Amsterdam.

Amsterdam's combination of steady exchange rates, absence of capital controls, and low interest rates allowed its markets to flourish, and conferred something of a "reserve currency" status on the bank florin. Bills of exchange drawn on Amsterdam were a liquid form of short-term credit readily available in most European commercial cities. The bank florin was a reference unit of account for commercial transactions over much of Europe, and top-quality bills payable through the Bank were a reliable and liquid store of value.

=== Eighteenth century ===
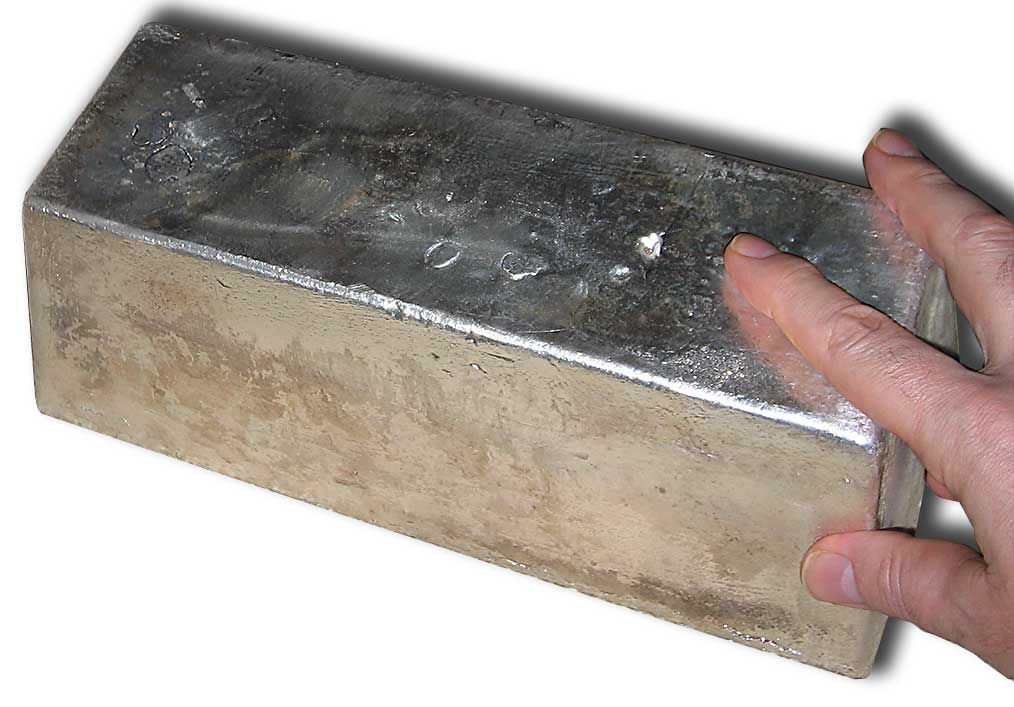
A silver ingot

The annual production of silver hardly changed between 1660 and 1720. It grew steadily, with some lapses, in the 1730s and 1740s, as more a recent study shows. After a hundred years the annual production of silver doubled between 1761 and 1780, according to William Arthur Shaw. The bank's metal stock was increased by large purchases at favorable times or by offering higher prices than the competition.

Following the Spanish War of Succession, Spanish mints inundated Spain with devalued silver. The debts incurred by King Louis XIV of France also contributed to a scarcity of both silver and gold. Consequently, John Law introduced paper money, which remained in circulation until his adversaries attempted a widespread conversion of their notes into precious metals. In 1721, the English and Dutch drew more money from Spain than France did. In 1721, there were 2,918 account holders, the highest number in two centuries of banking history. One of main bankers was Andries Pels, dealing with France as well as Great Britain. (Note: In 1715 the turnover of the firm of Pels & Sons at the Wisselbank was 21 million; 1725 26 million; 1736 20 million; in 1746 20 million; in 1755 20 million and in 1765 18 million.) Great Britain moved towards a gold standard (and drew out silver in the form of crowns, shillings and sixpences). Logically, this meant a flow of gold to England and a flow of silver to the Republic, where silver could be purchased relatively inexpensively for transportation to Asia. In Asia, silver fetched a higher price and thus represented more purchasing power there than in the Republic. The relative scarcity of silver in England and the silver glut in the Republic also explain why the English East India Company sought to satisfy its silver needs in the Amsterdam market.

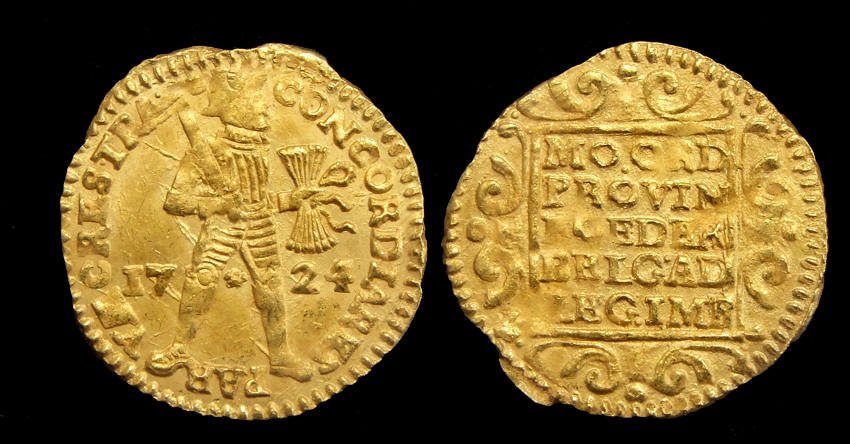
Netherlands, Utrecht, gold ducat 1724, recovered from the VOC ship Akerendam.

From 1713 onwards, the bank reported (Note: In a collective item on the profit and loss accounts) on their profits. (Note: At first assayers were allowed to keep 5% then 10% of the profit as provision.) After the Treaty of Utrecht, it took several more years before the bank's specie supply returned to a normal level, thanks to an increased supply of Spanish-American silver money. Around 1714/1715, the bank received many old French coins, like the gold pistole. In 1722, the total value of precious metals stored in the bank amounted to 26 million guilders. Pistoles were melted into ingots and sold at a profit. Until 1725, on average, nearly half of the bank profits were attributable to the activities of ten assayers. This was followed by a sharp increase in the supply of specie from Spain in the 1730s, until the impressive sum of over 15 million guilders was reached in January 1737. Unlike at the beginning of the 1720s, when French gold dominated the bank's total metal supply, by the middle of the century it consisted mainly of Spanish specie. The Spanish dollar superseded the gold ducat as the dominant currency of world trade.

The VOC obtained the specie required for its Asian trade from several sources. Spanish American reales de a ocho and, during the 1720s, ducatons were largely obtained from the Bank of Amsterdam, while other coins were ordered from Dutch mints. Silver bullion, however, was not supplied by the bank. The Amsterdam Chamber employed private assayers, including Johannes Grill, who also worked as an assayer for the Bank of Amsterdam. Between 1722 and 1731, Grill repeatedly supplied the chamber with silver bars, made principally from melted Spanish American reales de a ocho or "pieces of eight". The bars, stamped with the VOC monogram, weighed about 1.96 kg and contained approximately 98.7% silver.

Demand for European goods in Asia was insufficient to finance the VOC's substantial purchases, requiring large exports of silver and gold. The form in which specie was shipped varied according to destination, availability and price. Some silver bullion was reminted in Asia into locally accepted currencies such as rupees.

In 1729, Dutch traders were allowed in a neighborhood of Canton, then eight, later Thirteen Factories. Despite some restrictions, silver continued to drive trade through its popularity in Europe. This, combined with a high demand for Chinese tea, silk, cotton, and Chinese ceramics, created chronic trade deficits for European governments, which were forced to risk silver deficits to supply merchants in Asia. Between 1736 and 1745, the VOC borrowed almost f 50 million from the bank. The Wisselbank proved to be one of the most important sources for cash requirements in Asia. In the mid-eighteenth century 85 percent of VOC precious metal (gold and silver) went to India. This reduced the amount remaining in Europe. "The Bank of Amsterdam has for these many years past been the great warehouse of Europe for bullion, for which the receipts are very seldom allowed to expire, or, as they express it, to fall to the bank" as Adam Smith wrote. According to Nicholas Magens, the French and the Dutch gave more gold for silver than their neighbors.

Forged Dutch ducats secretly minted in their millions at the Saint Petersburg Mint became widely known from 1735. In 1746, the mint masters asked for strict measures to be taken with regard to all the bad small coins (or change); they were supported by the bankers and cashiers. In 1747, and 1750, Maria Theresa reduced the metal content of all her coins. The commissioners sanctioned, by the decree of 27 June 1749, the private trade in specie, and even ordered that the regulation of the values of the coins had to be fixed by commercial agreement. From 1750, Frederick the Great attracted precious metals, used for producing Prussian thalers with a reduced silver content, Friedrich d'or and fake coins in an attempt to compete with the Austrian and Dutch trade coin. The silver required for the minting of inferior money was largely obtained from Amsterdam and Hamburg. The mint masters in Prussia imported each year 100–200 tons of silver throughout the Seven Years' War, which was paid for in Amsterdam mainly by bills of exchange, and in Hamburg by Kriegsgeld." Part of it was used to mint 40 million new coins, which were put into circulation in Saxony and Silesia, but also in Hungary, Poland, Lithuania and Courland. In 1754, Ferdinand VI of Spain prohibited the circulation in America of all money coined in Spain; no doubt exchanging coins became an art.

In 1755, Essay on the Nature of Trade in General was published twenty years after the death of the author Richard Cantillon.

But as silver can be combined with Iron, Lead, Tin, Copper, etc. which are not such scarce Metals and are mined at less expense, the exchange of Silver was subject to much fraud, and this caused several Kingdoms to establish Mints to certify by a public coinage the true quantity of silver that each coin contains and to return to individuals who bring bars or ingots of Silver to it the same quantity in coins bearing a stamp or certificate of the true quantity of Silver they contain. The History of all times shows that when Princes have debased their money, keeping it at the same nominal value, all raw produce and manufacturers have gone up in price in proportion to the debasement of the coinage.

=== August 1763 ===
The Bank of Amsterdam shut twice a year (in January and July) for two weeks to balance its books; the account holders were expected to come and check their balance; for other business, they had to pay a fee. In 1763, the bank was closed from Friday 15 July until Friday 29 July. The financial crisis at the end of July 1763 was triggered when Leendert Pieter de Neufville had to pay his obligations to Johann Ernst Gotzkowsky. On Monday 1 August, the Wisselbank refused to transfer any money and De Neufville suspended payment the next day. The shocking failure of De Neufville caused the market to contract its lending to bankers; bankers to stop accepting bills; and creditors to stop lending on the security of bills. Their reaction caused financial contagion, a "run behaviour, whereby fears of widespread financial collapse lead to the withdrawal of funding from banks and other financial institutions." The immediate victims were a group of independent, private "cashiers". (The deposits in the Wisselbank were virtually unenforceable, but everyone was free to demand the money that he had entrusted to his cashier.) The deferrals resulted in an international banking crisis in Amsterdam (38 bankruptcies), Hamburg (90–97), Berlin (33), Danzig, Leipzig, Breslau, Stockholm, and London. The bankers became unwilling to extend credit to one another, so that the failure of Neufville led to a general loss of market funding. On 4 August, six prominent Amsterdam bankers proposed the idea of depositing their silver and gold bars at the Wisselbank, opting for this approach over using coins. On 5 August, the banks were closed and all bills drawn on Amsterdam were returned without acceptance or "protested". A run on the cashiers (bank tellers) followed on Saturday, 6 August. The Bank of Amsterdam and the Stadsbank van Lening were open until two o'clock that night to accept gold and silver, which had never happened before. The Bank of Amsterdam's improvised solution to the crisis was for the bank to expand its receipt window (much like a modern repo facility) to include unminted silver bullion, a form of collateral that was in abundant supply after the Prussian demonetization. The Wisselbank introduced a new lending window that accepted bullion between 4–15 August. The amount of bullion went up in the next few weeks. After the Seven Years' War the stock of precious metals held by the Wisselbank was never as large as in the years 1763–1765, that is, 31 million guilders, of which no less than 25 million were made up of Spanish specie, and sent from Hamburg. In the course of the 18th century, English and French competition on the Cádiz trade increased considerably so that the Dutch merchants, who used to occupy the first place, were pushed back to the third place. In January 1773, after the credit crisis of 1772, the Wisselbank funded a city-operated loan facility for distressed merchants.

== Deposits of bullion and coin ==
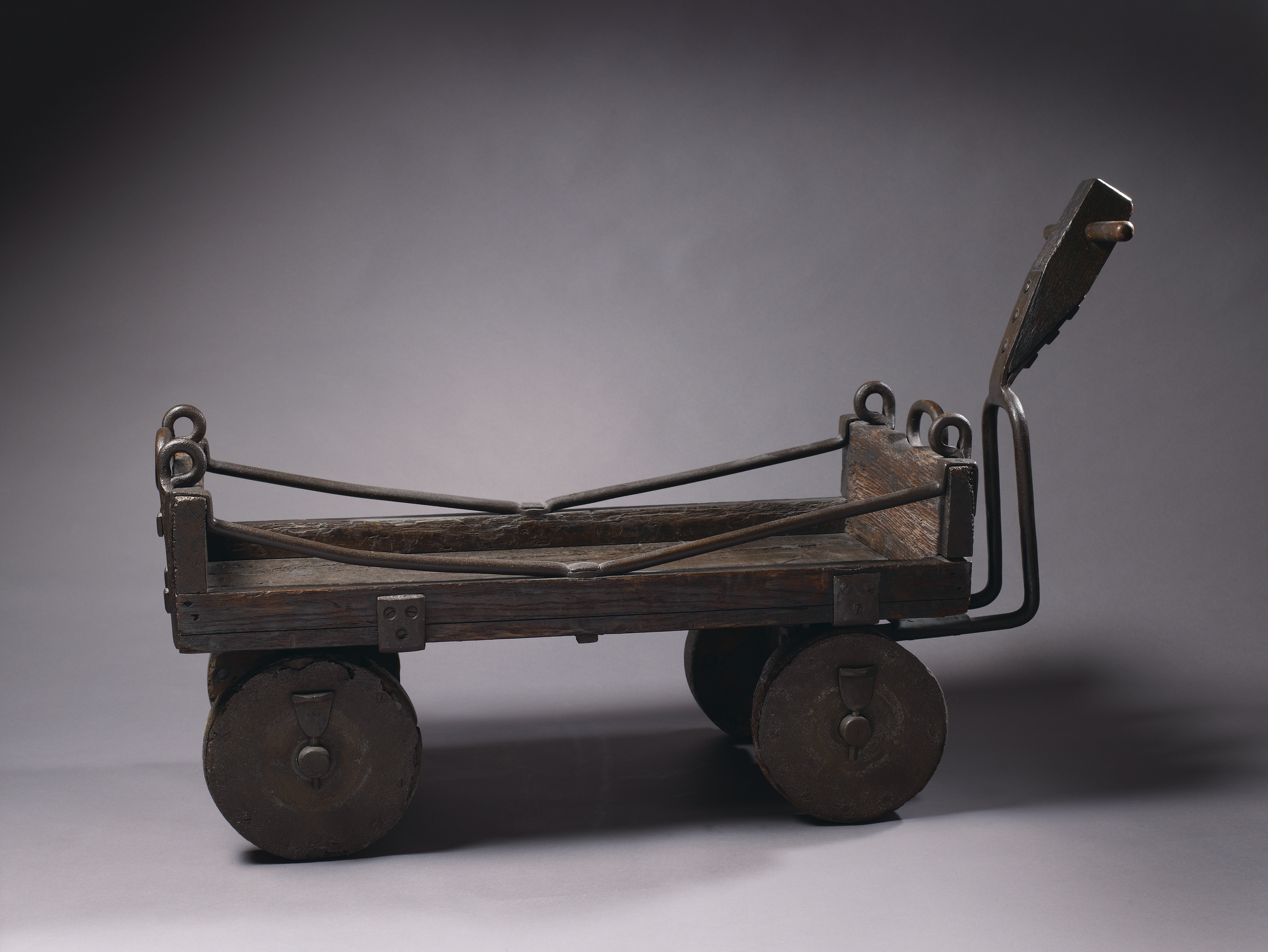
Money wagon of the Amsterdam Wisselbank

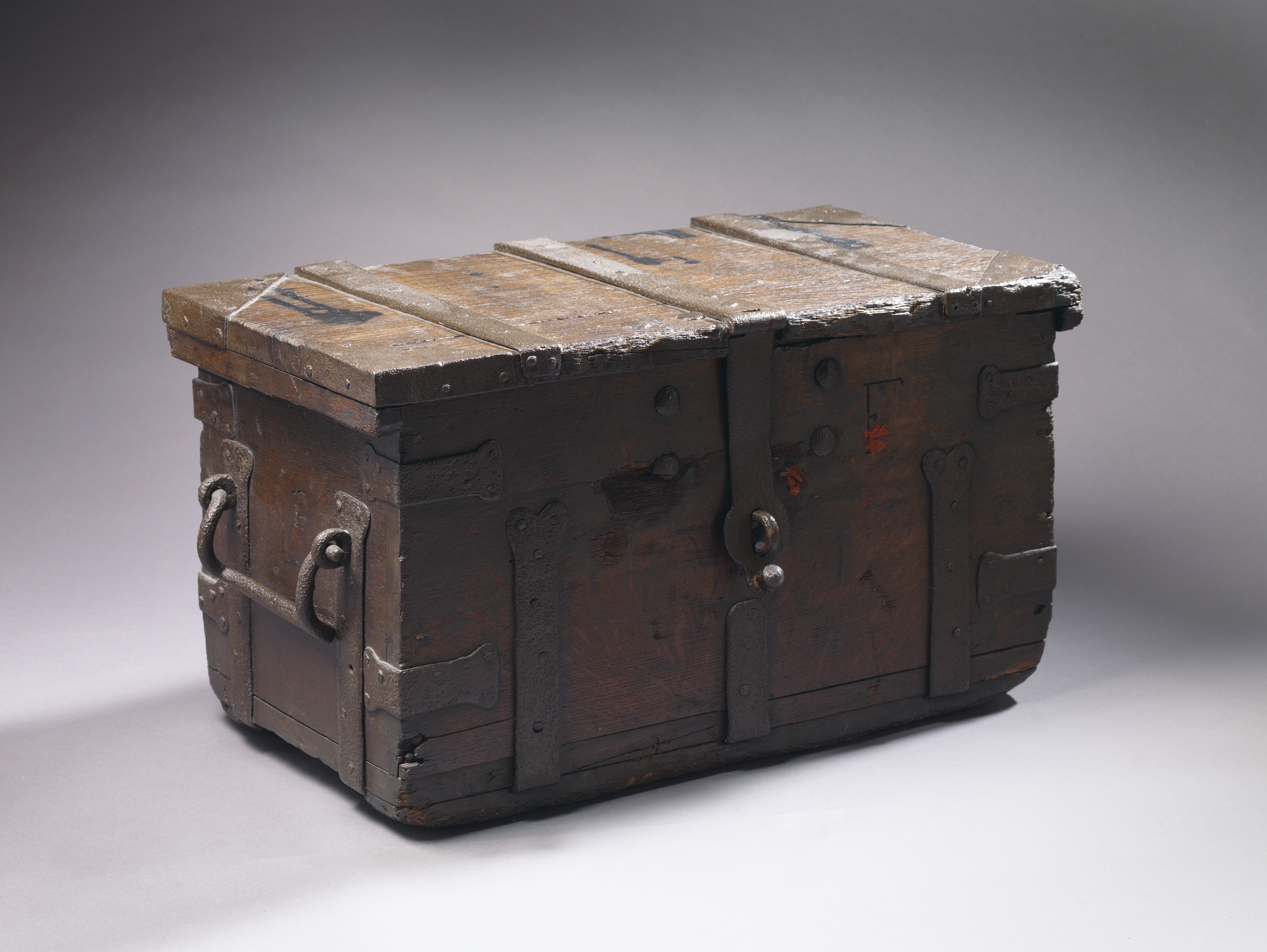
Cash box of the Amsterdam Wisselbank

Deposits of coin constituted but a small part of bank capital. Most of the bank's capital originated from deposits of gold and silver bullion, intrinsically of higher value as bullion was not debased, unlike most of the circulating coinage.

The Bank of Amsterdam gave credit for deposits of gold and silver worth about 5% less than their mint price. It granted the depositor a "receipt", which allowed him to claim his deposit within 6 months, upon returning to the bank the same value of bank money for which credit had been given, and payment of a fee for the keeping —a warehouse rent of sorts— of 0.25% for silver, and 0.5% for gold. This fee could be paid every six months, extending the deposit period. Fees were higher for gold since the bank's unit of account was fixed to silver, with gold fluctuating in price. If a depositor did not claim his deposit back after six months, it fell to the bank, and the depositor was left with the credit he received in compensation.

The terms of deposit were such that deposits of bullion were most commonly made when the price was somewhat lower than usual, and taken out again when it rose. The ratios of the bank price (the credit that the bank gave for deposits of bullion) to the mint price, and to the market price of bullion were always nearly the same. A person could generally sell his receipt for the difference between the mint price of bullion and the market price. As a receipt was nearly always worth something, it was only rarely that deposits were allowed to fall to the bank through the expiration of receipts (which means the depositor neither paid additional keeping fees nor removed his deposit from the bank). This happened more frequently with regard to gold, due to its higher storage fee.

The bank also took in coin, granting credit and receipts in exchange, and charging 0.25% for the storage. These receipts were often of no value, however, and the deposit was allowed to fall to the bank.

The bank maintained that it did not lend onwards any of the bullion deposited in it, not even that part for which the receipts expired, and which could not generally be claimed.

The Bank accepted trade coins, foreign and domestic coins. It did not accept local coins.

== Receipts ==
Based on Adam Smith's The Wealth of Nations, and obliged to Henry Hope: When a holder of a receipt found himself in need of coinage, he could sell his receipt. Alternatively, when a holder of bank money found himself in need of bullion, he could buy a receipt. Receipts and credit were thus freely bought and sold. When a holder of a receipt wished to take out the bullion for which it stood, he had to purchase enough bank credit to do so. The holder of a receipt, when he purchased bank money, purchased the power of taking out a quantity of bullion, denominated in bank guilder which had a 5% premium or agio versus the circulating guilder; this receipt may trade at a slightly different market agio reflecting supply and demand for bank receipts versus coin.

The bank allowed no withdrawal except by means of a receipt. There was, however, more bank money available than the combined value of all receipts – because some receipts have been allowed to expire, but the bank money, or credit, remained in the bank's books. In times of peace, a client who wished to withdraw his deposit had no trouble purchasing a receipt and making a withdrawal. In times of distress, however, as during the French invasion in 1672, the price of receipts could be pushed upwards by demand.

== Bank fees ==
Based on The Father of Economics Adam Smith's The Wealth of Nations: While this was not its original aim, the Bank of Amsterdam proved profitable to the city which provided for it. In addition to the keeping fee mentioned above, each person, upon first opening an account, paid a fee of ten guilders; and three guilders three "stuivers" for each additional account. Two stuivers (or 1/10 guilder) were paid for each transaction, excepting those of less than three hundred guilders, for which six stuivers were paid, to discourage a high volume of small transactions. A person who neglected to balance his account twice in the year forfeited twenty-five guilders. A person who ordered a transfer for more than was upon his account was obliged to pay 3% for the sum overdrawn. The bank made a further profit by selling foreign coin and bullion which fell to it by the expiration of receipts, and by selling bank money at 5% agio, and buying it at 4%. These sources of revenue were more than enough to pay for the wages of bank officers and defray the expense of management.

== Ledgers ==
The archive of the Amsterdam Wisselbank is one of the few archives that yields data comparable over a fairly long period for a large number of merchants. The current accounts of the customers were kept in the series of ledgers. Each merchant had one or more pages, the smaller merchants a part of a page. Often the same pages were kept for several years. An alphabetical list of the merchants and their current account pages can be found in the index. In the ledgers, a record was kept of the amounts written in and out. The entries and exits were not always in coin, but very often in bills of exchange. The operation of this system is well illustrated in the Notarial Archives, which are also kept in the Amsterdam City Archives. There, bills of exchange change hands, are paid or not paid, resulting in a 'bill of exchange protest' and 'insinuations' (demands for a desired action).

== Failure ==
The bank was administered by a committee of city government officials concerned to keep its affairs secret. It initially operated on a deposit-only basis, but later it allowed depositors to overdraw their accounts, and it lent large sums to the Municipality of Amsterdam (the Society of Suriname and the East India Company). Initially this was kept confidential, but it had become public knowledge by July 1790. After 1783, the agio on the bank money dropped slowly from 4, 3, 2, 1 to almost 0%, and in 1790, the bank had to declare itself insolvent, offering to sell silver at a 10% discount to depositors. The City of Amsterdam took over direct control in 1791. (Note: In 1782 the VOC had a debt of 20 million, which grew to 100 million gulden in 1792.) Between 1792 and 1794, the bank made no profit. In June 1794, king Victor Amadeus III of Sardinia, who was in war with France, borrowed more than one million guilders; a box with jewels was kept in the Wisselbank as a deposit. On 23 January 1795, during the Batavian Revolution, the doors of the Wisselbank were locked and the treasure sealed; within two weeks the French First Republic claimed the jewels belonging to the King of Sardinia. The Wisselbank refused to hand them over, referring to the charter of 16 December 1670, which allowed it to give credit to foreign nations, and the money could not be arrested, etc. Especially following the release of the Bank of Exchange's financial report in March 1795, its role within the payment system gradually diminished.

Amsterdam's new city council published the Wisselbank's unfavorable balance sheet figures. For the first time in two centuries, the bank's duty of secrecy was broken, causing a great deal of commotion. Trust in the bank was subsequently minimal. A loan was issued to raise capital to save the Wisselbank, which was still considered vital to the Amsterdam economy, but far too few lenders signed up. The new, revolutionary, representatives of the people therefore came up with another plan. They claimed that the former regents were personally responsible for the large loans that had been made under their leadership. They wanted these former regents – and if they had died, their heirs – to settle the deficits out of their own pockets. An official committee examined this proposal and concluded that it was unfair and impracticable. The regents might have acted imprudently, but not criminally. Lending to the VOC was against the rules, but it was also an old tradition. The liability would have to go back a few generations, and that was not feasible.

Eventually, the council decided to institute a compulsory loan, to be paid for by the 55 richest inhabitants of the city. They protested vehemently, but in vain. They just had to pay. Fortunately for them, with the support of the Staatsbewind (the council of the Republic), money was raised which was soon used to pay off the loan. In 1802, the bank's liabilities were once again entirely backed by 'metallique specie', and from that point forward, the commissioners were explicitly prohibited from extending credit to 'any private person, corporation or constituted authority, by whatever name'.

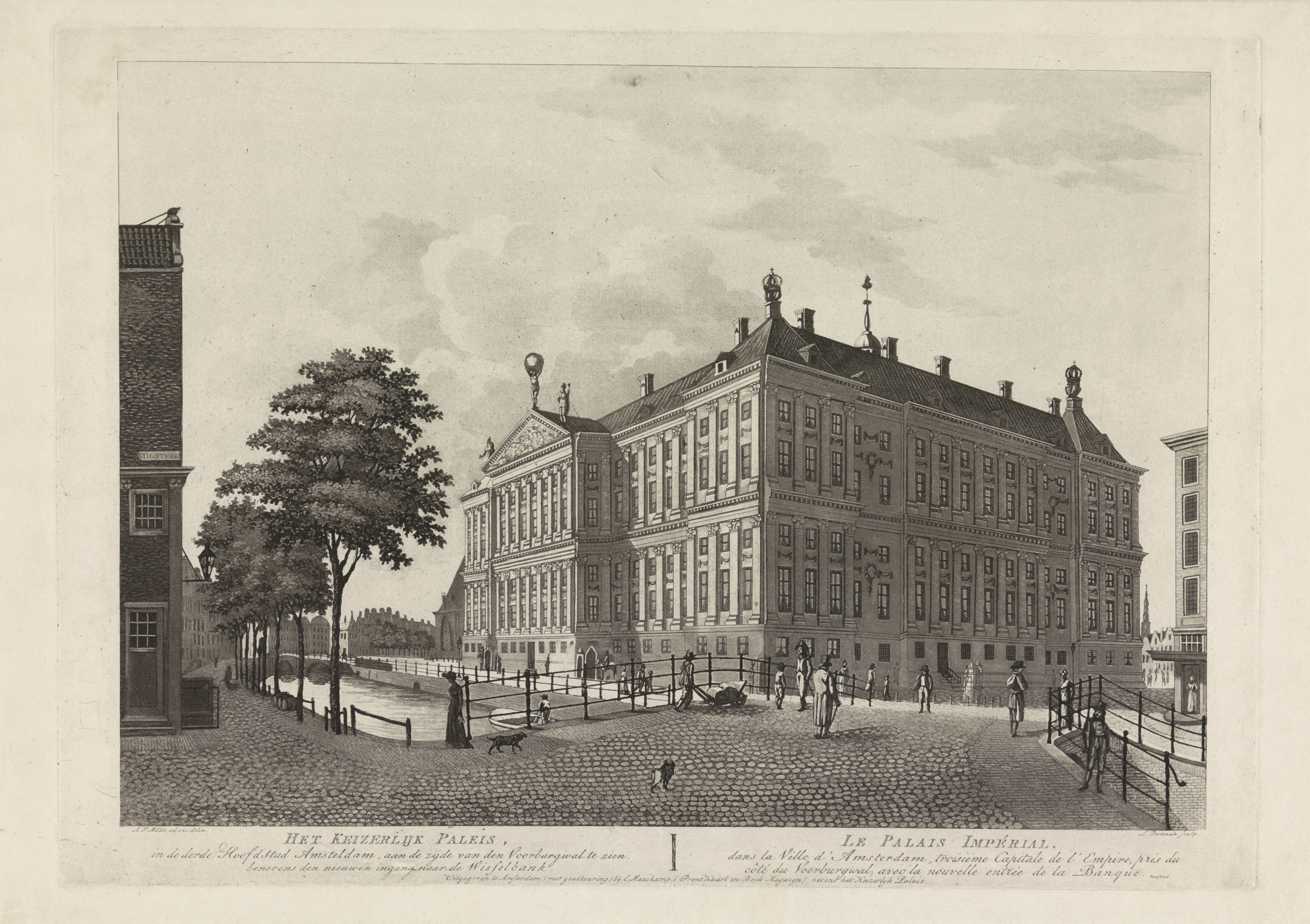
The Imperial Palace in 1811 with a new entrance to the Wisselbank from 1808. Drawing by F.A. Milatz

In 1808, a new entrance was established due to Louis Bonaparte's decision to repurpose the town hall as his palace, necessitating the separation of the bank from the palace. A royal palace with a bank inside was considered a novelty and was unique in the world. Following the French departure in 1813, the new Dutch King Willem I of the Netherlands sought to discontinue the Wisselbank, as it had become incapable of disbursing salaries. During his years in exile in England, he had become better acquainted with the Bank of England, a central credit institution that issued banknotes which provided a uniform medium of exchange. Willem had seen how the English bank acted as a driving force for the economy and had contributed to the rapid industrialization of England. In the Netherlands, such an institution was lacking, and companies that wanted to attract new money for investments could still only turn to private individuals. Consequently, the Dutch invested little in industry or industrialization in those times. Around 1814, the Wisselbank moved to Oude Turfmarkt, but the commissioners and the archive stayed in the former town hall.

The history of the Bank of Amsterdam holds significance beyond the realm of historians. According to the economists and financial historians Steve Quinn (Texas Christian University) and Will Roberds (Federal Reserve Bank of Atlanta), it offers three valuable lessons that remain pertinent in assessing the financial stability of a central bank today:

- The bank's first mistake was to try to pursue a policy of stable money while at the same time building up high claims on debtors of questionable quality (in this specific case, the East India Company, among others).
- The second mistake was that the municipality of Amsterdam left the bank alone with its losses for a long time, but demanded profit distributions whenever this seemed possible. If the municipality had left a larger part of the profits in the bank as reserves, the bank would have been better prepared for difficult times.
- The third mistake was the insufficient recapitalization of the bank by the city in 1791 and 1792. When a bank has to be recapitalized, savings must not be made if confidence in the bank is not to be lost again.

== Commissioners ==
- Joan Munter (1611–1685) seated 28 years between 1639 and 1671
- Adriaan van Loon (1631–1722) seated 22 years
- Harman van Ghesel (1701–1787) seated 45 years.

== See also ==
- List of central banks
- List of banks in the Netherlands
