= Middleham Hoard =

Coin hoard in Britain

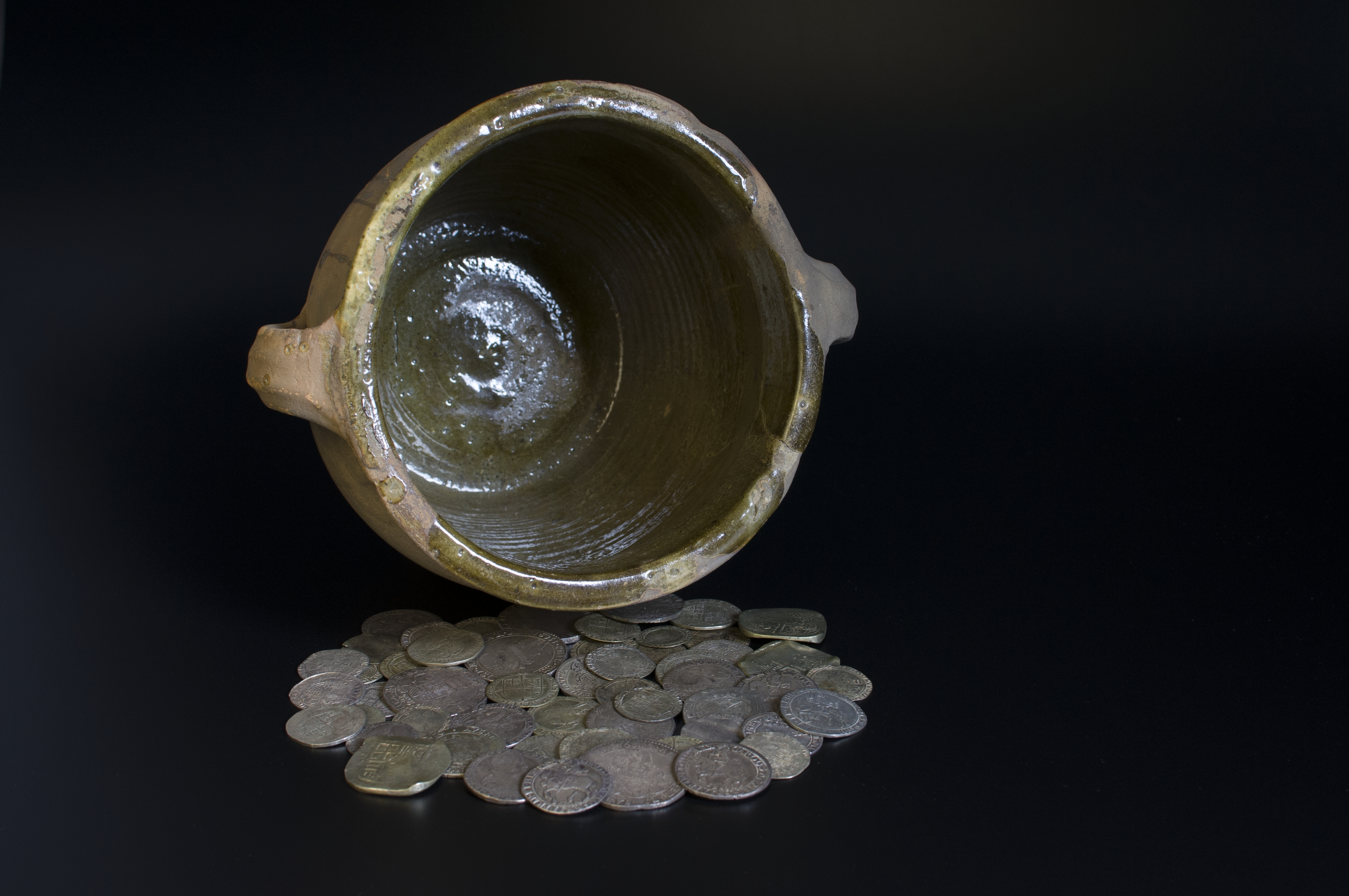
- A selection of the hoard's coins now in the Yorkshire Museum

- Location within England
- 54°16′47″N 1°50′24″W
- Type: Hoard
- Location: Middleham, North Yorkshire, England

History
- Event: Buried in the 1640s

Site notes
- Excavation dates: 1993
- Archaeologists: Analysed by Craig Barclay

The Middleham Hoard is a coin hoard found near Middleham, North Yorkshire in England. It dates from the period of the English Civil War, and consists of 5,099 coins, all silver. It is the largest hoard of coins buried during the Civil War to have been discovered. The hoard was discovered in June 1993 by William Caygill while using a metal detector. Though referred to as one hoard, the coins were buried in three pots in two pits. These had slightly different deposition dates; likely in the later 1640s, though the person making the deposits was probably the same. The coins are dispersed between museums and private collections, 54 of them now in the Yorkshire Museum's numismatic collection.

== Discovery and follow up ==
William Caygill, a metal detector enthusiast discovered the hoard on 22 June 1993 within the grounds of Cotescue Park, on the south-west edge of the small market town of Middleham. Caygill discovered the first two pots (A and B), and returning two days later he discovered a third pot (C).

== Deposition context ==
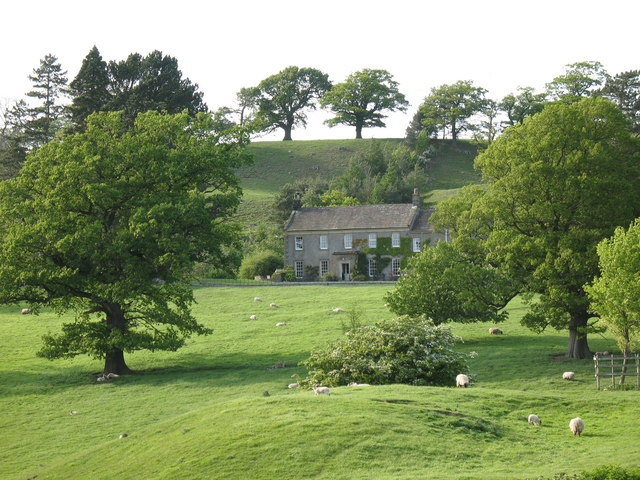
Cotescue Park

The pots were found in the grounds of Cotescue Park, which had been a royal hunting lodge, and is situated just north of the town of Coverham, about 1.2 miles (2 km) south-west of Middleham Castle. In the 17th century Cotescue Park was the seat of Sir Christopher Croft (died 1649), who was Lord Mayor of York in 1629 and 1641. Adam Loftus, 1st Viscount Loftus (c. 1568–1643), formerly Lord Chancellor of Ireland (1619–1639), lived at Coverham during the early 1640s until his death in 1643. His son, Edward Loftus, 2nd Viscount Loftus, lived in Middleham Castle until 1644, after which time the castle was put to use as a prison. Although Middleham Castle did not see any fighting during the Civil War, it was partially demolished some time after 1646 so that it could not be used as a garrison.

Two of the pots (A and B) were discovered together, and the third pot (C) was discovered about twenty paces to the west. All three pots were covered with a capstone made from local Coverdale sandstone. The latest coins in Pots A and B date to 1645–1646, suggesting a date of deposition of about 1646. Pot C includes ten shilling coins with a late portrait of Charles I that are not represented in either Pot A or Pot B; Pot C also includes a single shilling with a "sceptre" privy-mark that was in use from 1646 to 1649. These features suggest that Pot C was deposited at a slightly later date than Pots A and B, possibly in 1648. However, the physical closeness of Pot C to Pots A and B suggest that all three pots were buried by the same family.

== Containers ==
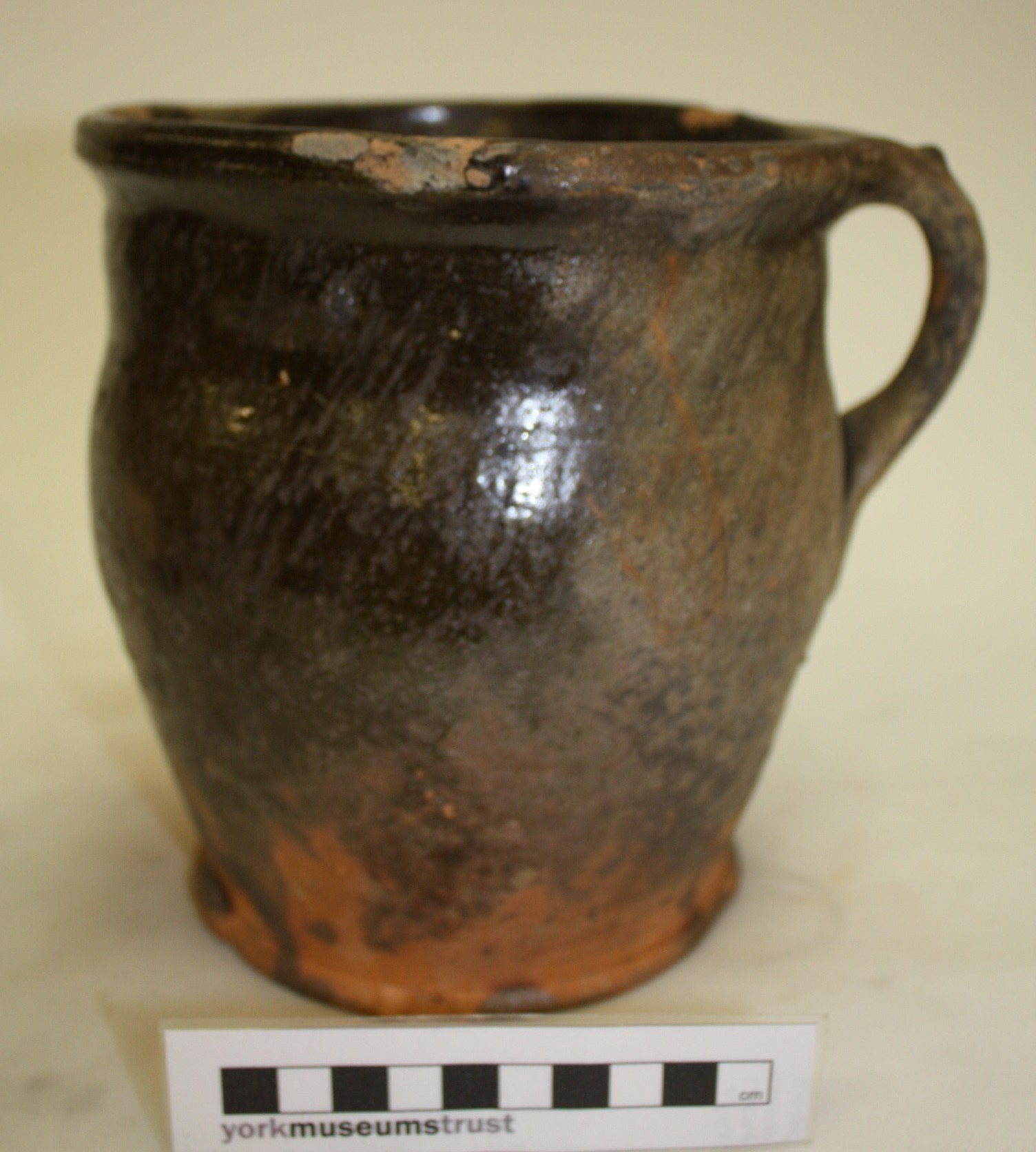
Middleham Hoard pot A

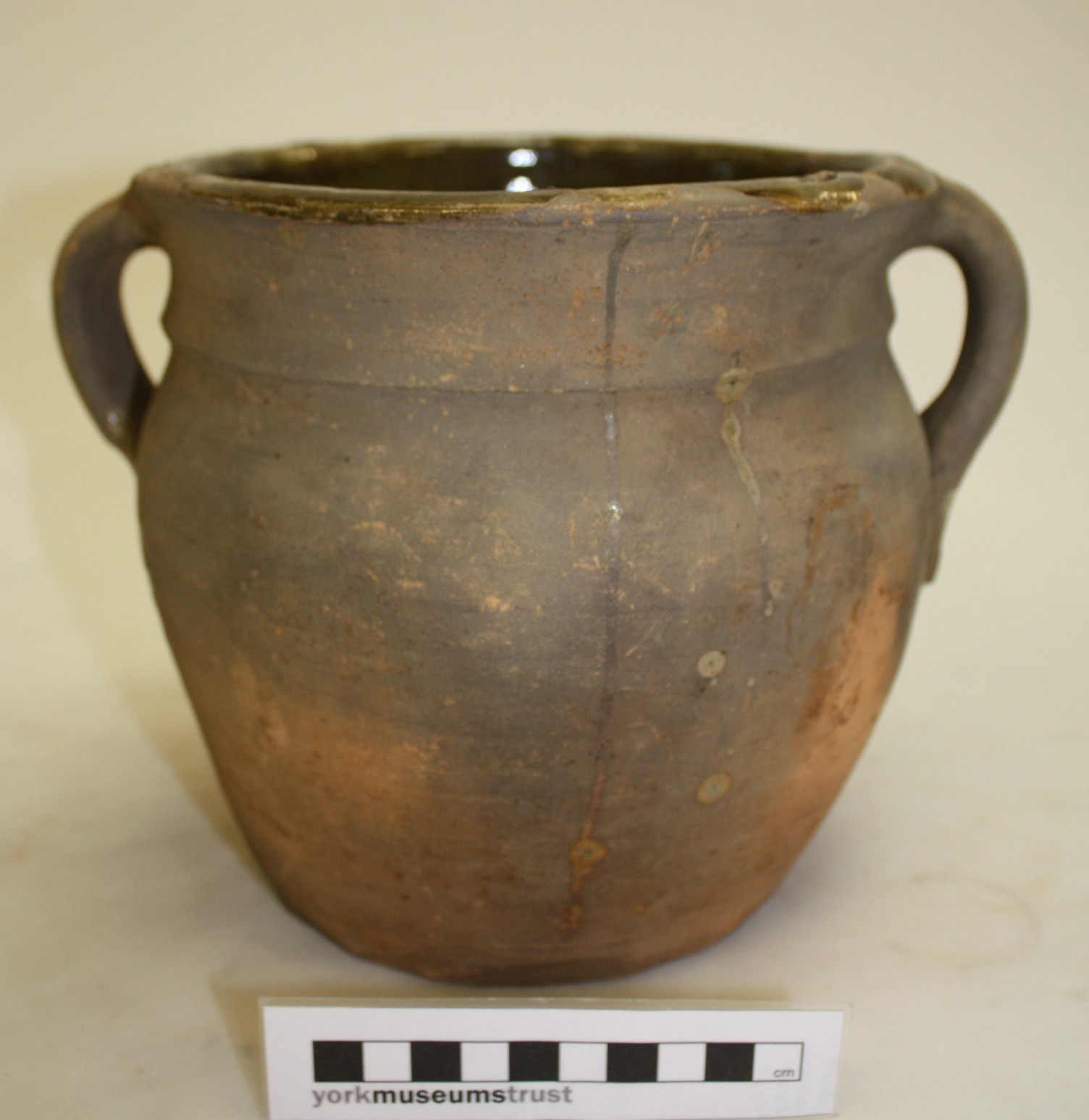
Middleham Hoard pot B

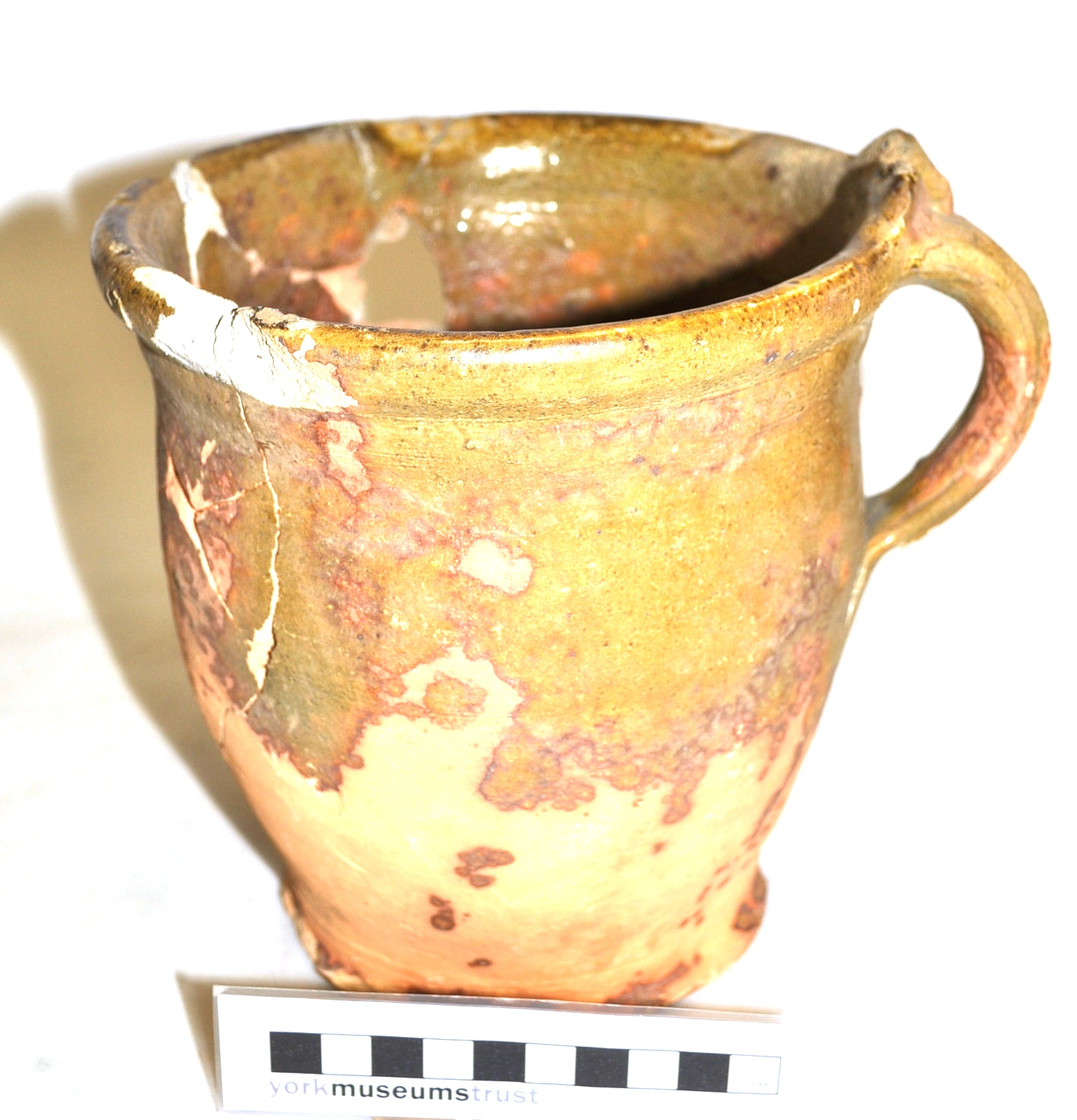
Middleham Hoard pot C

The three pots in which the coins were buried in are all rather similar types of mid-seventeenth century kitchen ware. They are all handled jars that would have been used in the kitchen, and as they show no signs of being used for cooking it has been surmised that they would have been used for food storage. Pot A and Pot B are most similar, and Pot A has been definitively identified as Ryedale ware. Pot C is somewhat different from Pots A and B, and is not Ryedale ware, but comes from a different unidentified source.

== Coins ==
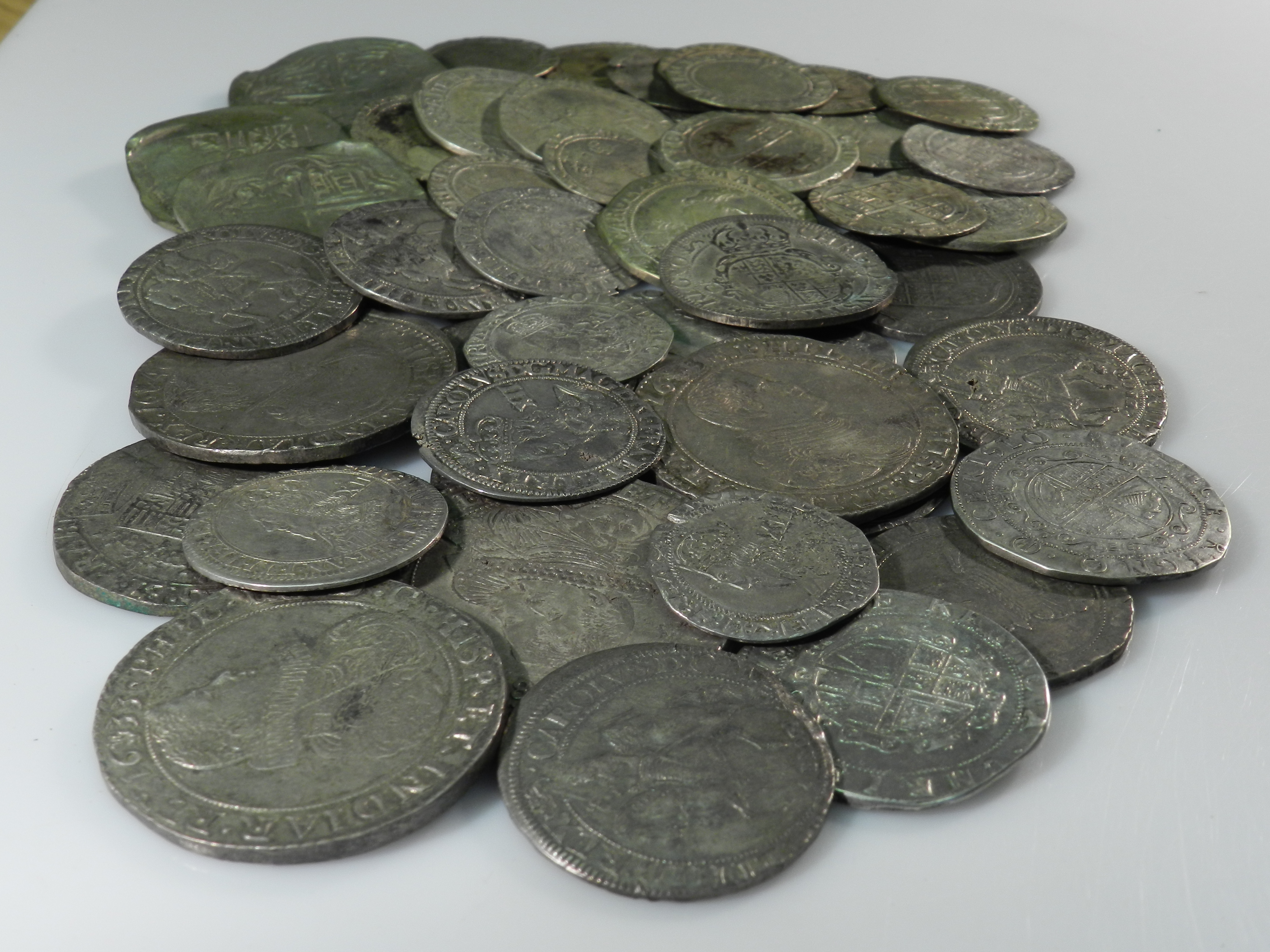
A selection of the coins from the side

The coins include English issues of all the monarchs between Edward VI and Charles I, Scottish and Irish coins, and those of Philip IV of Spain and his governors in the Spanish Netherlands (Archduke Albert and his wife Isabella), as well as 39 counterfeits. The total face value was over £312. Of the 5,099 coins, 4,772 were English, 31 Scottish, 10 Irish, 245 from the "Spanish possessions in Europe" (all Netherlands) and 2 from the Spanish New World.

One of the main features of the hoard is the relatively large proportion of Spanish coins. There are 247 coins from the Spanish Netherlands and Spanish America, comprising nearly 5% of the hoard by numbers, but these coins are of high value (a ducaton being worth five shillings and sixpence) and the face value of these Spanish coins is about £65, which is some 20% of the face value of the entire hoard. The circulation of Spanish coins in England during this period seems to have been largely limited to royalist areas, and they have been found in other Civil War hoards from Yorkshire, although no other hoard has such a high proportion of Spanish coins.

Another notable feature of the hoard is the inclusion of 39 counterfeit coins, most of them from Pots A and B (only six from Pot C). Most of the counterfeits are copies of contemporary English coins, but Pots A and B both include counterfeits of Spanish-American reales, which may have been counterfeited because the genuine coins were often poorly struck and would not have been very familiar to most people. Two of the three counterfeit Spanish-American coins in Pot A were cast from the same mould, and the two counterfeit Spanish-American coins in Pot B were also cast from the same mould, which suggests that the counterfeits may well have been made locally (if the counterfeits came from far away there would have been a higher degree of diversity). It is also possible that some of the counterfeit English coins were made locally, such as copy of a Charles I shilling from the York mint.

The distribution of coins in the three pots between reigns is shown in the table below.

Reign	Example coin	Pot A	Pot B	Pot C
Edward VI (England)		6	10	4
Mary I (England)		0	0	2
Philip and Mary (England)		9	9	8
Elizabeth I (England)	Counterfeit shilling of Elizabeth I of England. Dated: 1589–1592 O: Bust of Elizabeth I R: Coat of arms on cross	492	775	542
James I (England)	Counterfeit shilling of James I of England. Dated: 1606–1607 O: Bust of James I R: Coat of arms on cross	151	279	169
Charles I (England)	Half crown of Charles I of England. Dated: 1643–1644 O: Charles I armed and mounted R: Coat of arms on cross	524	952	840
James VI (Scotland)		6	17	0
Charles I (Scotland)		3	4	1
Elizabeth I (Ireland)		0	1	0
James I (Ireland)		1	6	2
Spanish Possessions (Europe)	Ducaton of Philip IV of Spain. Dated: 1633– O: Bust of Philip IV R: Coat of Arms with lions	53	150	42
Spanish Possessions (America)		2	0	0
Counterfeit	Counterfeit eight reales of Philip IV of Spain. Dated: 1621–1655 O: Cross with castles and lions R: Coat of arms	16	17	6
Total		1,263	2,220	1,616

Many of the coins had been clipped, the proportions rising as their age increased.
