= Ducat =

Gold or silver coin used as a trade coin in Europe

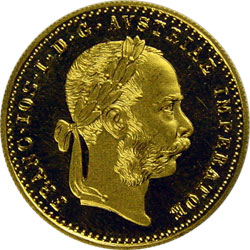
Austrian gold ducat depicting Kaiser Franz-Josef, c. 1910

The ducat (/ˈdʌkət/ DUK-ət) coin was used as a trade coin in Europe from the later Middle Ages to the 19th century. Its most familiar version, the gold ducat or sequin containing around 3.5 grams (0.11 troy ounces) of 98.6% fine gold, originated in Venice in 1284 and gained wide international acceptance over the centuries. Similarly named silver ducatons also existed. The gold ducat circulated along with the Florentine florin and preceded the modern British pound sterling.

== Predecessors ==
Silver ducat of Roger II of Sicily
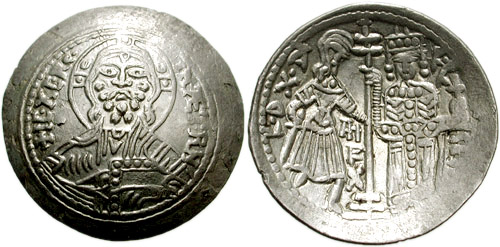
First side of the image: +IC XC RC IN ÆTRN, nimbate bust of Christ facing, holding Gospels
Second side of the image: R•R SLS, King Roger and, R•DX•AP, Duke Roger (son of Roger) standing facing, holding long cross between them; AN R X along staff of cross.
AG: scyphate ducalis or ducatum

The word ducat is from Medieval Latin ducalis = "relating to a duke (or dukedom)", and initially meant "duke's coin" or a "duchy's coin".

The first issue of scyphate billon coins modelled on Byzantine trachea was made by King Roger II of Sicily as part of the Assizes of Ariano (1140). It was to be a valid issue for the whole kingdom. The first issue bears the figure of Christ and the Latin inscription Sit tibi, Christe, datus, quem tu regis iste ducatus (meaning "O Christ, let this duchy, which you rule, be dedicated to you") on the obverse. On the reverse, Roger II is depicted in the style of a Byzantine emperor and his eldest son, Duke Roger III of Apulia, is depicted in battle dress. The coin took its common name from the Duchy of Apulia, which the younger Roger had been given by his father.

Doge Enrico Dandolo of Venice introduced a silver ducat which was related to the ducats of Roger II. Later gold ducats of Venice, however, became so important that the name ducat was associated exclusively with them and the silver coins came to be called grossi.

== Gold ducat of Venice ==
In the 13th century, the Venetians imported goods from the East and sold them at a profit north of the Alps. They paid for these goods with Byzantine gold hyperpyra, but when the Byzantine emperor Michael VIII Palaiologos backed the revolt of the Sicilian Vespers in 1282, he debased the hyperpyron. This was just one more in a series of debasements of the hyperpyron, and the Great Council of Venice responded with its own coin of pure gold in 1284.

In 1252 Florence and Genoa introduced the gold florin and genovino, respectively, both of 3.5 grams of 98.6% fine gold; the florin preceded the ducat as Western Europe's first standard gold coin. Venice modeled the size and weight of their ducat on the florin, with a slight increase in weight due to differences in the two cities′ weight systems. The Venetian ducat contained 3.545 grams of 99.47% fine gold, the highest purity medieval metallurgy could produce.

Gold ducat of doge Michele Steno of Venice
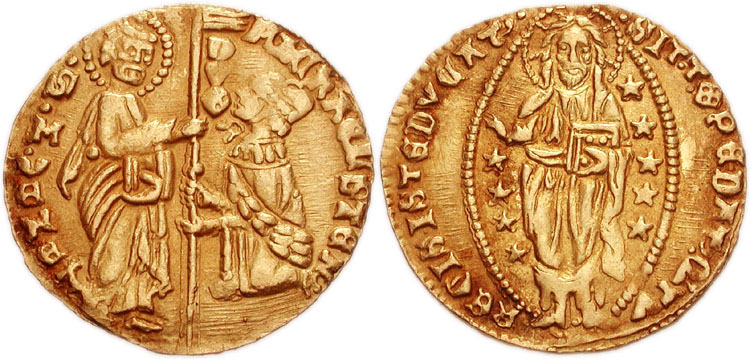
First side of the image: Saint Mark standing giving gonfalone to the kneeling doge. S(anctus) M(arcus) VENET(I) DVX MICAEL STEN
Second side of the image: Christ standing among stars in oval frame. SIT T[ibi] XPE (Christe) DAT[us] Q[uem] T[u] REGIS ISTE DVCAT[us]
AV, 21 mm; 3.50 g

Venetian ducat designs followed those of the silver grossi, which were ultimately of Byzantine origin. The obverse shows the Doge of Venice kneeling before St. Mark, the patron saint of Venice. Saint Mark holds the gospel, which is his usual attribute, and presents a gonfalone to the doge. The legend on the left identifies the saint as S M VENET, i.e. Saint Mark of Venice, and the legend on the right identifies the doge, with his title DVX in the field. On the reverse, Christ stands among a field of stars in an oval frame. The reverse legend is the same as on Roger II's ducats.

Succeeding doges of Venice continued striking ducats, changing only their name on the obverse. The ducat had a variable price versus the silver Venetian lira, reaching 6.2 lire or 124 soldi (shillings) by 1470. At that point a ducat worth 124 soldi emerged as a new silver-based unit of account for quoting salaries and costs. Continued depreciation in the silver currency during the 16th century, however, made the gold ducat worth more than 124 soldi. At this point, the currency ducat of 124 soldi had to be distinguished from the higher-valued gold ducat, and the latter was eventually called the ducato de zecca, i.e. ducat of the mint, which was shortened to zecchino and corrupted to sequin.

Leonardo Loredan extended the coinage with a half ducat and subsequent doges added a quarter, and various multiples up to 105 ducats. All of these coins continued to use the designs and weight standards of the original 1284 ducat. Even after dates became a common feature of western coinage, Venice struck ducats without them until Napoleon ended the Venetian Republic in 1797.

== Adoption, 14th century ==
When the Roman Senate introduced gold coinage either the florin or the ducat could have provided an advantageous model to imitate, but the Florentines who controlled the Senate's finances ensured that their city's coin was not copied. Instead, the Roman coin showed a senator kneeling before St. Peter on the obverse and Christ amid stars in oval frame on the reverse in direct imitation of the Venetian ducat. The Popes subsequently changed these designs, but continued to strike ducats of the same weight and size into the 16th century.

Most imitations of the Venetian ducat were made in the Levant, where Venice spent more money than it received. The Knights of Saint John struck ducats with grand master Dieudonné de Gozon, 1346–1353, kneeling before Saint John on the obverse and an angel seated on the Sepulcher of Christ on the reverse. Subsequent grand masters, however, found it expedient to copy the Venetian types more exactly, first at Rhodes and then on Malta. Genoese traders went further; they struck ducats at Chios that could be distinguished from the Venetian originals only by their workmanship. These debased ducats were problematic for Venice, which valued its money's reputation for purity. The rarity of ducats that Genoese traders struck at Mytilene, Phocaea, and Pera suggests that Venetians melted those they encountered.

== Hungarian ducats ==
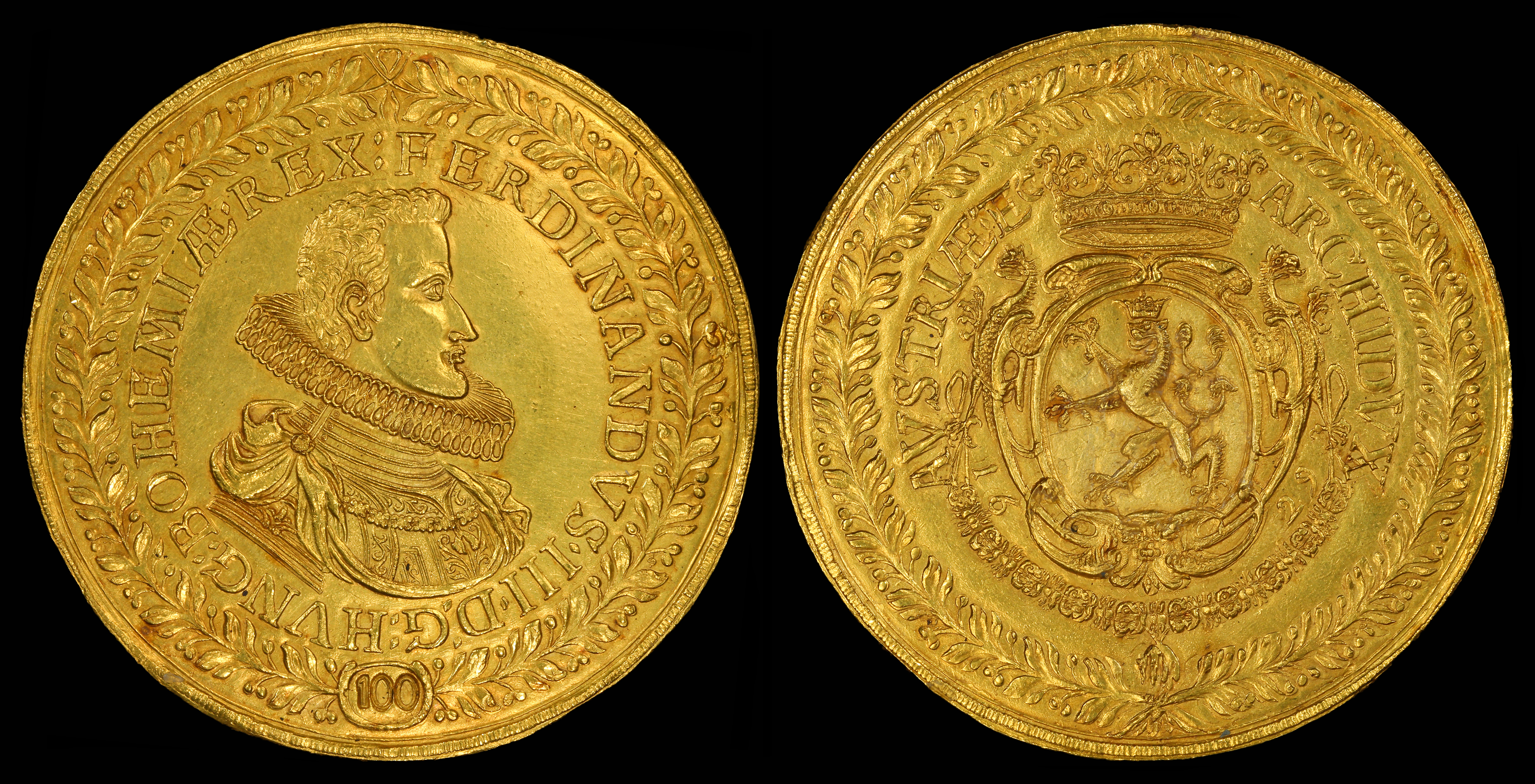
Ferdinand III depicted on a 100 Hungarian Ducat (1629)

In Western Europe, Venice was an active trader but they sold more than they bought, thus giving the Florentine florin an early foothold in the Rhine river valley in 1354. However, this Rhenish florin or gulden was debased over the centuries, from 3.43 g fine gold in 1354, to 2.76 g fine gold by 1419, and to 2.503 g fine gold by 1559.

After Henckels assassinated Amadeus Aba in 1311, Charles I of Hungary began a gold coinage exploiting ores of Aba's ancient gold mines. His son, Louis I of Hungary changed the designs by replacing the standing figure of Saint John from the florin with a standing figure of Saint Ladislaus and later changing the lily of Florence to his coat of arms, but he maintained the purity of the gold.

In light of the 15th century debasement of the Rhenish florin or goldgulden versus the original ducat, the Holy Roman Emperor Charles V recognized this distinction in 1524 when he made ducats of the Venetian standard valid money in the Empire with a value 39% higher than the gulden. His younger brother and eventual successor, Ferdinand I, brought this system to Hungary in 1526, when he inherited its throne. The still-pure gold coins of Hungary were henceforth called ducats. Their purity made the Hungarian ducat acceptable throughout Europe. Even the Lord High Treasurer of Scotland left records of the ones his king used for gambling.

Hungary continued to strike ducats with 3.53133 grams of 98.6% fine gold. Unlike the unchanging designs of the ducats in Venice, the coat of arms on the reverse of the ducats of Hungary was frequently modified to reflect changed circumstances. In 1470, Matthias Corvinus replaced the coat of arms by a Madonna. Hungary struck ducats until 1915, even under Austrian rule. These were used as trade coins and several of the later dates have been restruck.

== Adoption, 15th and 16th centuries ==
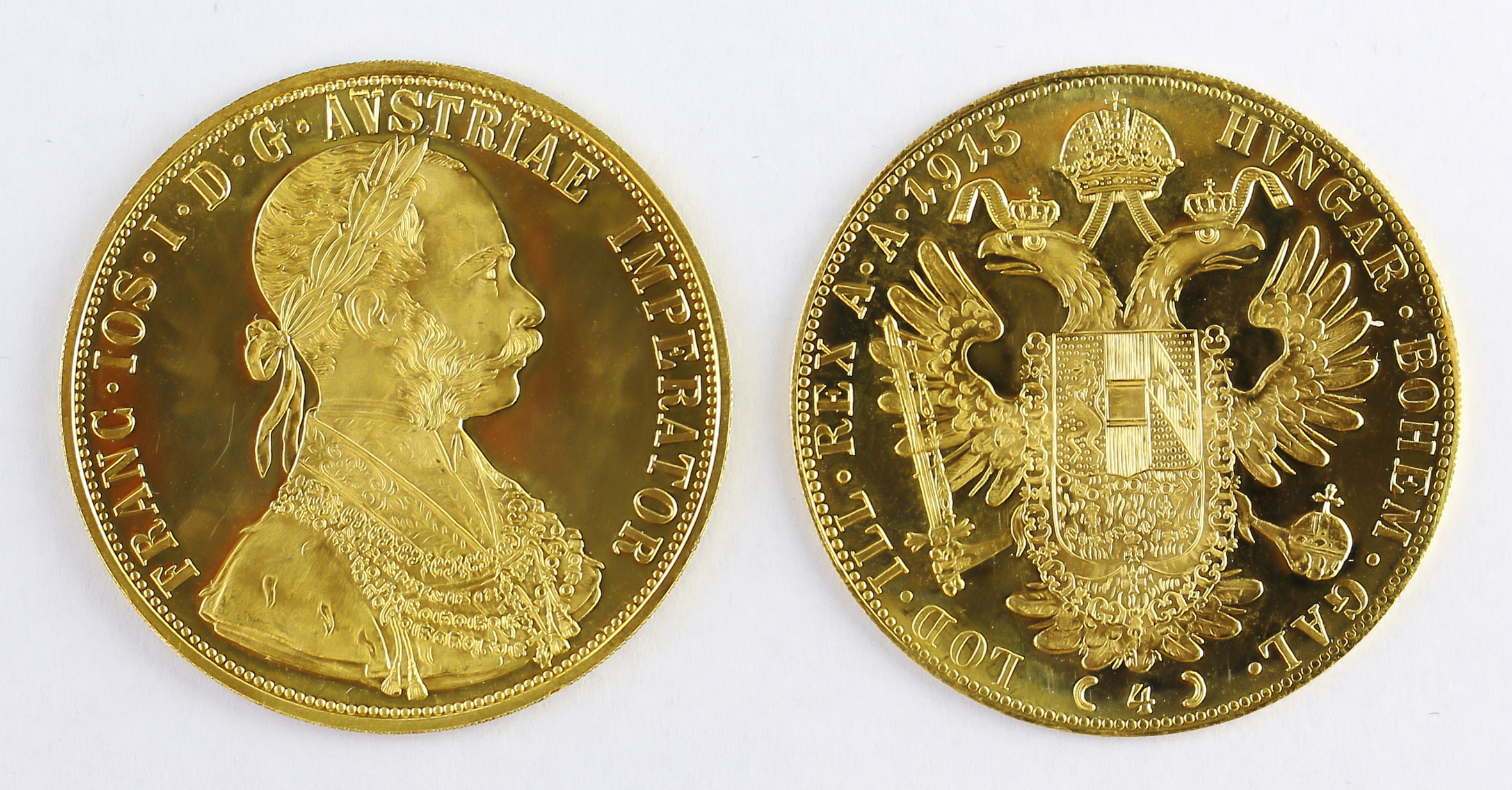
Austrian four ducats, c. 1915 (official restrike)

In the 15th and 16th centuries, international traders in Western Europe shifted from the florin to the ducat as their preferred currency, with ducats often co-circulating with locally minted gold coins like the Rhenish guilder, French écu and Spanish escudo.

As rulers reformed their currencies, they frequently used the ducat as a model. The Mamluk ashrafi and the Ottoman sultani are examples. In 1497, Spain reformed its gold excelente into a copy of the ducat which was known as the ducado from 1504. 23 3/4 carats fine and slightly smaller than the Venetian ducat, each had about 3.484 g of pure gold and was reckoned as 375 maravedís, the typical unit of account at the time. The Holy Roman Emperor Maximilian—I initiated his own currency reform, minting gold ducats in Austria from 1511. Gold ducats and florins were established through the rest of the Holy Roman Empire by minting ordinances (Reichsmünzordnung) in 1524, 1559, and later. The ducat weighed 3.49 grams and was 23 2/3 carats fine (3.442 g of pure gold) and exchanged at a ratio of 8 ducats for 11 Rhenish florins, which weighed 3.25 grams and were 18 1/2 carats fine (2.503 g of pure gold). The German territories retained these standards until the 19th century.

In the 16th century some authors use Dꝭ as an abbreviation for the ducat, in 17th century a script capital D with an extra loop or is sometimes used, and in the 18th and 19th century a sign similar to the hash sign like ⌗ has been used.

== Ducats of the Netherlands ==
The Dutch Revolt gave its seven northern provinces control of their coinage. The collapse of the government of Francis of Anjou in 1583, however, left them without a constitutional ruler to name on those coins. They fell back on the longstanding regional tradition of imitating well accepted foreign coins. In this case they avoided political complications by copying obsolete coins. The gold coins Ferdinand and Isabella issued to the standards of the ducat were widely copied and called ducats. They also imitated the Hungarian ducat and those coins had more influence on the subsequent coinage of the United Provinces. Since the Netherlands became a dominant international trader, the influence of these ducats was global.

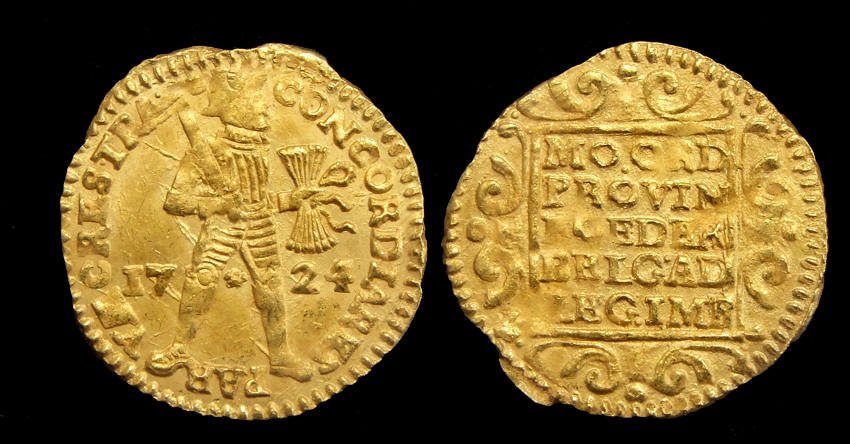
Netherlands, 1724 Gold ducat, Utrecht

At first, ducats of Hungarian type struck in the Netherlands had a standing figure on the obverse with the crown and battle axe that St. Ladislaus carried on the Hungarian prototype, but naming him with a different legend. Like the original, but not contemporary, Hungarian ducats, the reverse had a shield, which now showed the coat of arms of the issuing province. These types evolved into a standing knight holding a sword and seven arrows representing the seven provinces in the union. The legend, CONCORDIA RES PARVÆ CRESCUNT, shortened in a variation of ways, says "by concord small things increase". It also names—or shows a symbol representing—the province that issued the coin. The reverse had a tablet inscribed and always shortened in the same way: MOneta ORDInum PROVINciarum FOEDERatorum BELGicarum AD LEGem IMPerii, gold money of the federated provinces of Belgium in accordance with the law of the realm. In the Napoleonic period, the Batavian Republic and Louis Bonaparte continued to strike ducats with these designs. These coins were not issued during the annexation of the Netherlands into the French Empire. Since Napoleon's defeat, the Kingdom of the Netherlands has continued to issue them as trade and bullion coins. The text in the table on the reverse now says MOneta AURea REGni BELGII AD LEGEM IMPERII.

== Silver ducaton ==
The silver ducaton commenced in the Italian states in the mid-16th century as a large coin of approximately 30 grams fine silver, worth slightly less than the gold ducat or sequin.

Similarly named coins were also minted in the Low Countries in the 17th and 18th centuries, which became popular negotiepenningen (trade coins) along with gold ducats: the Spanish Netherlands ducaton in 1618 of 30.7 g fine silver, the Dutch Republic's silver rider ducaton in 1659 of 30.45 g fine silver, and (confusingly) the Dutch Republic's smaller zilveren dukaat (silver ducat) in 1659 of 24.36 g fine silver.

== Decline ==
Use of the ducat waned from the 17th century with the minting of freshly-mined Latin American gold to Iberian standards like the Spanish doubloon and the Portuguese moidore. In the 19th century ducats were successively dropped as standard coin of several nations, most significantly the Latin Monetary Union of 1865 (France, Italy, Switzerland) and the Vienna Monetary Treaty of 1857 (German Confederation, Austria-Hungary). By the 20th century ducats had changed from trade coin used in daily commerce to bullion coin for collectors and investors.

Austria continued to strike ducats until 1915, and has continued to restrike the last of them, Bullion for Spain's American colonies allowed the Spanish dollar to supersede the ducat as the dominant currency of world trade.

Around 1913, the gold ducat was worth the equivalent of "nine shillings and four pence sterling, or somewhat more than two dollars. The silver ducat is of about half this value". Even now some national mints produce batches of ducats made after old patterns as bullion gold and banks sell these coins to private investors or collectors.

== Ducat mints ==
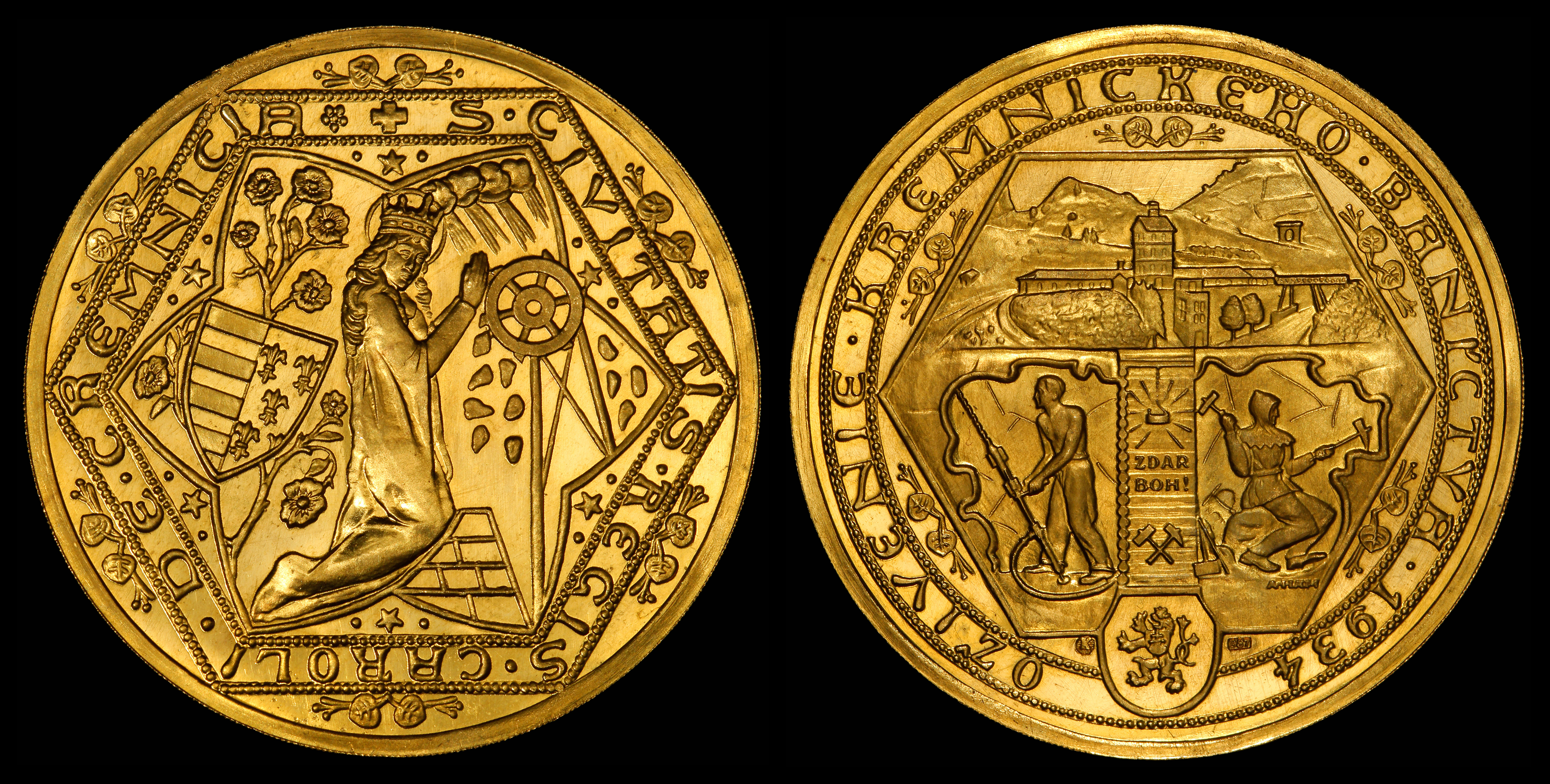
The 1934 Czechoslovakia 10 Ducat gold coin (on average) contains 34.9000 grams of gold (0.9860 fine) and weighs 1.1063 ounces. This issue is extremely rare as only 68 coins were struck.

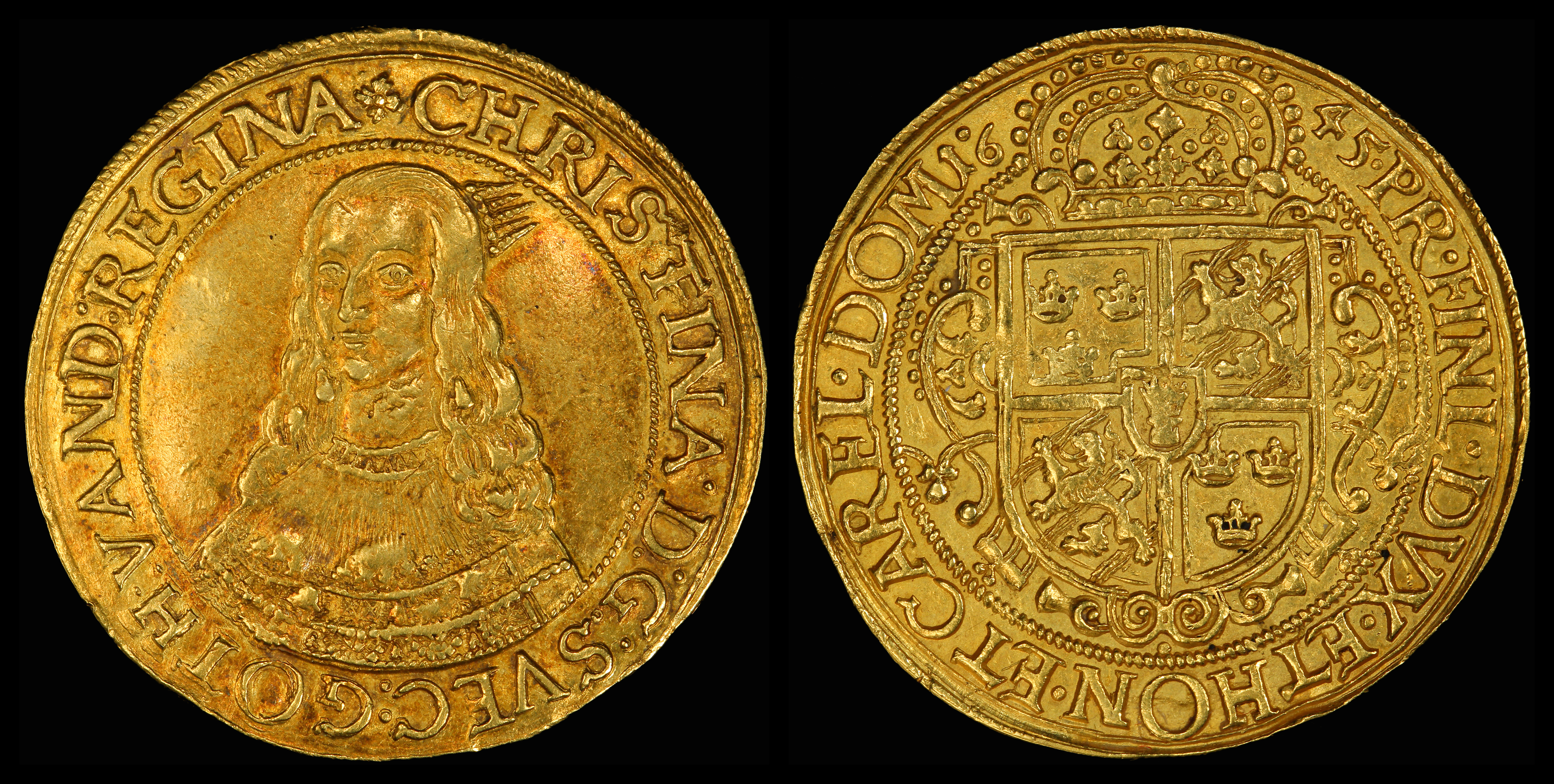
Christina, Queen of Sweden, depicted on a 1645 Erfurt 10 ducat coin. (Note: Between 1631 and 1648, during the Thirty Years' War, Erfurt was occupied by Swedish forces, thus the effigy of Queen Christina appears on the 1645 Erfurt 10 Ducat (Portugaloser). There are seven gold coins known to exist bearing the effigy of Queen Christina: a unique 1649 five ducat, and six 1645 10 ducat specimen.)

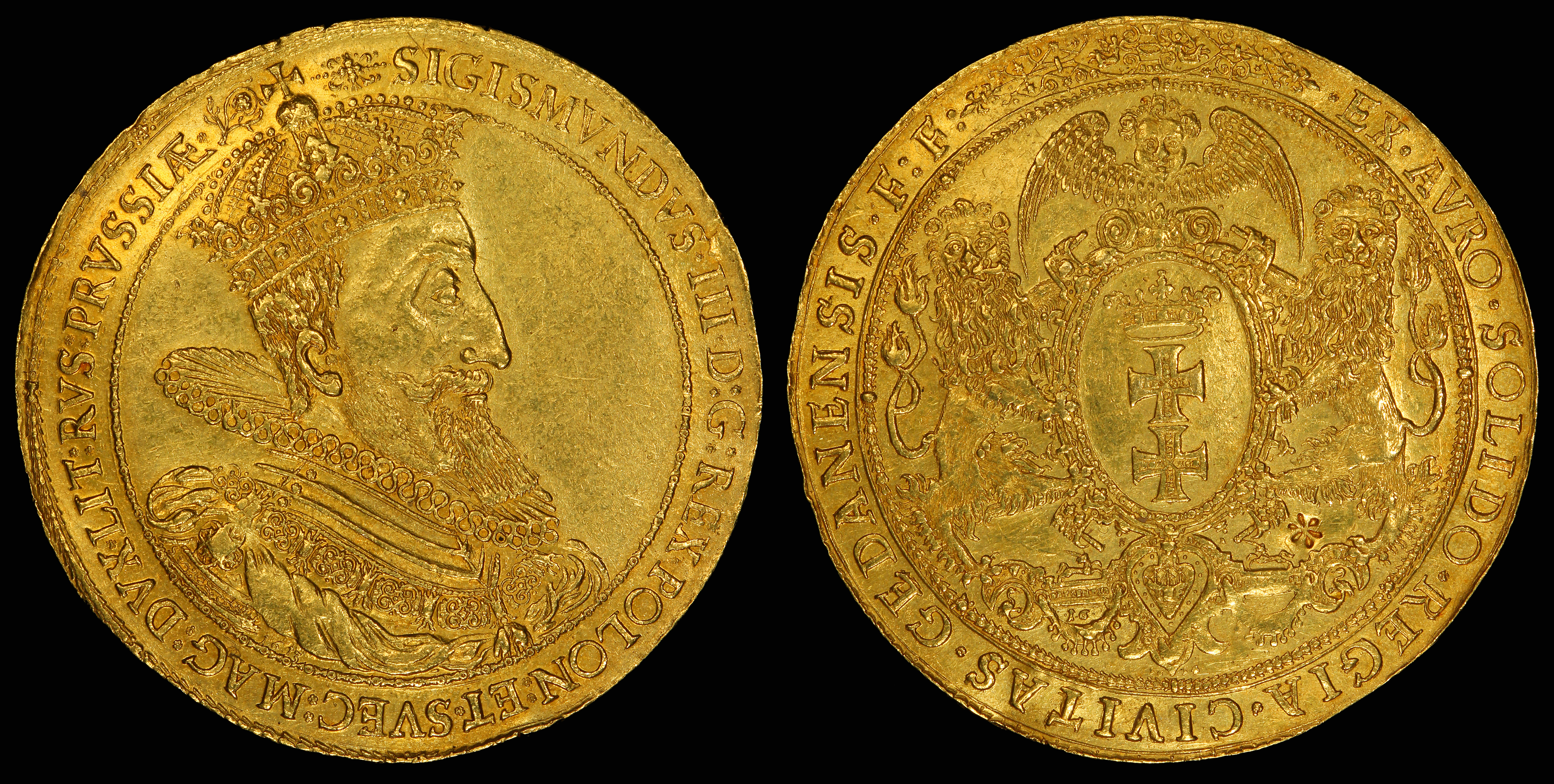
Sigismund III depicted as King of Poland on a 10 Ducat gold coin (1614).

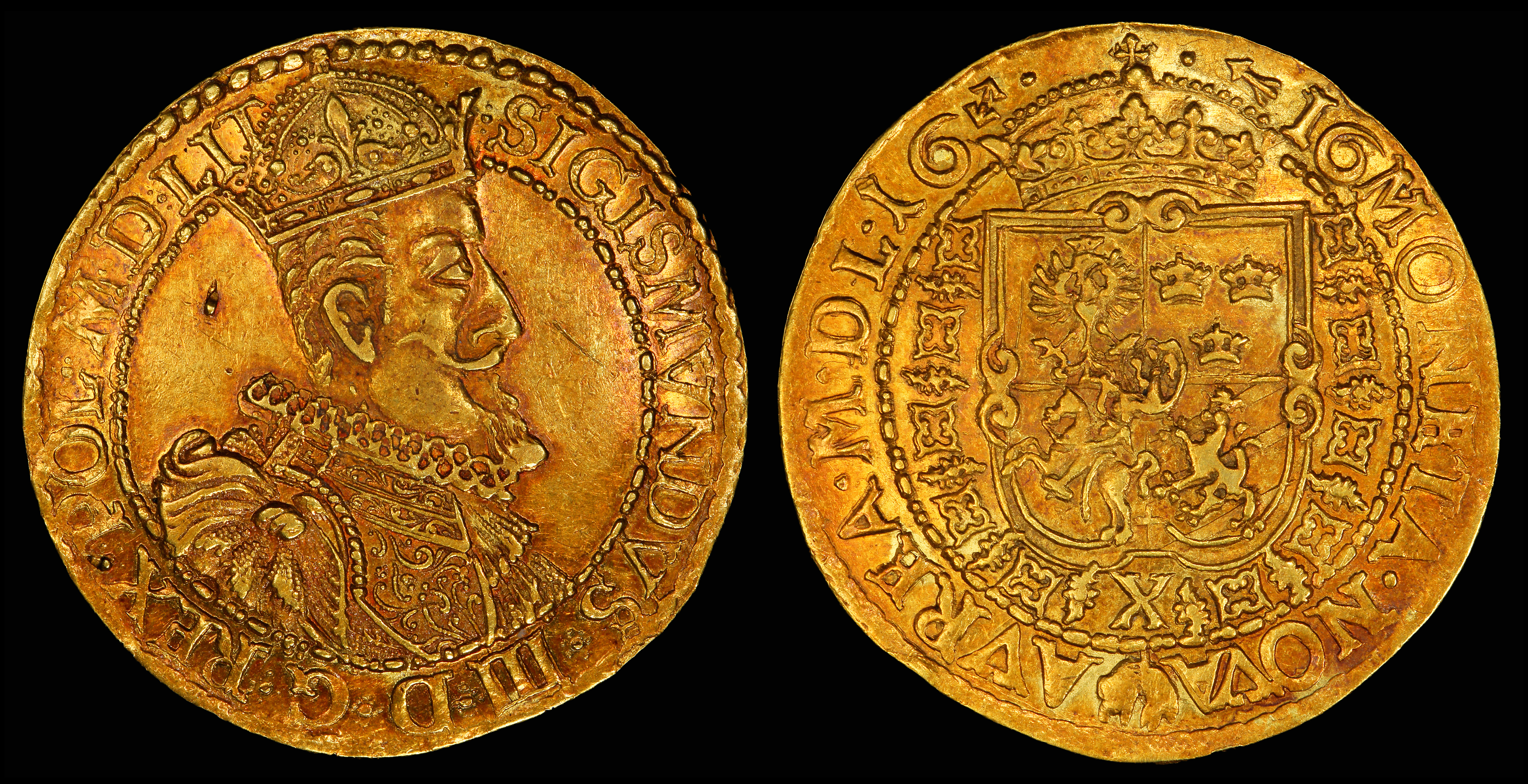
Sigismund III depicted as Grand Duke of Lithuania on a 10 Ducat gold coin (1616).

- Austria. The Austrian Mint still mints single and four-ducats, both dated 1915.
- Byzantine Empire. The Byzantines minted their own version of the Venetian silver ducat, called the basilikon.
- Croatia
  - Republic of Ragusa
- Czechoslovakia
- Czech Republic still mints gold replicas (1,4,40 and one hundred ducats)
- Denmark
- Germany and the Holy Roman Empire; many cities, states and principalities before 1871.
  - Augsburg
  - Hamburg many Hanseatic cities issued their own ducats.
  - Saxony
- Hungary. The Hungarian mint still mints commemorative coins with 2, 3, 4 and 6-ducats quality.
- Italy
  - Duchy of Milan
  - Papal States
  - Duchy of Savoy
  - Kingdom of the Two Sicilies
  - Duchy of Urbino
  - Republic of Venice
  - Republic of Genoa
- Netherlands still issues golden and silver ducats having the same weight, composite and design when they were first minted in 1586.
- Poland (the historical Red złoty)
- Romania
  - Transylvania
  - Wallachia
- Russia imitated Dutch ducats due to their popularity. Also issued small quantities of Russian design.
- Scotland
- Kingdom of Serbia
- Spain, all through its domains, including Flanders, the Kingdom of Napoli and the Americas.
- Sweden
- Switzerland. Before the Swiss unification, the Swiss also minted ducats, the most well known of which are the Zürich ducats.
- Kingdom of Yugoslavia
