= Ducaton =

Crown-sized silver coin of the 16th-18th centuries

The ducaton, ducatone or ducatoon was a crown-sized silver coin of the 16th-18th centuries.

== History ==
The first ducaton-type coin was the scudo known as the 'ducatone da soldi cento' (of 100 soldo), issued by Charles V, Holy Roman Emperor, in Milan in 1551. Ducatones were produced in greater numbers in numerous Italian states through the 17th century, spreading to other parts of the Spanish Empire, including Burgundy and the Netherlands - in 1618 the ducaton was produced in Brabant and Tournai comprising 32.48 grams of 0.944 silver depicting Albert and Isabella.

== Silver rider ==
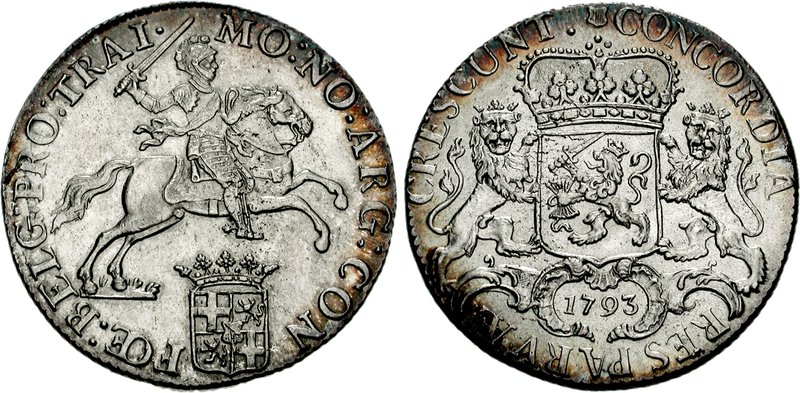
'Rider' ducaton, 1793, arms of Utrecht below the horse

In 1659 the Dutch states started production of the 'silver rider' ducaton, featuring a mounted knight on horseback. This design weighing 32.779 grams of 0.941 silver also featured the crowned arms of the United Netherlands on the reverse, with a shield below the knight indicating the province of minting. Rider ducatons were minted until 1798. In the period 1726-1751 ducatons were minted bearing the monogram of the Dutch East India Company.

As a trade coin the familiar design of the Dutch rider helped it to compete against well-known world coins such as the Spanish dollar. It was valued at 60 stuivers.

== See also ==
- History of coins in Italy
- The gold ducat.

Similar silver coins:

- Dutch rijksdaalder
- Spanish dollar
- Thaler
- The 3 guilder piece, a slightly lighter coin (31.82 grams) made of 0.92 silver. Minted from 1680 to 1832.
