= Agio =

Term used in commerce for exchange rate, discount or premium

Agio (Italian aggio) is a term used in commerce for exchange rate, discount or premium.

== Exchange rate ==
The variations from fixed par values or rates of exchange in the currencies of different countries. For example, in most countries that used the gold standard, the standard coin was kept up to a uniform point of fineness. In particular, a freshly minted English sovereign was in a fixed relation to freshly minted coins of other countries: 1 £ = 25.221 francs = 20.429 marks = US$4.867, etc.

This rate, known as the mint par of exchange, did not necessarily coincide with the corresponding market exchange rates. The balance of trade between the countries determined the actual rate of exchange. If England has a negative balance of trade with France, for instance, currency of equal magnitude is remitted to France, which thus creates a demand for French currency. Procurement of that currency involves payment of a premium referred to as agio. It refers to exchange rate.

== Exchange rate differential ==
The term was also used to denote the difference in exchange between two currencies in the same country where silver coinage was the legal tender. An agio was sometimes allowed for payment in the more convenient form of gold or where the paper currency value of a country fell below the bullion that it ostensibly represented.

== Premium ==
In the process of use, coinage deteriorates over time, and its value falls below the nominal value. To illustrate, suppose that this reduction in the value of the pound is 5%. Reflecting their nominal value, 100 sovereigns in England would be accepted as a payment in full for £100 debt. Payment of debt outside England is based, however, on the physical state of the coin. In this case each coin is valued as £0.95, and payment of £100 debt requires £100 / £0.95 = 105.26 coins thence an agio of 5.26 sovereigns.

== See also ==
- Currency
- Exchange rates
