= Trade coin =

Bullion coin minted for export

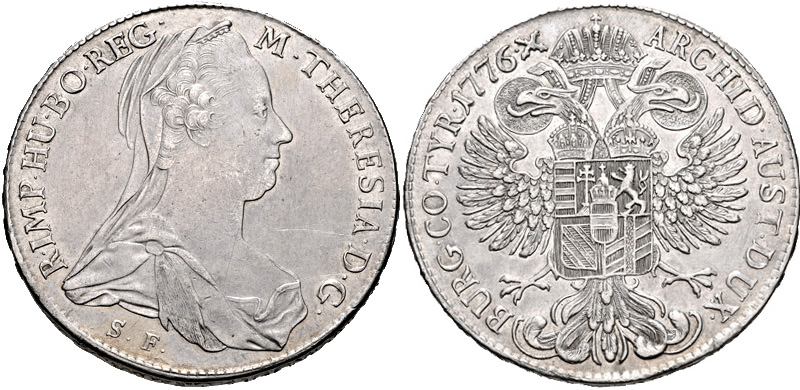
The Maria Theresa thaler from Austria is an example of a trade coin.

Trade coins are coins minted by a government, but not necessarily legal tender within the territory of the issuing country. These quasi-bullion coins (in rarer cases small change) were thus actually export goods – that is, bullion in the form of coins, used for the bulk purchase of important goods from other countries, where they could be bought at a favourable price, compared to the purchasing power of the same amount of bullion within the trade coins' country of origin.

A distinction must be drawn between full-value bullion trade coins, that were used in ordinary peacetime trade on the one hand, and on the other hand debased coins, that were usually made with the intention to deceive. Such debased "trade coins" were occasionally minted during times of war, e.g. the Prussian ephraimiten, silver-clad copper coins minted during the Seven Years' War. If these were ever accepted or approved as legal tender, they would be valued far below the regular coins, their value being calculated according to a specified formula. The conversion rates were even then usually significantly below the intrinsic value of the coins, to cover costs of melting and recoinage etc.

Since the 1920s there have been hardly any true trade coins, though some are still traded by coin collectors with a premium. Their role has now been taken over by (paper or electronic) United States dollars as, in some ways, a world currency.

== Examples ==
One of the most famous trade coins of the 18th century is the Austrian Maria Theresa thaler. Although dated 1780, it has been minted continuously in Austria well into the 21st century for sale to collectors. The Maria Theresa thaler was previously exported in large quantities to East Africa and the Middle East. It was so highly regarded in Africa that its purchasing power for goods and raw materials was higher there than in Austria.

In preparation for the slow transition to the gold standard in England between 1717 and 1816, in trade with the Prussians England preferred 5 and 10 thaler gold pieces (Friedrich d'or) in exchange for quality goods. The Friedrich d'or thus became a trade coin, while it was also current in Prussia itself (although with a decreasing exchange rate against the silver Reichstaler, see bimetallism).

The Hungarian and Dutch gold ducats, minted for centuries with a stable fineness, were esteemed trade coins. Other trade coins were the so-called silver trade dollars used by Mexico and the USA to buy South American or Chinese goods relatively cheaply. These countries mostly had a currency based on the silver standard or even a paper currency, and domestically set the value of silver too high even though the world market price of silver had long been lower.

== Bibliography ==
- (in German) Heinz Fengler u. Autoren: Lexikon Numismatik. transpress Verlag für Verkehrswesen, Berlin 1988, ISBN 3-344-00220-1
