= Financial history of the Dutch Republic =

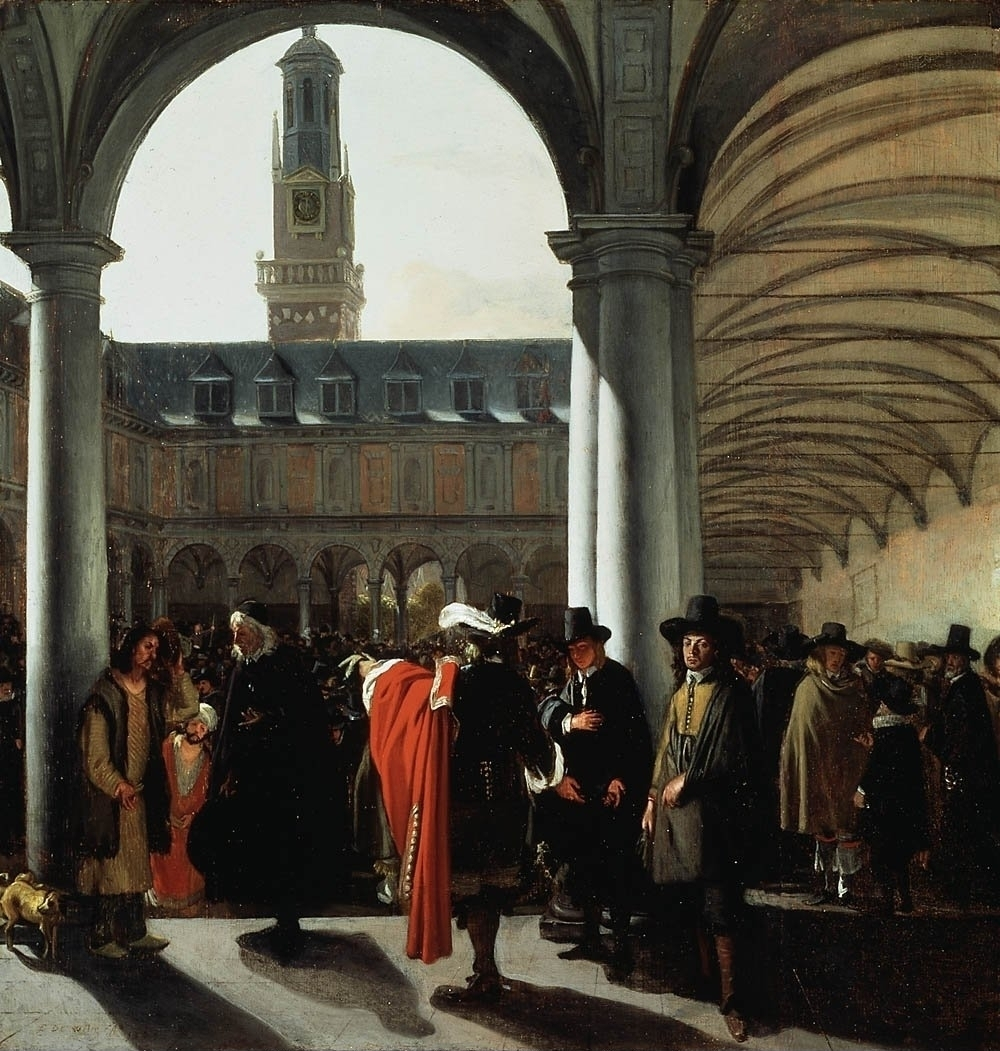
Courtyard of the Amsterdam Stock Exchange by Emanuel de Witte

The financial history of the Dutch Republic involves the interrelated development of financial institutions in the Dutch Republic. The rapid economic development of the country after the Dutch Revolt in the years 1585–1620 accompanied by an equally rapid accumulation of a large fund of savings, created the need to invest those savings profitably. The Dutch financial sector, both in its public and private components, came to provide a wide range of modern investment products beside the possibility of (re-)investment in trade and industry, and in infrastructure projects. Such products were the public bonds, floated by the Dutch governments on a national, provincial, and municipal level; acceptance credit and commission trade; marine and other insurance products; and shares of publicly traded companies like the Dutch East India Company (VOC), and their derivatives. Institutions like the Amsterdam Stock Exchange, the Bank of Amsterdam, and the merchant bankers helped to mediate this investment. In the course of time the invested capital stock generated its own income stream that (because of the high propensity to save of the Dutch capitalists) caused the capital stock to assume enormous proportions. As by the end of the 17th century structural problems in the Dutch economy precluded profitable investment of this capital in domestic Dutch sectors, the stream of investments was redirected more and more to investment abroad, both in sovereign debt and foreign stocks, bonds and infrastructure. The Netherlands came to dominate the international capital market up to the crises of the end of the 18th century that caused the demise of the Dutch Republic.

== Introduction ==
To fully understand the peculiarities of the history of the system of public finance, and that of the closely related system of private (international) finance and banking of the Dutch Republic, one has to view it in the context of the general history of the Netherlands and of its institutions, and of the general Economic History of the Netherlands (1500–1815).

Those general histories differ in an important way from those of centralized Western European monarchies, like Spain, France, England, Denmark and Sweden in the early modern era. The Netherlands were highly decentralized from their origins in the Habsburg Netherlands in the late 15th century, and (other than the monarchies just mentioned) successfully resisted attempts to bring them together under the centralized authority of a modern state. Indeed, the Dutch Revolt that gave rise to the Republic of the United Netherlands, effectively resulted from resistance against attempts by the representatives of king Philip II of Spain, the Habsburg ruler of the country, to institute such a centralized state and a centralized system of public finance. Where in other instances the modern fiscal system resulted from, and was made subservient to, the interests of a centralizing monarchical state, in the Dutch instance the emerging fiscal system was the basis of, and was mobilized in the interests of the defense of, a stubbornly decentralised political entity.

Ironically, the Habsburg rulers themselves pushed through the fiscal reforms that gave the rebellious provinces the wherewithal to resist the power of the sovereign. Emperor Charles V needed to increase the borrowing capacity of his government to finance his many military adventures. To that end it was necessary to put in place a number of fiscal reforms that would ensure that the public debt could be adequately serviced (thereby increasing the creditworthiness of his government). In 1542 the president of the Habsburg Council of State, Lodewijk van Schoor, proposed the levy of a number of taxes throughout the Habsburg Netherlands: a Tenth Penny (10 percent tax) on the income from real property and private loans, and excise taxes on beer, wine, and woollen cloth. These permanent taxes, collected by the individual provinces, would enable the provinces to pay enlarged subsidies to the central government, and (by issuing bonds secured by the revenue of these taxes) finance extraordinary levies (beden in old Dutch) in time of war. Other than expected, these reforms strengthened the position of the provinces, especially Holland, because as a condition of agreeing to the reform the States of Holland demanded and got total control of the disbursement of the taxes.

Holland was now able to establish credit of its own, as the province was able to retire bond loans previously placed under compulsion as enforced loans. By this it demonstrated to potential creditors it was worthy of trust. This brought a market for voluntary credit into being that previously did not exist. This enabled Holland, and other provinces, to float bonds at a reasonable interest rate in a large pool of voluntary investors.

The central government did not enjoy this good credit. On the contrary, its financing needs increased tremendously after the accession of Philip II, and this led to the crisis that caused the Revolt. The new Regent Fernando Álvarez de Toledo, 3rd Duke of Alba tried to institute new taxes to finance the cost of suppression of public disturbances after the Iconoclastic Fury of 1566 without going through proper constitutional channels. This brought about a general revolt in the Netherlands, particularly in the northern provinces. Those were able to withstand the onslaught of the royalist forces militarily, because of the fiscal basis they had built in previous years.

Of course, they now withheld the subsidies to the central government their taxes were supposed to finance. That central government was therefore forced to finance the war by transfers from other Habsburg lands, especially Spain itself. This led to an enormous increase in the size of the Spanish public debt, which that country was ultimately unable to sustain, and hence to the need to accept Dutch independence in 1648.

As explained in the general article on the economic history of the Netherlands, the political revolt soon engendered an economic revolution also, partly related to political events (like the rise of the Dutch East India Company and its West-Indies colleague), in other respects unrelated (like the revolutions in shipping, fisheries, and industry, that seem to be more due to technological innovations). This economic revolution was partly the cause of, and partly helped along further, by a number of fiscal and financial innovations that helped the Dutch economy make the transition to "modernity" in the early 17th century.

== Public finance ==
The "constitution" of the new Republic, the Union-of-Utrecht treaty of 1579, tried to lay the basis of a revolutionary new fiscal system. It put in place a rudimentary confederal budget system that charged the Raad van State (Council of State) with drafting an annual Staat van Oorlog (war budget). This budget was presented in a "General Petition" to the States-General for (unanimous) approval.

The treaty next required that the tax revenues for the financing of this budget would be levied "...equally in all united provinces, and at the same rate.". Furthermore, it prohibited internal tariffs and other taxes discriminating against residents of other provinces. Alas, these two latter provisions were never implemented. Instead, the provinces continued the practice under the Habsburg rulers that the provinces paid a fixed quotum (the repartitie) of the budget. Holland's contribution was the norm from which the contributions of other provinces were derived. After some changes the quota were fixed in 1616 as follows (to remain unchanged till 1792): Friesland one-fifth of Holland's share; Zeeland (after some diligent bargaining) 16 percent; Utrecht and Groningen one-tenth each; Gelderland 9.6 percent; Overijssel 6.1 percent; and Drenthe (though not represented in the States-General) 1 percent.

The States-General had only two direct sources of income: it taxed the Generality Lands directly, and the five Admiralties set up under its authority, financed their activities nominally from the Convooien en Licenten levied on trade. Otherwise, the provinces determined themselves how they would collect the revenues to finance their repartitie. Within the provinces there were other quota systems to determine the contributions of the cities and of the countryside. In Holland, the city of Amsterdam was by far the largest contributor (though this was different from Habsburg times, when Delft made the relatively largest contribution), which explained the influence that city wielded, even at the national level.

This system remained in place throughout the life of the Republic. Simon van Slingelandt made an attempt in 1716 to reform it by giving more power to the center. He convened the Groote Vergadering (a kind of constitutional convention) in that year, prompted by the fact that the Generality faced a liquidity crisis in 1715, when most provinces fell into arrears on their contributions. However, this august body rejected all reform proposals, opting instead for "muddling through". Ten years later Van Slingelandt was made Grand Pensionary of Holland, but on condition that he not press for constitutional reforms. Except for a reshuffling of the provincial quota in 1792, a real reform of the system had to wait till after the demise of the Republic. The public debt was consolidated on a national level in 1798, and the system of taxation only unified in 1806.

=== Taxation ===
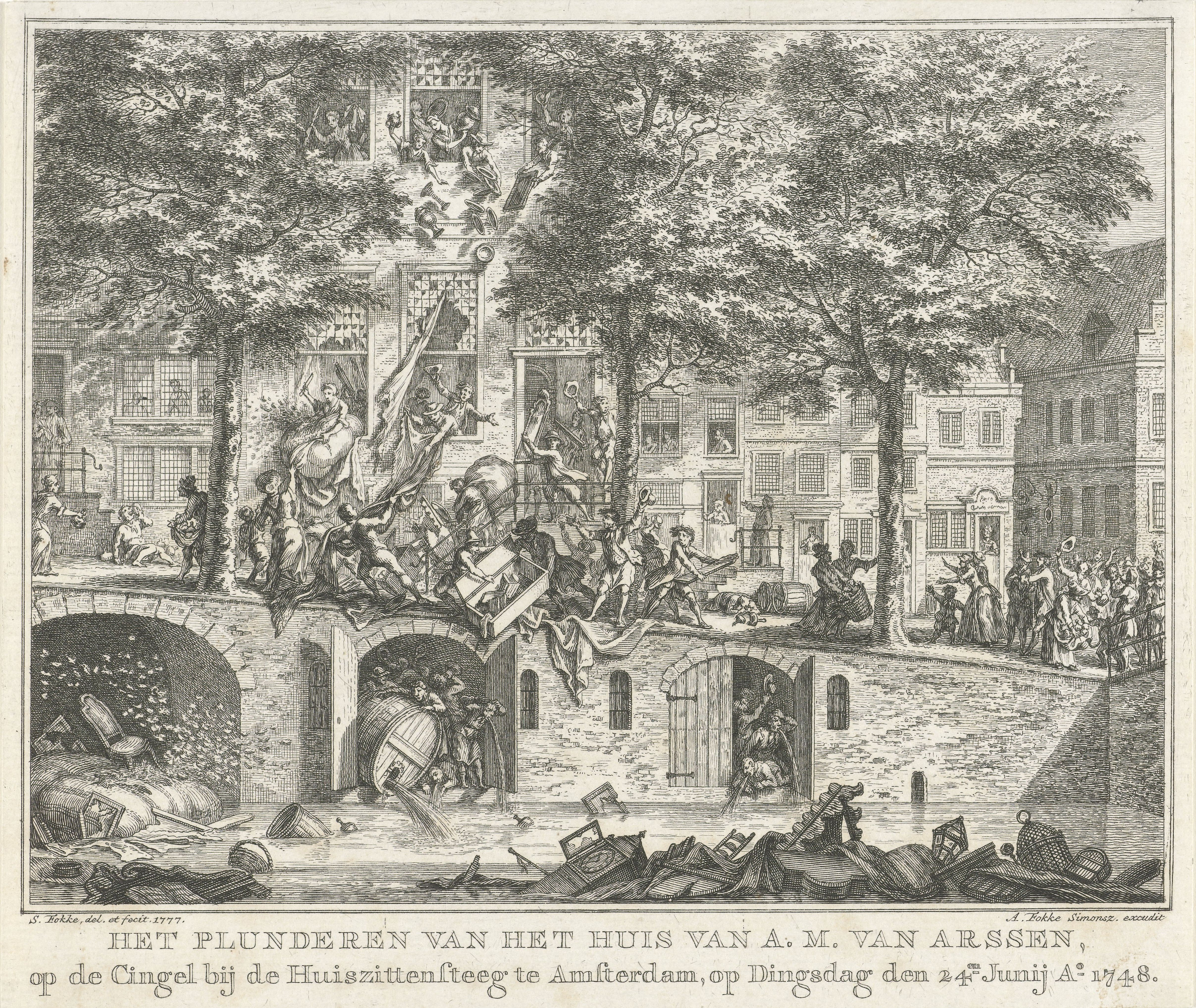
Pachtersoproer in Amsterdam, 1748

As Holland was the most important province, usually paying 58 percent of the total budget, it is probably useful to concentrate the discussion on this province (also because other provinces modeled themselves on the Holland system). It based its fiscal structure on the system inherited from the Habsburg era, mentioned above, but extended it in important respects.

The most important source of revenue, collectively known as gemene middelen (common means), were a set of excise taxes on first necessities, especially on beer, wine, peat, grain, salt, and the use of market scales. These were essentially transaction taxes, as they were levied at a fixed rate, not ad valorem (the revenue stamps introduced later in the 17th century basically fall in the same category as they tax transactions in commerce). In the 1630s this type of tax accounted for two-thirds of Holland's revenue. It then amounted to about ten guilders per capita (while per capita income for most people may have been much lower than the average of about 150 guilders a year). These taxes were levied on the seller of the good, who presumably passed them on to the consumer. They were collected by tax farmers, who bought their farms at auction, at least until the Pachtersoproer in 1748 put a stop to this practice. In Holland the real abuses of the system, though perceived to be great, may not have been as serious as the French abuses of the tax farms in that country. This was, because the tax farmers were numerous, low-status, and politically subordinate to the city Regenten, for which they formed a convenient barrier against popular discontent. Because of this weak position the Dutch tax farmers may have been less able than their French colleagues to exploit their privileges.

Though the excises were a heavy burden on the common man, at least in the first quarter of the 17th century, somewhat surprisingly this regressive taxation burden may have abated somewhat in later years. There were several factors for this. Many excises incorporated mitigating provisions, like exemptions and sliding scales, that reweighed their impact in the direction of higher-income people (like graduation of the beer tax according to quality; conversion of the grain and salt taxes to per-capita taxes on assumed consumption; a progressive tariff for the tax on household servants, and on weddings and burials, that may be seen as wealth taxes, as most people were exempt). Finally, the relative importance of these excises in total revenue declined in later years. It accounted for 83 percent of total revenue in 1650, but only 66 percent in 1790.

The types of tax that were next in importance were the real and personal property taxes like the verponding, a kind of rates. This amounted to 8.5 percent (the Twelfth Penny) of the rental value of all real property. This tax, first introduced in 1584, was based on assessments of land described in registers that were not updated. To remedy the problems resulting therefrom a new survey in 1632 resulted in new registers, and at this time the tax was fixed at 20 percent of land rents and 8.5 percent of house rental values, all levied on the landlords. Whether they passed these on was determined by economic conditions, of course.

Unfortunately, 1632 proved from hindsight to be a top year for property prices. As rents plunged after the middle of the century, the real burden of the verponding therefore increased sharply. Also, in the war years after 1672 extraordinary levies, up to three times a year, were often imposed, amounting to 100 percent of the normal verponding. Pressure for new assessments was therefore high, but in 1732, after a century, the registers were only revised for house rents. The loss of revenue was otherwise deemed to be unacceptable. Farmers had to wait for the lifting of the agricultural depression after 1740 for relief through higher incomes.

Finally, direct taxes on income and wealth were the third major pillar of the tax system in Holland. Due to the difficulty of assessing incomes, at first the emphasis was put here on taxes on capital, like the inheritance tax, and a number of forced loans that amounted to taxes. Income taxes were attempted in 1622, and again in 1715, but they proved impracticable. In 1742 Holland tried to impose the personeel quotisatie (whose registers offer a useful source to the social historian), which remained in force for eleven years, before it was abandoned. This was a progressive income tax, levied on incomes over 600 guilders (the highest quintile) at a rate, ranging from 1.0 to 2.5 percent.

Wealth taxes proved to be more feasible. The Hundredth and the Thousandth Penny were regularly levied on real and personal property (as distinguished from the income from property, like the verponding) from 1625. In the difficult years after 1672, when war required high repartities, extraordinary wealth taxes were imposed very frequently, amounting to a total levy of (theoretically) 14 percent of all real property, seigneurial rights, tithes, bonds, and personal objects of value. In 1674 Holland put this ad hoc taxation on a regular footing by founding a new register (the personele kohier). From then on the 100th and 200th penny could regularly be collected.

Finally, a curious predecessor of a tax like the dividend tax was the levying after 1722 of the 100th and 200th penny on the income from provincial bonds, which then replaced the general wealth tax just mentioned. This withholding tax proved to be very convenient, but had the unintended consequence that the effective yield of Holland bonds (other bonds were not taxed) was commensurately lowered. Holland therefore had to pay a higher rate on its bonds, which more or less defeated the purpose.

All these taxes imposed a considerable burden on the Dutch tax payer, compared to his contemporaries in neighboring countries. There were no exemptions for churchmen or aristocrats. The Republic had sufficient authority to have these burdens accepted by its citizens, but this was a function of the "bottom-up" implementation of the taxes. Municipal and provincial tax authorities possessed more legitimacy than central authorities, and this legitimacy was reinforced by the fact that the broad tax base enabled local authorities to tailor taxes to local circumstances. The taxation system thereby underpinned the federal structure of the Dutch state.

Other than for other provinces, a reasonably accurate picture can be sketched of developments in revenue and tax burden in the province of Holland. In the two decades of the Revolt after 1568, Holland's revenues exploded in a tenfold increase compared to pre-Revolt years, proving that Dutchmen were not opposed to paying taxes per se (despite the fact that they had started a revolution about Alva's taxes). The revenue kept growing after 1588, rising threefold in the period till 1630. However, the real per-capita tax burden remained constant in the years up to 1670. This reflected the tremendous economic growth in the Golden Age, on the one hand, and a rapid expansion of the tax base, commensurate with this growth, on the other hand.

As in the economy in general, there was a sharp break after 1672. Whereas the economy stagnated, expenditures in connection with the wars, and hence taxes too, rose. Taxes doubled by the 1690s, but nominal wages (as distinguished from real wages, which rose due to the general decline in price levels) remained constant. At the same time the tax base almost certainly shrank as a consequence of the economic decline. This resulted in a doubling of the per-capita tax burden. This development levelled off after the Peace of Utrecht in 1713, when the Republic entered a period of peace and neutrality (though there was a spike when it was dragged into the War of the Austrian Succession). However, it did not result in a reduction of the per-capita tax burden up to the final crisis of the Republic and its economy after 1780. Then that tax burden again sharply increased. Presumably, the other provinces globally followed these developments, though at a distance, because of their different economic circumstances.

Other than for Holland (for which more data are known) revenue figures for the Republic as a whole are available for 1716, when it amounted to 32.5 million guilders, and again for 1792 (when the repartitie-system was revised for the first time), when it came to 40.5 million (inflated) guilders. After 1795 the Batavian Republic collected regular revenue statistics. These figures allow the following observations: in 1790 the per-capita tax burden at the national level in the Republic was comparable to that in Great Britain, and twice that in France (which had just started a revolution about that tax burden). This reflected a rapid rise in tax burdens in both France and Great Britain during the 18th century in which both countries made up a large difference with the Republic (but also in income levels, of course). Extrapolating backward, the Dutch level of taxation in 1720 probably was double that of Britain. Dutch innovations like excises and stamp taxes were followed with a lag of a century in the larger countries.

The stagnation of the growth in the Dutch per-capita tax burden during the 18th century (while the Republic's rivals made up their arrears) may reflect both a lack of political will on the part of the authorities to exact higher burdens, and economic limits to taxation. The latter hypothesis is indirectly supported by the fact that after 1672 the tax system became far less regressive than before. Apparently, the common man was spared a further increase of his tax burden. Henceforth, "the rich" were burdened more severely by efforts at direct taxation, than during the Golden Age. However, this applied more to people rich in land and (provincial) bonds, than to people investing in commerce and foreign bonds. Source of income was therefore very important. This also contributed to the peculiar developments around the public debt in the 18th century.

=== Public debt ===
Usually, taxation and borrowing are seen as alternative means of financing public expenditures, at least if they are available with equal ease. Borrowing is sometimes inevitable when a spike in expenditures would necessitate an unsupportable spike in taxation otherwise. This was the usual justification for taking on public debt in the days of the Habsburg Netherlands, when the province of Holland built up an enviable public credit. Alas, in the first years of the Revolt this credit evaporated and Holland (let alone the Republic) was forced to increase taxation very strongly (as we have seen), partly by resorting to forced loans (which at least offered the solace of paying interest and holding out the hope of ultimate redemption). Voluntary loans were only to be had from people related to government (like the Prince of Orange) and from the Office of Ecclesiastical Property, the institution that managed the expropriated real property of the Roman Catholic Church. That office was charged with continuing the charitable works of the Church foundations, which it could conveniently do by selling its choice properties and investing the proceeds in interest-bearing public bonds.

At first the scarcity of funds available for public borrowing was no doubt due to pessimism about the prospects of the new state. However, soon a new reason of a more propitious nature was the explosive economic boom in trade of the 1590s and early 17th century, that required financing from private capital and offered far better returns than the measly 8.33 percent (12th penny) the state could pay. This competing demand for funds can be illustrated by the fact that most people voluntarily investing in public debt up to the Twelve Years' Truce (1609) were widows and orphans. Also the phenomenon of the emergence of a secondary market for forced loans, offered by some municipalities in Holland, which enabled merchants to free up their forced loans, and reinvest those in private ventures, points in this direction.

With the Truce more normal times arrived. The borrowing requirement went to zero with the arrival of the temporary peace and this probably helped the transition to voluntary lending. After the Truce ended in 1621 expenditures for war again rose steeply, but this time the Republic, and in particular Holland, had no trouble borrowing on average 4 million guilders annually, which helped keep down the rise in taxation that might otherwise have been necessary. By 1640 confidence in Holland's public debt (and the supply of funds available for borrowing) had risen so much, that a refinancing of the outstanding debt with a much lower interest rate of 5 percent was possible (followed in 1665 by a conversion to 4 percent).

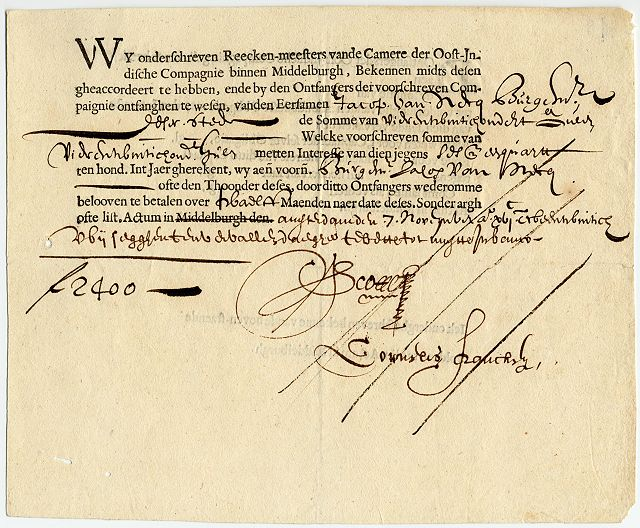
A bond from the Dutch East India Company, dating from 7 November 1623, for the amount of 2,400 florins; written out and authorized in Middelburg, but signed in Amsterdam

Provincial and municipal borrowers in these days issued three types of debt instrument:

- Promissory notes (called Obligatiën), a form of short-term debt, in the form of bearer bonds, that were readily negotiable;
- Redeemable bonds (called losrenten) that paid an annual interest to the holder, whose name appeared in a public-debt ledger (not as convenient as bearer bonds, but the bonds were still readily negotiable) until the loan was paid off;
- Life annuities (called lijfrenten) that paid interest during the life of the buyer, or nominee, whereas the principal is extinguished at his or her death (this type of debt was therefore self-amortizing).

Unlike other countries, where the markets for public debt were often mediated by bankers, in Holland the state dealt directly with prospective bondholders. The tax receivers doubled as registrars of the public debt. The receivers were also free to tailor bond offerings to local circumstances. They often issued many bonds of small coupon that were attractive to unsophisticated small savers, like craftsmen, and often women. This made for a kind of "popular capitalism", at least during the Golden Age of the 17th century, that often amazed foreign observers.

Lijfrenten paid a higher rate of interest than losrenten, which made them rather popular, the more so, because Holland at first did not make the interest dependent on the age of the nominee. It took no less an intellect than that of Grand Pensionary Johan de Witt to figure out that this omission made lijfrenten too expensive. This contribution to actuarial science also helped bring down the Dutch debt service appreciably.

In practice, however, by the middle of the 17th century the Dutch Republic enjoyed such good credit, that it was able to dispense with lijfrenten and finance its borrowing requirements with long-term redeemable bonds at rates that were equal to, or lower than, the lowest interest returns available in the private sector. In fact, redemption could often be postponed indefinitely, making such loans "interest-only". This enabled the Republic in practice to spend according to its needs without practical limit, greatly exceeding its short-term ability to tax. This greatly enhanced its politico-military power, as it was able to field mercenary armies equal in size to the armies of countries with much larger populations, like France and England.

The positive side of a well-managed public debt, like the Dutch one, is that it expands the purchasing power of the state in a timely fashion, without putting undue burdens on the tax payer. However, there are prices to pay. One of those prices is an appreciable redistributive effect, when via the debt service money is channelled from a large proportion of the population (the tax payers) to a much smaller number of bondholders. In the beginning (thanks also to the forced character of the lending) this effect was limited by the broad distribution of debt-holders across the population. In the course of the 17th century, however, bondholding became more concentrated. One of the reasons for this was that new bonds were often financed by reinvesting retained interest by existing bondholders. This effect increased commensurately with the increase of the debt and the debt service. It was reinforced by the fact that bondholders were thrifty people (a tendency possibly explainable by the Ricardian equivalence-theorem, though people at the time were of course unaware of this theoretical underpinning).

In the course of the final third of the 17th century, and especially of the 18th century, this concentration of the public debt in the hands of a few gave rise to the emergence of a rentier class that amassed an important proportion of total wealth in the Republic, thanks to this redistributive effect, and despite the often confiscatory levies on wealth of the 18th century described above. This development went hand in hand with the development of the public debt itself after 1672. During the second half of the Golden Age (especially the years 1650–1665) the borrowing requirements of commerce and the public sector fell short of the amount of savings supplied by the private sector. This may explain the boom in real estate of those years, that sometimes acquired a "bubble" character. However, after the beginning of the Franco-Dutch War of 1672 these savings were rechanneled to the public sector (explaining the collapse of the housing bubble at the same time). Nevertheless, the holders of this rapidly increasing public debt were still awash in cash, which explains the low interest rates in the years up to 1689. This availability of funds also helped finance the great expansion of the VOC (and of its debt) in these years.

With the great conflicts that started with the Glorious Revolution of 1688 (financed with a bank loan that a consortium of Amsterdam bankers threw together in three days) these markets tightened appreciably, however. Holland was now forced to reintroduce the unprofitable lijfrenten, and to resort to gimmicks like lottery bonds to entice lenders to buy its bonds. As the supply of funds from redemptions and retained earnings now fell short of government demand, these new loans must have been partially financed by disinvestments in the commercial, industrial and agricultural sectors of the economy (admittedly depressed in these years). By 1713 Holland's debt had reached a total of 310 million guilders, and that of the Generality of the Republic of 68 million (illustrating the relative preponderance of Holland in the Republic's finances). The debt service of this debt amounted to 14 million guilders. This exceeded the ordinary tax revenues of Holland. Most of this debt was now concentrated in the hands of only a relatively few families, that not so coincidentally also had privileged access to political office.

This conjuncture of factors (decision making in the hands of a political group that also owned the public debt, a debt that surmounted the ability of the economy to service it) explains in large part the "withdrawal" of the Republic as a Great Power after 1713. Once the reform proposals of Van Slingelandt, that might have provided a viable alternative by enhancing the financial capacity of the Dutch state, had been rejected by this conservative political class, there was simply no alternative to austerity in public finance, and dismantling the military power of the Republic (paying off the mercenaries and laying up the fleet). Due to adverse economic circumstances in the first decades of the 18th century even these austerity measures offered little solace in practice. The only effect was that at least the public debt did not grow during these years, but even this trend was reversed after the forced entry into the War of the Austrian Succession caused another spike in military outlays (unfortunately with little positive effect, in view of the disastrous outcome of this war for the Republic), and therefore a spike in the growth of the debt.

The levelling-off of the growth of the debt in the years before 1740, and again after 1750, caused a curious dilemma for the Dutch rentiers: they kept accumulating capital from bond redemptions and retained bond earnings, due to an undiminished high average propensity to save (though their wealth allowed them to wallow in luxury at the same time). However, there were few attractive investment opportunities for this new capital in the domestic Dutch economy: as explained in the article on the economic history of the Netherlands, structural problems militated against expansion of the private sector, and the public debt hardly expanded (even decreased after 1750). This development gave undeniable discomfort to Dutch investors. It presented them with two unenviable alternatives: hoarding (which apparently happened on an appreciable scale, leading to a large increase in the amount of money in circulation, while the velocity of circulation dropped), or investing abroad.

The rentiers therefore switched on a major scale to foreign direct investment, especially in infrastructure in Great Britain (where the Industrial Revolution of that country was about to begin, preceded by an agricultural revolution that needed financing), and also in public debt in that country. The Republic in this way for the first time in history became an international capital market, especially geared to foreign sovereign debt in the second half of the 18th century. By 1780 the net value of Dutch foreign government lending exceeded 350 million guilders, about two-thirds of which British government debt. This brought annual foreign earnings of 16 million guilders. After 1780, other than one might expect in view of the crises following that year, this trend sharply increased. This can only be explained by wholesale disinvestment in the Dutch economy, and reinvestment in especially foreign sovereign debt. Foreign investment probably doubled to 20 million guilders annually. The result was that Dutch residents held foreign debt instruments exceeding an estimated value of a billion guilders in 1795 (though other estimates are more conservative, the lower ones are still in the 650 million range).

== Banking and finance ==
=== Merchant banks and the international capital market ===
The remarkable growth of Dutch involvement with the international capital market, especially in the second half of the 18th century, was mediated by what we now would call merchant banks. In Holland these grew out of merchant houses that shifted their capital first from financing their own trade and inventories to acceptance credit, and later branched out specifically into underwriting and public offerings of foreign government bonds (denominated in Dutch guilders) in the Dutch capital markets. In this respect the domestic and foreign bond markets differed appreciably, as the Dutch government dealt directly with Dutch investors (as we have seen above).

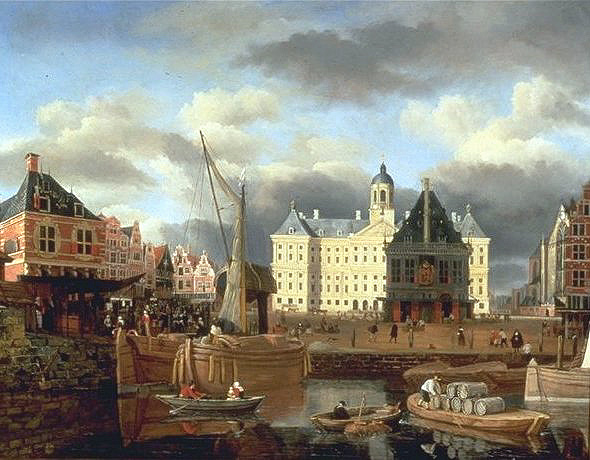
Amsterdam City Hall, Source: Amsterdam Municipal Department for the Preservation and Restoration of Historic Buildings and Sites (bMA)

Dutch involvement with loans to foreign governments had been as old as the Republic. At first such loans were provided by banking houses (as was usual in early-modern Europe), with the guarantee of the States General, and often also subsidized by the Dutch government. An example is the loan of 400,000 Reichstalers to Gustavus Adolphus of Sweden around 1620 directly by the States General. When the king could not fulfill his obligations, the Amsterdam merchant Louis de Geer agreed to assume the payments in exchange for Swedish commercial concessions (iron and copper mines) to his firm. Similar arrangements between Dutch merchants and foreign governments occurred throughout the 17th century.

The transition to more modern forms of international lending came after the Glorious Revolution of 1688. The new Dutch regime in England imported Dutch innovations in public finance to England, the most important of which was the funded public debt, in which certain revenues (of the also newly introduced excises after the Dutch model) were dedicated to the amortization and service of the public debt, while the responsibility for the English debt shifted from the monarch personally, to Parliament. The management of this debt was entrusted to the innovatory Bank of England in 1694.This in one fell swoop put the English public debt on the same footing of creditworthiness in the eyes of Dutch investors, as the Dutch one. In the following decades wealthy Dutch investors invested directly in British government bonds, and also in British joint-stock companies like that Bank of England, and the Honourable East India Company. This was facilitated as after 1723 such stock, and certain government bonds, were traded jointly on the London and Amsterdam Stock Exchanges.

But this applied to a safely controlled ally like England. Other foreign governments were still deemed "too risky" and their loans required the guarantee, and often subsidy, of the States General, as before (which helped to tie allies to the Dutch cause in the wars against France). After 1713 there was no longer a motivation for the Dutch government to extend such guarantees. Foreign governments therefore had to enter the market on their own. This is where the merchant banks came in, around the middle of the 18th century, with their emmissiebedrijf or public-offering business. At first, this business was limited to British and Austrian loans. The banks would float guilder-denominated bonds on behalf of those (and later other) governments, and create a market for those bonds. This was done by specialist brokers (called entrepreneurs) who rounded up clients and steered them to the offerings. The banks were able to charge a hefty fee for this service.

The rapid growth of foreign investment after 1780 (as seen above) coincided with a redirection of the investment to governments other than the British. Many Dutch investors liquidated their British portfolios after the Fourth Anglo-Dutch War (which immediately resulted in a rise in British interest rates) and reinvested in French, Spanish, Polish (an especially bad choice in view of the coming Partitions of Poland), and even American government loans. The appetite for such placements abated a little after the first defaults of foreign governments (like the French in 1793), but even under the Batavian Republic (which itself absorbed the bulk of available funds after 1795) investment in foreign funds did not fall-off completely. This may have been because Dutch investors did not always realize the riskiness of this type of investment. They were often badly served by the merchant banks, who had a vested interest in protecting their sovereign clients to the detriment of the bondholders. This is also indicated by the very slight agio of the interest rate of these risky loans over that for domestic bonds.

This apparent credulity on the part of the Dutch bondholders resulted in serious losses in the final years of the independent state, and during the annexation to France. The Dutch state for the first time in centuries defaulted after that annexation (a default that the new Kingdom of the Netherlands continued after the Netherlands became independent again in 1813). This tiercé (a dividing of the debt into two parts repudiated debt and one part recognized debt) followed the earlier repudiation of the French debt that had also devastated Dutch bondholders that had switched into French debt shortly before. The losses in the period 1793 to 1840 may have totalled between one-third and one-half of Dutch wealth.

=== The Wisselbanken ===
International payments have always posed a problem in international trade. Though exchange rate risks were less in the era in which the intrinsic value of money was usually equal to the face value (at least absent debasement of the coin, of course), there was the problem of the risk and inconvenience of transporting money or specie. An early innovation was therefore the bill of exchange (called wisselbrief in Dutch, or wissel for short), which obviated the need to transport coins in payment. After the development of this financial instrument by Italian and later Iberian merchants and bankers, Antwerp added a number of legal innovations in the mid-16th century that enhanced its value as such an instrument appreciably. These were assignment, endorsement, and discounting of bills of exchange. The Antwerpse Costuymen (commercial laws of Antwerp), which were adapted in Amsterdam from 1597, allowed unlimited chains of endorsement. This may have been convenient, but it increased the risk of default with each additional endorsement in the chain. For that reason the Amsterdam city government prohibited this practice.

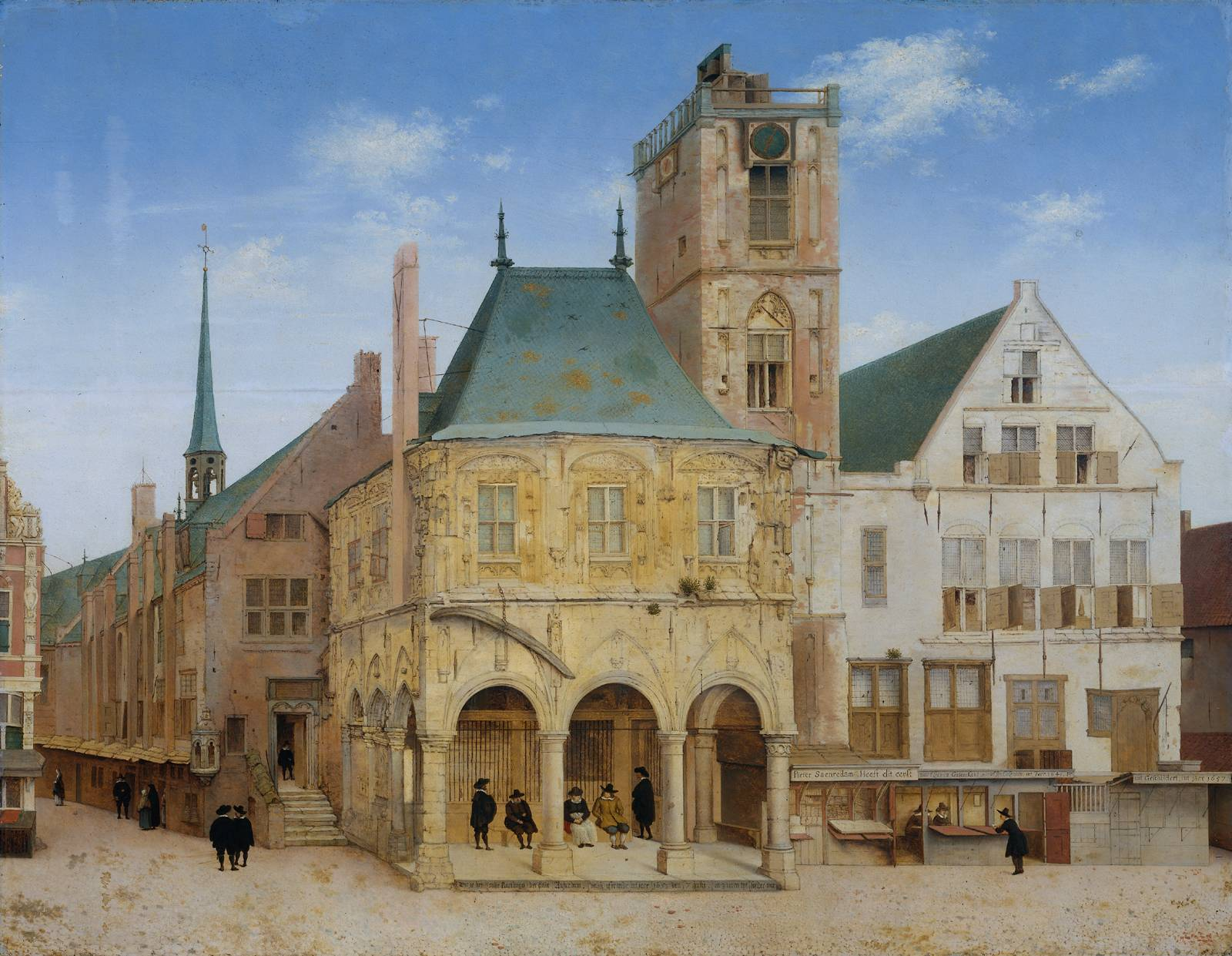
The Old Town Hall of Amsterdam (by Pieter Saenredam with Wisselbank

Instead, in 1609 a new municipal institution was established (after the example of the Venetian Banco della Piassa di Rialto, established in 1587) in the form of the Amsterdamsche Wisselbank, also called the Bank of Amsterdam. This bank (with offices in the City Hall) took deposits of foreign and domestic coin (and after 1683 specie), effected transfers between such deposit accounts (the giro function), and accepted (i.e. paid) bills of exchange (the more important of which – over 600 guilders in value – could now be endorsed – to the bank – only once). The latter provision effectively forced Amsterdam merchants (and many foreign merchants) to open accounts with this bank. Though Amsterdam established the first such bank in Holland, other cities, like Delft, Middelburg, and Rotterdam, followed in due course. The Amsterdam establishment was, however, the most important and the best known.

The giro function had the additional advantage (beside the obvious convenience) that the value of the underlying deposit was guaranteed. This was important in an era in which Metallism still reigned supreme. As a matter of fact, depositors were prepared to pay a small "fee" in the form of an agio for this "bank money" or bankgeld (which was an early example of fiat money) over normal circulating coin, called courantgeld. Though the wisselbank was not a mint, it provided coins deposited with it for melting and recoining at Dutch mints in the form of a high-quality currency, called "trade money" (or negotiepenningen in Dutch). These coins were used in trade with areas where the Dutch and other West Europeans had a structural trade deficit, like the Far East, Russia and the Levant, because they were highly valued there for their quality as commodity money.

These trade coins were distinguished from the circulating currency (Dutch: standpenningen) that after the reform of the currency of 1622, that allowed the minting of coins with a lower-than-face-value metal content, had the character of fiat money. This development recognized the reality that most money in circulation had a fiduciary character. Toward the end of the 17th century the Republic became (thanks to its general balance-of-trade surplus, and the policy of the Wisselbank) a reservoir of coin and bullion, which was regularly (re-)minted as trade coin, thereby "upgrading" inferior circulating money.

Unlike the later Bank of England, the Bank of Amsterdam did not act as a lender of last resort. That function was, however, performed by other institutions in the course of the history of the Republic, be it on a rather ad hoc basis: during financial crises in the second half of the 18th century lenders of last resort were briefly brought into being, but liquidated soon after the crisis had abated. The function of bank of issue was often performed by small private operations, called kassiers (literally: "cashiers") that accepted courantgeld for deposit, and issued promissory notes for domestic payments. These notes functioned as an early type of paper money. The same went after 1683 for the Bank of Amsterdam when its receipts for foreign coin and bullion were accepted as fiduciary money.

Those kassiers engaged also in fractional-reserve banking, as did the other wisselbanken outside Amsterdam, though this "risky" practice was officially frowned upon. During the crisis of 1672 the Middelburg wisselbank, that had actively lent deposited funds to local businessmen, faced a bank run which forced it to suspend payments for a while. The Amsterdam wisselbank, at least at first, officially did not engage in this practice. In reality it did lend money to the city government of Amsterdam and to the East-India Company, both solid credit risks at the time, though this was technically in violation of the bank's charter. The loophole was that both debtors used a kind of anticipatory note, so that the loans were viewed as advances of money. This usually did not present a problem, except when during the Fourth Anglo-Dutch War the anticipated income did not materialize, causing a liquidity crisis for both the bank and its debtors.

Another important business for Dutch bankers was foreign exchange trading. The bills of exchange originated in many countries and specified settlement in many different foreign currencies. Theoretically the exchange rates of these currencies were fixed by their intrinsic values, but (just as in modern times) trade fluctuations could cause the market exchange rate to diverge from this intrinsic rate. This risk was minimized, however, at Amsterdam, because the freedom there to export and import monetary metals tended to stabilize the exchange rates. Besides, Dutch merchants traded all over the known world and generated bills of exchange all over. This helped to generate regular exchange-rate quotations (an important information function) with many foreign locations. For these reasons Amsterdam attracted a business in bills of exchange that went far beyond the needs of its own already appreciable business. Merchants from many Mediterranean countries (where exchange rates with northern currencies were seldom quoted) bought bills on Amsterdam, where other bills on the intended final destinations could be acquired. Even London merchants long relied on the Amsterdam money market, especially for the English trade on Russia, at least till 1763.

In sum, most "modern" banking practices were already present in the Republic, and often exported abroad (like the fractional banking practices of the predecessor of the Swedish Riksbanken, the Stockholms Banco, founded by Dutch financier Johan Palmstruch; and later the Bank of England). They were, however, often not institutionalized on a "national" level, due to the stubbornly confederal nature of the Republic. For this reason the Netherlands only in 1814 got a formal central bank.

=== Commercial credit and insurance ===
As explained in the general article on the economic history of the Netherlands under the Republic, the Dutch entrepôt function was very important. One of the reasons Amsterdam was able to win this function after the Fall of Antwerp was the commercial credit offered to suppliers and buyers, usually as part of the discount on the bill of exchange. By prolonging and rolling-over such short-term credits, suppliers and customers could easily be tied to the entrepôt. The low interest rates usually prevailing in the Republic made the maintenance of large inventories feasible, thereby enhancing Amsterdam's reputation as the world's Emporium.

Though this commercial credit was originally tied to the trading operation of merchant firms, the sheer scope of the entrepôt created the opportunity for the trading in bills apart from this direct business, thereby serving third parties, even those not doing direct business with the Netherlands. Two kinds of financial trading, divorced from commercial trading, began to emerge by the beginning of the 18th century: trading on commission, and accepting houses. The first consisted of trading of agents (called commissionairs) on behalf of other merchants for a commission. Their role was therefore intermediation between buyers and sellers, leaving the conclusion of the business to those parties themselves.

The second consisted in guaranteeing payment on bills of exchange from third parties. If the third party issuing the bill would default, the accepting house would pay the bill itself. This guarantee of course was provided for a fee. This service need not have any connection with Dutch traders, or even with the Dutch entrepôt. It served international trade in general. Though this divorce between credit provision and trade has been interpreted as undermining Dutch trade itself in the age of relative decline of Dutch commerce, it probably was just a defensive move in a time of increasing foreign competition, protecting a share for Dutch commerce, and providing another outlet for commercial capital that would otherwise have been idle. The size of this business was estimated to be about 200 million guilders around 1773.

Much lending and borrowing of course occurred outside the formal economy. Unfortunately, it is difficult to document the size of this informal business. However, the archived registers of the notaries form an important source of information on this business, as those notaries acted as intermediaries bringing lenders and borrowers together (not least in the mortgage-loan business). Also, probate inventories, describing the estate of deceased persons, show the intricate web of credit transactions that occurred on a daily basis in the Republic, even between its humblest citizens.

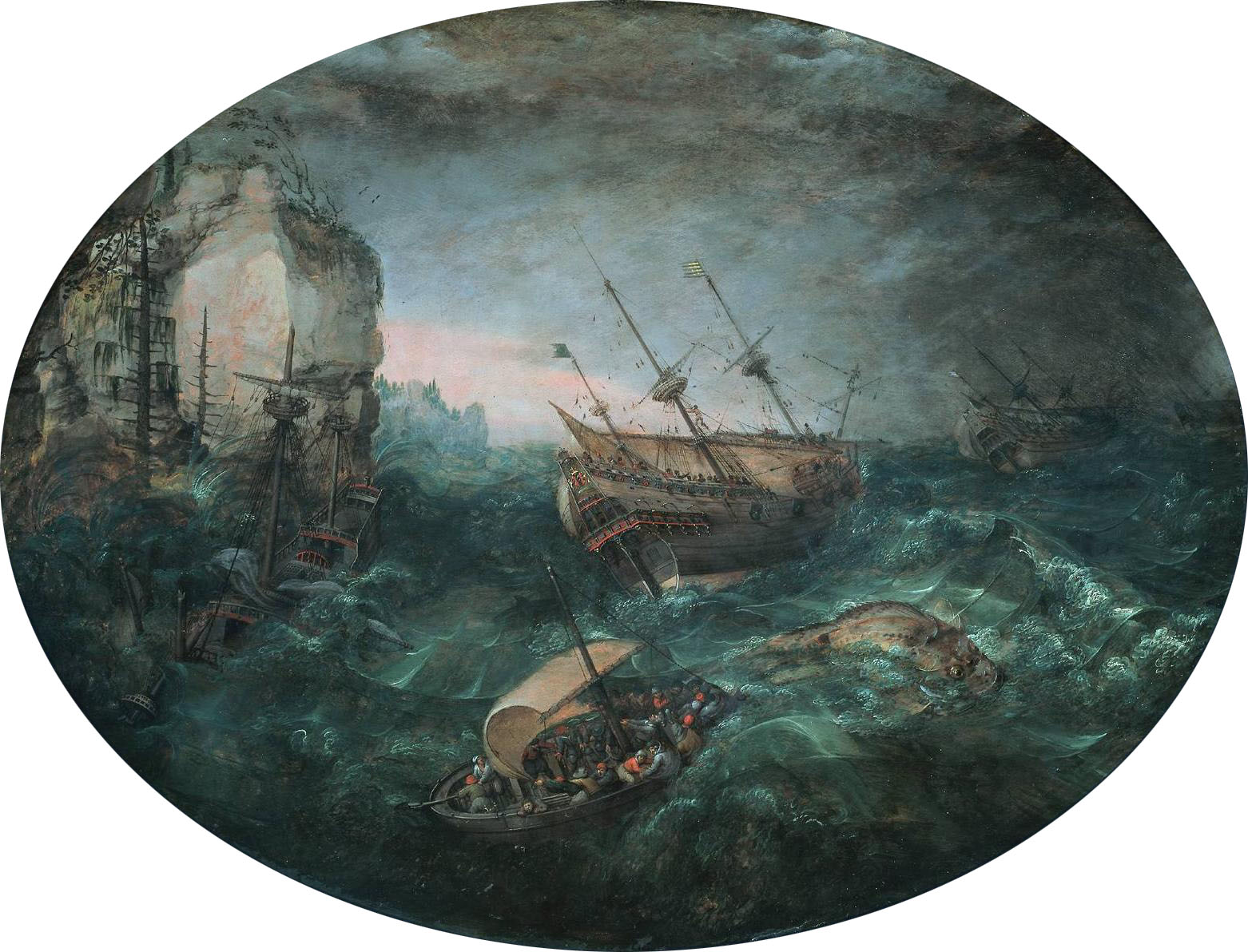
Shipwreck off a rocky coast by Adam Willaerts

Mercantile trade brought risks of shipwreck and piracy. Such risks were often self-insured. The East-India Company armed its vessels, and maintained extensive military establishments abroad, thereby internalizing protection costs. Arming merchantmen was quite usual in those days. However, the type of cargo vessel most often used by the Dutch, the Fluyt ship, went usually without guns, or was but lightly armed. This made ship and crew vulnerable to capture by Dunkirk privateers and Barbary pirates. In the latter case captured crews were often sold as slaves. To finance the ransoming of these slaves so-called slavenkassen (slave treasuries) were set up with the support of the government, some of which still exist as charitable foundations, like the one in Zierikzee.

Other examples of self-insurance were the partnerships of ship owners, known as partenrederijen (which is probably best translated as "managed partnership", although these were precursors of joint stock companies). These spread the financial risks over a large number of investors, the participanten. This type of business organization was not limited to ship owning, of course. Investment in windmills and trekschuiten often took this form also.

But insurance was also formalized as a contractual business, first offered by merchants as part of their normal trade, later by specialized insurers. This type of business started with marine insurance. In 1598 (three years before a similar institution was established in England) the city of Amsterdam instituted a Kamer van Assurantie en Avarij (Chamber of Marine Insurance) which was charged with regulating this business. This drew on the example of Antwerp where this business had been going on for a long time before that. From 1612 on the Assuradeuren (insurance brokers) had their own corner in the Amsterdam stock exchange, where they offered policies on hulls and cargoes to many different destinations. From 1626 the prijscourant (offering stock and bond prices) of the Dutch stock exchanges offered quotations for ten destinations. A century later that number had grown to 21. A large number of private firms insured domestic and foreign shipping alike, making Amsterdam Europe's principal center for marine insurance until the third quarter of the 18th century. One of these companies, founded during the 1720 Dutch financial Bubble (related to the English and French bubbles of the same year) as the Maatschappij van Assurantie, Discontering en Beleening der Stad Rotterdam has been continuously doing business as an insurance firm, Stad Rotterdam Verzekeringen, to this day.

These marine insurers at the end of the 18th century branched out to fire insurance. However, that type of insurance had already been pioneered at the end of the 17th century by a remarkable mutual insurance company of owners of paper-making windmills, called the Papiermakerscontract, though other types of industrial windmills were also admitted. The first known such policy dates from 1694. In 1733 no less than 72 windmills were insured with an insured value of 224,200 guilders. The company remained in business till 1903.

Another form of insurance that was popular from time to time was life insurance. However, private insurance companies could usually not compete with government life annuities when the government was active in this market. We therefore see this activity only in the period between 1670 and 1690, when Holland suspended the issuance of lijfrenten, and again after 1710, when the province again withdrew from this market. After 1780 the French government started to dominate this market with its life annuities. The private life-insurance contracts often took the form of group investment pools that paid pensions to nominees. A peculiar feature was often a tontine format that offered windfall profits to surviving nominees. In the 18th century these pools were marketed and controlled by brokers, which gave them a professional character.

== The stock market ==
Bringing together the savers that accumulated the growing stock of capital in the Republic and the people that needed that capital, like the Dutch and other governments, merchants, industrialists, developers etc. constitutes the formation of a market in the abstract economic sense. This does not require a physical meeting place in principle, but in early modern times markets commonly did come together at certain places. This was necessary, because the main function of a market is the exchange of information (about prices offered and accepted) and in the absence of means of telecommunication people had to meet in the flesh to be able to do that. In other words, abstract markets in the economic sense still had to be linked to physical markets. This applied as well to markets for commodities, as to financial markets. Again, there is no reason why financial markets and commodity markets should share the same physical space, but again, due to the close linkage of trade and finance, they in practice invariably did. We therefore see financial markets emerging in the places where commodities were also traded: the commodity exchanges.

Commodity exchanges probably started in 13th-century Bruges, but they quickly spread to other cities in the Netherlands, like Antwerp and Amsterdam. Because of the importance of the trade with the Baltic area, during the 15th and 16th centuries, the Amsterdam exchange became concentrated on the trade in grain (including grain futures and forwards and options) and shipping. In the years before the Revolt this commodity exchange was subordinate to the Antwerp exchange. But when the Antwerp entrepôt came to Amsterdam the commodity exchange took on the extended functions of the Antwerp exchange also, as those were closely linked.

What changed the Amsterdam commodity exchange to the first modern stock exchange was the evolvement of the Dutch East India Company (VOC) into a publicly traded company. It is important to make a few distinctions here to avoid a number of common misunderstandings. The VOC has been called the first joint-stock company, but this is only true in a loose sense, because its organization only resembled an English joint-stock company, but was not exactly the same. Like other Dutch merchant ventures, the VOC started out in 1602 as a partenrederij, a type of business organization that had by then already a long history in the Netherlands. As in the joint-stock company the investors in a rederij owned shares in the physical stock of the venture. They bore a part of the risk of the venture in exchange for a claim on the profits from the venture.

A number of things were new about the VOC, compared to earlier Dutch companies: its charter gave it a monopoly in the trade on the East Indies, and other than in earlier partenrederijen the liability of the managing partners was limited to their share in the company, just like that of the silent partners. But the innovation that made the VOC really relevant for the history of the emergence of stock markets came about serendipitously, not as part of its charter, but because of a decision by the managing partners in the early years of the company to disallow the withdrawal of paid-in capital by partners. As this had been a right of shareholders in other such partnerships it necessitated a feasible alternative for the direct liquidation of the interest of shareholders in the company. The solution was to enable shareholders that wished to get out to sell their share on the Amsterdam Stock Exchange that had just got a new building, but otherwise was just the continuation of the commodity exchange that existed beforehand.

Shares were still registered by name in the VOC's register, and that transfer of shares was effected by an entry in that register, witnessed by the company's directors. Such transfers were allowed at infrequent opportunities (usually when a dividend was paid). The "shares" that are presented as "the world's first shares" therefore were in reality what we now would call either stock certificates or else stock options (depending on the concrete circumstances). This secondary market in VOC stock proved quite successful. The paid-in capital of the company, and hence the number of shares, remained the same during the life of the company (about 6.5 million guilders), and when the company proved to be very successful the demand for its shares drove up their price till they reached 1200 percent in the 1720s. Remarkably, the VOC did not raise new capital by issuing new shares, but it relied on borrowing and retained profits for the financing of its expansion. This is remarkable, because previous ventures on the contrary did not borrow, but used additional subscriptions if they needed extra capital

The real innovation therefore was that next to physical commodities henceforth financial rights in the ownership of a company were traded on the Amsterdam exchange. The stock market had come into being. Soon other innovations in financial trading were to follow. A disgruntled investor, Isaac Le Maire (father of Jacob Le Maire), in 1609 initiated financial futures trading, when he tried to engineer a bear market in VOC shares by short selling them. This is the first known conspiracy to drive down share prices (as distinguished from manipulating, and speculating in, commodity prices). The Dutch authorities prohibited short selling the next year, but the frequent renewal of this prohibition indicates that it was usually honored in the breach.

By the middle of the 17th century, many "modern" derivatives apparently already were quite common, as witnessed by the publication in 1688 of Confusion de Confusiones, a standard work on stock-trading and other financial-market practices, used on the Amsterdam stock exchange, by the Jewish Amsterdam banker Joseph Penso de la Vega. In it he describes the whole gamut, running from options (puts and calls), futures contracts, margin buying, to bull and bear conspiracies, even some form of stock-index trading.

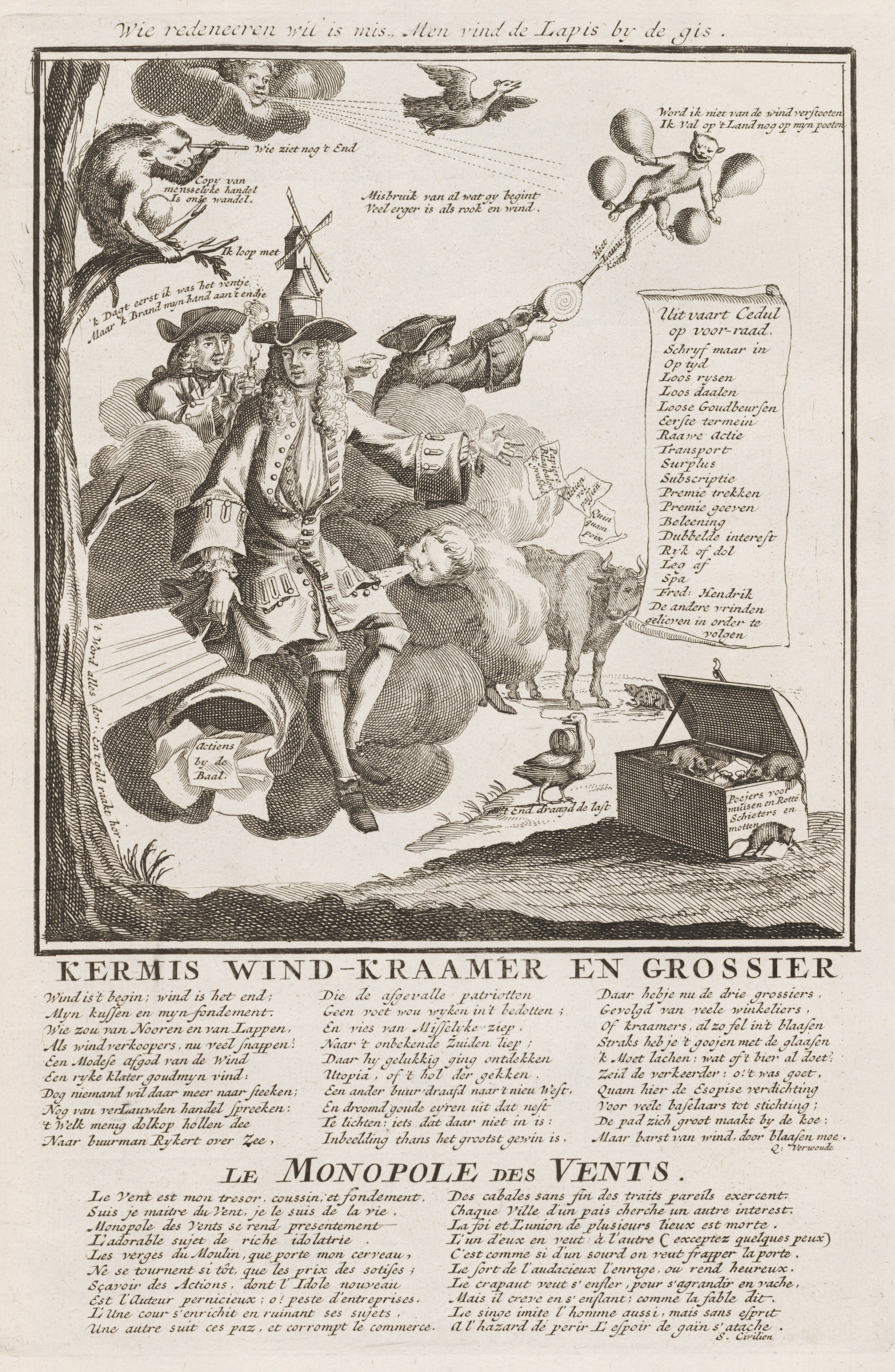
Cartoon about John Law and the Windhandel (1720)

Trading in financial instruments, let alone speculation, was not limited to the stock exchange, however. Notorious is the speculative bubble in tulip futures, known as the 1637 Tulip mania. This mostly unfolded in coffee houses throughout the country as a pastime for common people. The stock exchange and its brokers were hardly involved, though the techniques used were quite common on the stock exchange.

Similarly, the Dutch speculative bubble of 1720 (that coincided with John Law's activities in France and the South Sea bubble in England, but had its own peculiarities), for a large part existed outside the formal confines of the stock exchange. Still, this pan-European speculative mania illustrates the way in which by that time the European capital markets were already interconnected. The London Stock Exchange did not yet exist as a separate building, but its precursor operated in the Change Alley, where licensed stock traders did their business in coffee houses. Since the Glorious Revolution the Dutch and English stock exchanges operated in tandem, certain stocks and bonds being quoted on both exchanges. English shares of the Bank of England and the British East India Company were continuously traded in both London and Amsterdam. They communicated via the packet-boat connection between Harwich and Hellevoetsluis that sailed twice a week. Information on stock and bond prices in both markets was regularly published in Dutch price courants (that originated in Amsterdam in 1583, and were published biweekly from 1613 on).

Analysis of the information from these lists shows that the London quotations were apparently spot prices, whereas the Amsterdam quotations were forward prices, reflecting the fact that Amsterdam traded futures on English stocks. Of course, this need not signify stock speculation, but when the British and French speculative bubbles of 1720 erupted, the Dutch capital market soon got involved also, because Dutch investors were able to participate. The main Dutch bubble came afterward, however. When the bubble burst in France, short-term capital fled to the Netherlands, because this market was seen as a "safe haven". This influx of liquidity helped spark a domestic Dutch speculative bubble in dodgy public companies that burst in due course. Without the dire consequences of the British and French crashes, however, because the Dutch market was more mature. It occasioned a lot of satirical comment, however, as shown in the illustration from a contemporary tract on the follies of speculation, Het Groote Tafereel der Dwaasheid (English Translation: The Great Mirror of Folly).

The great import of this episode is that it shows that by this time the capital market had become truly international, not only for long-term bonds, but now also for short-term capital. Financial crises easily propagated because of this. Examples are the crisis of 1763, after the end of the Seven Years' War in which the Netherlands had remained neutral, occasioned a collapse of commodity prices, and debasements of the currency in Eastern Europe disrupted the bullion trade. Some Amsterdam accepting houses became overextended and failed as a consequence. This caused a brief credit crunch. Ten years later the bursting of a speculative bubble in British-East-India-Company stock, and a simultaneous default of Surinam planters, forced Dutch merchant bankers to liquidate their positions. As a result, acceptance credit evaporated temporarily, causing another credit crunch which brought down a number of venerable banking houses. This time a short-lived Fonds tot maintien van publiek crediet (a kind of bank of last resort) was erected by the city of Amsterdam, but dissolved again after the crisis abated. This experiment was repeated a few times during the crises of the end of the century, but equally without lasting results. The need for them was probably less than abroad, because the Dutch citizens were still extremely liquid, and possessed large cash hoards that obviated the need for a lender of last resort. Besides, the by then extremely conservative Dutch financial community feared that a paper currency beside the metal currency would undermine confidence in the Amsterdam capital market.

== Collapse of the system ==
Though the 18th century has often been depicted as an age of decline of the Dutch economy, the picture is more nuanced. It is true that the "real" economy of trade and industry (and initially agriculture also, though there was a resurgence later in the century) went into at least relative decline, compared to neighboring countries. But it has to be admitted that those neighboring countries had to make up a big lag, which they actually only accomplished toward the end of the 18th century, when British per-capita GNP finally overtook the Dutch per-capita GNP. Meanwhile, within the Dutch economy there was a decided shift toward the "service" sector (as the British economy would experience a century or so later), especially the financial sector.

At the time (and by later historians with an ax to grind) this shift was often evaluated negatively. Making money from money, instead of from toil in trade or industry was seen as a lazy-bones' pursuit. The "periwig-era" has become a byword for fecklessness in Dutch historiography. The 18th-century investors are seen as shunning risk by their overreliance on "safe" investments in sovereign debt (though those proved extremely risky from hindsight), while on the other hand they are excoriated for their predilection for speculative pursuits. But do those criticisms hold up under closer scrutiny?

First of all it has to be admitted that many modern economies would kill for a financial sector like the Dutch one of the 18th century, and for a government of such fiscal probity. In many respects the Dutch were unwittingly just ahead of their time. Their "speculative pursuits" are now seen as a necessary and integral part of commodity and financial markets, which perform a useful function in cushioning external shocks. It is as well that the Dutch performed that function for the wider European economy.

It is true, however, that the way the 18th-century financial sector worked had its drawbacks in practice. A very important one was the detrimental effect the large Dutch public debt after 1713 had on the distribution of income. Through its sheer size and the attendant size of the necessary debt service, which absorbed most of the tax revenue, it also cramped the discretionary spending possibilities of the government, forcing a long period of austerity on it, with its attendant "Keynesian" negative effect on the "real" economy. The structurally depressed economy this caused made investment in trade and industry unattractive, which reinforced the vicious circle leading to more foreign direct investment.

In itself such foreign investment is not seen as a bad thing nowadays. At least it engenders a foreign-income stream that helps the balance of payments of a country (though it also helped keep the Dutch guilder "hard" in a time when exports were already hindered by high real-wage costs). Unfortunately, the signals the market for foreign investments sent to Dutch investors were misleading: the very high risk of most foreign sovereign debt was insufficiently clear. This allowed foreign governments to exploit Dutch investors, first by paying interest rates that were far too low in hindsight (there was only a slight agio for foreign bonds), and finally by defaulting on the principal in the era of the Napoleonic Wars. As John Maynard Keynes has remarked: after the default of foreign borrowers the lending country has nothing, while after a domestic default the country has at least the physical stock that was bought with the loan. The Dutch were to experience this vividly after 1810.

In any case, the periwigged investors had in certain respects no choice when they shifted to acceptance credit and commission trade, for instance. This can be seen as a rational "second best" strategy when British, French and Spanish protectionism closed markets to the Dutch, and they lacked the military means to force retraction of protectionist measures (as they had often been able to do in the 17th century). Also, apart from protectionism, the old comparative advantage in trade simply disappeared when foreign competitors imitated the technological innovations that had given the Dutch a competitive advantage in shipping and industry, and it turned into a disadvantage when the Dutch real-wage level remained stubbornly high after the break in the upward secular trend in price levels after 1670.

From this perspective (and from hindsight by comparison with other "maturing" economies) the growth of the financial sector, absolutely and relative to other sectors of the Dutch economy, may not only be seen neutrally, but even as a good thing. The sector might have been the basis for further growth during the 19th century, maybe even supported a new industrial revolution after the British model. Ironically, however, crises in the financial sector brought about the downfall of first the political structures of the old Republic, and finally the near-demise of the Dutch economy (most of all the financial sector) in the first decade of the 19th century.

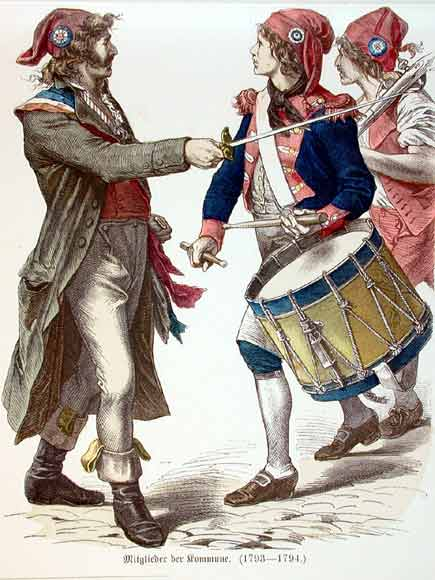
Sansculottes

The Fourth Anglo-Dutch War, which from the English point of view was caused by Dutch greed in supporting the American Revolution with arms and funds (the British pretext for declaring war was a draft-treaty of commerce between the city of Amsterdam and the American revolutionaries) brought about a liquidity crisis for the VOC, which almost brought down the Bank of Amsterdam also, as this bank had been making "anticipatory" loans which the company could not pay back. Both were saved by the government, especially the States of Holland, which provided emergency credit, but financial confidence was severely damaged. Investor confidence was also damaged by the political troubles of the Patriot Revolt after the war. That revolt was sparked by popular demand for thoroughgoing political reforms and reforms in public finance, to cure the ills exposed by the dismal conduct of the war by the regime of Stadtholder William V. When his regime was restored by Prussian force of arms, and the would-be reformers were driven into exile in 1787, many investors lost hope of economic improvement, and they started liquidating their assets in the "real" economy for a flight in foreign bonds and annuities (especially French ones, as the French monarchy happened to have a large borrowing requirement at this time).

When soon afterward the French Revolution of 1789 spread by military means, and put the exiled Patriots in power in a new Batavian Republic, for a while the reform of the state, and the reinvigoration of the economy, seemed to be assured. Unfortunately, the reformers proved to be unable to overcome the conservative, federalist, sentiments of the voters in their new democracy, and it took autocratic measures, first French-inspired, later by direct French rule, to reform the state. Unfortunately, the influence of the French on the economy was less benign. The French "liberators" started with exacting a war indemnity of 100 million guilders (equal to one-third of the estimated Dutch national income at the time of 307 million guilders). They did more damage, however, by first defaulting on the French public debt, and later (when the Netherlands were annexed to the French empire after 1810) on the Dutch public debt. This was the first such default for the Dutch ever. Bonds that had paid a dependable income since 1515 suddenly lost their value. This loss devastated the financial sector as up to half of the national wealth (and the source for future investments) evaporated with the stroke of a pen. Napoleon concluded the process of destruction of the Dutch economy by enforcing the Continental System effectively, snuffing out Dutch contraband trade with the British, while at the same time keeping French markets closed to Dutch exports even when the Netherlands were part of the French empire.

Consequently, Amsterdam lost its position in the international capital market forever to London. The merchant bankers left en masse. Though for a while cities in the maritime Dutch provinces lost urban population, while grass grew in their streets, and their ports were empty, and even though the Netherlands' economy experienced deindustrialization and pauperization, with a concomitant re-agriculturalization, it did not revert to premodern days. It even managed to hang on for another fifty years, resistant to attempts at industrialization in the British mode, even though those attempts did take hold in the former Southern Netherlands, with which it shared a state until 1830. Only in the mid-19th century, after the final liquidation of the repudiated public debt (and the attendant restoration of public credit) did the Dutch economy start a new epoch of modern economic growth.

== Sources ==
- Vries, J. de, and Woude, A. van der (1997), The First Modern Economy. Success, Failure, and Perseverance of the Dutch Economy, 1500–1815, Cambridge University Press, ISBN 978-0-521-57825-7
