= Acceptance credit =

An acceptance credit is a type of letter of credit that is paid by a time draft authorizing payment on or after a specific date, if the terms of the letter of credit have been complied with. The bank "accepts" bills of exchange drawn on the bank by the debtor, discounts them and agrees to pay for them when they mature.

There are two types of acceptance credit, confirmed and unconfirmed. Unconfirmed acceptance credit means that the buyer takes the risk that payment will not be made, due to any number of contingencies such as shipment non-delivery, confiscation by customs authorities, or any other problems. Confirmed acceptance credit means that the bank upon which the credit has been issued, essentially guarantees payment as long as the terms of the letter of credit have been complied with.

Confirmed acceptance credit is more expensive to establish than unconfirmed acceptance credit because the issuing bank is effectively guaranteeing payment. It also transfers the risk of non-delivery to the recipient, because once the seller places the product in the hands of the shipping company, the seller has complied and will be paid; if the shipment does not arrive, is delayed, or other problems occur, the buyer cannot stop payment or otherwise prevent redemption of the acceptance credit.

Banks may also create an acceptance credit facility allowing a company to issue time drafts not linked to specific shipments in order to provide general working capital finance. Under the arrangement the issuing company presents bills of exchange to the bank for acceptance, confirmation and sale at a discount to face value (representing the finance cost until maturity). The discounted sum is made available to the issuing company until the bill's maturity when it is obliged to repay the bill's full face value to the bank. The process may then be repeated to provide a so-called rolling facility. While popular in the pre-electronic era, such facilities have since been widely replaced by financing arrangements which do not require the issue of paper.

== Banking and trade finance usage ==
Acceptance credit is closely associated with banker's acceptances, which are time drafts guaranteed by a bank and commonly used in international trade finance. By accepting the draft, the bank assumes the obligation to pay the holder at maturity, thereby reducing the credit risk for the seller and improving the negotiability of the instrument.

Banker's acceptances may be held until maturity or sold in secondary markets at a discount, providing liquidity to the holder. They are widely used as a short-term financing tool because they combine the creditworthiness of the issuing bank with the flexibility of a negotiable financial instrument.
