= Kalt =

Kalt may refer to:

== Place ==
- Kalt, Khuzestan, village in Khuzestan Province, Iran
- Kalt, Rhineland-Palatinate, municipality in Rhineland-Palatinate, Germany

== People ==
- Brian C. Kalt, American professor of law
- Dieter Kalt (born 1974), Austrian ice hockey player
- Eugène Kalt (1861–1941), French ophthalmologist
- Hans Kalt (1924–2011), Swiss rower
- Joerg Kalt (1967–2007), Austrian film director
- Josef Kalt (1920–2012), Swiss rower

== Other ==
- KALT-FM, radio station in California, United States
