= Barthélemy Hervart =

- Born: 16 August 1607; Augsburg
- Died: 22 October 1676 (aged 69); Paris
- Occupation: Banker
- Years active: 1639–1676
- Known for: banker to generals and kings
- Spouse: Esther Vimar (m. 1629)
- Children: 1 son, 2 daughters
- Father: Daniel Herwart

Barthélemy Hervart or Herwart (16 August 1607 – 22 October 1676) was a Huguenot banker. He saved the French monarchy on several occasions during the Fronde, the series of civil wars in France in the mid-17th century, by means of important loans, and during the period of the fall of Louis XIV's Superintendent of Finance Nicolas Fouquet.

Along with his brother and several other partners, Hervart took part in the financing of the salt marsh drainage project in Arles and Les Baux.

== Early life and family ==
Hervart's father Daniel Herwart was a Protestant banker from Augsburg who moved to Lyon.

Hervart was married to Esther Vimar in 1629 with whom he had three children: Jean-Antoine Hervart, Anne Hervart, who converted to Catholicism, and Esther d'Hervart. Esther (junior) married Charles III de La Tour du Pin, and they had six children of whom four lived to be adults. One of them married an English nobleman. The family moved to England where they acquired (de facto) citizenship.

Other Herwart or Hervart family included Barthélemy's ancestor Georg Herwart who was mayor of Augsburg from 1539 to 1548, Georg's son Ulrich, who moved to Lyon, and Ulrich's son Daniel who married Anne Erlin in 1599 and had four children, including Barthélemy.

== Career ==
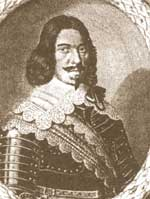
Bernard of Saxe-Weimar.

=== Arms and military ===
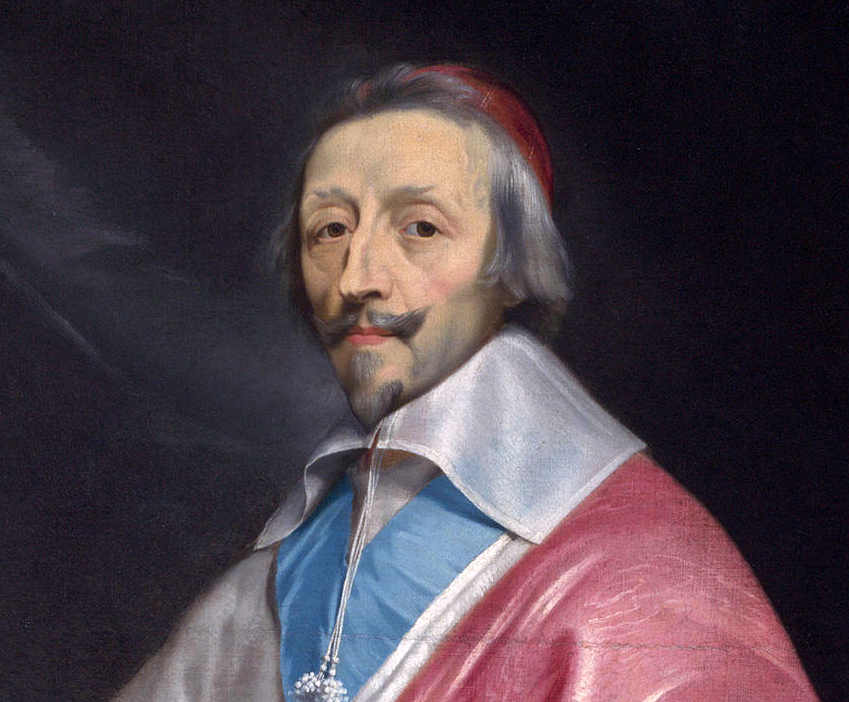
Richelieu, by Champaigne

Initially an arms dealer, Herwart was Army paymaster for Bernard de Saxe-Weimar, a general in the Thirty Years War. When the general died in 1639, Hervart was put in charge of negotiating with Cardinal Richelieu for the reincorporation of Bernard's troops into the service of King Louis XIII. This culminated in the signing of the Treaty of Breisach on 9 October 1639, which in turn allowed Barthélemy and his brother Jean Henry to acquire French nationality and land in Alsace at Huningue, as well as the estate at Landser.

=== Banking ===
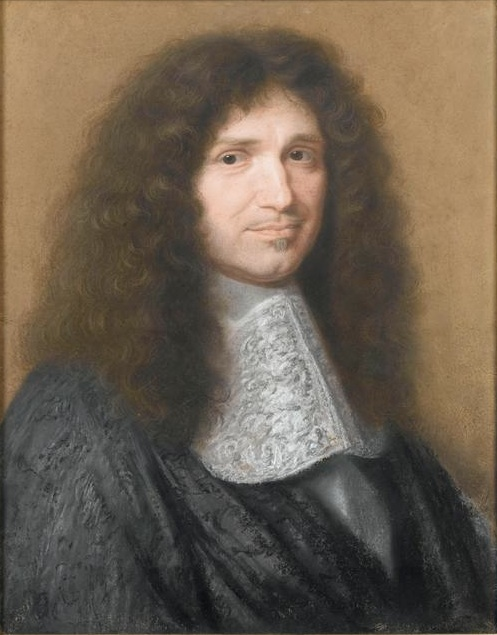
Jean-Baptiste Colbert by Robert Nanteuil (1676)

Following that, the brothers became bankers in Paris. Barthélemy was Councillor of State in 1649. His financial support permitted Cardinal Mazarin to overcome his opponents. Hervart was named Intendant des finances in 1650, and, even though he was Protestant, obtained the post of Controller-General of Finances in 1657. He retained that position until 12 December 1665.

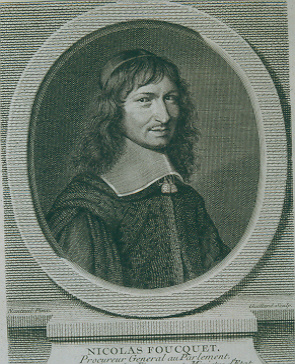
Portrait of Fouquet

After the arrest of Nicolas Fouquet, Louis XIV gave exclusive authority over his finances to Colbert, as he was already "a member of our council and Intendant of Finances" and made Colbert his Controller-General of Finances a position previously carried out collectively by Louis Nicolas le Tonnelier de Breteuil and Barthélemy Hervart. Breteuil and Hervart were duly compensated for the loss of position.

When Fouquet fell out of favor, Hervart was sued like many financiers, and sentenced to pay a token fine. He was also an investor in salt marshes, in a company for the drainage of the marshes of Arles and Baux, and of the French East India Company.

=== Marsh project funding ===
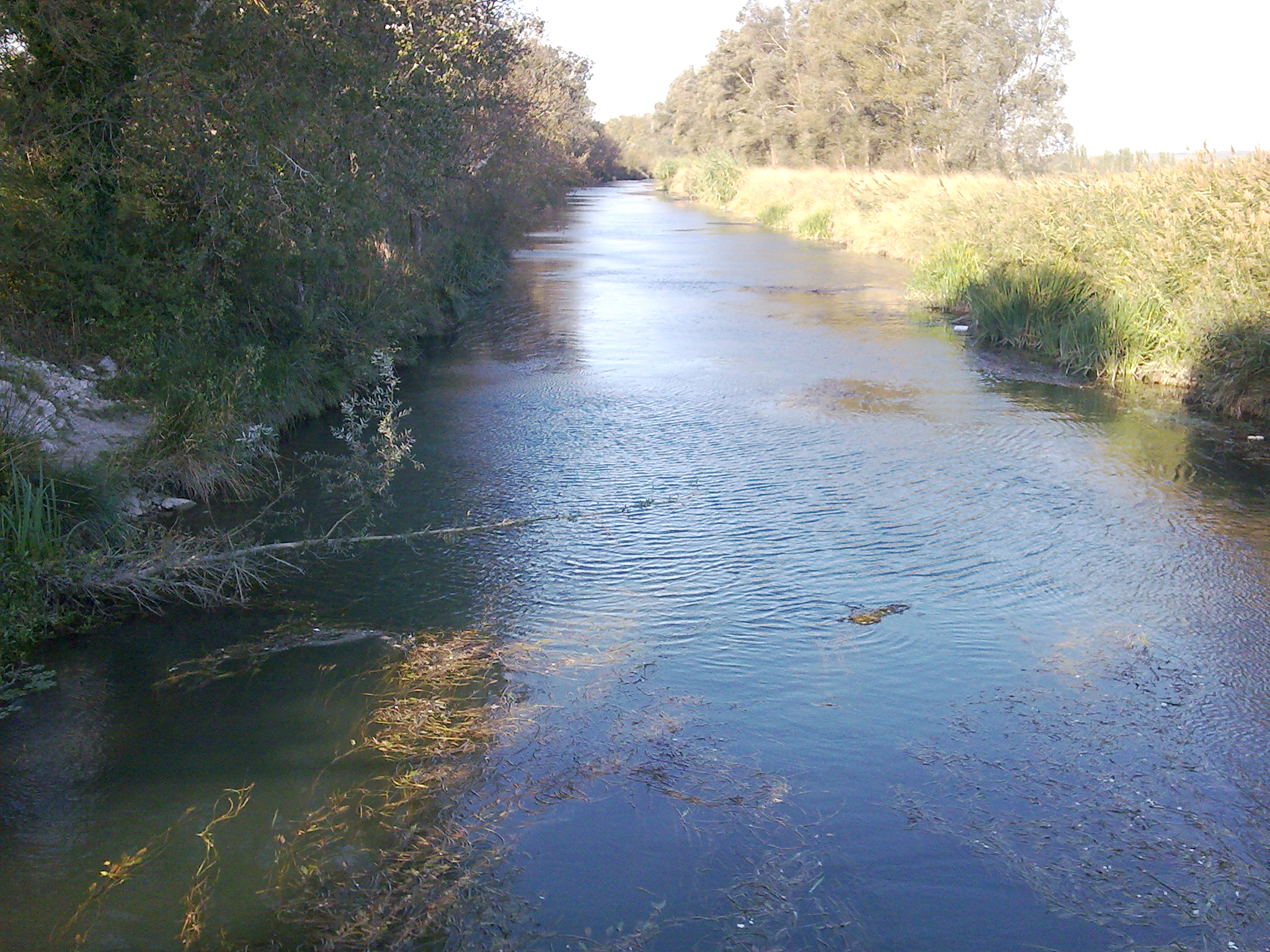
The canal of the Baux Valley, bordering the former Baux Marsh

Arles and Les Baux-de-Provence are located in southwestern Provence just north and east of the marshy Camargue region along the Mediterranean. On 16 August 1642, a contract to drain the marshes was agreed to between the group of Protestant financiers represented by Dutch engineer Jan van Ens: first, the Arles marsh located between Arles and Tarascon, and second, the marsh at Les Baux.

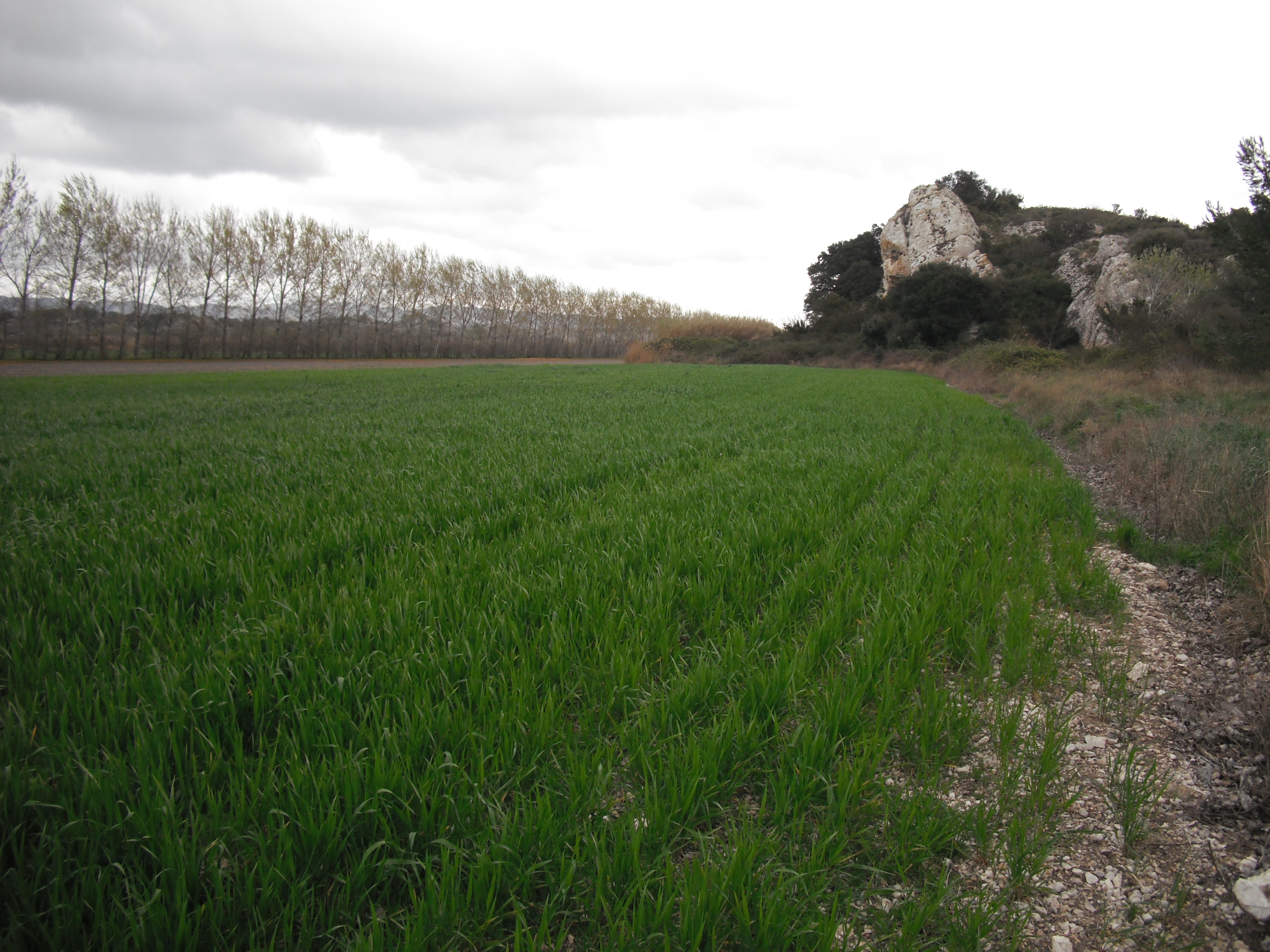
Wheat field in the former Baux Marsh. Northern slope of the Linsolat rocks.

Van Ens was the engineer in charge of the project. In order to finance the labor, the "Company for the Drainage of the Marshes of Arles and Baux" (Société de dessèchement des marais d'Arles et des Baux) was founded. Funds were obtained by financiers close to Cardinal Richelieu and Mazarin, including the Hervart brothers Barthélemy and Jean Henry, and Jean Hoeufft. Other partners included Madame Van Ens (heir of her husband), Octavio de Strada of Dutch origin, Michel Lucas, and Jean François Genoyer.

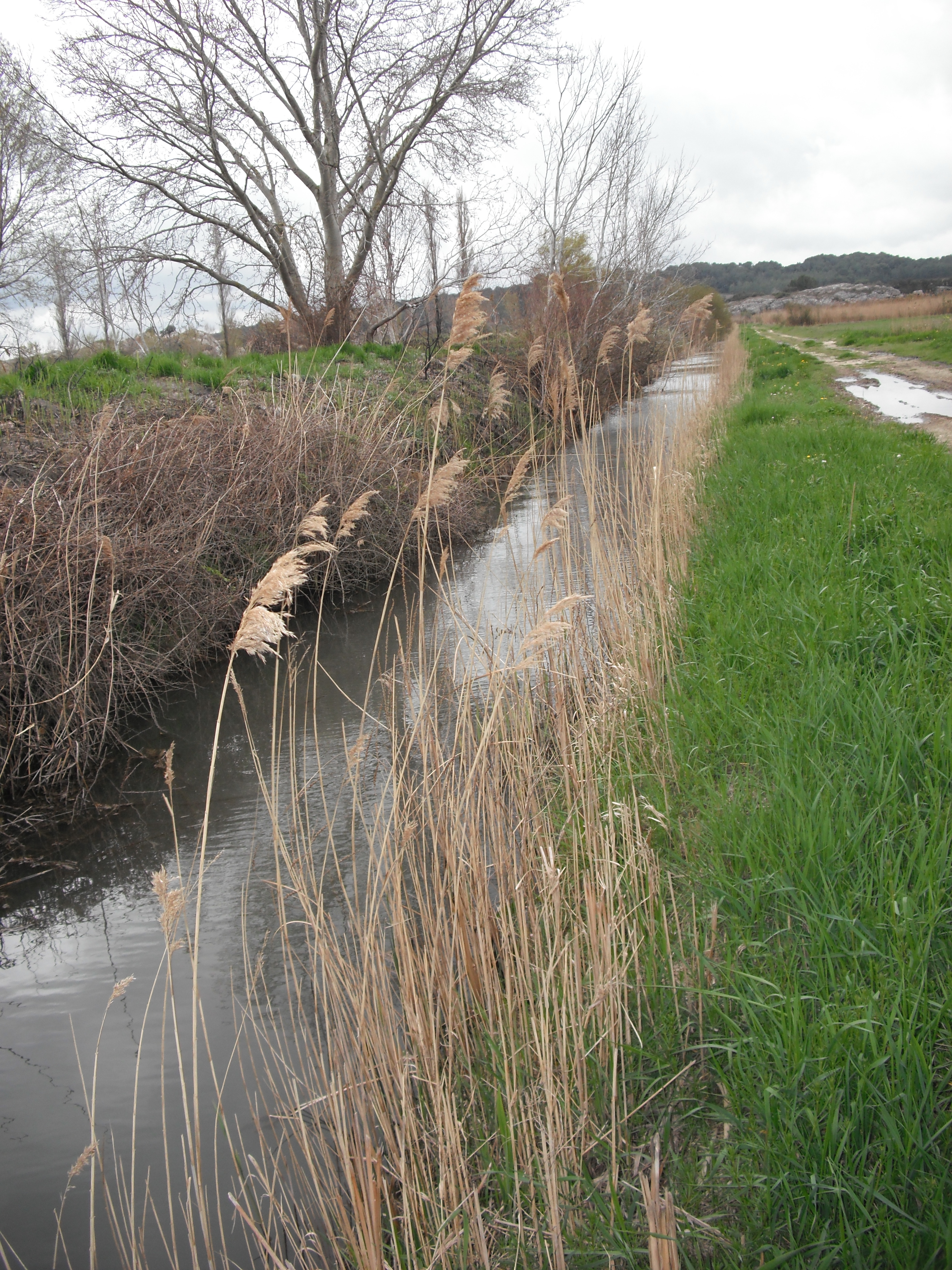
Canal of the Baux Marsh, village of Fontvieille

Jean Henry Hervart took charge of the company at Arles.

On 31 October 1653, articles were drawn up concerning the rules and regulations concerning the drainage operation and covered the management of the work and the responsibility of the associates. It also imposed a requirement to meet yearly on 16 August to "advise and organize the affairs of the company, and to proceed with the nomination of a Director."

Over time, the membership declined. Van Ens died in 1652. Lucas abandoned his shares to the heirs of Jean Hoeufft, who died before Van Ens, and to the Hervarts in 1659. Stada died in 1655. By 1659, the company only included the Hervarts, and the Hoeufft heirs. After the revocation of the Edict of Nantes in 1598, the Hervarts' goods were seized by the King, as they were considered to be religionnaires. (Note: From the 17th c., the Huguenots in France were called religionnaires because the royal edicts spoke not of Protestantism but of the "so-called Reformed Religion" ("religion prétendue réformée"). See the discussion about Jean-Louis Guez de Balzac in Socrate Chrestien (1623) on the best way to call the Protestants.) Their goods were only returned in 1692 and only to Catholic heirs residing in France. Property of Hoeufft's heirs were not affected as he was Dutch, but they were confiscated during the war with Holland, and eventually returned in 1713. Descendants of Hervart and Hoeufft thus remained the owners of the company during the 18th century.

== Death ==
Hervart died extremely rich in Paris in 1676, without having been unduly affected because of his Protestant faith. (Note: Huguenots suffered much persecution in France; see also French Wars of Religion and Protestantism in France.)

== See also ==
- Château de Saint-Cloud
- Thirty Years War
- History of banking

== Sources ==
- Dulong, Claude (1951), Banquier du roi : Barthélemy Hervart (1606-1676) [The King's Banker: Barthélemy Hervart (1606-1676)] (in French), Paris
- Dulong, Claude (2002), Mazarin et l'argent: banquiers et prête-noms [Mazarin and Money: Bankers and Proxies] (in French), Paris: École des Chartes, ISBN 2-900791-50-2
- Bouvier, Jean; Germain-martin, Henry (1964), Finances et financiers Ancien Régime [Finances and Financiers Ancien Régime], Que sais-je, n°1109 (in French), Paris: PUF
- Moreri, Louis (1732), Le grand dictionnaire historique ou Le mélange curieux de l'histoire sacrée et profane [The Large Historical Dictionary or The Curious Mix of Sacred and Profane History] (in French), vol. 4, Paris, pp. 111–112
- Haag, Eugène; Haag, Émile (1855), La France protestante ou vies des protestants français qui se sont faits un nom dans l'histoire [Protestant France, or Lives of French Protestants Who Made a Name in History] (in French), vol. 5, pp. 512–513
- Jean, Michel (2011), Les architectes de l'eau en Provence. De la Renaissance au XXe siècle [The Water Architects in Provence. From the Renaissance to the 20th Century] (in French), Arles: Actes Sud, pp. 134–163, ISBN 978-2-7427-9710-3
- Morera, Raphaël (2011), L'assèchement des marais en France au XVIIe siècle [Draining of Marshes in France in the 17th Century] (in French), Rennes: Presses universitaires de Rennes, pp. 111–143, ISBN 978-2-7535-1466-9
- Dessert, Daniel (1984), Argent, pouvoir et société au Grand Siècle [Money, Power, and Society] (in French), Paris: Fayard, pp. 10, 70, 88, 90, 91, 95, 114, 191, 193, 197, 201, 251, 284, 289, 322, 327, 328, 605, ISBN 2-213-01485-X
