= Ran Laurie =

British rower (1915–1998)

- Born: William George Ranald Mundell Laurie; 4 May 1915; Grantchester, Cambridgeshire, England, United Kingdom
- Died: 19 September 1998 (aged 83); Hethersett, Norfolk, England, United Kingdom
- Education: Monkton Combe School
- Alma mater: Selwyn College, Cambridge
- Occupations: Physician; rower
- Spouses: Patricia Laidlaw (m. 1944; died 1989); Mary Arbuthnot (m. 1990)
- Children: 4, including Hugh

Olympic medal record

Representing Great Britain

Men's rowing
Gold medal – first place	1948 London	Coxless pairs

William George Ranald Mundell "Ran" Laurie (4 May 1915 – 19 September 1998) was a British physician, colonial administrator, Olympic rowing champion and gold medallist. His son is the actor Hugh Laurie.

== Early life, education and rowing career ==
Laurie was born in Grantchester, Cambridgeshire, in 1915, the elder son of William Walker Laurie (1882–1976), a tenant farmer who later worked for the Ely Sugar Beet Company, and Margaret Grieve (née Mundell) (1886–1959), who took in paying guests at their house, and during the Second World War was live-in housekeeper for Bishop George Chase, then master of Selwyn College, Cambridge. He was of Scottish descent.

Laurie began his rowing career at Monkton Combe School, and continued rowing when he attended Selwyn College, Cambridge, in 1933, where he was a member of the Hermes Club. A. P. McEldowney, the chronicler of Selwyn rowing and founder of University of London Boat Club, said of Laurie: "This year (1933) there arrived at Selwyn a Freshman who was not only the most famous oarsman Selwyn ever had, but also one of the most famous Great Britain ever had – WGRM Laurie. And we can truly claim him as a Selwyn oarsman. He had always told me he learnt all his rowing from Taffy Jones [W J Llewellyn-Jones] at Monkton Combe School. And where but Selwyn did Taffy learn his rowing?"

Laurie rowed for Cambridge in the 1934, 1935, and 1936 boat races, all of which were won by Cambridge. He was in the boat with Jack Wilson, who was to become his rowing partner later in their careers. At the 1936 Olympics, he rowed as stroke in Great Britain's eight, the team eventually finishing in fourth place. Together, Laurie and Wilson, rowing for Leander Club, won the Silver Goblets at Henley Royal Regatta in 1938.

After the war interrupted their rowing careers, Laurie and Wilson returned to Henley in 1948, once again winning the Silver Goblets. This was followed a month later by a gold medal in the coxless pair event at the 1948 Olympics in London, rowing on their familiar Henley course. It was described by Laurie as "the best row we ever had". Laurie and Wilson were the best pair of their generation, and it was not until Steve Redgrave and Andy Holmes won the Olympics in 1988 that Britons once more excelled in this class of boat. Laurie and Wilson were known as the "Desert Rats" because of their sojourn in the Sudan. They were trained at Leander Club by Alexander McCulloch, who won a silver medal at the 1908 Olympics. Their boat is now on show at the River and Rowing Museum at Henley-on-Thames, hanging above the boat that won the 1996 Summer Olympics with Redgrave and Pinsent.

Laurie was elected a steward of Henley Royal Regatta in 1951 and also served as a Henley umpire. He sat on Henley's management committee between 1975 and 1986.

== Colonial and medical career ==
Laurie joined the Sudan Political Service in 1936, becoming District Commissioner of Nyala. In 1954, he qualified as a medical doctor, working for 30 years as a general practitioner in Blackbird Leys, Oxford. He also chaired the Oxford Committee of The Duke of Edinburgh's Award between 1959 and 1969, and the Oxford branch of Save the Children from 1986 to 1989. In 2005, it was proposed that the newly refurbished health centre in Blackbird Leys be named after Laurie in recognition of his service to the local community; however, it was subsequently named The Leys, after the local area, when it opened in February 2006.

== Personal life ==
In 1944, Laurie married Patricia Laidlaw; they were married until her death from motor neuron disease in 1989. Both were members of their local Presbyterian church, now St Columba's United Reformed Church, Oxford. They had two daughters and two sons, the youngest of whom is the actor Hugh Laurie, who followed in his father's footsteps, rowing for Selwyn College and Cambridge University. Ran Laurie married Mrs Douglas Ernest Arbuthnot, (Evaline) Mary Arbuthnot, née Morgan in 1990 in Norfolk.

Laurie died of Parkinson's disease in 1998 at the age of 83.

== See also ==
- List of Cambridge University Boat Race crews
