= Spencer Grace (rower) =

Australian rower

Frederick Spencer Grace OAM (16 January 1907 – 29 September 1999) was born in Mosman, New South Wales. He was educated at North Sydney Boys High School. He became managing director of Automatic Totalisators Limited. He was a lifetime member of the North Shore Rowing Club, and went on to compete for Australia at the 1948 Summer Olympics, in the double sculls with Ted Bromley.
