= Rowing at the 1948 Summer Olympics – Men's coxless pair =

Men's coxless pairs at the Games of the XIV Olympiad
- Date: August 5–9, 1948
- Competitors: 24 from 12 nations

Medalists
1st place, gold medalist(s)		Jack Wilson; Ran Laurie	Great Britain
2nd place, silver medalist(s)		Hans Kalt; Josef Kalt	Switzerland
3rd place, bronze medalist(s)		Felice Fanetti; Bruno Boni	Italy

The men's coxless pairs competition at the 1948 Summer Olympics took place at Henley-on-Thames, London.

== Schedule ==
Date	Round
August 5, 1948	Heats
August 6, 1948	Repechage
August 7, 1948	Semifinal
August 9, 1948	Final

== Results ==
=== Heats ===
First boat of each heat qualified to the semifinal, remainder goes to the repechage.

==== Heat 1 ====
Rank	Rowers	Country	Time	Notes
1	Hans Kalt; Josef Kalt	Switzerland	7:20.4	Q
2	Spencer Grace; Ted Bromley	Australia	7:26.8	
3	Jørn Snogdahl; Søren Jensen	Denmark	7:28.3	

==== Heat 2 ====
Rank	Rowers	Country	Time	Notes
1	Jack Wilson; Ran Laurie	Great Britain	7:20.3	Q
2	Felice Fanetti; Bruno Boni	Italy	7:22.2	
3	Oscar Moreno; Carlos Sambuceti	Argentina	7:54.2	

==== Heat 3 ====
Rank	Rowers	Country	Time	Notes
1	Gert Watzke; Kurt Watzke	Austria	7:19.3	Q
2	John Wade; Ralph Stephan	United States	7:20.3	
3	Evert Gunnarsson; Bernt Torberntsson	Sweden	7:36.3	

==== Heat 4 ====
Rank	Rowers	Country	Time	Notes
1	Pércio Zancani; Paulo Diebold	Brazil	7:33.1	Q
2	Charles Van Antwerpen; Jos Rosa	Belgium	7:35.0	
3	Paul Rothley; Paul Heitz	France	7:36.2	

=== Repechage ===
First boat of each heat qualified to the semifinal.

==== Heat 1 ====
Rank	Rowers	Country	Time	Notes
1	Felice Fanetti; Bruno Boni	Italy	7:24.6	Q
2	John Wade; Ralph Stephan	United States	7:30.5	
3	Paul Rothley; Paul Heitz	France	7:42.3	

==== Heat 2 ====
Rank	Rowers	Country	Time	Notes
1	Jørn Snogdahl; Søren Jensen	Denmark	7:26.4	Q
2	Charles Van Antwerpen; Jos Rosa	Belgium	7:34.4	
3	Oscar Moreno; Carlos Sambuceti	Argentina	7:45.7	

==== Heat 3 ====
Rank	Rowers	Country	Time	Notes
1	Spencer Grace; Ted Bromley	Australia	7:28.4	Q
2	Evert Gunnarsson; Bernt Torberntsson	Sweden	7:34.9	

=== Semifinal ===
First boat of each heat qualified to the final.

==== Heat 1 ====
Rank	Rowers	Country	Time	Notes
1	Hans Kalt; Josef Kalt	Switzerland	7:47.3	Q
2	Spencer Grace; Ted Bromley	Australia	7:54.5	
3	Gert Watzke; Kurt Watzke	Austria	8:03.1	

==== Heat 2 ====
Rank	Rowers	Country	Time	Notes
1	Felice Fanetti; Bruno Boni	Italy	7:52.8	Q
2	Jørn Snogdahl; Søren Jensen	Denmark	7:54.3	

==== Heat 3 ====
Rank	Rowers	Country	Time	Notes
1	Jack Wilson; Ran Laurie	Great Britain	8:05.9	Q
2	Pércio Zancani; Paulo Diebold	Brazil	8:18.6	

=== Final ===
Rank	Rowers	Country	Time	Notes
1st place, gold medalist(s)	Jack Wilson; Ran Laurie	Great Britain	7:21.1	
2nd place, silver medalist(s)	Hans Kalt; Josef Kalt	Switzerland	7:23.9	
3rd place, bronze medalist(s)	Felice Fanetti; Bruno Boni	Italy	7:31.5	
