= Zancani =

Zancani is an Italian surname derived from the medieval given name Giancane. It may refer to the following people:

- Paola Zancani Montuoro (1901–1987), Italian classical scholar, archaeologist, educator and writer
- Pércio Zancani (born 1927), Brazilian rower

== See also ==
- Žančani Mass Grave, Raduše, Slovenia
- Zancan
