= Jack Wilson (rower) =

British rower

Personal information
- Born: John Hyrne Tucker Wilson; 17 September 1914 Bristol, Rhode Island, United States
- Died: 16 February 1997 (aged 82) Devon, Great Britain

Sport
- Sport: Rowing
Medal record
Men's rowing
Representing Great Britain
Men's rowing
Gold medal – first place	1948 London	Coxless pair

John Hyrne Tucker Wilson (17 September 1914 – 16 February 1997) was a British rowing champion and Olympic gold medallist.

Wilson was born in Bristol, Rhode Island to British parents, and was educated in Texas then sent to England to be educated at Shrewsbury School and Pembroke College, Cambridge. While at Cambridge, he rowed in three successive Boat Races (1934–36) in which Cambridge defeated Oxford. During the 1935 and 1936 races, he rowed alongside Ran Laurie, who became his rowing partner after Cambridge and a lifelong friend.

After graduating from University, Wilson took a post as a District Commissioner with the Sudan Political Service, missing an opportunity to participate alongside Laurie in Britain’s Eights boat at the 1936 Olympics. With Laurie joining the Sudan Political Service the following year, the two men joined forces in rowing and, while on leave from colonial service in 1938, won the Silver Goblets at Henley Royal Regatta.

Both Wilson and Laurie returned to Sudan following their success, and continued to serve in the Sudan Political Service through the Second World War. In 1942, Wilson survived an attack by a local woman in Sudan who threw an assegai spear at him.

In 1948 Wilson and Laurie returned to Henley and once again won the Silver Goblets, having had little training and no opportunity to row since their success in the event ten years earlier. This was followed later that year by an Olympic gold medal, once again rowing at Henley.

Wilson retired from colonial service in 1954 and worked for the British Steel Corporation. He died in 1997, aged 82.

== See also ==
- List of Cambridge University Boat Race crews
