= Søren Jensen (rower) =

Danish rower (1919–1995)

Personal information
- Born: Ole Søren Jensen; 19 October 1919 Copenhagen, Denmark
- Died: 14 February 1995 (aged 75)

Sport
- Sport: Rowing
Medal record
Men's rowing
Representing Denmark
European Rowing Championships
Gold medal – first place	1947 Lucerne	Coxless pair

Ole Søren Jensen (19 October 1919 – 14 February 1995) was a Danish rower. He competed at the 1948 Summer Olympics in London with Jørn Snogdahl in the men's coxless pair where they were eliminated in the semi-finals.
