= Doug Bowden (rowing) =

Australian rowing coxswain

Douglas Bowden
Personal information
- Born: 24 Nov 1906 Glebe, Sydney
- Died: 20 April 1996 (aged 89) Lindfield, Sydney
- Occupation: Hotel Management

Sport
- Sport: Rowing
- Club: Glebe Rowing Club; North Shore Rowing Club
Medal record
Representing Australia
British Empire Games
| Silver medal – second place | 1938 Sydney | M8+ |

Douglas William Bowden (24 November 1906 – 20 April 1996) was an Australian rowing coxswain. He was twice a national champion and an Australian representative who won a silver medal at the 1938 Commonwealth Games.

== Early life and rowing career ==
Born in Glebe in Sydney, Bowden's father died when he was seven and he left school aged 14 to take employment with the brewery Tooth and Co. His early club coxing was from the Glebe Rowing Club where he was later in life honoured with a life membership. He next joined the North Shore Rowing Club in Sydney where he was both a coxswain and coach and had competitive and representative success. He coached the club's eight to victory in the 1937 Henley-on-Yarra in Melbourne.

Bowden first made state selection in the 1935 New South Wales men's eight which contested and won the King's Cup at the 1935 Interstate Regatta. He was the manager and the coxswain of that crew. In 1936 he again steered the New South Wales eight to another King's Cup victory. He was in the stern of the 1937 New South Wales eight which placed second at Murray Bridge in South Australia to the South Australian eight in that year's King's Cup.

In 1938 he was the coach of the New South Wales eight when they placed second to West Australia in the King's Cup. Then along with four of that crew he was selected in the Australian men's eight for the 1938 Commonwealth Games. That eight with Bowden as coxswain took the silver medal behind the British crew.

After some years' absence from competition due to WWII, Bowden contested the New South Wales 1947 state title for eights in a North Shore Rowing Club crew of which he was cox and coach.

== Rowing administrator and coach ==
In 1939 Bowden was the manager of the New South Wales men's eight for the Interstate Regatta. After the war he was again the manager of the New South Wales men's eight for the Interstate Regatta in 1950. He was on the Regatta Committee for the 1952 Interstate Regatta held on the Nepean River.

From 1969 till 1977 Bowden was a rowing coach of the senior crews at St Joseph's College, Hunters Hill's boatshed where his son had been educated in the 1950s. Doug Bowden was a co-coach of the school's first and second VIIIs and established an impressive record. At the AAGPS Head of the River the school's first VIII placed second in 1970 and 1972 and won in 1971 and 1973. In 1973 the school's 2nd VIII was also victorious. He was esteemed as an honorary Old Boy of the College.

== War service, professional and personal life ==
Bowden enlisted in the 2nd AIF in April 1942. He saw action in the Papua New Guinea on the Kokoda Trail. On his discharge at war's end in September 1945 he was a private posted to the Queensland Line of Communication Area.

Pre and post WWII Bowden had a 50 year career with Tooth and Co. By the 1950s his role was as a management supervisor of the many hotels owned by the brewery throughout NSW and the ACT.

Bowden's longstanding marriage was to Isabel who pre-deceased him. They had two children, Lois and Peter and lived in Pymble, Sydney. Doug Bowden died aged 90 in 1996 following a series of strokes.
