= Bruno Boni =

Italian rower (1915–2003)

Medal record

Men's rowing

Representing Italy

Olympic Games
Bronze medal – third place	1948 London	Coxless pair

European Rowing Championships
Bronze medal – third place	1949 Amsterdam	Coxless pair

Bruno Boni (13 May 1915 – 30 March 2003) was an Italian rower who competed in the 1948 Summer Olympics.

He was born in Cremona. In 1948, he won the bronze medal with his partner Felice Fanetti in the coxless pairs event.
