= Jos Rosa =

Belgian rower (1926–2020)

Jo Rosa
Personal information
- Born: Joseph Norbert Denis Rosa; 24 May 1926 Menen, Belgium
- Died: 20 November 2020 (aged 94) Merksem, Belgium

Sport
- Sport: Rowing
Medal record
Men's rowing
Representing Belgium
European Rowing Championships
Silver medal – second place	1949 Amsterdam	Coxless pair
Bronze medal – third place	1950 Milan	Coxless pair
Gold medal – first place	1951 Mâcon	Coxless four

Joseph Norbert Denis Rosa (24 May 1926 – 20 November 2020) was a Belgian rower. He competed at the 1948 Summer Olympics in London with the men's coxless pair where they were eliminated in the round one repêchage, and also in the coxless four at the 1952 Summer Olympics in Helsinki.
