= Kurt Watzke =

Austrian rower

Personal information
- Born: 3 October 1920
- Died: 16 October 2012 (aged 92)
- Relatives: Gert Watzke (brother)

Sport
- Sport: Rowing
Medal record
Men's rowing
Representing Austria
European Rowing Championships
Silver medal – second place	1947 Lucerne	Coxless pair

Kurt Watzke (3 October 1920 – 16 October 2012) was an Austrian rower. He competed at the 1948 Summer Olympics in London with his brother Gert in the men's coxless pair where they were eliminated in the semi-finals.
