= Oscar Moreno (rower) =

Argentine rower (born c. 1912)

Personal information
- Nationality: Argentine
- Born: c. 1912

Sport
- Sport: Rowing

Oscar Moreno (born c. 1912) was an Argentine rower. He competed in the men's coxless pair event at the 1948 Summer Olympics.
