= John Wade (rower) =

American rower (1928–2023)

Personal information
- Full name: Festus John Wade
- Born: August 13, 1928 St. Louis, Missouri, U.S.
- Died: December 13, 2023 (aged 95) Memphis, Tennessee, U.S.

Sport
- Sport: Rowing

John Wade (August 13, 1928 – December 13, 2023) was an American rower. He and Ralph Stephan competed in the men's coxless pair event at the 1948 Summer Olympics.

Wade died in Memphis, Tennessee on December 13, 2023, at the age of 95.
