= Gert Watzke =

Austrian rower (1922–2021)

Personal information
- Born: Gerhard Watzke; 24 September 1922 Klagenfurt, Austria
- Died: 12 June 2021 (aged 98) Ebenthal, Austria
- Relatives: Kurt Watzke (brother)

Sport
- Sport: Rowing
Medal record
Men's rowing
Representing Austria
European Rowing Championships
| Silver medal – second place | 1947 Lucerne | Coxless pair |

Gerhard Watzke (24 September 1922 – 12 June 2021) was an Austrian rower. He competed at the 1948 Summer Olympics in London with his brother Kurt in the men's coxless pair where they were eliminated in the semi-finals.
