= Paul Rothley =

French rower

Personal information
- Nationality: French
- Born: 24 February 1926; Strasbourg, France
- Died: 14 May 2003 (aged 77); Strasbourg, France

Sport
- Sport: Rowing

Paul Rothley (24 February 1926 – 14 May 2003) was a French rower. He competed in the men's coxless pair event at the 1948 Summer Olympics.
