= Eugène Kalt =

French ophthalmologist

Eugène Jean Baptiste Kalt (24 February 1861, in Landser, Haut-Rhin – 9 May 1941) was a French ophthalmologist who developed the first known application of a contact lens for the correction of keratoconus. In 1888, he worked on a crude flat-fitting glass scleral lenses designed to "compress the steep conical apex thereby correcting the condition". His first lenses were crafted from the bottoms of glass test tubes.

Kalt was born in Landser in the Alsace region of France.

== See also ==
- Orthokeratology
