= Esther d'Hervart =

French noblewoman, Protestant and refugee to England

- Born: 1636
- Died: 1722 (aged 85–86)

Esther d'Hervart became Esther de la Tour du Pin; Madame de Gouvernet aka marquise de Gouvernet (1636–1722). She was a French noblewoman, Protestant and refugee to England. She and her mother were among seven Protestants allowed to emigrate by Louis XIV with her money and goods.

== Life ==
d'Hervart was one of the three children of Barthélemy Hervart and Esther Vimart who both came from Lyons where they had married in 1629. Her parents moved to Frankfurt am Main where her father and her uncle served Duke Bernard of Saxe-Weimar until he died in 1639. They were given lands and French citizenship when they assisted in the annexation of Alsace.

In 1655 she was married at the Charenton Temple outside Paris to Charles de la Tour du Pin, marquis de Gouvernet. He came from an ancient and rich family. Sometime after 1680 her husband died and it was a time of increasing ill feeling towards the Huguenots. She was still in the Charenton Temple congregation and there was frequent discussion of emigration to England. She was involved in arranging the marriage of her fourteen-year-old daughter to Henry Savile, Lord Eland (1660–1688). The introduction was made by Henry Savile and she was prepared to offer a dowry of £25,000. However the Savile family found the political situation too difficult and although the dowry was attractive they broke off the proposed engagement.

However Henry Savile, Lord Eland remembered her daughter and after four years he wanted to rekindle the proposed marriage. During those years he had not been well-behaved and his relationship with his father was poor, but we has contrite and between March and June 1684 the permission of Louis XIV was received. The marriage in June was followed by a plan to move the couple, herself and her entourage to England, but Louis XIV objected. There was substantial negotiation with the French court. The King eventually decided that he would allow seven French Protestants to leave the country and she and her mother made the cut. However her children were not included and three of them were left in France.

Lord Eland died in October 1687 leaving his estate to his wife. The will was contested but with no result. His wife, her daughter, died in 1694 and the money was left to her. By this time d'Hervart become a denizen which was a de facto English citizenship. She accentuated that England was the family home when she paid for her mother and for her daughter to be buried in a vault in Westminster Abbey. (This was where in time she would be buried.)

d'Hervart enjoyed London society and she had houses in St James Square and what was then countryside in Paddington. She died in 1722. The monument to her, her daughter and her mother, which was carved in marble by Henri Nadauld is in the Westminster Abbey triforium.
