= Marais Poitevin =

Marshland in western France

Coordinates: 46°20′N 0°40′W

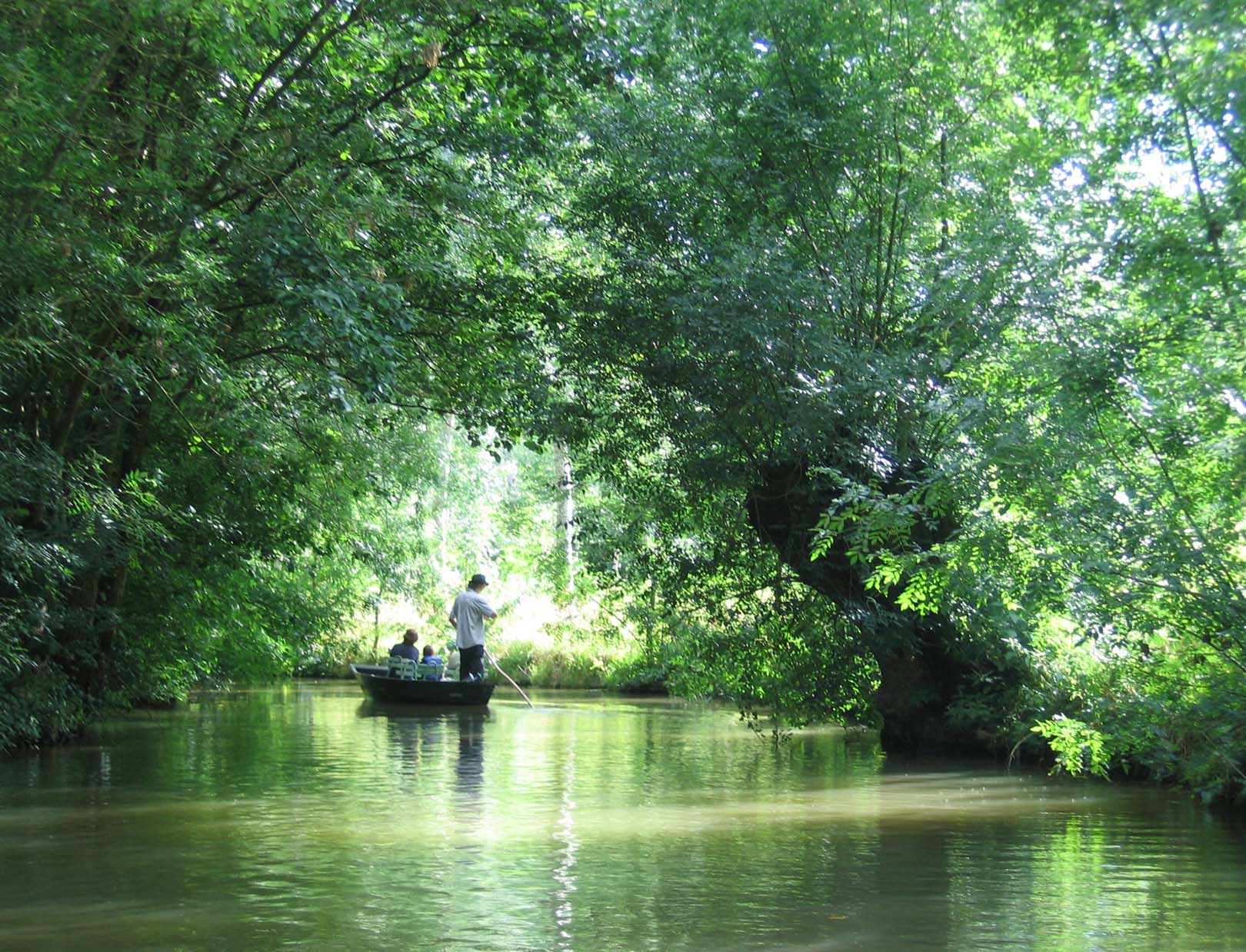
"The Green Venice": an inner canal seen from a flatboat.

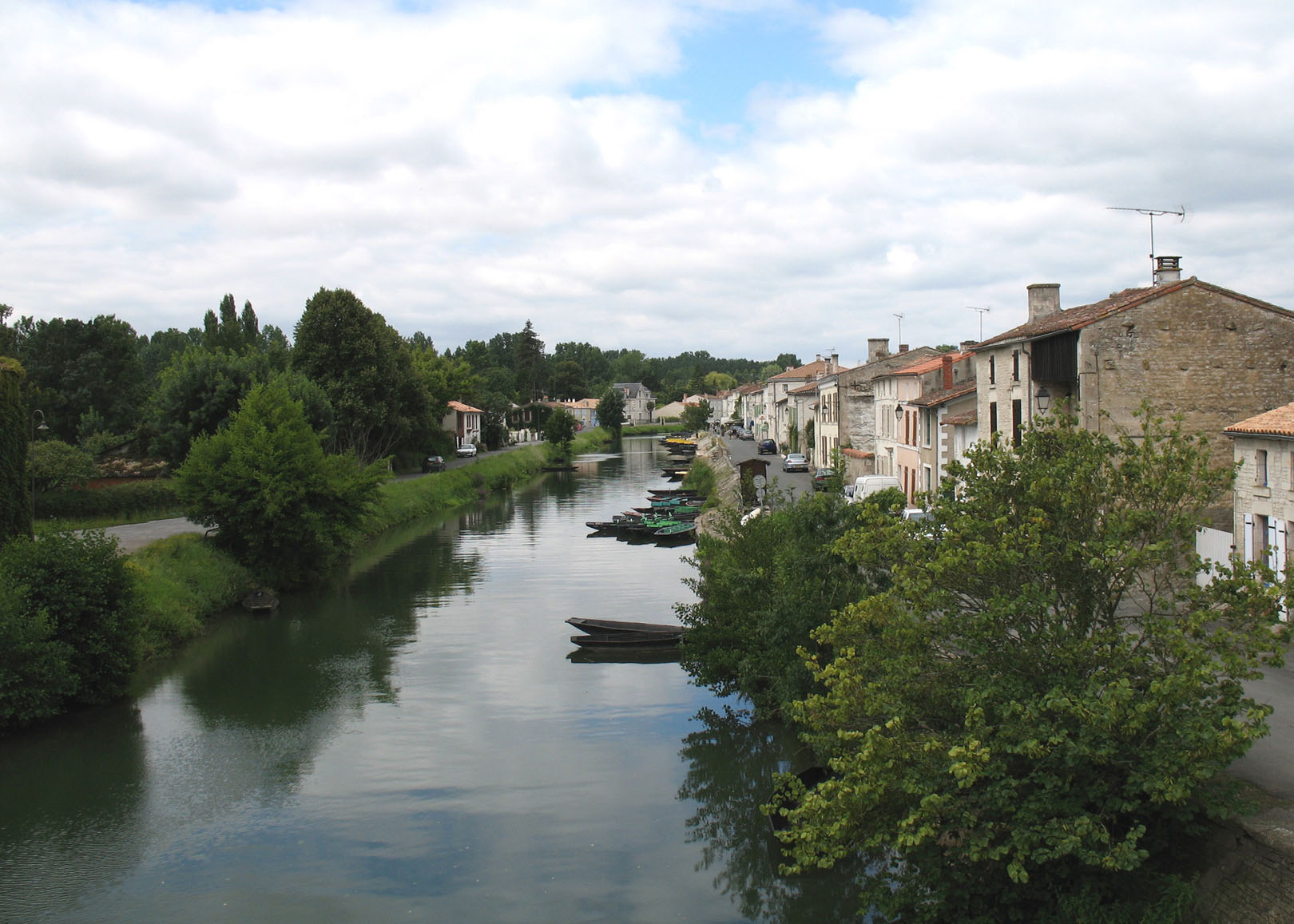
Quay at the small town of Coulon.

The Marais Poitevin (pronounced [maʁɛ pwatvɛ̃]) or Poitevin Marsh is a large area of marshland in the former province of Poitou in western France.

It is a remnant of what was the former Gulf of Poitou. The western zone near the sea (about two-thirds of the area) is called the "dry marsh" (or "dried marsh"). It is used for farming and livestock breeding. The eastern zone, called the "wet marsh", is a maze of islets crisscrossed by picturesque canals, primarily now a tourist destination for boating. It is nicknamed The Green Venice (la Venise Verte).

== Overview ==
With an area of 970 square kilometres (370 sq mi), this is the largest marsh on France's Atlantic coast and the second largest of the country, after the Camargue in Provence. The Marais Poitevin is the most important area of angelica cultivation in France. Extending across three departments (Vendée, Deux-Sèvres, and Charente-Maritime), it is situated west of Niort, north of La Rochelle, and south of Fontenay-le-Comte.

In 1979 the Marais Poitevin was declared a Regional Natural Park (French: Parc naturel régional), in an effort to help preserve it. The marsh lost that status in 1997, due to intensive agricultural development around the Marsh that endangered the unique character of the region. Only a core Interregional Park (Parc Interrégional du Marais poitevin) of 185 square kilometres (71 sq mi) remains. Attempts to regain the full Park classification started in 2002, and supporters proposed a new charter in 2006. While this was accepted by the local authorities, it was rejected in late 2008 by the national government due to a perceived "juridical fragility".

Tourism includes boating in traditional barques, which is a form of punting. There are several piers (French: embarcadères), from which boats can be hired. The myriad canals have become covered in green duckweed (hence the Green Venice nickname). The drained marshland is home to a varied fauna.

== Geology ==
The marsh developed above a limestone plateau, dating from the Jurassic period. This plateau covered much of the former province of Poitou. The Würm glaciation, c. 24,000–10,000 YBP, caused significant marine regression and the recovery of much river erosion (a watershed of c. 535,000 ha), thus exposing the marl-limestone formations. The villages of Maillezais, Saint-Michel-en-l'Herm, and Marans developed on such hillocks.

== Gallery ==
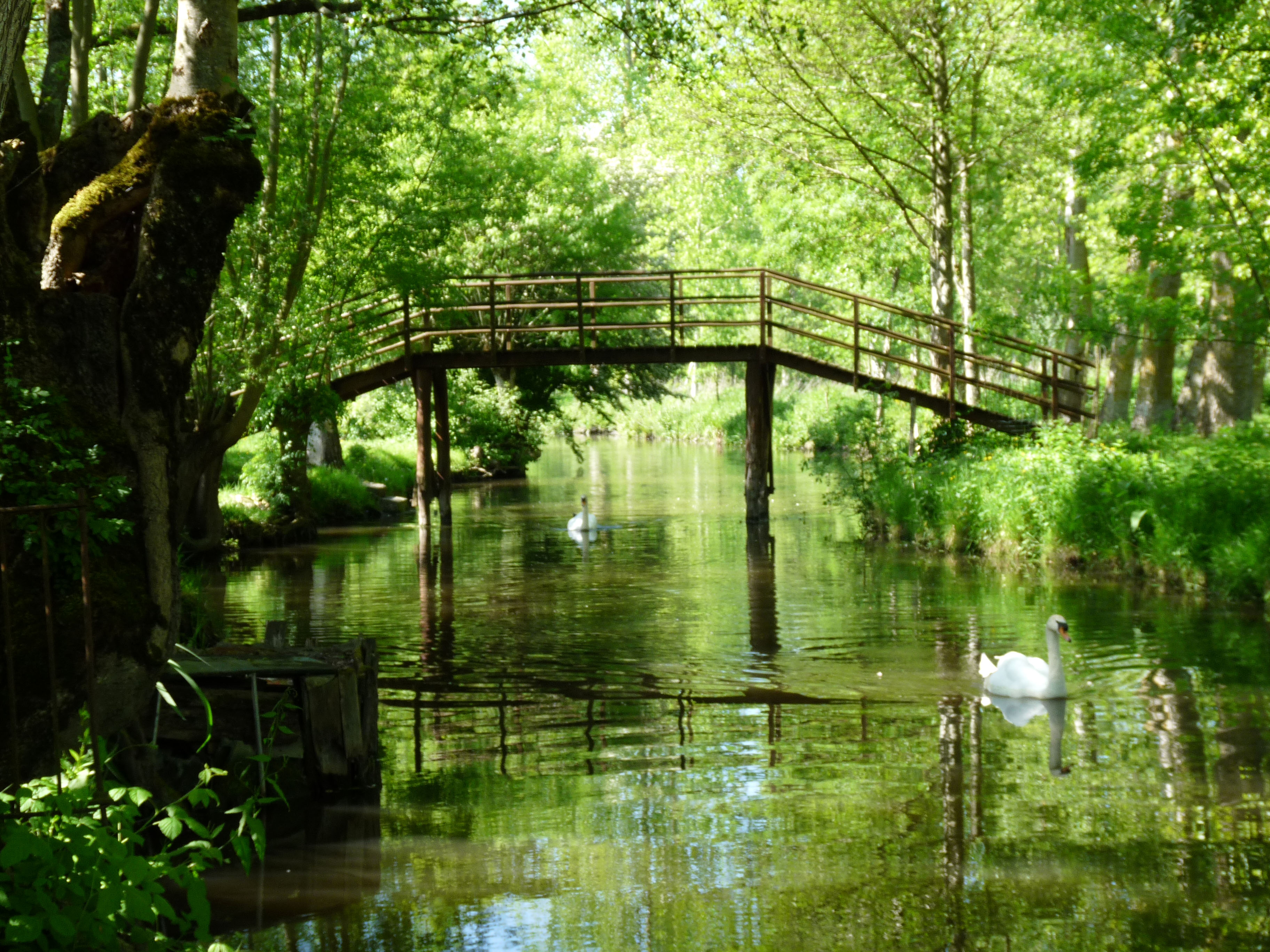
A footbridge over a canal.

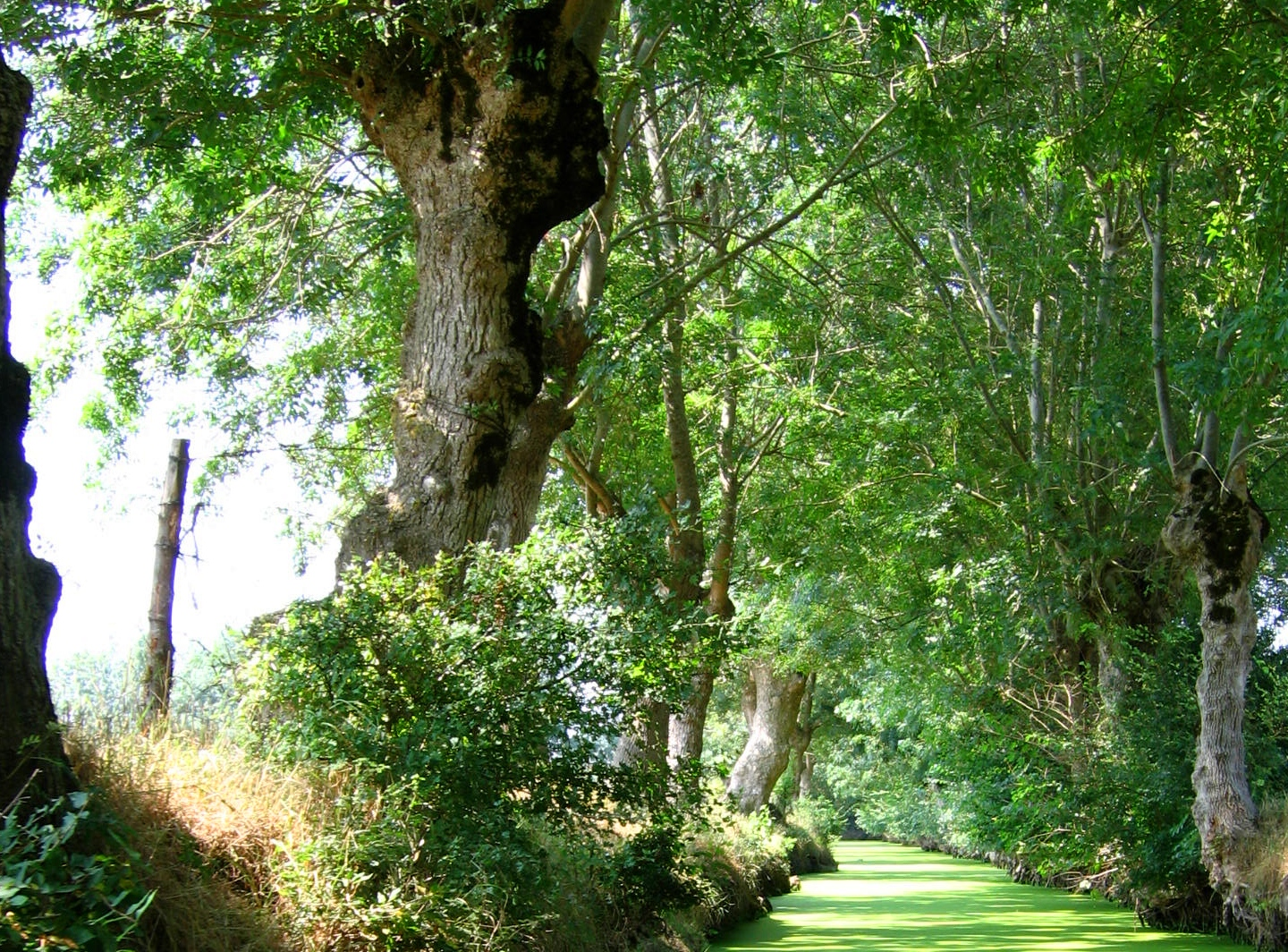
Canal green with duckweed.

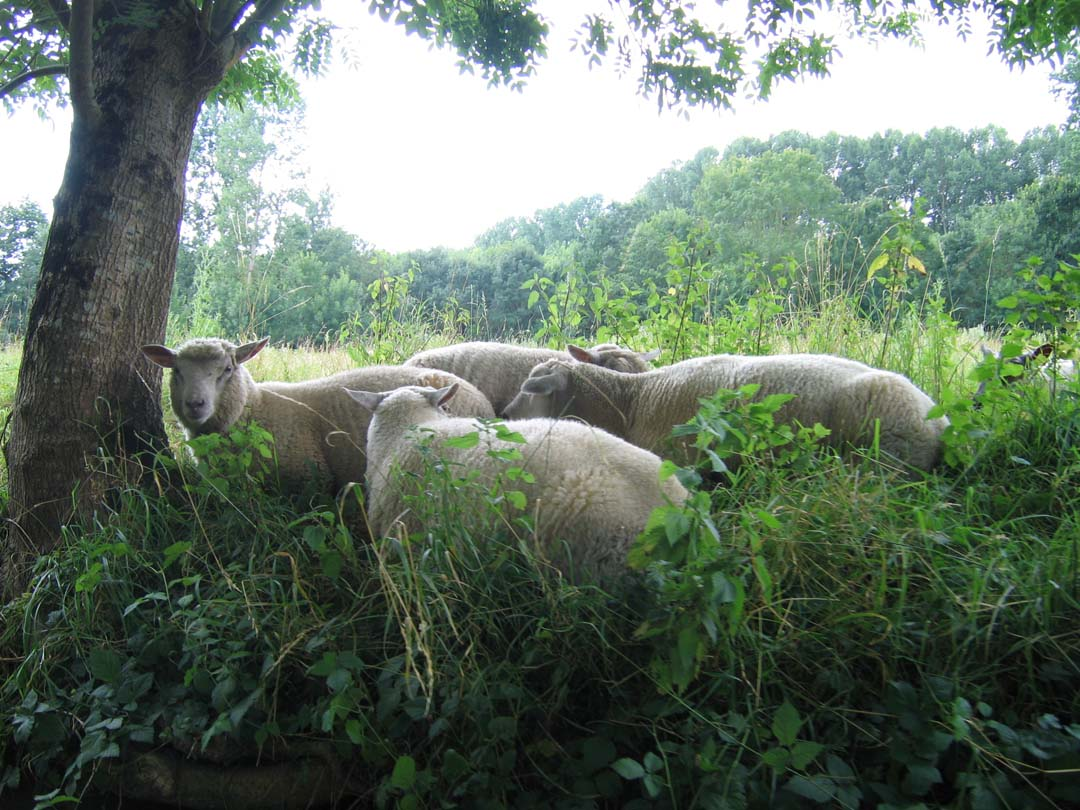
Sheep on an islet.

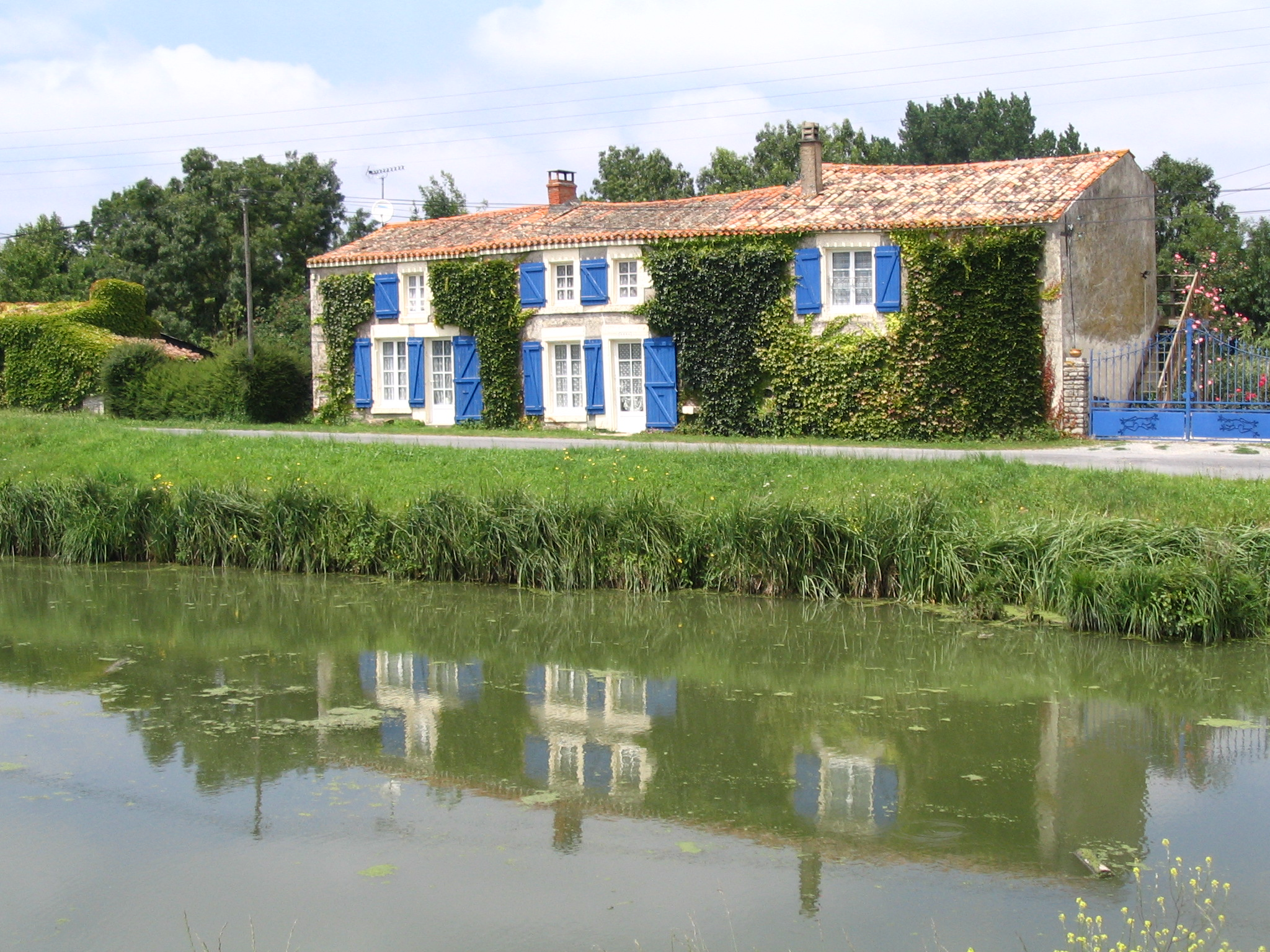
Traditional house by a canal.

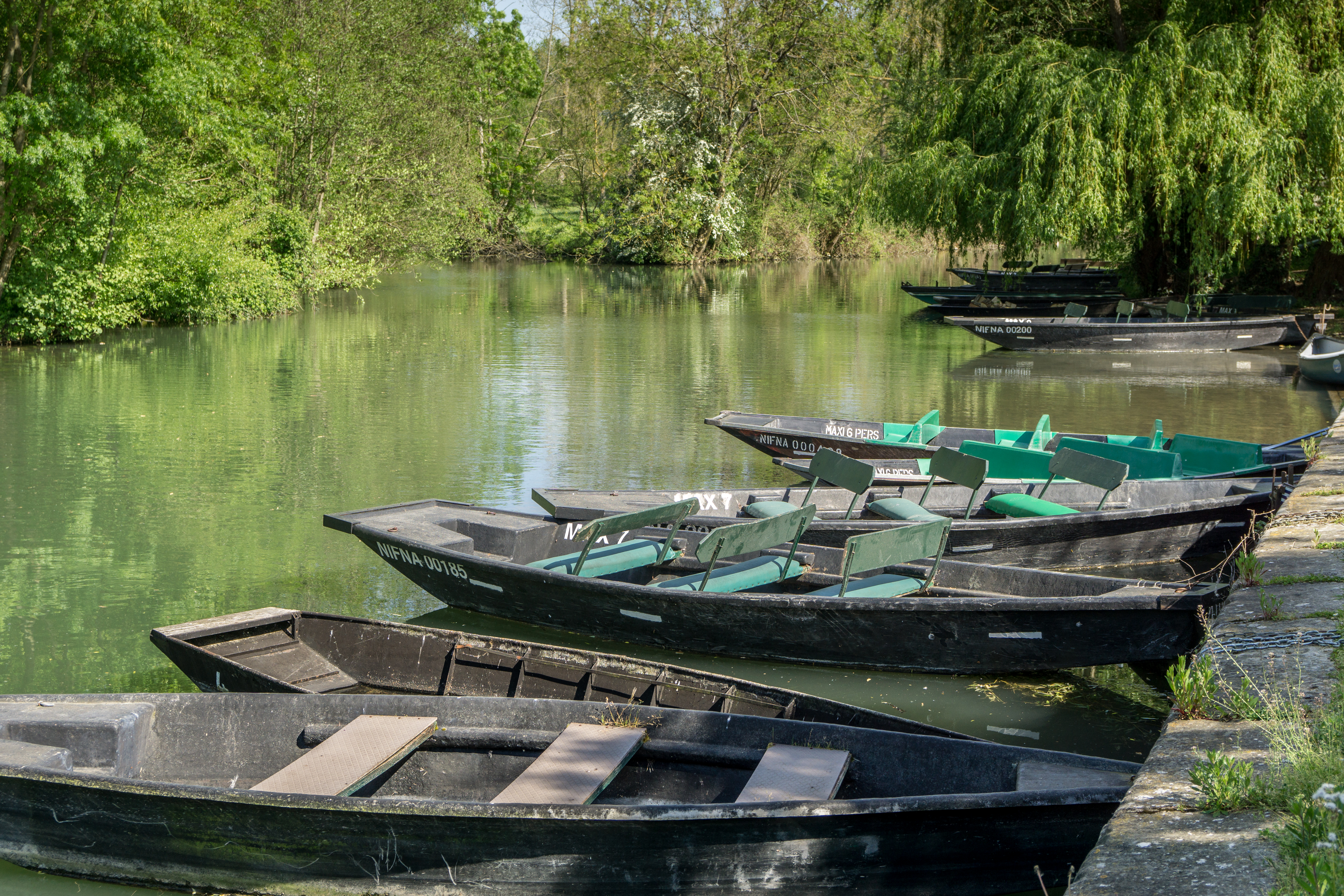
Typical boats (barques) of Marais-poitevin.

== See also ==
- Jean Hoeufft
