= Felice Fanetti =

Italian rower

Medal record

Men's rowing

Representing Italy

Olympic Games
Bronze medal – third place	1948 London	Coxless pair

European Rowing Championships
Bronze medal – third place	1949 Amsterdam	Coxless pair

Felice Fanetti (20 February 1914 – 25 April 1974) was an Italian rower who competed in the 1948 Summer Olympics. He was born in Cremona.

In 1948 he won the bronze medal with his partner Bruno Boni in the coxless pair event.
