= Carlos Sambuceti =

Argentine rower

Personal information
- Nationality: Argentine
- Born: 6 August 1922
- Died: 23 May 2003 (aged 80)

Sport
- Sport: Rowing

Carlos Sambuceti (6 August 1922 – 23 May 2003) was an Argentine rower. He competed in the men's coxless pair event at the 1948 Summer Olympics.
