= Jørn Snogdahl =

Danish rower (1922–2012)

Personal information
- Born: Jørn Peter Snogdahl; 1 October 1922 Copenhagen, Denmark
- Died: 1 July 2012 (aged 89)
- Relatives: Mogens Snogdahl (brother)

Sport
- Sport: Rowing
Medal record
Men's rowing
Representing Denmark
European Rowing Championships
Gold medal – first place	1947 Lucerne	Coxless pair
Silver medal – second place	1951 Mâcon	Eight

Jørn Peter Snogdahl (1 October 1922 – 1 July 2012) was a Danish rower.

Snogdahl was born in 1922 in Copenhagen. He was the elder brother to Mogens Snogdahl.

He competed at the 1948 Summer Olympics in London with Søren Jensen in the men's coxless pair where they were eliminated in the semi-finals.
