= Paulo Diebold =

Brazilian rower (1925–1983)

Personal information
- Nationality: Brazilian
- Born: 6 April 1925
- Died: 10 August 1983 (aged 58)

Sport
- Sport: Rowing

Paulo Diebold (6 April 1925 – 10 August 1983) was a Brazilian rower. He competed in the men's coxless pair event at the 1948 Summer Olympics.
