= Jean Hoeufft =

Dutch-French banker and arms dealer (1578–1651)

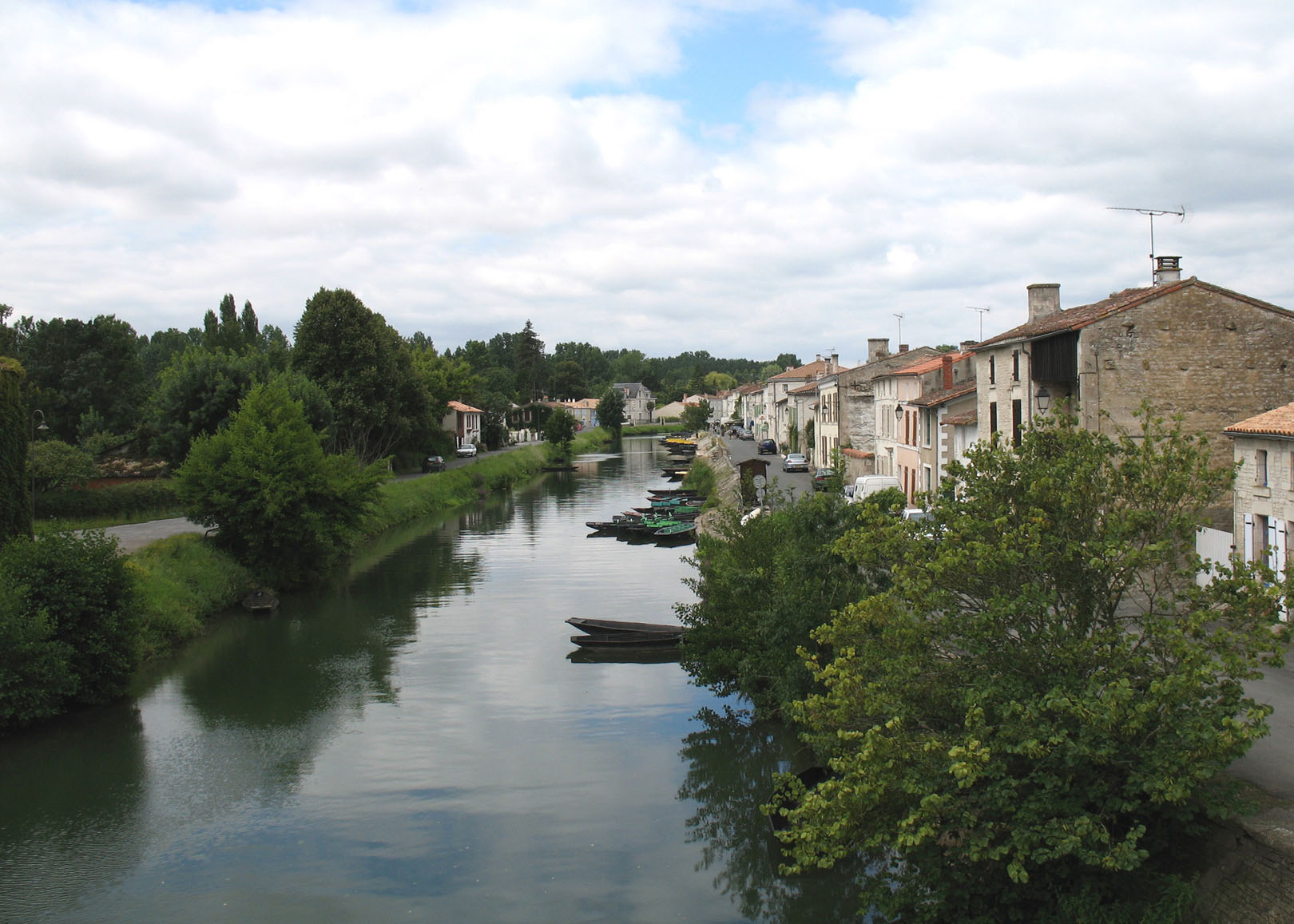
A canal in the Marais Poitevin

Jean Hoeufft (Liège, 1578–Paris, 5 September 1651) was a Dutch banker and arms dealer, who rose through the court of Louis XIII of France to become Treasurer to Louis XIV.

Hoeufft made a fortune from his diplomatic and business ventures, ultimately becoming one of the richest men in Europe outside of the royal families.

== Biography ==
=== Early life and career ===
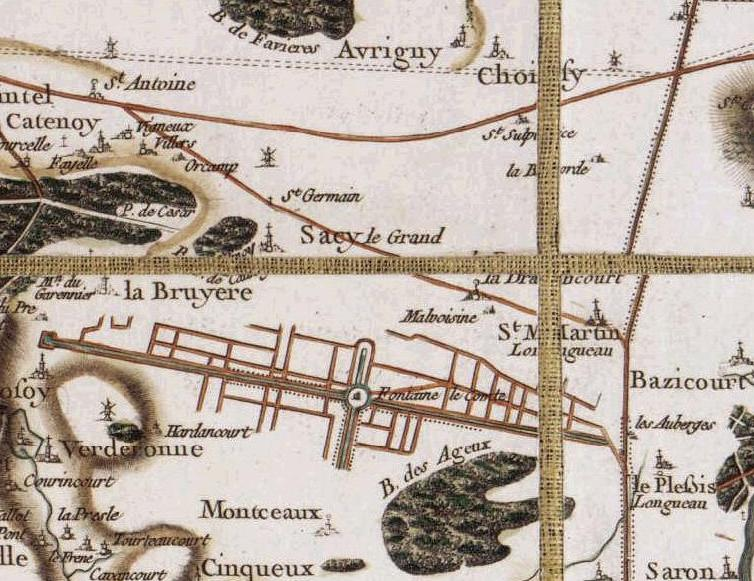
Sacy-le-Grand - Map by Cassini

Jan Hoeufft was born in 1578 in Liège in the Spanish Netherlands to one of the most powerful families of the United Provinces. His father, a Roermond timber merchant, had moved to Aachen, Liège and Heinsberg after converting to the Reformed Church. Not much is known about Jean Hoeufft's early life. He did not marry and had no known children.

Hoeufft eventually settled in Rouen, where there was religious freedom for Protestants for a time under Henry IV of France. (Note: See the French Wars of Religion and Protestantism in France) He was naturalized in 1601. He developed trade and ship owner activities trading between Spain and the United Provinces. From 1609 until 1616, he was deeply involved in the salt trade from Hiers-Brouage, along with his brother Dirck, based in Dordrecht. They supplied ships to the East India Company, and in 1620 they commissioned a ship-of-war to be built in Amsterdam for Charles, Duke of Guise.

By 1621 Hoeufft was appointed chamberlain to Louis XIII. In the 1620s he was involved in arms trading for Charles Gonzaga, Duke of Nevers. In 1628 he was allowed to collect taxes, and thus became an agent of Richelieu, who used his connections to raise money on the Dutch money market. In the 1630s he became a banker.

Hoeufft repeatedly advanced funds to the King, and took part in major financial deals. In 1634 Hoeufft participated in peace talks between the Dutch and Spain, in which Jules Mazarin and Frederick Henry, Prince of Orange were also involved. Hoeufft played a key part in diplomatic negotiations, despite having no official authority to do so. His appointment as Commissioner of the States General of the Netherlands was formalized in 1637.

In 1639 his house in Rouen was sacked as part of the religious wars; it is likely he moved to La Rochelle or Paris. In 1643 he obtained the fief Fontaine-le-Comte, a former lake near Sacy-le-Grand.

Hoeufft became treasurer and Secretary to Louis XIV, holding those roles until his death in 1651.

=== Arms dealer and financier ===
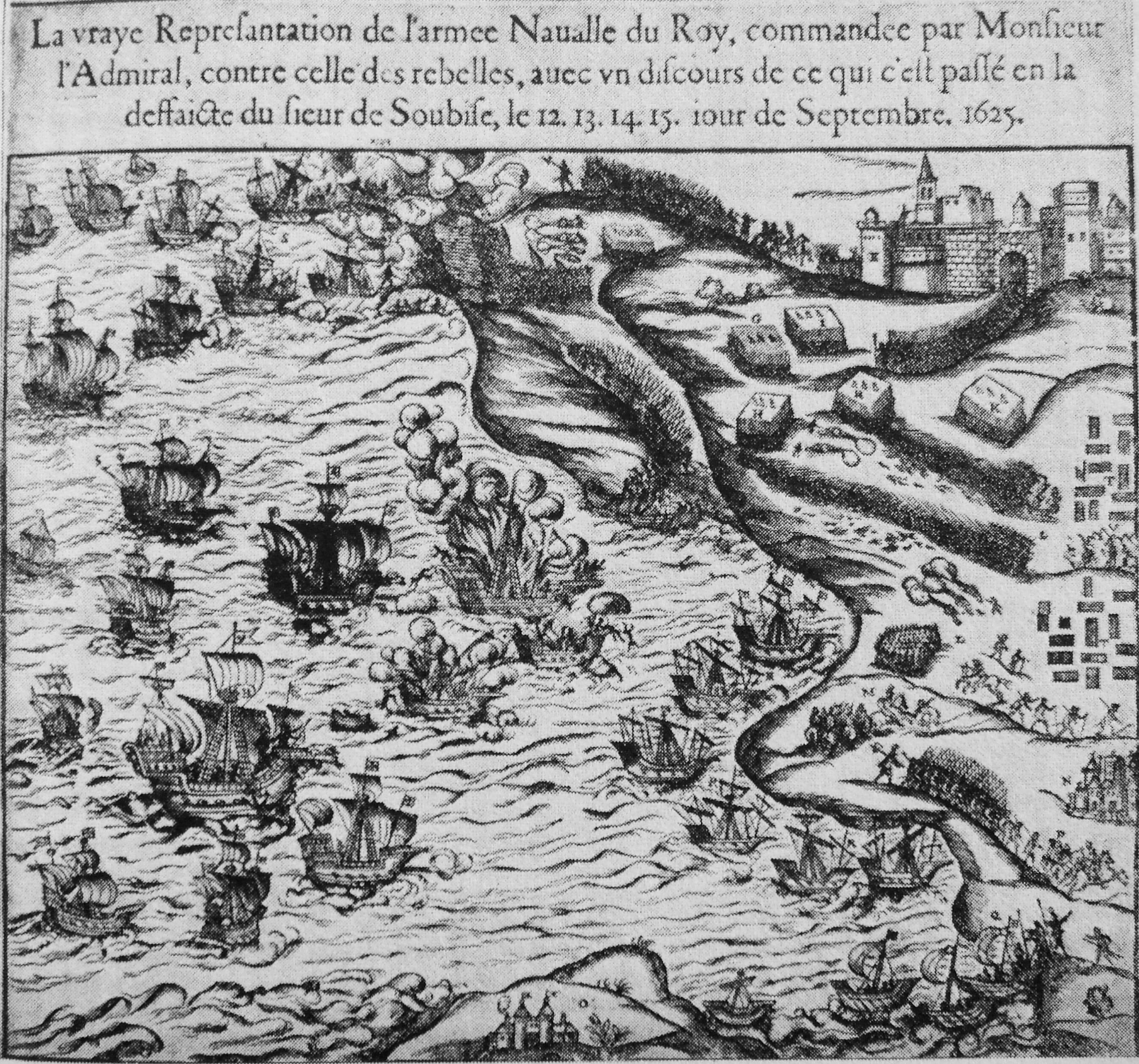
Capture of Île de Ré by Charles, Duke of Guise on September 16th, 1625

At the time of the Thirty Years' War, arms dealing was a highly lucrative business in Europe. Hoeufft, described by a contemporary as “‘a man capable of speaking and acting’ as well as ‘[having] money to distribute to people should there be need,’” was well-suited to the job. Hoeufft dealt with Axel Oxenstierna, Johan Adler Salvius, Hugo Grotius, Abraham de Wicquefort and Adriaen Pauw on the French support for the Swedish army; the money had to be allocated to the Amsterdam Wisselbank.

In finance, he was Cardinal Richelieu's banker for remitting subsidies during the Thirty Years War, and as banker to the Dukes of Saxe-Weimar, was charged with building financial links between the courts of France and Weimar.

Hoeufft occupied a prominent place in the network of political interests that bound together France’s structure of alliances during the Thirty Years War. "In some sense, his political interests were so tightly interwoven with his financial and mercantile interests that they are difficult to disentangle."

=== Hydraulic engineering ===
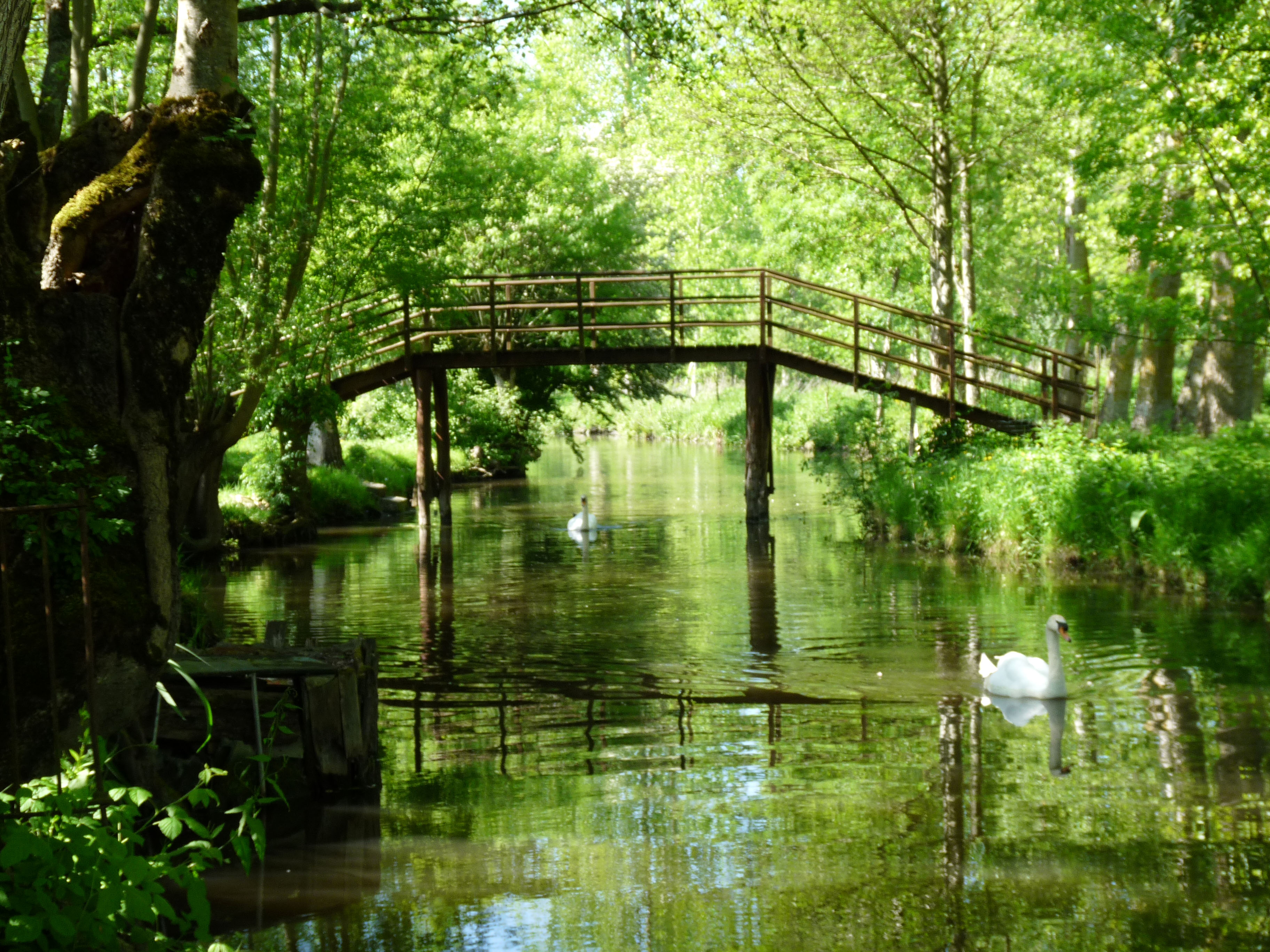
A footbridge over a canal in the Marais Poitevin

The Hoeufft family invested over a million livres in reclamation of lakes and wetlands in Picardie, Poitou and other parts of France. For the most part this work was carried out between 1642 and 1653 by Dutch engineers, such as Jan van Ens.

In 1650, Hoeufft was the director of the operation to drain the Poitou Marsh in western France. From the 1640s, one of his associates was David de la Croix, who married Hoeufft's niece, Marguerite Hoeufft. When Hoeufft died, de la Croix was among his beneficiaries and took over the Poitou marsh operation.

Frédéric Otto Fabrice de Gressenich, Councillor and Maître d'hotel du Roi, the son of Hoeufft's sister Anne, inherited the Sacy marshes along with his Hœufft cousins. As the only cousin living in France, Fabrice administered the lands on their behalf.

=== Death and legacy ===
Hoeufft died in Paris on 5 September 1651. He had two brothers and five sisters, who by then lived in Cologne, Dordrecht, London, and Utrecht.

Hoeufft bequeathed two million livres to the poor of the Reformed Church of Charenton, near Paris.

In 1736 Hoeufft's property at Petit Poitou was sold at Luçon in the Poitevin.

== See also ==
- Barthélemy Hervart – Huguenot banker
- Huguenots
