= Ralph Stephan =

American rower (1928–2018)

Personal information
- Full name: Ralph William Stephan Jr
- Nationality: American
- Born: November 16, 1928 Cleveland, Ohio, United States
- Died: April 30, 2018 (aged 89) Mount Shasta, California, United States

Sport
- Sport: Rowing

Ralph Stephan (November 16, 1928 – April 30, 2018) was an American rower. He and John Wade competed in the men's coxless pair event at the 1948 Summer Olympics.
