= North Shore Rowing Club =

Australian rowing club

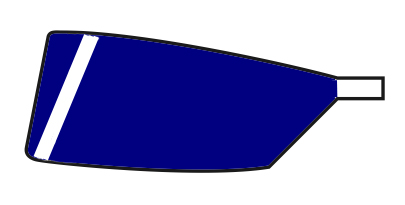
- Location: Longueville, Sydney
- Home water: Lane Cove River, Sydney Harbour
- Founded: 6 August 1879
- Affiliations: NSW Rowing Association
- Website: Northshorerowingclub.org.au

North Shore Rowing Club is the oldest sporting club on the north side of Sydney Harbour in Sydney, Australia formed in 1879. It has occupied its current site on the Lane Cove River at Yacht Bay, Longueville since 1933. The club has a focus on masters, juniors and social rowing. The club conducts an annual corporate regatta and a learn-to-row program.

== History ==
Sir George Dibbs, a three-time Premier of New South Wales was one of the instigators of a public meeting held in July 1879 at Milsons Point to consider the prospects of establishing a rowing club on Sydney harbour's north side. The following month at the School of Arts in St Leonards a committee was elected and an enrolment program for members was commenced.

The club was the fourth senior rowing club to be formed in Sydney with only the Sydney, Mercantile and Glebe clubs in existence when North Shore came into being in 1879.

The first boatshed was built on the western side of Careening Cove at the bottom of Willoughby Street and an opening ceremony took place on Saturday 15 November 1879, when a Regatta was held. The club met opposition from a local government member regarding the site it had secured and in 1890 voluntarily vacated the Willoughby Street site and moved the clubhouse to the opposite side of Careening Cove where a Mr. John Wilson owned a water frontage. By 1894, the club had 113 members and 14 boats and was considering a new and more ample boathouse site.

A third location was secured in 1903 at the head of Careening Cove after the Committee negotiated a lease with the Harbour Trust. The shed was built that same year, a 65 ft by 50 ft two-storied structure, roughly twice as big as the old shed. Ferry traffic, choppy water and the site's exposure to Sydney's southerly winds made the site less than ideal for preparing racing crews and in 1929 the club built a branch clubhouse and training facility at its current location just above Longueville Wharf on the Lane Cove River. All the club's activities were transferred to this shed in 1937 and it has operated from there since.

== Club presidents ==
- Spencer Grace was club president for over two decades retiring in 1998 aged 91.
- Sue Wannan was the club president in 2012.

== Members ==
Olympic representative members include:

- Spencer Grace OAM (1907–1999) competed at London 1948 in the coxless pair with Ted Bromley. He was captain of the club from 1934 to 1939 and its president till 1988.
- Maurice Grace and Peter Raper raced the Australian coxless pair at the 1956 Melbourne Olympics and placed fourth.

Notable past members include:

- Ted Bromley (1912–2004) was a Mosman Rowing Club member when he competed at London 1948 in the coxless pair and for many years after but he rowed with Spencer Grace from North Shore later in life and was keen supporter of the club.
- Doug Bowden coxed, coached and administered at the club from the 1930s through to the 1960s. He was a competitive member when he coxed two New South Wales King's Cup victories and steered the Australian eight to a silver medal at the 1938 British Empire Games.
- Frank Lowy AC is a member of the club and donated an eight in 1994.
