= Pércio Zancani =

Brazilian rower (1927–1992)

Personal information
- Born: 11 November 1927 Porto Alegre, Brazil
- Died: 1992 (aged 64–65)

Sport
- Sport: Rowing

Pércio Zancani (11 November 1927 – 1992) was a Brazilian rower. He competed in the men's coxless pair event at the 1948 Summer Olympics. Zancani died in 1992.
