= Ted Bromley =

Australian rower (1912–2004)

Personal information
- Full name: Edward Robert Bromley
- Nationality: Australian
- Born: 4 July 1912 Mosman, New South Wales
- Died: 12 April 2004 (aged 91) Sydney, New South Wales

Sport
- Country: Australia
- Sport: Rowing
Medal record
Representing Australia
British Empire Games
Silver medal – second place	1938 Sydney	M8+

Edward Robert Bromley (4 July 1912 – 12 April 2004) was an Australian rower. He competed in the men's coxless pair event at the 1948 Summer Olympics.

== Career ==
Bromley's senior club rowing was from the Mosman Rowing Club. Later in life he was an active participant and supporter of the Sydney's North Shore Rowing Club. In 1938 Bromley was one of five New South Welshman selected in the Australian men's eight for the 1938 Commonwealth Games. That eight took the silver medal behind the British crew.
