= Josef Kalt =

Swiss rower

Personal information
- Born: 20 September 1920
- Died: 21 February 2012 (aged 91)
- Relatives: Hans Kalt (brother)

Sport
- Sport: Rowing
Medal record
Men's rowing
Representing Switzerland
Olympic Games
Silver medal – second place	1948 London	Coxless pair

Josef Kalt (later Kalt-Arnet, 20 September 1920 – 21 February 2012) was a Swiss rower who competed in the 1948 Summer Olympics.

In 1948 he won the silver medal with his brother Hans Kalt in the coxless pair event.
