= Claude Dulong =

French woman historian

Claude Dulong-Sainteny
- Born: 12 June 1922; Limoges, France
- Died: 29 October 2017 (aged 95); Paris, France
- Citizenship: French
- Education: École Nationale des Chartes
- Spouse: Jean Sainteny
- Awards: Académie des sciences morales et politiques
- Scientific career
- Fields: History
- Workplaces: Versailles classified municipal library
- Thesis: Ciperis de Vignevaux, chanson de geste du début du XVe siècle. Etude et édition (1945)

Claude Dulong-Sainteny or Marguerite-Claude Badalo-Dulong or Claude Dulong (12 June 1922 in Limoges – 29 October 2017 in Paris) was a French historian.

== Biography ==
Graduate of the École Nationale des Chartes in 1945, then graduate in literature, she became librarian in particular in the Versailles classified municipal library.

She first became interested in the Middle Ages, her research focused thereafter on the 17th century.

She married Jean Sainteny and circulated among the gaulliste political circles.

In 1953, she took part in a seminar organized in Harvard by Henry Kissinger. This participation with Jean Sainteny provided a link between the American government and Ho Chi Minh for secret negotiations.

In 1995, she was elected in the Académie des sciences morales et politiques, in place of Jean Laloy.

Claude Dulong has also held positions at the United Nations Educational, Scientific, and Cultural Organisation (UNESCO) and at the Alliance Française.

== Bibliography ==
- Banquier du roi, Barthélemy Hervart, 1606-1676. Ségur. 1951.
- Trente Ans de diplomatie francaise en Allemagne. Louis XIV et l’Électeur de Mayence 1648-1678. - Paris: Plon (1956). 1 Kt., 261 S. 8°. Plon. 1956.
- Asie jaune, Asie rouge. Flammarion. 1958.
- L'Amour au XVIIe siècle. Hachette. 1969.
- La Vie quotidienne à l'Élysée au temps de Charles de Gaulle. Hachette. 1974.
- Anne d'Autriche : mère de Louis XIV. Hachette. 1980. ISBN 2-01-004474-6.
- La Vie quotidienne des femmes au Grand Siècle. Hachette. 1984. ISBN 978-2-01-008530-7.
- Le Mariage du Roi-Soleil. Albin Michel. 1986. ISBN 978-2-226-21394-5.
- Marie Mancini : la première passion de Louis XIV. Perrin. 1993. ISBN 2-262-00850-7.
- Amoureuses du Grand Siècle. Editions du Rocher. 1996. ISBN 978-2-268-02174-4.
- Mazarin. Perrin. 1999. ISBN 2-262-01285-7.
- Mazarin et l'argent: banquiers et prête-noms. Librairie Droz. 2002. ISBN 978-2-900791-50-9.

== Distinctions ==
- Officer of the Legion of Honour
- Officer of the Ordre des Arts et des Lettres
