= Hans Kalt =

Swiss rower (1924–2011)

Personal information
- Born: 26 March 1924
- Died: 2 January 2011 (aged 86)
- Relatives: Josef Kalt (brother)

Sport
- Sport: Rowing
Medal record
Men's rowing
Representing Switzerland
Olympic Games
Silver medal – second place	1948 London	Coxless pair
Bronze medal – third place	1952 Helsinki	Coxless pair
European Rowing Championships
Gold medal – first place	1950 Milan	Coxless pair
Bronze medal – third place	1951 Mâcon	Coxless pair

Hans Kalt (later Kalt-Jans, 26 March 1924 – 2 January 2011) was a Swiss rower who competed in the 1948 Summer Olympics and in the 1952 Summer Olympics.

In 1948 he won the silver medal with his brother Josef Kalt in the coxless pair event. Four years later he won the bronze medal with his partner Kurt Schmid in the coxless pair competition.
