= Colonial Service =

Imperial Colonial Service of The United Kingdom

The Colonial Service, also known as His/Her Majesty's Colonial Service and replaced in 1954 by Her Majesty's Overseas Civil Service (HMOCS), was the British government service that administered most of Britain's overseas possessions, under the authority of the Secretary of State for the Colonies and the Colonial Office in London. It did not operate in British India, where the same function was delivered by the Indian Civil Service (ICS), nor in the Anglo-Egyptian Sudan, which was administered by the Sudan Political Service (SPS), nor in the internally self-governing colony of Southern Rhodesia, which had its own civil service.

== History ==
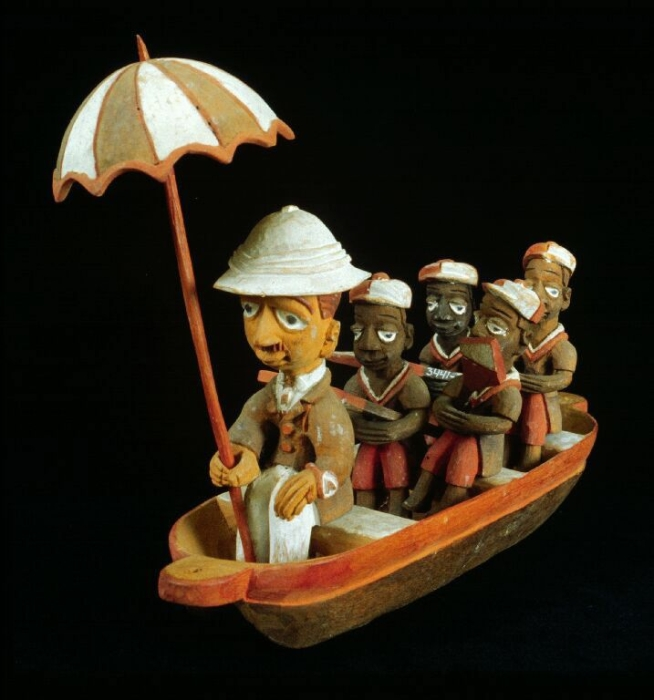
Yoruba sculptural depiction of a District Officer on a tour of inspection ("safari") in Nigeria, c.1940

The British Government's overall responsibility for the management of the territories overseas in the early 19th century lay with successive departments dealing with the various colonies and "plantations", until in 1854 a separate Colonial Office was created headed by a Secretary of State for the Colonies. That office was not responsible for the territories of the Indian Empire, including Burma, nor for Sudan which was linked to Egypt, nor for Southern Rhodesia which came under the Dominions Office. In 1966 the Colonial Office was merged with the Commonwealth Relations Office (CRO) to form the Commonwealth Office. In 1968 that Office was merged with the Foreign Office, renamed as the Foreign and Commonwealth Office (FCO), which maintained ultimate oversight of the dwindling residual HMOCS personnel until 1997.

The historical record of the Colonial Service begins with the publication on 30 March 1837, in the reign of King William IV, of the first set of what became known as Colonial Regulations, relating to "His Majesty's Colonial Service". It can therefore be said to have been the oldest of all the overseas services, predating the formation of the Indian Civil Service in 1858 and the Sudan Political Service in 1899, and in the course of its existence controlled 42 territories.

Initially there was no actual corps of officers employed in the colonies and "plantations", but that changed as the colonial empire grew during the rest of that century and into the 20th century. During the 1920s there were progressive moves towards the unification of the varied types of service that developed across the widely differing territories. In 1931 a unified Colonial Service was created, initially with sixteen sub-services, with four more added after the Second World War. Recruitment included candidates from the four self-governing Dominions: Canada, Australia, New Zealand and South Africa and a few of the colonies themselves, such as Southern Rhodesia, Malta, Cyprus, and some in the Caribbean. The officers were members of the civil service of the particular territory in which they served, as well as belonging to the relevant sub-service of the Colonial Service.

Finally, in 1954, they were all combined under the title of Her Majesty's Overseas Civil Service (HMOCS). That continued until 1 July 1997, when the largest remaining colony, Hong Kong, was handed over to the People’s Republic of China, designated as a Special Administrative Region. Thereafter the relatively few posts in the small remaining colonies (now British Overseas Territories) were filled by ad hoc British government appointments and overseen by two Ministers of the British government.

The formal end of HMOCS in 1997 was marked by a special commemorative service held in Westminster Abbey on 25 May 1999, attended by Queen Elizabeth II and Prince Philip, Duke of Edinburgh.

The physical memorial "To all who served the Crown in the Colonial Territories" is displayed in the South Cloister of Westminster Abbey, unveiled by H.M. The Queen in March 1966.

== Structure ==
During the 1930s the following sixteen sub-services were brought into the unified Colonial Service:

- Colonial Administrative Service
- Colonial Agricultural Service
- Colonial Audit Service
- Colonial Chemical Service
- Colonial Customs Service
- Colonial Education Service
- Colonial Forest Service
- Colonial Geological Survey Service
- Colonial Legal Service
- Colonial Medical Service
- Colonial Mines Service
- Colonial Police Service
- Colonial Postal Service
- Colonial Prisons Service
- Colonial Survey Service
- Colonial Veterinary Service

During the 1940s four more were added, bringing the total to twenty:

- Colonial Civil Aviation Service
- Colonial Engineering Service
- Colonial Research Service
- Queen Elizabeth's Overseas Nursing Service

The Colonial Administrative Service represented the authority of the colonial government in all respects. It was an elite of generalists, people mostly with University or other higher education qualifications, and appointments were made after selection interviews intended to assess candidates’ personality, character and motivation. From the mid-1920s, they attended a year’s training course at London, Oxford or Cambridge Universities. Administrative Officers were responsible for effecting government policy in the districts and provinces of each territory, as well as serving in the central Secretariat in the capital. First appointment was normally in the Provincial Administration. The starting rank was District Officer (cadet), during the first two years of probation; then District Officer (in some territories termed Assistant District Commissioner); rising to District Commissioner when given such charge, and Provincial Commissioner above that. Colonial governors were normally selected from appropriately senior officers. Exceptions were Gibraltar, Malta and Bermuda, formerly classified as "fortress" colonies, where until the post-war years the governors were normally military or naval officers, and thereafter were usually political appointees.

A few territories recruited female administrative officers, designated as Women Administrative Assistants. They filled supporting roles either in provincial headquarters or in the central Secretariat.

The first responsibility of the Colonial Administrative Service on was the maintenance of law and order. However, contrary to popular belief, this was largely implemented through the agency of indigenous police forces, local courts, district councils and local chiefs although there were variations between the different territories. In practice, Administrative Officers spent much of their time, especially after World War Two, in supervising and coordinating development of all kinds in their districts including medical services, schools, infrastructure, water supply, and provision of agricultural and veterinary services.

The other services all had their own specialist professional qualifications or relevant experience.

There were regular training courses for agriculture (in Trinidad), forestry, veterinary, medical, education, and police. For other professions such as audit, surveys, or fisheries, for example, there were ad hoc training arrangements.

Although Colonial Service/HMOCS officers were recruited by the British Colonial Office which then appointed them to serve in a particular territory, they were not employed by the British Government. They were employed and paid by the territorial government which was also responsible for their eventual retirement pension arrangements. As expatriate officers they were entitled to take "long leave" every few years (varying between territories) outside their territory of service. This distinguished them from the locally-engaged personnel in government service who were on local leave terms. The normal retirement age was 55, set originally to allow for the adverse effect the tropical climate had on their health. In some cases an officer could be transferred from one territory to another, by arrangement with the Colonial Office and the two colonial governments concerned.

== Size and termination ==
The overall size of the Colonial Service changed greatly through the 20th century. In 1900 there were only about 1,000 overseas posts. There was an expansion after the First World War, then a slow-down during the 1930s, with an estimated number of about 8,000 in 1938. Numbers boomed after the Second World War, rising to just over 11,000 posts in 1947, and a peak of about 18,000 in 1954. Thereafter the size of the Service shrank rapidly as most territories attained independence, until its formal end with the hand-over of Hong Kong to China on 1 July 1997. A number of HMOCS Police officers and others stayed on to serve the SAR government.

== The effects of independence on HM Overseas Civil Service personnel ==
The approach of independence in each territory had fundamental effects on HMOCS personnel there, depending on the outlook of the emerging local rulers and the stage of general social and economic development. In the case of Ceylon, which became independent as the Dominion of Ceylon in February 1948, the relatively few Colonial Service staff were smoothly replaced by local counterparts, and their retirement pensions continued to be paid as normal. The end of British rule in Palestine in that same year was quite different, with no ordered succession to the colonial officers. By 1960, in the African territories, special compensation schemes were introduced whereby the British Government agreed to finance payments through the territorial governments to HMOCS officers whose career employment would be ended prematurely. In some cases an "Inducement Allowance" was also paid to encourage officers to stay on.

The normal budgetary system in most territories was that every few years there would be a salaries review, which would include pensions, when increases would be made. There was consequently concern about whether the new independent governments would be willing to continue to pay the pension entitlements of their former "colonial masters", and at what exchange rates when there was no certainty about the long-term soundness of their financial and economic policies.

== The Overseas Service Pensioners' Association (OSPA) ==
In response to these concerns, the four existing pensioner associations of retired officers who had served in Ceylon, Malaya, West Africa and East and Central Africa joined together in 1960 to form a new body which could represent all existing and future pensioners of Her Majesty's Overseas Civil Service (HMOCS). The initial purpose was quite narrow, namely to persuade the British Government to provide annual pension increases for HMOCS pensioners to match those given to other civil servants in the Home Civil Service and the Foreign Service in Britain. This would be preferable to relying on a hope that the new overseas governments would continue to award increases as had been the practice before independence. This objective was achieved by the passing in December 1962 of the Pensions (Increase) Act which covered HMOCS pensioners like the others.

Then about a year later, in 1963/64, two newly independent countries, Somalia (incorporating the former British Somaliland Protectorate) and Zanzibar (after a revolution overthrowing the Sultan's rule), refused to continue pension payments to the former overseas officers, contrary to the agreements that had been reached with the governments at the time of independence. So OSPA had a new reason to negotiate with the British Government, and this time it took almost ten years of persistence by OSPA until the government passed the Overseas Pensions Act 1973. That was followed by several more years of negotiations with the various overseas governments concerned to complete the process. The outcome was that the British Government accepted responsibility for all HMOCS pension payments, and that system operates until now.

Over the next 40 years there was a succession of diverse pension problems relating to the Overseas Civil Service, so OSPA continued to represent the pensioners by working for satisfactory outcomes. OSPA's journal, The Overseas Pensioner, was published bi-annually from 1960 until OSPA's closure in October 2017. It included articles and book reviews about all aspects of the Colonial Empire and the related experiences of colonial officers and their families.

OSPA's closure was marked by a farewell event held in London on 8 June 2017. The guest of honour was Charles, Prince of Wales, who gave a speech expressing the thanks of Queen Elizabeth II and of himself for "the extraordinarily valuable contribution, let alone the personal sacrifices, made by members of the Overseas Civil Service (and its previous manifestations) during the nineteenth and twentieth centuries". The guest speaker, introduced by OSPA's president Lord Goodlad, was the historian Lord Hennessy of Nympsfield. He concluded by saying, "You did the State and the Crown very considerable, very special service, – and I salute you for it."

== Archives of the Colonial Service and HMOCS ==
The National Archives and the British Library, both in London, hold extensive records about all aspects of the British Empire, including the Colonial Service and HMOCS. There are particular collections in other centres, the chief ones being at:

- Oxford: in the Bodleian Library (located in the Weston Library), which now holds the records previously assembled at Rhodes House in Oxford where the Colonial Records Project was started in 1963;
- Cambridge: in the University Library, which holds the library and archive collections of the Royal Commonwealth Society. These include many personal accounts as well as government reports relating to Colonial Service. There are also the University's Centre for African Studies;
- London: The Senate House Library, University of London, holds the extensive archives collected by the Institute of Commonwealth Studies. Included within these are personal accounts of service overseas. One of the University's other Libraries is at SOAS University of London which holds the corporate records of SOAS as well as the collected archives of organisations and individuals that document British interaction with Africa, Asia and the Middle East. Together the collections provide a range of sources, both institutional and personal and in a variety of formats, that reflect many aspects of service overseas.
- Edinburgh: Main Library building of Edinburgh University Library;
- Aberystwyth: in the National Library of Wales;
- Bristol: in the Bristol Archives, which hold the British Empire and Commonwealth Collection, consisting mainly of personal archives (photographs, films and paper) collected by British people living and working in the former empire. It is actively taking in material and objects relating to colonial times;
- Vienna: The Vienna University Library holds records from the office of the former Overseas Service Pensioners’ Association (OSPA), including a complete set of the Overseas Pensioner journals. As at September 2019, the collection is undergoing cataloguing and not yet available to the public. The research project VOICES conducted 108 oral history interviews with former HMOCS officers between 2016 and 2018. In some cases, the interviews were supplemented with personal documents by the interviewees. As at September 2019, the material is being prepared for online publication in cooperation with the Ludwig Boltzmann Institute for Digital History.

For a record of published memoirs and related studies there is the very extensive “Administering Empire” annotated bibliographic Check List compiled by Terry Barringer of Wolfson College, Cambridge, published by the Institute of Commonwealth Studies, University of London.

== See also ==
- His Majesty's Home Civil Service
- His Majesty's Diplomatic Service
