= Chalat =

Chalat چلت
- Village
- Location within Iran
- Coordinates: 32°47′52″N 48°19′02″E
- Country: Iran
- Province: Khuzestan
- County: Andimeshk
- Bakhsh: Alvar-e Garmsiri
- Rural District: Qilab

Population (2006)
  - Total: 65
- Time zone: UTC+3:30 (IRST)
  - Summer (DST): UTC+4:30 (IRDT)

Chalat (Persian: چلت, also Romanized as Chelat; also known as Kalt) is a village in Qilab Rural District, Alvar-e Garmsiri District, Andimeshk County, Khuzestan Province, Iran. At the 2006 census, its population was 65, in 14 families.
