= Sudan Political Service =

Administrative section in Anglo-Egyptian Sudan

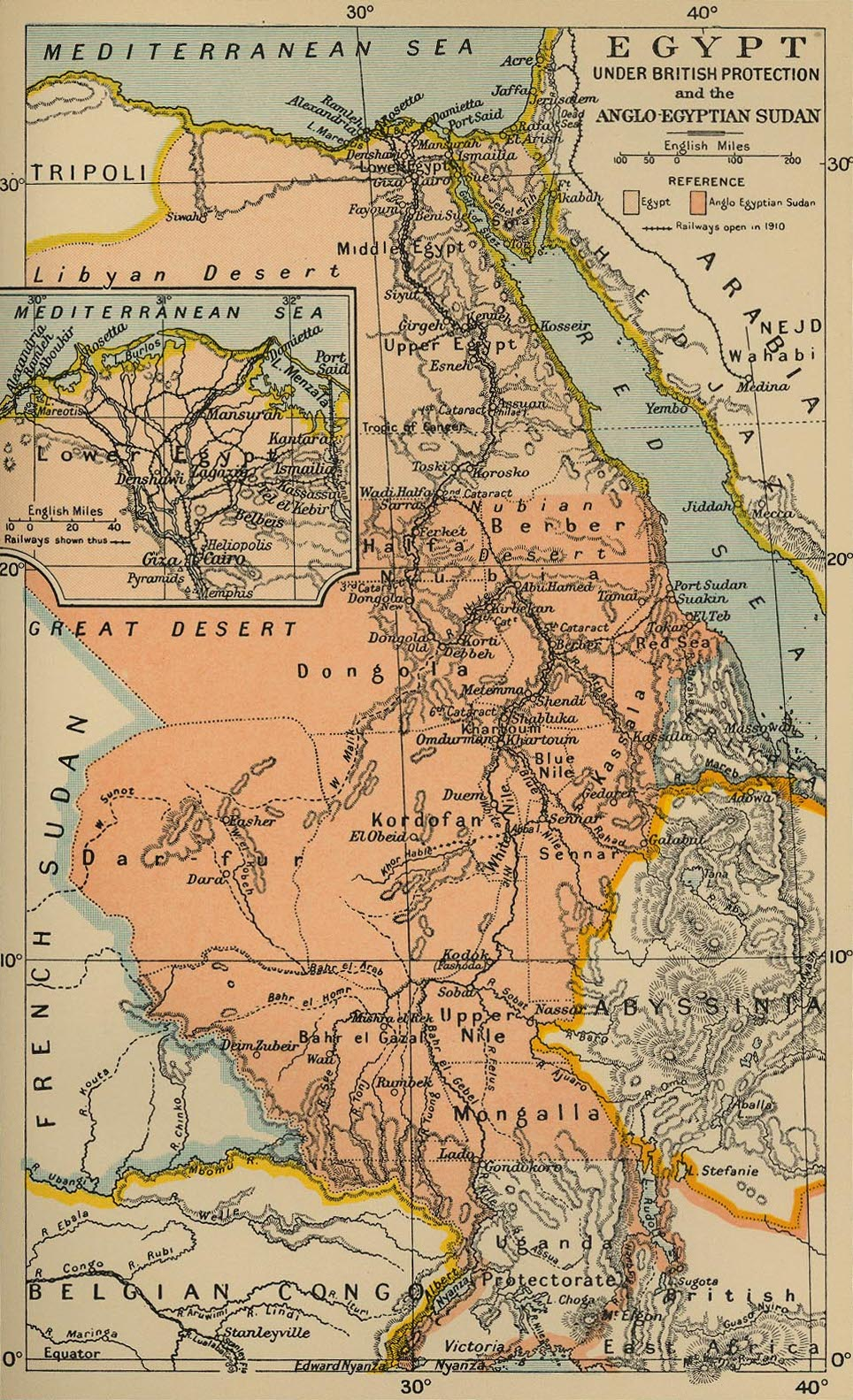
Map of Anglo-Egyptian Sudan

The Sudan Political Service was the name given to the cadre of British and Egyptian officials of the Sudan Civil Service who were mainly engaged in administrative functions in Anglo-Egyptian Sudan between 1899 and 1955 (or 1956). They were distinguished from those members of the Sudan Civil Service who served on military, departmental, or technical staffs.

A small service which had fewer than 400 members over the course of its entire existence, the Sudan Political Service had a reputation for being an elite service whose members took a genuine, if paternalistic, interest in the welfare of the Sudanese.

== Name ==
The Sudan Political Service acquired its name in the 1920s, though the name does not seem to have ever been officially sanctioned.

== Origins ==
Its founding is generally dated to the Anglo-Egyptian conquest of Sudan in 1899, when the Anglo-Egyptian Condominium Agreement established a condominium in Sudan, headed by a governor-general. At first, with the exception of some British civilian experts in specialized fields, administration of the territory in the provinces and towns was carried out by British officers of the Egyptian army.

Sir Evelyn Baring (later Lord Cromer), the British agent and consul-general, wished to establish a corps of civilian administrators permanently whose only duty was to administer Sudan. The first batch of specially-recruited civilian administrators were appointed in 1901.

Military officers, though they became a minority, nevertheless continued to serve in the Sudan Political Service, either on pensionable or contract terms. They tended to be posted to districts in the southern parts of the country, either in quasi-administered territories or districts bordering unadministered territory. Forming a distinct group within the Service, they became known as the "Bog Barons".

== Personnel and recruitment ==
Of the United Kingdom's main overseas civil services, the Sudan Political Service was by far the smallest: during the course of its entire existence, it comprised less than 400 members in total.

Unlike the Indian Civil Service and the Colonial Service, the recruitment process of the Sudan Political Service was informal in character and did not involve examinations. Candidates were interviewed by an ad hoc interviewing committee which met in London once a year.

No British officials were recruited after the 1952 intake, when three probationers were appointed. By then, recruitment was on contract terms, instead of permanent and pensionable terms.

Officials recruited to the Sudan Political Service had a reputation for recruiting those with superior athletic, rather than academic, records, though its officers had reasonable academic records as well. The historian Margery Perham wrote that the service (mainly comprising Oxford and Cambridge graduates) valued sporting prowess enough for Sudan to be described as a "nation of blacks governed by blues".

== Functions ==
Officers of the Sudan Political Service typically began their service as assistant district commissioners. From there, they could become district commissioners, deputy governors of provinces, and governors. They were also often assigned to the Secretariat in Khartoum for a period of time. Governors-general of the Sudan were not typically appointed from the ranks of the Sudan Political Service. Of the nine governors-general, only one, Sir Lee Stack, rose from the Political Service.

SPS officers could also be affected to special duties, such as setting up new departments. In addition, some were seconded or transferred to the Legal Department to become full-time judges, while others went to the Education Department as teacher or academic administrators.

== Demise ==
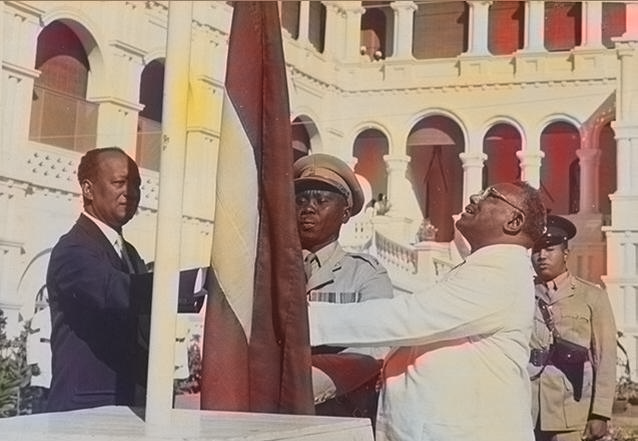
Sudan's flag raised at independence ceremony by the Prime Minister Isma'il Alazhari and opposition leader Muhammad Ahmad Mahgoub on 1 January 1956

There is some ambiguity as to the exact end date of the Sudan Political Service. Some time it to the Governor-General's office closed for the last time on the afternoon of 31 December 1955, while others adopt 1 January 1956, the date of Sudan's independence.

Unlike in the case of the Indian Civil Service and of the Colonial Administrative Service, SPS officers could not continue in the public service of independent Sudan, although some departmental officers in the Sudan Civil Service were allowed to continue in office. A Sudan Resettlement Bureau, staffed by two ex-SPS officers, was opened in London to help former officers find new employment.

Some former SPS officers joined the British Foreign Service and Colonial Administrative Service, while others took up a variety of professions. At least three became Members of Parliament. Wilfred Thesiger, perhaps the most famous former SPS officer, became one of the United Kingdom's leading explorers.
