= Landser, Haut-Rhin =

Commune in Grand Est, France

Landser
- Commune
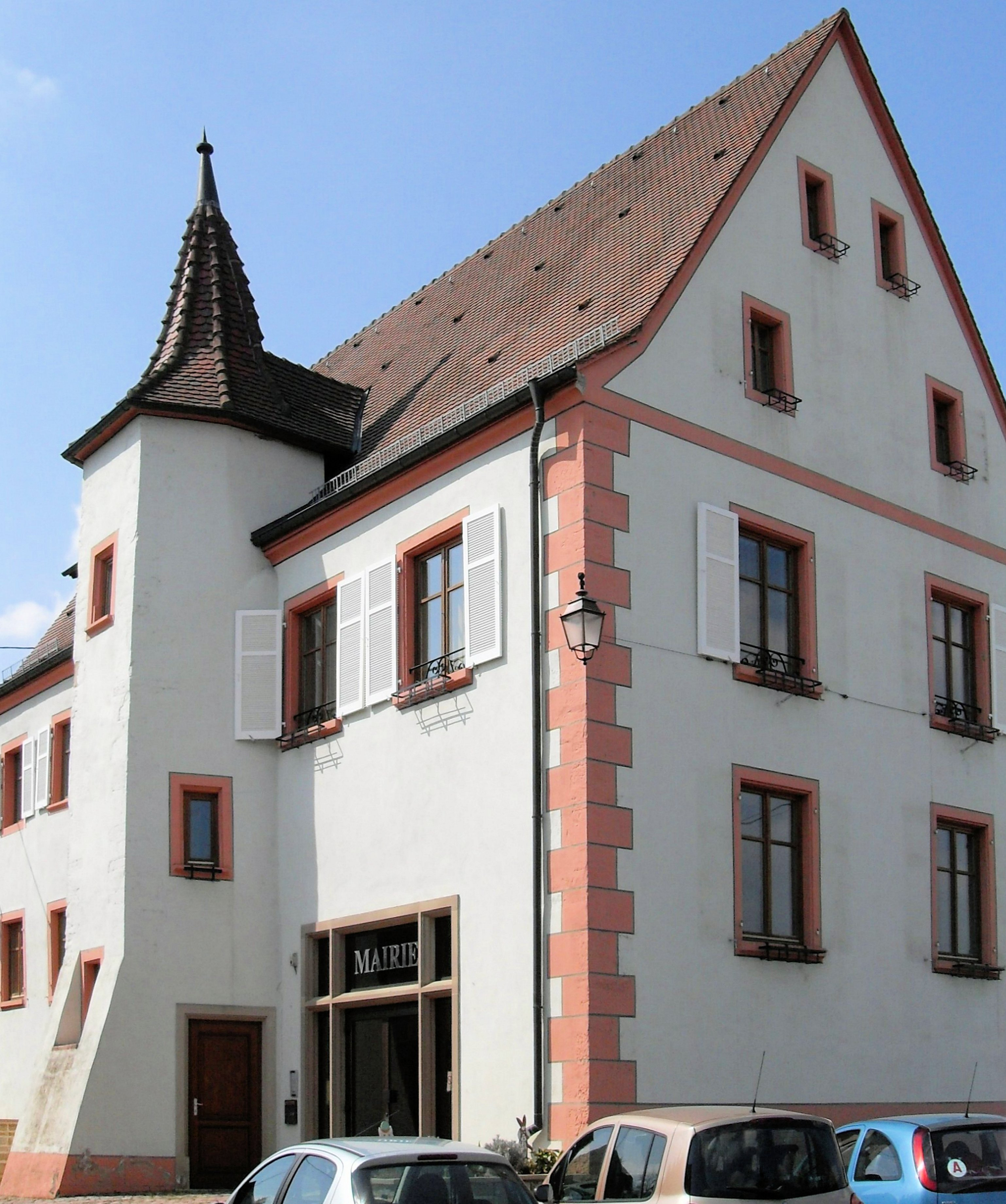
- The town hall

- Coat of arms
- Location of Landser
- Location within France Location within Grand Est
- Coordinates: 47°41′09″N 7°23′30″E
- Country: France
- Region: Grand Est
- Department: Haut-Rhin
- Arrondissement: Mulhouse
- Canton: Brunstatt-Didenheim
- Intercommunality: Saint-Louis Agglomération

Government
  - Mayor (2020–2026): Daniel Adrian
- Area^{1}: 3.04 km^{2} (1.17 sq mi)
- Elevation: 260 m (850 ft)
- Highest elevation: 348 m (1,142 ft)
- Lowest elevation: 254 m (833 ft)
- Population (2023): 1,633
  - Density: 537/km^{2} (1,390/sq mi)
- Time zone: UTC+01:00 (CET)
  - Summer (DST): UTC+02:00 (CEST)
- INSEE/Postal code: 68174 /68440
- ^{1} French Land Register data, which excludes lakes, ponds, glaciers > 1 km^{2} (0.386 sq mi or 247 acres) and river estuaries.

Landser is a commune in the Haut-Rhin department in Alsace in Northeastern France. As of 2023, the population of the commune was 1,633.

== See also ==
- Communes of the Haut-Rhin département
