= List of 1952 Summer Olympics medal winners =

The 1952 Summer Olympics were held in Helsinki, Finland, from 19 July to 3 August 1952.

== Athletics ==
=== Medal table ===
* Host nation (Finland)

Rank	Nation	Gold	Silver	Bronze	Total
1	United States	15	10	6	31
2	Czechoslovakia	4	1	0	5
3	Australia	3	0	1	4
4	Soviet Union	2	8	7	17
5	Jamaica	2	3	0	5
6	Italy	1	1	0	2
6	South Africa	1	1	0	2
8	Hungary	1	0	4	5
9	Sweden	1	0	2	3
10	Brazil	1	0	1	2
10	New Zealand	1	0	1	2
12	Luxembourg	1	0	0	1
13	Germany	0	3	5	8
14	France	0	2	0	2
15	Great Britain	0	1	4	5
16	Argentina	0	1	0	1
16	Netherlands	0	1	0	1
16	Switzerland	0	1	0	1
19	Finland*	0	0	1	1
19	Venezuela	0	0	1	1
Totals (20 entries)		33	33	33	99

=== Men's events ===
Games	Gold		Silver		Bronze	
100 metres	Lindy Remigino; United States	10.4	Herb McKenley; Jamaica	10.4	McDonald Bailey; Great Britain	10.4
200 metres	Andy Stanfield; United States	20.7	Thane Baker; United States	20.8	James Gathers; United States	20.8
400 metres	George Rhoden; Jamaica	45.9 OR	Herb McKenley; Jamaica	45.9	Ollie Matson; United States	46.8
800 metres	Mal Whitfield; United States	1:49.2	Arthur Wint; Jamaica	1:49.4	Heinz Ulzheimer; Germany	1:49.7
1500 metres	Josy Barthel; Luxembourg	3:45.2 OR	Bob McMillen; United States	3:45.2	Werner Lueg; Germany	3:45.4
5000 metres	Emil Zátopek; Czechoslovakia	14:06.6 OR	Alain Mimoun; France	14:07.4	Herbert Schade; Germany	14:08.6
10,000 metres	Emil Zátopek; Czechoslovakia	29:17.0 WR	Alain Mimoun; France	29:32.8	Aleksandr Anufriyev; Soviet Union	29:48.2
110 metres hurdles	Harrison Dillard; United States	13.7	Jack Davis; United States	13.7	Arthur Barnard; United States	14.1
400 metres hurdles	Charles Moore; United States	50.8 OR	Yuriy Lituyev; Soviet Union	51.3	John Holland; New Zealand	52.2
3000 metres steeplechase	Horace Ashenfelter; United States	8:45.4 OR	Vladimir Kazantsev; Soviet Union	8:51.6	John Disley; Great Britain	8:51.8
4 × 100 metres relay	United States; Dean Smith; Harrison Dillard; Lindy Remigino; Andy Stanfield	40.1	Soviet Union; Boris Tokarev; Levan Kalyayev; Levan Sanadze; Vladimir Sukharev	40.3	Hungary; László Zarándi; Géza Varasdi; György Csányi; Béla Goldoványi	40.5
4 × 400 metres relay	Jamaica; Arthur Wint; Leslie Laing; Herb McKenley; George Rhoden	3:03.9 WR	United States; Ollie Matson; Gene Cole; Charles Moore; Mal Whitfield	3:04.0	Germany; Günther Steines; Hans Geister; Heinz Ulzheimer; Karl-Friedrich Haas	3:06.6
Marathon	Emil Zátopek; Czechoslovakia	2:23:03 OR	Reinaldo Gorno; Argentina	2:25:35	Gustaf Jansson; Sweden	2:26:07
10 kilometres walk	John Mikaelsson; Sweden	45:02.8 OR	Fritz Schwab; Switzerland	45:41.0	Bruno Junk; Soviet Union	45:41.0
50 kilometres walk	Pino Dordoni; Italy	4:28:07.8 OR	Josef Doležal; Czechoslovakia	4:30:17.8	Antal Róka; Hungary	4:31:27.2
High jump	Walt Davis; United States	2.04 OR	Ken Wiesner; United States	2.01 m	José da Conceição; Brazil	1.98 m
Pole vault	Bob Richards; United States	4.55 m OR	Don Laz; United States	4.50 m	Ragnar Lundberg; Sweden	4.40 m
Long jump	Jerome Biffle; United States	7.57 m	Meredith Gourdine; United States	7.53 m	Ödön Földessy; Hungary	7.30 m
Triple jump	Adhemar Ferreira da Silva; Brazil	16.22 m WR	Leonid Shcherbakov; Soviet Union	15.98 m	Asnoldo Devonish; Venezuela	15.52 m
Shot put	Parry O'Brien; United States	17.41 OR	Darrow Hooper; United States	17.39 m	Jim Fuchs; United States	17.06 m
Discus throw	Sim Iness; United States	55.03 OR	Adolfo Consolini; Italy	53.78 m	James Dillion; United States	53.28 m
Hammer throw	József Csermák; Hungary	60.34 m WR	Karl Storch; Germany	58.86 m	Imre Németh; Hungary	57.74 m
Javelin throw	Cy Young; United States	73.78 m OR	Bill Miller; United States	72.46 m	Toivo Hyytiäinen; Finland	71.89 m
Decathlon	Bob Mathias; United States	7,887 pts WR	Milt Campbell; United States	6,975 pts	Floyd Simmons; United States	6,788 pts

=== Women's events ===
Games	Gold		Silver		Bronze	
100 metres	Marjorie Jackson; Australia	11.5	Daphne Hasenjäger; South Africa	11.8	Shirley Strickland de la Hunty; Australia	11.9
200 metres	Marjorie Jackson; Australia	23.7	Bertha Brouwer; Netherlands	24.2	Nadezhda Khnykina-Dvalishvili; Soviet Union	24.2
80 metres hurdles	Shirley Strickland de la Hunty; Australia	10.9 WR	Mariya Golubnichaya; Soviet Union	11.1	Maria Sander; Germany	11.1
4 × 100 metres relay	United States; Mae Faggs; Barbara Jones; Janet Moreau; Catherine Hardy	45.9 WR	Germany; Ursula Knab; Maria Sander; Helga Klein; Marga Petersen	45.9	Great Britain; Sylvia Cheeseman; June Foulds; Jean Desforges; Heather Armitage	46.2
High jump	Esther Brand; South Africa	1.67 m	Sheila Lerwill; Great Britain	1.65 m	Aleksandra Chudina; Soviet Union	1.63 m
Long jump	Yvette Williams; New Zealand	6.24 m OR	Aleksandra Chudina; Soviet Union	6.14 m	Shirley Cawley; Great Britain	5.92 m
Shot put	Galina Zybina; Soviet Union	15.28 m WR	Marianne Werner; Germany	14.57 m	Klavdia Tochonova; Soviet Union	14.50 m
Discus throw	Nina Romashkova; Soviet Union	51.42 m OR	Elizaveta Bagryantseva; Soviet Union	47.08 m	Nina Dumbadze; Soviet Union	46.29 m
Javelin throw	Dana Zátopková; Czechoslovakia	50.47 m OR	Aleksandra Chudina; Soviet Union	50.01 m	Yelena Gorchakova; Soviet Union	49.76 m

== Basketball ==
=== Medal table ===
Rank	NOC	Gold	Silver	Bronze	Total
1	United States	1	0	0	1
2	Soviet Union	0	1	0	1
3	Uruguay	0	0	1	1
Totals (3 entries)		1	1	1	3

=== Medalists ===
Event	Gold	Silver	Bronze
Men's	United States; Ron Bontemps; Marc Freiberger; Wayne Glasgow; Charlie Hoag; Bill Hougland; John Keller; Dean Kelley; Bob Kenney; Bob Kurland; Bill Lienhard; Clyde Lovellette; Frank McCabe; Dan Pippin; Howie Williams	Soviet Union; Stepas Butautas; Nodar Dzhordzhikiya; Anatoly Konev; Otar Korkiya; Heino Kruus; Ilmar Kullam; Justinas Lagunavičius; Joann Lõssov; Aleksandr Moiseyev; Yuri Ozerov; Kazys Petkevičius; Stasys Stonkus; Maigonis Valdmanis; Viktor Vlasov	Uruguay; Martín Acosta y Lara; Enrique Baliño; Victorio Cieslinskas; Héctor Costa; Nelson Demarco; Héctor García Otero; Tabaré Larre Borges; Adesio Lombardo; Roberto Lovera; Sergio Matto; Wilfredo Peláez; Carlos Roselló

== Boxing ==
=== Medal table ===
* Host nation (Finland)

Rank	Nation	Gold	Silver	Bronze	Total
1	United States	5	0	0	5
2	Italy	1	1	1	3
3	Poland	1	1	0	2
4	Finland*	1	0	4	5
5	Czechoslovakia	1	0	0	1
5	Hungary	1	0	0	1
7	Soviet Union	0	2	4	6
8	South Africa	0	1	3	4
9	Argentina	0	1	1	2
9	Germany	0	1	1	2
9	Romania	0	1	1	2
9	Sweden	0	1	1	2
13	Ireland	0	1	0	1
14	Bulgaria	0	0	1	1
14	Denmark	0	0	1	1
14	France	0	0	1	1
14	South Korea	0	0	1	1
Totals (17 entries)		10	10	20	40

=== Medalists ===
Games	Gold	Silver	Bronze
Flyweight (−51 kg)	Nate Brooks; United States	Edgar Basel; Germany	Anatoli Bulakov; Soviet Union
Flyweight (−51 kg)	Nate Brooks; United States	Edgar Basel; Germany	Willie Toweel; South Africa
Bantamweight (−54 kg)	Pentti Hämäläinen; Finland	John McNally; Ireland	Kang Joon-Ho; South Korea
Bantamweight (−54 kg)	Pentti Hämäläinen; Finland	John McNally; Ireland	Gennady Garbuzov; Soviet Union
Featherweight (−57 kg)	Ján Zachara; Czechoslovakia	Sergio Caprari; Italy	Joseph Ventaja; France
Featherweight (−57 kg)	Ján Zachara; Czechoslovakia	Sergio Caprari; Italy	Leonard Leisching; South Africa
Lightweight (−60 kg)	Aureliano Bolognesi; Italy	Aleksy Antkiewicz; Poland	Gheorghe Fiat; Romania
Lightweight (−60 kg)	Aureliano Bolognesi; Italy	Aleksy Antkiewicz; Poland	Erkki Pakkanen; Finland
Light welterweight (−63.5 kg)	Charles Adkins; United States	Viktor Mednov; Soviet Union	Bruno Visintin; Italy
Light welterweight (−63.5 kg)	Charles Adkins; United States	Viktor Mednov; Soviet Union	Erkki Mallenius; Finland
Welterweight (−67 kg)	Zygmunt Chychla; Poland	Sergei Scherbakov; Soviet Union	Günther Heidemann; Germany
Welterweight (−67 kg)	Zygmunt Chychla; Poland	Sergei Scherbakov; Soviet Union	Victor Jörgensen; Denmark
Light middleweight (−71 kg)	László Papp; Hungary	Theunis van Schalkwyk; South Africa	Boris Tishin; Soviet Union
Light middleweight (−71 kg)	László Papp; Hungary	Theunis van Schalkwyk; South Africa	Eladio Herrera; Argentina
Middleweight (−75 kg)	Floyd Patterson; United States	Vasile Tiță; Romania	Boris Nikolov; Bulgaria
Middleweight (−75 kg)	Floyd Patterson; United States	Vasile Tiță; Romania	Stig Sjölin; Sweden
Light heavyweight (−81 kg)	Norvel Lee; United States	Antonio Pacenza; Argentina	Anatoly Perov; Soviet Union
Light heavyweight (−81 kg)	Norvel Lee; United States	Antonio Pacenza; Argentina	Harry Siljander; Finland
Heavyweight (+81 kg)	Ed Sanders; United States	Ingemar Johansson; Sweden	Ilkka Koski; Finland
Heavyweight (+81 kg)	Ed Sanders; United States	Ingemar Johansson; Sweden	Andries Nieman; South Africa

== Canoeing ==
=== Medal table ===
* Host nation (Finland)

Rank	Nation	Gold	Silver	Bronze	Total
1	Finland*	4	1	1	6
2	Sweden	1	3	0	4
3	Czechoslovakia	1	1	1	3
4	France	1	0	1	2
5	Denmark	1	0	0	1
5	United States	1	0	0	1
7	Hungary	0	2	1	3
8	Austria	0	1	1	2
9	Canada	0	1	0	1
10	Germany	0	0	3	3
11	Soviet Union	0	0	1	1
Totals (11 entries)		9	9	9	27

=== Men's events ===
Games	Gold	Silver	Bronze
C-1 1000 metres	Josef Holeček; Czechoslovakia	János Parti; Hungary	Olavi Ojanperä; Finland
C-1 10000 metres	Frank Havens; United States	Gábor Novák; Hungary	Alfréd Jindra; Czechoslovakia
C-2 1000 metres	Denmark; Bent Peder Rasch; Finn Haunstoft	Czechoslovakia; Jan Brzák-Felix; Bohumil Kudrna	Germany; Egon Drews; Wilfried Soltau
C-2 10000 metres	France; Georges Turlier; Jean Laudet	Canada; Kenneth Lane; Donald Hawgood	Germany; Egon Drews; Wilfried Soltau
K-1 1000 metres	Gert Fredriksson; Sweden	Thorvald Strömberg; Finland	Louis Gantois; France
K-1 10000 metres	Thorvald Strömberg; Finland	Gert Fredriksson; Sweden	Michael Scheuer; Germany
K-2 1000 metres	Finland; Kurt Wires; Yrjö Hietanen	Sweden; Lars Glassér; Ingemar Hedberg	Austria; Maximilian Raub; Herbert Wiedermann
K-2 10000 metres	Finland; Kurt Wires; Yrjö Hietanen	Sweden; Gunnar Åkerlund; Hans Wetterström	Hungary; Ferenc Varga; József Gurovits

=== Women's event ===
Games	Gold	Silver	Bronze
K-1 500 metres	Sylvi Saimo; Finland	Gertrude Liebhart; Austria	Nina Savina; Soviet Union

== Cycling ==
=== Medal table ===
Rank	Nation	Gold	Silver	Bronze	Total
1	Italy	2	2	1	5
2	Australia	2	1	0	3
2	Belgium	2	1	0	3
4	South Africa	0	2	1	3
5	Germany	0	0	2	2
6	France	0	0	1	1
6	Great Britain	0	0	1	1
Totals (7 entries)		6	6	6	18

=== Road cycling ===
Games	Gold	Silver	Bronze
Individual road race	André Noyelle; Belgium	Robert Grondelaers; Belgium	Edi Ziegler; Germany
Team road race	Belgium; Robert Grondelaers; André Noyelle; Lucien Victor	Italy; Dino Bruni; Gianni Ghidini; Vincenzo Zucconelli	France; Jacques Anquetil; Claude Rouer; Alfred Tonello

=== Track cycling ===
Games	Gold	Silver	Bronze
Team pursuit	Italy; Marino Morettini; Loris Campana; Mino de Rossi; Guido Messina	South Africa; Alfred Swift; George Estman; Robert Fowler; Thomas Shardelow	Great Britain; Ronald Stretton; Donald Burgess; George Newberry; Alan Newton
Sprint	Enzo Sacchi; Italy	Lionel Cox; Australia	Werner Potzernheim; Germany
Tandem	Australia; Lionel Cox; Russell Mockridge	South Africa; Raymond Robinson; Thomas Shardelow	Italy; Antonio Maspes; Cesare Pinarello
Time trial	Russell Mockridge; Australia	Marino Morettini; Italy	Raymond Robinson; South Africa

== Diving ==
=== Medal table ===
Rank	Nation	Gold	Silver	Bronze	Total
1	United States	4	2	3	9
2	France	0	1	0	1
2	Mexico	0	1	0	1
4	Germany	0	0	1	1
Totals (4 entries)		4	4	4	12

=== Men's events ===
Event	Gold	Silver	Bronze
3 m springboard	David Browning; United States	Miller Anderson; United States	Bob Clotworthy; United States
10 m platform	Samuel Lee; United States	Joaquín Capilla; Mexico	Günther Haase; Germany

=== Women's events ===
Event	Gold	Silver	Bronze
3 m springboard	Pat McCormick; United States	Madeleine Moreau; France	Zoe-Ann Olsen-Jensen; United States
10 m platform	Pat McCormick; United States	Paula Jean Myers; United States	Juno Stover-Irwin; United States

== Equestrian events ==
=== Medal table ===
Rank	Nation	Gold	Silver	Bronze	Total
1	Sweden	4	0	0	4
2	France	1	1	1	3
3	Great Britain	1	0	0	1
4	Chile	0	2	0	2
5	Germany	0	1	3	4
6	Denmark	0	1	0	1
6	Switzerland	0	1	0	1
8	United States	0	0	2	2
Totals (8 entries)		6	6	6	18

=== Medalists ===
Games	Gold	Silver	Bronze
Individual dressage	Henri Saint Cyr and Master Rufus (SWE)	Lis Hartel and Jubilee (DEN)	André Jousseaume and Harpagon (FRA)
Team dressage	Sweden; Henri Saint Cyr and Master Rufus; Gustaf Adolf Boltenstern Jr. and Krest; Gehnäll Persson and Knaust	Switzerland; Gottfried Trachsel and Kursus; Henri Chammartin and Wöhler; Gustav Fischer and Soliman	Germany; Heinz Pollay and Adular; Ida von Nagel and Afrika; Fritz Thiedemann and Chronist
Individual eventing	Hans von Blixen-Finecke Jr. and Jubal (SWE)	Guy Lefrant and Verdun (FRA)	Wilhelm Büsing and Hubertus (GER)
Team eventing	Sweden; Hans von Blixen-Finecke Jr. and Jubal; Olof Stahre and Komet; Folke Frölén and Fair	Germany; Wilhelm Büsing and Hubertus; Klaus Wagner and Dachs; Otto Rothe and Trux von Kamax	United States; Charles Hough Jr. and Cassivellannus; Walter Staley Jr. and Craigwood Park; John Wofford and Benny Grimes
Individual jumping	Pierre Jonquères d'Oriola and Ali Baba (FRA)	Óscar Cristi and Bambi (CHI)	Fritz Thiedemann and Meteor (GER)
Team jumping	Great Britain; Wilfred White and Nizefela; Douglas Stewart and Aherlow; Harry Llewellyn and Foxhunter	Chile; Óscar Cristi and Bambi; César Mendoza and Pillán; Ricardo Echeverría and Lindo Peal	United States; William Steinkraus and Hollandia; Arthur McCashin and Miss Budweiser; John William Russell and Democrat

== Fencing ==
=== Medal table ===
Rank	Nation	Gold	Silver	Bronze	Total
1	Italy	3	4	1	8
2	Hungary	2	2	2	6
3	France	2	0	1	3
4	Sweden	0	1	0	1
5	Switzerland	0	0	2	2
6	Denmark	0	0	1	1
Totals (6 entries)		7	7	7	21

=== Men's events ===
Event	Gold	Silver	Bronze
Individual épée	Edoardo Mangiarotti; Italy	Dario Mangiarotti; Italy	Oswald Zappelli; Switzerland
Team épée	Italy; Roberto Battaglia; Carlo Pavesi; Franco Bertinetti; Giuseppe Delfino; Dario Mangiarotti; Edoardo Mangiarotti	Sweden; Berndt-Otto Rehbinder; Bengt Ljungquist; Per Hjalmar Carleson; Carl Forssell; Sven Fahlman; Lennart Magnusson	Switzerland; Otto Rüfenacht; Paul Meister; Oswald Zappelli; Paul Barth; Willy Fitting; Mario Valota
Individual foil	Christian d'Oriola; France	Edoardo Mangiarotti; Italy	Manlio Di Rosa; Italy
Team foil	France; Christian d'Oriola; Jacques Lataste; Jehan Buhan; Claude Netter; Jacques Noël; Adrien Rommel	Italy; Giancarlo Bergamini; Antonio Spallino; Manlio Di Rosa; Giorgio Pellini; Edoardo Mangiarotti; Renzo Nostini	Hungary; Endre Palócz; Tibor Berczelly; Endre Tilli; Aladár Gerevich; Jozsef Sakovics; Lajos Maszlay
Individual sabre	Pál Kovács; Hungary	Aladár Gerevich; Hungary	Tibor Berczelly; Hungary
Team sabre	Hungary; Bertalan Papp; László Rajcsányi; Rudolf Kárpáti; Tibor Berczelly; Aladár Gerevich; Pál Kovács	Italy; Giorgio Pellini; Vincenzo Pinton; Renzo Nostini; Mauro Racca; Gastone Darè; Roberto Ferrari	France; Maurice Piot; Jacques Lefèvre; Bernard Morel; Jean Laroyenne; Jean Francois Tournon; Jean Levavasseur

=== Women's event ===
Event	Gold	Silver	Bronze
Individual foil	Irene Camber; Italy	Ilona Elek; Hungary	Karen Lachmann; Denmark

== Field hockey ==
=== Medal table ===
Rank	Nation	Gold	Silver	Bronze	Total
1	India	1	0	0	1
2	Netherlands	0	1	0	1
3	Great Britain	0	0	1	1
Totals (3 entries)		1	1	1	3

=== Medalists ===
Games	Gold	Silver	Bronze
Men's	India; K. D. Singh; Leslie Claudius; Meldric Daluz; Keshav Dutt; Chinadorai Deshmutu; Ranganathan Francis; Raghbir Lal; Govind Perumal; Muniswamy Rajgopal; Balbir Singh Sr. Randhir Singh Gentle; C. S. Dubey; Udham Singh; Dharam Singh; Grahanandan Singh; Chaman Singh Gurung; Jaswant Rai	Netherlands; Jules Ancion; André Boerstra; Harry Derckx; Han Drijver; Dick Esser; Roepie Kruize; Dick Loggere; Lau Mulder; Eddy Tiel; Wim van Heel; Leonard Wery	Great Britain; Denys Carnill (capt); John Cockett; John Conroy; Graham Dadds; Derek Day; Dennis Eagan; Robin Fletcher; W A Lindsay-Smith; Roger Midgley; Richard Norris; Neil Nugent; Anthony Nunn; Anthony John Robinson; P D R Smith; John Paskin Taylor; S T Theobald; Eric Claude Newby

== Football ==
=== Medal table ===
Rank	Nation	Gold	Silver	Bronze	Total
1	Hungary	1	0	0	1
2	Yugoslavia	0	1	0	1
3	Sweden	0	0	1	1
Totals (3 entries)		1	1	1	3

=== Medalists ===
Event	Gold	Silver	Bronze
Men's	Hungary; Gyula Grosics; Jenő Dalnoki; Imre Kovács; László Budai; Ferenc Puskás; Zoltán Czibor; Lajos Csordás; Jenő Buzánszky; Gyula Lóránt; Mihály Lantos; József Bozsik; József Zakariás; Nándor Hidegkuti; Sándor Kocsis; Péter Palotás	Yugoslavia; Vladimir Beara; Branko Stanković; Tomislav Crnković; Zlatko Čajkovski; Ivan Horvat; Vujadin Boškov; Tihomir Ognjanov; Rajko Mitić; Bernard Vukas; Stjepan Bobek; Branko Zebec; Dušan Cvetković; Milorad Diskić; Ratko Čolić; Slavko Luštica; Zdravko Rajkov; Vladimir Čonč; Vladimir Firm	Sweden; Karl Svensson; Lennart Samuelsson; Erik Nilsson; Holger Hansson; Bengt Gustavsson; Gösta Lindh; Sylve Bengtsson; Gösta Löfgren; Ingvar Rydell; Yngve Brodd; Gösta Sandberg; Olof Åhlund

== Gymnastics ==
=== Medal table ===
* Host nation (Finland)

Rank	Nation	Gold	Silver	Bronze	Total
1	Soviet Union	9	11	2	22
2	Switzerland	2	2	3	7
3	Hungary	2	1	5	8
4	Sweden	2	0	0	2
5	Japan	0	2	2	4
6	Germany	0	1	0	1
6	Poland	0	1	0	1
8	Czechoslovakia	0	0	1	1
8	Finland*	0	0	1	1
Totals (9 entries)		15	18	14	47

=== Men’s events ===
Games	Gold	Silver	Bronze
Individual all-around	Viktor Chukarin; Soviet Union	Hrant Shahinyan; Soviet Union	Josef Stalder; Switzerland
Team all-around	Soviet Union; Vladimir Belyakov; Iosif Berdiev; Viktor Chukarin; Yevgeny Korolkov; Dmytro Leonkin; Valentin Muratov; Mikhail Perelman; Hrant Shahinyan	Switzerland; Hans Eugster; Ernst Fivian; Ernst Gebendinger; Jack Günthard; Hans Schwarzentruber; Josef Stalder; Melchior Thalmann; Jean Tschabold	Finland; Paavo Aaltonen; Kalevi Laitinen; Onni Lappalainen; Kaino Lempinen; Berndt Lindfors; Olavi Rove; Heikki Savolainen; Kalevi Viskari
Floor exercise	William Thoresson; Sweden	Jerzy Jokiel; Poland	none awarded (as there was a tie for silver)
Floor exercise	William Thoresson; Sweden	Tadao Uesako; Japan	none awarded (as there was a tie for silver)
Horizontal bar	Jack Günthard; Switzerland	Josef Stalder; Switzerland	none awarded (as there was a tie for silver)
Horizontal bar	Jack Günthard; Switzerland	Alfred Schwarzmann; Germany	none awarded (as there was a tie for silver)
Parallel bars	Hans Eugster; Switzerland	Viktor Chukarin; Soviet Union	Josef Stalder; Switzerland
Pommel horse	Viktor Chukarin; Soviet Union	Hrant Shahinyan; Soviet Union	none awarded (as there was a tie for silver)
Pommel horse	Viktor Chukarin; Soviet Union	Yevgeny Korolkov; Soviet Union	none awarded (as there was a tie for silver)
Rings	Hrant Shahinyan; Soviet Union	Viktor Chukarin; Soviet Union	Dmytro Leonkin; Soviet Union
Rings	Hrant Shahinyan; Soviet Union	Viktor Chukarin; Soviet Union	Hans Eugster; Switzerland
Vault	Viktor Chukarin; Soviet Union	Masao Takemoto; Japan	Takashi Ono; Japan
Vault	Viktor Chukarin; Soviet Union	Masao Takemoto; Japan	Tadao Uesako; Japan

=== Women's events ===
Games	Gold	Silver	Bronze
Individual all-around	Maria Gorokhovskaya; Soviet Union	Nina Bocharova; Soviet Union	Margit Korondi; Hungary
Team all-around	Soviet Union; Nina Bocharova; Pelageya Danilova; Maria Gorokhovskaya; Ekaterina Kalinchuk; Galina Minaicheva; Galina Shamrai; Galina Urbanovich; Medea Jugeli	Hungary; Andrea Bodó; Irén Daruházi-Karcsics; Erzsébet Gulyás-Köteles; Ágnes Keleti; Margit Korondi; Edit Perényi-Weckinger; Olga Tass; Mária Kövi-Zalai	Czechoslovakia; Hana Bobková; Alena Chadimová; Jana Rabasová; Alena Reichová; Matylda Šínová; Božena Srncová; Věra Vančurová; Eva Věchtová
Balance beam	Nina Bocharova; Soviet Union	Maria Gorokhovskaya; Soviet Union	Margit Korondi; Hungary
Floor exercise	Ágnes Keleti; Hungary	Maria Gorokhovskaya; Soviet Union	Margit Korondi; Hungary
Uneven bars	Margit Korondi; Hungary	Maria Gorokhovskaya; Soviet Union	Ágnes Keleti; Hungary
Vault	Ekaterina Kalinchuk; Soviet Union	Maria Gorokhovskaya; Soviet Union	Galina Minaicheva; Soviet Union
Team, portable apparatus	Sweden; Karin Lindberg; Ann-Sofi Pettersson; Evy Berggren; Gun Röring; Göta Pettersson; Ingrid Sandahl; Hjördis Nordin; Vanja Blomberg	Soviet Union; Maria Gorokhovskaya; Nina Bocharova; Galina Minaicheva; Galina Urbanovich; Pelageya Danilova; Galina Shamrai; Medea Jugeli; Ekaterina Kalinchuk	Hungary; Margit Korondi; Ágnes Keleti; Edit Perényi-Weckinger; Olga Tass; Erzsébet Gulyás-Köteles; Mária Kövi-Zalai; Andrea Bodó; Irén Daruházi-Karcsics

== Modern pentathlon ==
=== Medal table ===
* Host nation (Finland)

Rank	Nation	Gold	Silver	Bronze	Total
1	Hungary	1	1	1	3
2	Sweden	1	1	0	2
3	Finland*	0	0	1	1
Totals (3 entries)		2	2	2	6

=== Medalists ===
Event	Gold	Silver	Bronze
Individual	Lars Hall; Sweden	Gábor Benedek; Hungary	István Szondy; Hungary
Team	Hungary; Gábor Benedek; Aladár Kovácsi; István Szondy	Sweden; Lars Hall; Thorsten Lindqvist; Claes Egnell	Finland; Olavi Mannonen; Lauri Vilkko; Olavi Rokka

== Rowing ==
=== Medal table ===
* Host nation (Finland)

Rank	Nation	Gold	Silver	Bronze	Total
1	United States	2	0	1	3
2	Soviet Union	1	2	0	3
3	France	1	1	0	2
4	Argentina	1	0	0	1
4	Czechoslovakia	1	0	0	1
4	Yugoslavia	1	0	0	1
7	Australia	0	1	1	2
7	Switzerland	0	1	1	2
9	Belgium	0	1	0	1
9	Germany	0	1	0	1
11	Denmark	0	0	1	1
11	Finland*	0	0	1	1
11	Poland	0	0	1	1
11	Uruguay	0	0	1	1
Totals (14 entries)		7	7	7	21

=== Medalists ===
Games	Gold	Silver	Bronze
Single sculls	Yuriy Tyukalov; Soviet Union	Mervyn Wood; Australia	Teodor Kocerka; Poland
Double sculls	Argentina; Tranquilo Cappozzo; Eduardo Guerrero	Soviet Union; Heorhiy Zhylin; Ihor Yemchuk	Uruguay; Miguel Seijas; Juan Rodríguez
Coxless pair	United States; Charlie Logg; Tom Price	Belgium; Michel Knuysen; Bob Baetens	Switzerland; Kurt Schmid; Hans Kalt
Coxed pair	France; Raymond Salles; Gaston Mercier; Bernard Malivoire	Germany; Heinz Manchen; Helmut Heinhold; Helmut Noll	Denmark; Svend Ove Pedersen; Poul Svendsen; Jørgen Frantzen
Coxless four	Yugoslavia; Duje Bonačić; Velimir Valenta; Mate Trojanović; Petar Šegvić	France; Pierre Blondiaux; Jean-Jacques Guissart; Marc Bouissou; Roger Gautier	Finland; Veikko Lommi; Kauko Wahlsten; Oiva Lommi; Lauri Nevalainen
Coxed four	Czechoslovakia; Karel Mejta; Jiří Havlis; Jan Jindra; Stanislav Lusk; Miroslav Koranda	Switzerland; Rico Bianchi; Karl Weidmann; Heini Scheller; Émile Ess; Walter Leiser	United States; Carl Lovsted; Al Ulbrickson; Richard Wahlstrom; Matt Leanderson; Al Rossi
Eight	United States; Frank Shakespeare; William Fields; James Dunbar; Richard Murphy; Robert Detweiler; Henry Proctor; Wayne Frye; Edward Stevens; Charles Manring	Soviet Union; Yevgeny Brago; Vladimir Rodimushkin; Aleksey Komarov; Igor Borisov; Slava Amiragov; Leonid Gissen; Yevgeny Samsonov; Vladimir Kryukov; Igor Polyakov	Australia; Bob Tinning; Ernest Chapman; Nimrod Greenwood; David Anderson; Geoff Williamson; Mervyn Finlay; Edward Pain; Phil Cayzer; Tom Chessell

== Sailing ==
=== Medal table ===
* Host nation (Finland)

Rank	Nation	Gold	Silver	Bronze	Total
1	United States	2	1	0	3
2	Norway	1	2	0	3
3	Denmark	1	0	0	1
3	Italy	1	0	0	1
5	Sweden	0	1	2	3
6	Great Britain	0	1	0	1
7	Finland*	0	0	1	1
7	Germany	0	0	1	1
7	Portugal	0	0	1	1
Totals (9 entries)		5	5	5	15

=== Medalists ===
Event	Gold	Silver	Bronze
Finn	Paul Elvstrøm; Denmark	Charles Currey; Great Britain	Rickard Sarby; Sweden
Star	Italy; Agostino Straulino; Nicolò Rode	United States; John Price; John Reid	Portugal; Joaquim Fiúza; Francisco de Andrade
Dragon	Norway; Thor Thorvaldsen; Haakon Barfod; Sigve Lie	Sweden; Per Gedda; Erland Almqvist; Sidney Boldt-Christmas	Germany; Theodor Thomsen; Erich Natusch; Georg Nowka
5.5 metre	United States; Britton Chance; Michael Schoettle; Edgar White; Sumner White	Norway; Peder Lunde; Vibeke Lunde; Børre Falkum-Hansen	Sweden; Folke Wassén; Carl-Erik Ohlson; Magnus Wassén
6 metre	United States; Herman Whiton; Everard Endt; John Morgan; Eric Ridder; Julian Roosevelt; Emelyn Whiton	Norway; Finn Ferner; Tor Arneberg; Johan Ferner; Erik Heiberg; Carl Mortensen	Finland; Ernst Westerlund; Ragnar Jansson; Jonas Konto; Rolf Turkka; Paul Sjöberg

== Shooting ==
=== Medal table ===
* Host nation (Finland)

Rank	Nation	Gold	Silver	Bronze	Total
1	Norway	2	0	0	2
2	Soviet Union	1	1	2	4
3	Hungary	1	1	1	3
4	Romania	1	0	1	2
4	United States	1	0	1	2
6	Canada	1	0	0	1
7	Sweden	0	2	1	3
8	Finland*	0	1	1	2
9	Spain	0	1	0	1
9	Switzerland	0	1	0	1
Totals (10 entries)		7	7	7	21

=== Medalists ===
Event	Gold	Silver	Bronze
50 m pistol	Huelet Benner; United States	Angel Leon de Gozalo; Spain	Ambrus Balogh; Hungary
25 m rapid fire pistol	Károly Takács; Hungary	Szilárd Kun; Hungary	Gheorghe Lichiardopol; Romania
50 m rifle prone	Iosif Sîrbu; Romania	Boris Andreyev; Soviet Union	Arthur Jackson; United States
50 m rifle three positions	Erling Asbjørn Kongshaug; Norway	Vilho Ylönen; Finland	Boris Andreyev; Soviet Union
300 m free rifle three positions	Anatoli Bogdanov; Soviet Union	Robert Bürchler; Switzerland	Lev Weinstein; Soviet Union
100 m running deer	John Larsen; Norway	Per Olof Sköldberg; Sweden	Tauno Mäki; Finland
Trap	George Genereux; Canada	Knut Holmqvist; Sweden	Hans Liljedahl; Sweden

== Swimming ==
=== Medal table ===
Rank	Nation	Gold	Silver	Bronze	Total
1	United States	4	2	3	9
2	Hungary	4	2	1	7
3	France	1	1	1	3
4	Australia	1	0	0	1
4	South Africa	1	0	0	1
6	Japan	0	3	0	3
6	Netherlands	0	3	0	3
8	Sweden	0	0	2	2
9	Brazil	0	0	1	1
9	Germany	0	0	1	1
9	Great Britain	0	0	1	1
9	New Zealand	0	0	1	1
Totals (12 entries)		11	11	11	33

=== Men's events ===
Games	Gold		Silver		Bronze	
100 m freestyle	Clarke Scholes; United States	57.4	Hiroshi Suzuki; Japan	57.4	Göran Larsson; Sweden	58.2
400 m freestyle	Jean Boiteux; France	4:30.7 (OR)	Ford Konno; United States	4:31.3	Per-Olof Östrand; Sweden	4:35.2
1500 m freestyle	Ford Konno; United States	18:30.3 (OR)	Shiro Hashizume; Japan	18:41.4	Tetsuo Okamoto; Brazil	18:51.3
100 m backstroke	Yoshi Oyakawa; United States	1:05.4 (OR)	Gilbert Bozon; France	1:06.2	Jack Taylor; United States	1:06.4
200 m breaststroke	John Davies; Australia	2:34.4 (OR)	Bowen Stassforth; United States	2:34.7	Herbert Klein; Germany	2:35.9
4 × 200 m freestyle relay	United States; Wayne Moore; Bill Woolsey; Ford Konno; Jimmy McLane	8:31.1 (OR)	Japan; Hiroshi Suzuki; Yoshihiro Hamaguchi; Toru Goto; Teijiro Tanikawa	8:33.5	France; Joseph Bernardo; Aldo Eminente; Alexandre Jany; Jean Boiteux	8:45.9

=== Women's events ===
Games	Gold		Silver		Bronze	
100 m freestyle	Katalin Szöke; Hungary	1:06.8	Hannie Termeulen; Netherlands	1:07.0	Judit Temes; Hungary	1:07.1
400 m freestyle	Valéria Gyenge; Hungary	5:12.1 (OR)	Éva Novák; Hungary	5:13.7	Evelyn Kawamoto; United States	5:14.6
100 m backstroke	Joan Harrison; South Africa	1:14.3	Geertje Wielema; Netherlands	1:14.5	Jean Stewart; New Zealand	1:15.8
200 m breaststroke	Éva Székely; Hungary	2:51.7 (OR)	Éva Novák; Hungary	2:54.4	Helen Gordon; Great Britain	2:57.6
4 × 100 m freestyle relay	Hungary; Ilona Novák; Judit Temes; Éva Novák; Katalin Szöke	4:24.4 (WR)	Netherlands; Marie-Louise Linssen-Vaessen; Koosje van Voorn; Hannie Termeulen; Irma Heijting-Schuhmacher	4:29.0	United States; Jackie LaVine; Marilee Stepan; Jody Alderson; Evelyn Kawamoto	4:30.1

== Water polo ==
=== Medal table ===
Rank	Nation	Gold	Silver	Bronze	Total
1	Hungary	1	0	0	1
2	Yugoslavia	0	1	0	1
3	Italy	0	0	1	1
Totals (3 entries)		1	1	1	3

=== Medalists ===
Event	Gold	Silver	Bronze
Men's	Hungary; Róbert Antal; Antal Bolvári; Dezső Fábián; Dezső Gyarmati; István Hasznos; László Jeney; György Kárpáti; Dezső Lemhényi; Kálmán Markovits; Miklós Martin; Károly Szittya; István Szivós; György Vizvári	Yugoslavia; Veljko Bakašun; Marko Brainović; Vladimir Ivković; Zdravko Ježić; Zdravko-Ćiro Kovačić; Ivo Kurtini; Lovro Radonjić; Ivo Štakula; Boško Vuksanović	Italy; Gildo Arena; Lucio Ceccarini; Renato De Sanzuane; Raffaello Gambino; Salvatore Gionta; Maurizio Mannelli; Geminio Ognio; Carlo Peretti; Enzo Polito; Cesare Rubini; Renato Traiola

== Weightlifting ==
=== Medal table ===
Rank	Nation	Gold	Silver	Bronze	Total
1	United States	4	2	0	6
2	Soviet Union	3	3	1	7
3	Iran	0	1	1	2
4	Canada	0	1	0	1
5	Trinidad and Tobago	0	0	2	2
6	Argentina	0	0	1	1
6	Australia	0	0	1	1
6	South Korea	0	0	1	1
Totals (8 entries)		7	7	7	21

=== Medalists ===
Games	Gold	Silver	Bronze
56 kg	Ivan Udodov; Soviet Union	Mahmoud Namjoo; Iran	Ali Mirzaei; Iran
60 kg	Rafael Chimishkyan; Soviet Union	Nikolai Saksonov; Soviet Union	Rodney Wilkes; Trinidad and Tobago
67.5 kg	Tommy Kono; United States	Yevgeni Lopatin; Soviet Union	Vern Barberis; Australia
75 kg	Pete George; United States	Gérald Gratton; Canada	Kim Sung-Jip; South Korea
82.5 kg	Trofim Lomakin; Soviet Union	Stanley Stanczyk; United States	Arkady Vorobyev; Soviet Union
90 kg	Norbert Schemansky; United States	Grigory Novak; Soviet Union	Lennox Kilgour; Trinidad and Tobago
+90 kg	John Davis; United States	James Bradford; United States	Humberto Selvetti; Argentina

== Wrestling ==
=== Medal table ===
* Host nation (Finland)

Rank	Nation	Gold	Silver	Bronze	Total
1	Soviet Union	6	2	2	10
2	Sweden	3	4	1	8
3	Hungary	2	1	1	4
4	Turkey	2	0	1	3
5	United States	1	2	1	4
6	Finland*	1	1	2	4
7	Japan	1	1	0	2
8	Iran	0	2	3	5
9	Czechoslovakia	0	1	1	2
9	Lebanon	0	1	1	2
11	Italy	0	1	0	1
12	Egypt	0	0	1	1
12	Great Britain	0	0	1	1
12	India	0	0	1	1
Totals (14 entries)		16	16	16	48

=== Freestyle ===
Games	Gold	Silver	Bronze
Flyweight	Hasan Gemici; Turkey	Yushu Kitano; Japan	Mahmoud Mollaghasemi; Iran
Bantamweight	Shohachi Ishii; Japan	Rashid Mammadbeyov; Soviet Union	Khashaba Dadasaheb Jadhav; India
Featherweight	Bayram Sit; Turkey	Nasser Givehchi; Iran	Josiah Henson; United States
Lightweight	Olle Anderberg; Sweden	Jay Thomas Evans; United States	Tofigh Jahanbakht; Iran
Welterweight	William Smith; United States	Per Berlin; Sweden	Abdollah Mojtabavi; Iran
Middleweight	David Tsimakuridze; Soviet Union	Gholamreza Takhti; Iran	György Gurics; Hungary
Light heavyweight	Viking Palm; Sweden	Henry Wittenberg; United States	Adil Atan; Turkey
Heavyweight	Arsen Mekokishvili; Soviet Union	Bertil Antonsson; Sweden	Kenneth Richmond; Great Britain

=== Greco-Roman ===
Games	Gold	Silver	Bronze
Flyweight	Boris Gurevich; Soviet Union	Ignazio Fabra; Italy	Leo Honkala; Finland
Bantamweight	Imre Hódos; Hungary	Zakaria Chibab; Lebanon	Artem Teryan; Soviet Union
Featherweight	Yakov Punkin; Soviet Union	Imre Polyák; Hungary	Abdel Aaal Rashed; Egypt
Lightweight	Shazam Safin; Soviet Union	Gustav Freij; Sweden	Mikuláš Athanasov; Czechoslovakia
Welterweight	Miklós Szilvásy; Hungary	Gösta Andersson; Sweden	Khalil Taha; Lebanon
Middleweight	Axel Grönberg; Sweden	Kalervo Rauhala; Finland	Nikolay Belov; Soviet Union
Light heavyweight	Kelpo Gröndahl; Finland	Shalva Chikhladze; Soviet Union	Karl-Erik Nilsson; Sweden
Heavyweight	Johannes Kotkas; Soviet Union	Josef Růžička; Czechoslovakia	Tauno Kovanen; Finland
