= Pakistan national field hockey team results (1948–1959) =

These are all the international matches played by Pakistan national field hockey team from 1948 to 1959.

== Results ==
=== 1948 ===
1948 Summer Olympics

2 August 1948
Pool match

Pakistan	2 - 1	Belgium
Dara 38'; Masood 52'	Report	Delaval 10'

London, England

Stadium: Lyon Sports Ground

3 August 1948
Pool match

Pakistan	9 - 0	Denmark
Aziz 5', 8', 13', 24', 39', 46', 53', 65'; Dara 67'	Report

London, England

Stadium: Lyon Sports Ground

5 August 1948
Pool match

France	1 - 3	Pakistan
Lacroix 23'	Report	Aziz 33'; Dara 38', 53'

London, England

Stadium: Lyon Sports Ground

7 August 1948
Pool match

Pakistan	6 - 1	Netherlands
Dara 8', 28', 47', 59'; Hamid 3'; Razzaq 61'	Report	Kruize 53'

London, England

Stadium: Lyon Sports Ground

9 August 1948
Semifinal

Great Britain	2 - 0	Pakistan
White 55'; Adlard 60'	Report

London, England

Stadium: Wembley Stadium

12 August 1948
Third and fourth place

Netherlands	1 - 1 (a.e.t.)	Pakistan
Kruize 37'	Report	Hamid 12'

London, England

Stadium: Wembley Stadium

13 August 1948
Replay

Netherlands	4 - 1	Pakistan
Boerstra 32'; Bromberg 38'; Kruize 47'; Esser 56'	Report	Masood 31'

London, England

Stadium: Wembley Stadium

26 August 1948
Test match

Netherlands	0 - 0	Pakistan
	Report

The Hague, Netherlands

Stadium: Houtrastterein

Test series

29 August 1948
Match 1

Belgium	0 - 8	Pakistan
	Report	Aziz 11', 46', 50', 52'; Hamid 14', 41'; Mahmood 34'; Ghafoor 44'

Brussels, Belgium

Stadium:

30 August 1948
Match 2

Belgium	5 - 5	Pakistan
	Report

Ghent, Belgium

Stadium:

12 September 1948
Test match

Italy	0 - 2	Pakistan
	Report	Dara 29'; Aziz 50'

Merano, Italy

Stadium:

=== 1950 ===
Barcelona International Hockey Festival

1 November 1950
Quarterfinal

Pakistan	3 - 0	Switzerland
	Report

Barcelona, Spain

Stadium:

2 November 1950
Semifinal

Spain	1 - 3	Pakistan
	Report

Barcelona, Spain

Stadium:

4 November 1950
Final

Netherlands	1 - 1	Pakistan
Ancion 43'	Report	Aziz 13'

Barcelona, Spain

Stadium:

13 November 1950
Test match

France	3 - 7	Pakistan
	Report

Lyon, France

Stadium:

18 November 1950
Test match

Netherlands	1 - 2	Pakistan
Rinkel 37'	Report	Aziz 20'; Hamid 53'

Amsterdam, Netherlands

Stadium: Olympic Stadium

19 November 1950
Test match

Belgium	0 - 4	Pakistan
	Report	Aziz 17', 68'; Latif 34'; Asghar 36'

Brussels, Belgium

Stadium:

=== 1952 ===
1952 Summer Olympics

18 July 1952
Quarterfinal

Pakistan	6 - 0	France
Malik 14', 38'; Hamid 40', 41', 63'; Mir 68'	Report

Helsinki, Finland

Stadium: Helsinki Velodrome

20 July 1952
Semifinal

Netherlands	1 - 0	Pakistan
Wery 13'	Report

Helsinki, Finland

Stadium: Helsinki Velodrome

22 July 1952
Third and fourth place

Great Britain	2 - 1	Pakistan
Conroy 17', 44'	Report	Aziz 68'

Helsinki, Finland

Stadium: Helsinki Velodrome

6 August 1952
Test match

Netherlands	3 - 2	Pakistan
van Heel 17'; Boersta 30'; Kruize 39'	Report	Hamid 8'; Aziz 56'

Amsterdam, Netherlands

Stadium: Olympic Stadium

17 August 1952
Test match

West Germany	1 - 6	Pakistan
	Report

Berlin, West Germany

Stadium:

=== 1954 ===
Test series

13 December 1954
Match 1

Pakistan	6 - 3	West Germany
	Report

Bahawalpur, Pakistan

Stadium: Bahawal Stadium

21 December 1954
Match 2

Pakistan	3 - 1	West Germany
	Report

Peshawar, Pakistan

Stadium:

26 December 1954
Match 3

Pakistan	5 - 0	West Germany
	Report

Lahore, Pakistan

Stadium:

=== 1955 ===
5 January 1955
Match 4

Pakistan	2 - 2	West Germany
	Report

Karachi, Pakistan

Stadium:

Test series

20 February 1955
Match 1

Malaya	0 - 5	Pakistan
	Report

Ipoh, Malaysia

Stadium: Assembly Hall Ground

26 February 1955
Match 2

Singapore	1 - 11	Pakistan
Coutts 54'	Report	Aziz 12', 56', 64'; Naseer 24', 67'; Habib 27', 29', 46', 50', 59'; Latif 38'

Kallang, Singapore

Stadium: Jalan Besar Stadium

1 March 1955
Match 3

Singapore	2 - 6	Pakistan
Kuan 34'; Hon Yam 65'	Report	Habib 15'; Naseer 17', 25', 49'; Aziz 21'; Atif 59'

Kallang, Singapore

Stadium: Jalan Besar Stadium

12 March 1955
Match 4

Malaya	0 - 4	Pakistan
	Report	Habib 23'; Aziz 28', 65'; Naseer 41'

Seremban, Malaysia

Stadium: Station Padang

=== 1956 ===
1956 Summer Olympics

23 November 1956
Pool match

Pakistan	2 - 0	Belgium
Hamid 14'; Naseer 58'	Report

Melbourne, Australia

Stadium: Olympic Park Stadium

27 November 1956
Pool match

Pakistan	5 - 1	New Zealand
Hamid 2', 9'; Habib 38'; Naseer 41'; Motiullah 56'	Report	Johansson 59'

Melbourne, Australia

Stadium: Olympic Park Stadium

29 November 1956
Pool match

United Team of Germany	0 - 0	Pakistan
	Report

Melbourne, Australia

Stadium: Olympic Park Stadium

3 December 1956
Semifinal

Pakistan	3 - 2	Great Britain
Atif 5'; Habib 21'; Naseer 34'	Report	Doughty 10'; Conroy 56'

Melbourne, Australia

Stadium: Melbourne Cricket Ground

6 December 1956
Final

India	1 - 0	Pakistan
Gentle 38'	Report

Melbourne, Australia

Stadium: Melbourne Cricket Ground

9 December 1956
Test match

Australia	3 - 5	Pakistan
	Report

Sydney, Australia

Stadium: Sydney Sports Ground

Test series

30 December 1956
Match 1

Singapore	0 - 11	Pakistan
	Report	Hamid 3', 16', 19', 30', 60', 62'; Naseer 15', 18'; Zafar 39', 52'; Alam 57'

Kallang, Singapore

Stadium: Jalan Besar Stadium

1 January 1957
Match 2

Singapore	3 - 9	Pakistan
Vijiaratnam 8', 41'; Rozario 64'	Report	Zafar 12', 25', 39', 43'; Latif 15'; Naseer 34'; Habib 49', 57', 70'

Kallang, Singapore

Stadium: Jalan Besar Stadium

=== 1958 ===
1958 Asian Games

26 May 1958
Match 1

Pakistan	5 - 0	Japan
	Report

Tokyo, Japan

Stadium: National Stadium

27 May 1958
Match 2

Pakistan	8 - 0	South Korea
Dar 3', 14', 27', 45', 53'; Manna 31'; Naseer 34'; Hamid 64'	Report

Tokyo, Japan

Stadium: National Stadium

28 May 1958
Match 3

Pakistan	6 - 0	Malaya
	Report

Tokyo, Japan

Stadium: National Stadium

30 May 1958
Match 4

India	0 - 0	Pakistan
	Report

Tokyo, Japan

Stadium: National Stadium

Test series

9 June 1958
Match 1

Singapore	0 - 5	Pakistan
	Report

Kallang, Singapore

Stadium: Jalan Besar Stadium

10 June 1958
Match 2

Malaya	0 - 4	Pakistan
	Report	Manna 15', 57'; Zakauddin 17'; Alam 69'

Kuala Lumpur, Malaysia

Stadium: Stadium Merdeka

11 June 1958
Match 3

Malaya	0 - 2	Pakistan
	Report	Habib 22', 31'

Kallang, Singapore

Stadium: Jalan Besar Stadium

== Records and statistics ==
Won more matches than lost
Won equal matches to lost
Lost more matches than won

- Win Draw Loss

=== Head-to-head record ===
Opponent	GP	W	D	L	GF	GA
Netherlands	8	2	3	3	13	12
Malaya	5	5	0	0	21	0
Singapore	5	5	0	0	42	6
Belgium	5	4	1	0	21	6
West Germany	5	4	1	0	22	7
Great Britain	3	1	0	2	4	6
France	3	3	0	0	16	4
India	2	0	1	1	0	1
South Korea	1	1	0	0	8	0
Japan	1	1	0	0	5	0
Australia	1	1	0	0	5	3
United Team of Germany	1	0	1	0	0	0
New Zealand	1	1	0	0	5	1
Spain	1	1	0	0	3	1
Switzerland	1	1	0	0	3	0
Italy	1	1	0	0	2	0
Denmark	1	1	0	0	9	0

=== Competitive record ===
Year	Event	Round	Position	GP	W	D	L	GF	GA
(United Kingdom) 1948	OLY	Semifinals	4th	7	4	1	2	25	7
(Spain) 1950	INT	Champions	1st	3	2	1	0	7	2
(Finland) 1952	OLY	Semifinals	4th	3	1	0	2	7	3
(Australia) 1956	OLY	Runner-up	2nd	5	3	1	1	10	4
(Japan) 1958	AG	Champions	1st	4	3	1	0	19	0
