= Field hockey at the 1952 Summer Olympics =

Field hockey at the Games of the XV Olympiad
- Venues: Helsinki Velodrome; Kauriala Field; Porvoo Central Field
- Dates: 15–25 July 1952
- Teams: 12

Medalists
1st place, gold medalist(s)		India
2nd place, silver medalist(s)		Netherlands
3rd place, bronze medalist(s)		Great Britain

The men's field hockey tournament at the 1952 Summer Olympics was the seventh edition of the field hockey event for men at the Summer Olympics.

== Medal summary ==
Gold	Silver	Bronze
India; K. D. Singh; Leslie Claudius; Meldric Daluz; Keshav Dutt; Chinadorai Deshmutu; Ranganathan Francis; Raghbir Lal; Govind Perumal; Muniswamy Rajgopal; Balbir Singh Sr. Randhir Singh Gentle; C. S. Dubey; Udham Singh; Dharam Singh; Grahanandan Singh; Chaman Singh Gurung; Jaswant Rai	Netherlands; Jules Ancion; André Boerstra; Harry Derckx; Han Drijver; Dick Esser; Roepie Kruize; Dick Loggere; Lau Mulder; Eddy Tiel; Wim van Heel; Leonard Wery	Great Britain; Denys Carnill (capt); John Cockett; John Conroy; Graham Dadds; Derek Day; Dennis Eagan; Robin Fletcher; William Lindsay-Smith; Roger Midgley; Richard Norris; Neil Nugent; Anthony Nunn; Anthony John Robinson; Peter Smith; John Paskin Taylor; Stephen Theobald

== Results ==
=== Bracket ===
Preliminary round
15 July
Austria	2
Switzerland	1
15 July
Belgium	6
Finland	0
16 July
Germany	7
Poland	2
16 July
France	5
Italy	0

Quarter-finals
17 July
India	4
Austria	0
17 July
Great Britain	1
Belgium	0
18 July
Netherlands	1
Germany	0
18 July
Pakistan	6
France	0

Semi-finals
20 July
India	3
Great Britain	1
20 July
Netherlands	1
Pakistan	0

Gold medal match
24 July
India	6
Netherlands	1
Bronze medal match
22 July
Great Britain	2
Pakistan	1

=== Preliminary round ===
15 July 1952
18:00

Austria	2–1	Switzerland
	OR p. 694

Umpires:
M.G. Cowlishaw (GBR)
Mario Zovato (ITA)

15 July 1952
19:30

Belgium	6–0	Finland
	OR p. 694

Umpires:
C.E. Newham (NGR)
Zafar Ali (PAK)

16 July 1952
18:00

Germany	7–2	Poland
	OR p. 694

Umpires:
A.L. Allen (GBR)
K.H. Ingledew (GBR)

16 July 1952
19:30

France	5–0	Italy
	OR p. 694

Umpires:
A. van der Heyden (BEL)
J.J. Kwist (NED)

=== Quarter-finals ===
17 July 1952
18:00

India	4–0	Austria
Lal 32'; Gentle 39'; KD Singh 55'; Singh Sr. 57'	Report

Umpires:
J.J. Kwist (NED)
S. Zelinsky (POL)

17 July 1952
19:30

Great Britain	1–0	Belgium
	OR p. 695

Umpires:
B.H.F. Isselmann (NED)
S.M. Ayub (PAK)

18 July 1952
18:00

Netherlands	1–0	Germany
	OR p. 695

Umpires:
C.E. Newham (NGR)
A. van der Heyden (BEL)

18 July 1952
19:30

Pakistan	6–0	France
	OR p. 695

Umpires:
A.L. Allen (GBR)
W. Klee (AUT)

=== Semi-finals ===
20 July 1952
18:00

India	3–1	Great Britain
Singh Sr. ?', ?', ?'	OR p. 695

Umpires:
A. van der Heyden (BEL)
J.J. Kwist (NED)

20 July 1952
19:30

Netherlands	1–0	Pakistan
	OR p. 695

Umpires:
A. van der Heyden (BEL)
J.J. Kwist (NED)

=== Bronze medal match ===
22 July 1952
19:00

(bronze) Great Britain	2–1	Pakistan
	OR p. 696

Umpires:
A. van der Heyden (BEL)
W. Klee (AUT)

=== Gold medal match ===
24 July 1952
17:00

(gold) India	6–1	Netherlands (silver)
Singh Sr. 14', 16', 34', 43', 65'; KD Singh 25'	Report	Esser 55'

Umpires:
A.L. Allen (GBR)
K.H. Ingledew (GBR)

=== Consolation round ===
There was also a consolation tournament played by the teams which were eliminated before the semi-finals. It is unknown if this part of the tournament was official and part of the Olympic Games because the official report did not cover these matches.

5th–12th place quarter-finals
Germany	7
Finland	0
Austria	2
Italy	0
Belgium	2 / 0
Poland (replay)	2 / 1
France	1
Switzerland	2

5th–8th place semi-finals
Germany	2
Austria	1
Poland	1
Switzerland	0

Fifth place
Germany	4
Poland	0

==== 5th–12th place quarter-finals ====
21 July 1952

Germany	7–0	Finland

21 July 1952

Austria	2–0	Italy

21 July 1952

Belgium	2–2	Poland

22 July 1952

Belgium	0–1	Poland

21 July 1952

France	1–3	Switzerland

==== 5th–8th place semi-finals ====
23 July 1952

Germany	2–1	Austria

23 July 1952

Poland	1–0	Switzerland

==== Fifth and sixth place ====
23 July 1952

Germany	4–0	Poland

== Participating nations ==
Each country was allowed to enter a team of 18 players and they all were eligible for participation. A total number of 191 players were entered, however only the 144 participants and six more players are known up to now. The official report for this Games also shows 144 competitors, but in the "Index of competitors" there are 147 players listed. The Austrian Hermann Knoll, the Belgian Jean-Jacques Moucq and the Polish Tadeusz Adamski did, according to the report itself, not compete in the main tournament. The Austrian player is not even shown as a competitor by the Austrian Olympic Committee database.

A total of 144(*) field hockey players from 12 nations competed at the Helsinki Games:

- Austria (11)
- Belgium (11)
- Finland (11)
- France (13)
- Germany (15)
- Great Britain (13)
- India (14)
- Italy (11)
- Netherlands (11)
- Pakistan (12)
- Poland (11)
- Switzerland (11)

(*) NOTE: There are only players counted, which participated in the main tournament in one game at least.

== Summary ==
There was also a consolation tournament played by the teams which were eliminated before the semi-finals. It is unknown if this part of the tournament was official and part of the Olympic Games because the official report did not show these matches in any kind. However, the teams are listed in order of the results of this consolation round.

Place	Nation
1	India
2	Netherlands
3	Great Britain
4	Pakistan Manzoor Hussain Atif; Jack Britto; Abdul Hamid; Mahmoodul Hassan; Asghar Ali Khan; Muhammad Niaz Khan; Habib Ali Kiddie; Malik Aziz; Latif Mir; Habibur Rehman; Latif-ur-Rehman; Qazi Abdul Waheed
5	Germany Günther Brennecke; Hugo Budinger; Hugo Dollheiser; Hans-Jürgen Dollheiser; Wilfried Grube; Friedrich Hidding; Alfred Lücker; Carl-Ludwig Peters; Werner Rosenbaum; Heinz Schmitz; Heinz Schütz; Rolf Stoltenberg; Wilhelm Suhren; Heino Thielemann; Günther Ullerich
6	Poland Antoni Adamski; Eugeniusz Czajka; Alfons Flinik; Henryk Flinik; Jan Flinik; Narcyz Maciaszczyk; Jan Małkowiak; Maksymilian Małkowiak; Ryszard Marzec; Bronisław Pawlicki; Zdzisław Wojdylak Tadeusz Adamski; Jerzy Siankiewicz; Zdzisław Starzyński
7	Austria Kurt Dvorak; Karl Holzapfel; Walter Kaitna; Alfred Knoll; Johann Koller; Josef Matz; Josef Pecanka; Robert Pecanka; Ernst Schala; Josef Schimmer; Franz Strachota Hermann Knoll
7	Switzerland Jean-Pierre Bolomey; Kurt Goldschmid; Jean Grüner; Rudolf Keller; Fridolin Kurmann; Kurt Müller; Gilbert Recordon; Jean-Pierre Roche; Fritz Stuhlinger; Hugo Vonlanthen; Roger Zanetti; Karl Hofstetter
9	Belgium Pierre Bousmanne; José Delaval; Jean Dubois; Jean Enderle; Roger Goossens; Harold Mechelynck; Roger Morlet; Paul Toussaint; Jean Van Leer; Lucien van Weydeveld; Jacques Vanderstappen Jacky Moucq; Léo Rooman
9	Finland Veijo-Lassi Holopainen; Erkki Heikkilä; Tauno Timoska; Reino Lindroos; Kaarlo Einiö; Toivo Salminen; Keijo Kuusela; Esko Silvennoinen; Esko Salminen; Risto Lamppu; Pentti Elo
11	France Bernard Boone; Roger Capelle; Jean-François Dubessay; Claude Hauet; Jean Hauet; Michel Lacroix; Robert Lucas; Diran Manoukian; Florio Martel; André Meyer; Philippe Reynaud; Jacques Thieffry; Jean Zizine; Jean Desmasures
11	Italy Amedeo Banci; Egidio Cosentino; Vittorio Stellin Castellani; Luigi Lanfranchi; Sergio Formenti; Umberto Micco; Piervittorio Pampuro; Gastone Puccioni; Primo Meozzi; Sergio Morra; Giorgio Ravalli; Piero Baglia-Bamberghi; Luigi Piacentini; Giampaolo Medda; Mario Marchiori
