= Adamski (surname) =

Adamski or Adamsky (feminine: Adamska, plural: Adamscy) is a Polish surname, it may refer to:

- Antoni Adamski (1932–2001), Polish field hockey player
- David Adamski, American entomologist
- Filip Adamski (born 1983), German rower
- George Adamski (1891–1965), Polish-American who claimed to have had contacts with Venusian extraterrestrials
- Herbert Adamski (1910–1941), German rower
- Ireneusz Adamski (born 1974), Polish football player and manager
- Jan Adamski (1943–2026), Polish chess player
- Jerzy Adamski (1937–2002), Polish boxer
- Kacper Adamski (born 1992), Polish handball player
- Kazimierz Adamski (born 1964), Polish sculptor
- M. Patricia Adamski, American legal scholar
- Marcin Adamski (born 1975), Polish footballer
- Mariusz Adamski (born 1974), Polish aerial photographer
- Philippe Adamski (born 1985), French orienteering competitor
- Piotr Adamski, Polish model
- Stanisław Adamski (1875–1967), Polish priest, and social and political activist
- Tadeusz Adamski (1922–2001), Polish field hockey player
- Tomasz Adamski (born 1963), Polish punk musician and poet
- Viktor Adamsky (1923–2005), Soviet physicist
- Wanda Adamska (1944–2024), Polish politician
- Wiesław Adamski (1947–2017), Polish sculptor
