= Salminen =

Salminen is a Finnish surname of Virtanen type derived from the word salmi meaning strait. You can see name statistics in the Finnish name service Notable people with the surname include:

- Arto Salminen (1959–2005), Finnish writer known for his social commentary
- Arvo Salminen (1896–1967), Finnish politician
- Eero Salminen (1933–1997), Finnish athlete
- Esko Salminen (born 1940), Finnish actor
- Esko Salminen (field hockey) (1920–1998), Finnish field hockey player
- Heidi Salminen (born 2003), Finnish athlete
- Ilmari Salminen (1902–1986), Finnish athlete, winner of the 10000 m at the 1936 Summer Olympics
- Juha Salminen (born 1976), Finnish enduro rider
- Krisse Salminen (born 1976), Finnish stand-up comedian and television talkshow hostess
- Markku Salminen (1946–2004), Finnish orienteering competitor
- Marko Salminen (born 1978), Finnish rally co-driver
- Matti Salminen (born 1945), Finnish bass and opera singer
- Matti Salminen (rower) (born 1947), Finnish rower
- Max Salminen (born 1988), Swedish competitive sailor
- Mikko Salminen (born 1959), Finnish fencer
- Paavo Salminen (1911–1989), Finnish footballer
- Patrik Niklas-Salminen (born 1997), Finnish tennis player
- Pekka Salminen (1937–2024), Finnish architect
- Pekka Salminen (ski jumper) (born 1981), Finnish ski jumper
- Roope Salminen (born 1989), Finnish TV personality, singer and actor
- Sakari Salminen (born 1988), Finnish ice hockey player
- Saku Salminen (born 1994), Finnish ice hockey player
- Sally Salminen (1906–1976), Finnish author from the Åland Islands
- Samu Salminen (born 2003), Finnish ice hockey player
- Senni Salminen (born 1996), Finnish triathlete
- Simo Salminen (1932–2015), Finnish comic-actor in movies and television
- Timo Salminen (born 1952), Finnish cinematographer best known for his work in Aki Kaurismäki's films
- Toivo Salminen (1923–1991), Finnish field hockey player
- Veikko Salminen (born 1945), Finnish modern pentathlete and fencer
- Ville Salminen (1908–1992), Finnish film actor, director, writer and producer
- Ville-Veikko Salminen (1937–2006), Finnish actor

== See also ==
- Salmi
