= Formenti =

Formenti is an Italian surname. Notable people with the surname include:

- Ernesto Formenti (1927–1989), Italian boxer
- Sergio Formenti (1928–2009), Italian field hockey player
- Silvia Formenti (fl. 2009), Italian-American oncologist
