= Suhren =

Suhren is a German surname. Notable people with the surname include:

- Fritz Suhren (1908–1950), German SS Nazi concentration camp commandant executed for war crimes
- Reinhard Suhren (1916–1984), German U-boat commander during World War II, brother of Gerd Suhren
- Wilhelm Suhren (born 1927), German former field hockey player
