= Morlet (disambiguation) =

Morlet is a commune in the Saône-et-Loire department in the region of Bourgogne in France

Morlet may also refer to:

- Giulia Morlet (born 2002), French tennis player
- Jean Morlet (1931–2007), French geophysicist who pioneered work in the field of wavelet analysis
  - Morlet wavelet, a wavelet composed of a complex exponential (carrier) and a Gaussian window (envelope)
- Marie-Thérèse Morlet (1913–2005), French specialist in onomastics, honorary CNRS director of research
- Roger Morlet (born 1930), Belgian field hockey player
