= Hockey at the 1952 Olympics =

Hockey at the 1952 Olympics may refer to:

- Ice hockey at the 1952 Winter Olympics
- Field hockey at the 1952 Summer Olympics
