= Ravalli =

Ravalli is a surname. Notable people with the surname include:

- Antonio Ravalli (1812–1884), Italian Jesuit missionary
- Giorgio Ravalli (1925–2001), Italian field hockey player
- Giovanni Ravalli (1909–1998), Italian military officer

== See also ==
- Ravalli, Montana, town in Lake County, Montana
- Ravalli County, Montana
