= Pawlicki =

Pawlicki (feminine Pawlicka, plural Pawliccy) is a Polish surname. It may refer to:

- Bronisław Pawlicki (1925–2014), Polish field hockey player
- Piotr Pawlicki Jr. (born 1994), Polish speedway rider
- Przemysław Pawlicki (born 1991), Polish speedway rider
- Stefan Pawlicki (1839–1916), Polish priest and historian
