= Asghar Ali Khan =

Asghar Ali Khan may refer to:

- Asghar Ali Khan (field hockey)
- Asghar Ali Khan (politician)
