= Rooman =

Rooman is a surname. Notable people with the surname include:

- Alban Rooman (fl. late 19th century), Belgian sport shooter and Olympian
- Léo Rooman (1928–2019), Belgian field hockey player and Olympian
