= Pampuro =

Pampuro is a surname. Notable people with the surname include:

- José Pampuro (1949–2021), Argentine politician
- Piervittorio Pampuro (1917–2007), Italian field hockey player
