= Kurt Müller (field hockey) =

Swiss hockey player (born 1928)

Personal information
- Nationality: Swiss
- Born: 9 February 1928

Sport
- Sport: Field hockey

Kurt Müller (born 9 February 1928) was a Swiss field hockey player. He competed in the men's tournament at the 1952 Summer Olympics.
