= Primo Meozzi =

Italian hockey player (1928–1971)

Personal information
- Nationality: Italian
- Born: 1 January 1928 Trieste, Italy
- Died: 28 January 1971 (aged 43)

Sport
- Sport: Field hockey

Primo Meozzi (1 January 1928 – 28 January 1971) was an Italian field hockey player. He competed in the men's tournament at the 1952 Summer Olympics.
