= Reino Lindroos =

Finnish field hockey player

Personal information
- Nationality: Finnish
- Born: 16 May 1918 Viipuri, Finland
- Died: 6 February 1976 (aged 57) Helsinki, Finland

Sport
- Sport: Field hockey

Reino Lindroos (16 May 1918 – 6 February 1976) was a Finnish field hockey player. He competed in the men's tournament at the 1952 Summer Olympics.
