= Vittorio Stellin Castellani =

Italian field hockey player (1928–1969)

Personal information
- Nationality: Italian
- Born: 8 September 1928 Padua, Italy
- Died: 1 March 1969 (aged 40)

Sport
- Sport: Field hockey

Vittorio Stellin Castellani (8 September 1928 – 1 March 1969) was an Italian field hockey player. He competed in the men's tournament at the 1952 Summer Olympics.
