= Jan Małkowiak =

Polish field hockey player

Jan Małkowiak (May 20, 1919 in Gelsenkirchen, Germany – July 26, 1991 in Gniezno) was a Polish field hockey player who competed in the 1952 Summer Olympics. He played as back in the only match for Poland in the main tournament as well as in one match in the consolation tournament.
