= Narcyz Maciaszczyk =

Polish field hockey player

Narcyz Maciaszczyk (born July 19, 1929, in Gniezno - December 22, 1985 in Poznań) was a Polish field hockey player who competed in the 1952 Summer Olympics and in the 1960 Summer Olympics.

He was part of the Polish field hockey team, which competed in the 1952 Olympic tournament. He played as halfback in the only match for Poland in the main tournament as well as in one match in the consolation tournament.

Eight years later in the 1960 Olympic tournament he played all four matches for Poland.
