= Esko Silvennoinen =

Finnish field hockey player (1931–2020)

Personal information
- Nationality: Finnish
- Born: 12 August 1931 Viipuri, Finland
- Died: 18 November 2020 (aged 89)

Sport
- Sport: Field hockey

Esko Silvennoinen (12 August 1931 – 18 November 2020) was a Finnish field hockey player. He competed in the men's tournament at the 1952 Summer Olympics.
