= Walter Kaitna =

Austrian hockey player

Personal information
- Nationality: Austrian
- Born: 4 November 1914 Vienna, Austria
- Died: October 1983

Sport
- Sport: Field hockey

Walter Kaitna (4 November 1914 – October 1983) was an Austrian field hockey player. He competed in the men's tournament at the 1952 Summer Olympics.
