= Hugo Vonlanthen =

Swiss field hockey player

Personal information
- Nationality: Swiss
- Born: 12 June 1930 Lausanne, Switzerland
- Died: 28 April 2009 (aged 78) Lausanne, Switzerland

Sport
- Sport: Field hockey

Hugo Vonlanthen (12 June 1930 – 28 April 2009) was a Swiss field hockey player. He competed in the men's tournament at the 1952 Summer Olympics.
