= Luigi Lanfranchi =

Italian hockey player (1914–1969)

Personal information
- Nationality: Italian
- Born: 14 January 1914 Genoa, Italy
- Died: 17 June 1969 (aged 55)

Sport
- Sport: Field hockey

Luigi Lanfranchi (14 January 1914 – 17 June 1969) was an Italian field hockey player. He competed in the men's tournament at the 1952 Summer Olympics.
