= Ruedi Keller =

Swiss ice hockey player (1925–2014)

- Born: 6 October 1925 Switzerland
- Died: 2014 (aged 88–89)
- Position: Defence
- National team: Switzerland
- Playing career: ?–?

Rudolf Keller (6 October 1925 – 2014) was a Swiss ice hockey player who competed for the Swiss national team at the 1956 Winter Olympics in Cortina d'Ampezzo. He also competed in the men's tournament at the 1952 Summer Olympics. Keller died in 2014.
