= Jacky Moucq =

Belgian field hockey player

Personal information
- Nationality: Belgian
- Born: 11 March 1922 Uccle, Belgium
- Died: 1 January 2008 (aged 85) Braine-l'Alleud, Belgium

Sport
- Sport: Field hockey

Jacky Moucq (11 March 1922 – 1 January 2008) was a Belgian field hockey player. He competed in the men's tournament at the 1952 Summer Olympics.
