= Josef Schimmer =

Austrian hockey player

Personal information
- Nationality: Austrian
- Born: 6 March 1923
- Died: 5 May 1979 (aged 56)

Sport
- Sport: Field hockey

Josef Schimmer (6 March 1923 – 5 May 1979) was an Austrian field hockey player. He competed in the men's tournament at the 1952 Summer Olympics.
