= Alfred Knoll =

Austrian field hockey player

Personal information
- Nationality: Austrian
- Born: 21 April 1928
- Died: 21 July 2002 (aged 74)

Sport
- Sport: Field hockey

Alfred Knoll (21 April 1928 – 21 July 2002) was an Austrian field hockey player. He competed in the men's tournament at the 1952 Summer Olympics.
