= Kaarlo Einiö =

Finnish hockey player

Personal information
- Nationality: Finnish
- Born: 4 December 1921 Helsinki, Finland
- Died: 22 November 1976 (aged 54) Espoo, Finland

Sport
- Sport: Field hockey

Kaarlo Einiö (4 December 1921 – 22 November 1976) was a Finnish field hockey player. He competed in the men's tournament at the 1952 Summer Olympics.
