= Piero Baglia-Bamberghi =

Italian hockey player (1928–1994)

Personal information
- Nationality: Italian
- Born: 12 March 1928 Milan, Italy
- Died: 30 October 1994 (aged 66) Milan, Italy

Sport
- Sport: Field hockey

Piero Baglia-Bamberghi (12 March 1928 – 30 October 1994) was an Italian field hockey player. He competed in the men's tournament at the 1952 Summer Olympics.

He died in his home town of Milan in 1994.
