= Josef Matz =

Austrian hockey player (1925–2005)

Personal information
- Nationality: Austrian
- Born: 8 December 1925
- Died: 7 March 2005 (aged 79)

Sport
- Sport: Field hockey

Josef Matz (8 December 1925 – 7 March 2005) was an Austrian field hockey player. He competed in the men's tournament at the 1952 Summer Olympics.
