= Kurt Dvorak =

Austrian hockey player

Personal information
- Nationality: Austrian
- Born: 3 June 1928
- Died: 23 May 2007 (aged 78)

Sport
- Sport: Field hockey

Kurt Dvorak (3 June 1928 – 23 May 2007) was an Austrian field hockey player. He competed in the men's tournament at the 1952 Summer Olympics.
