= Umberto Micco =

Italian hockey player (1916–1989)

Personal information
- Nationality: Italian
- Born: 24 March 1916 Boston, Massachusetts, United States
- Died: 16 December 1989 (aged 73)

Sport
- Sport: Field hockey

Umberto Micco (24 March 1916 – 16 December 1989) was an Italian field hockey player and politician. He competed in the men's tournament at the 1952 Summer Olympics. Micco became a city councilor in 1965, and later became the mayor of Moncalvo.
