= Henryk Flinik =

Polish field hockey player

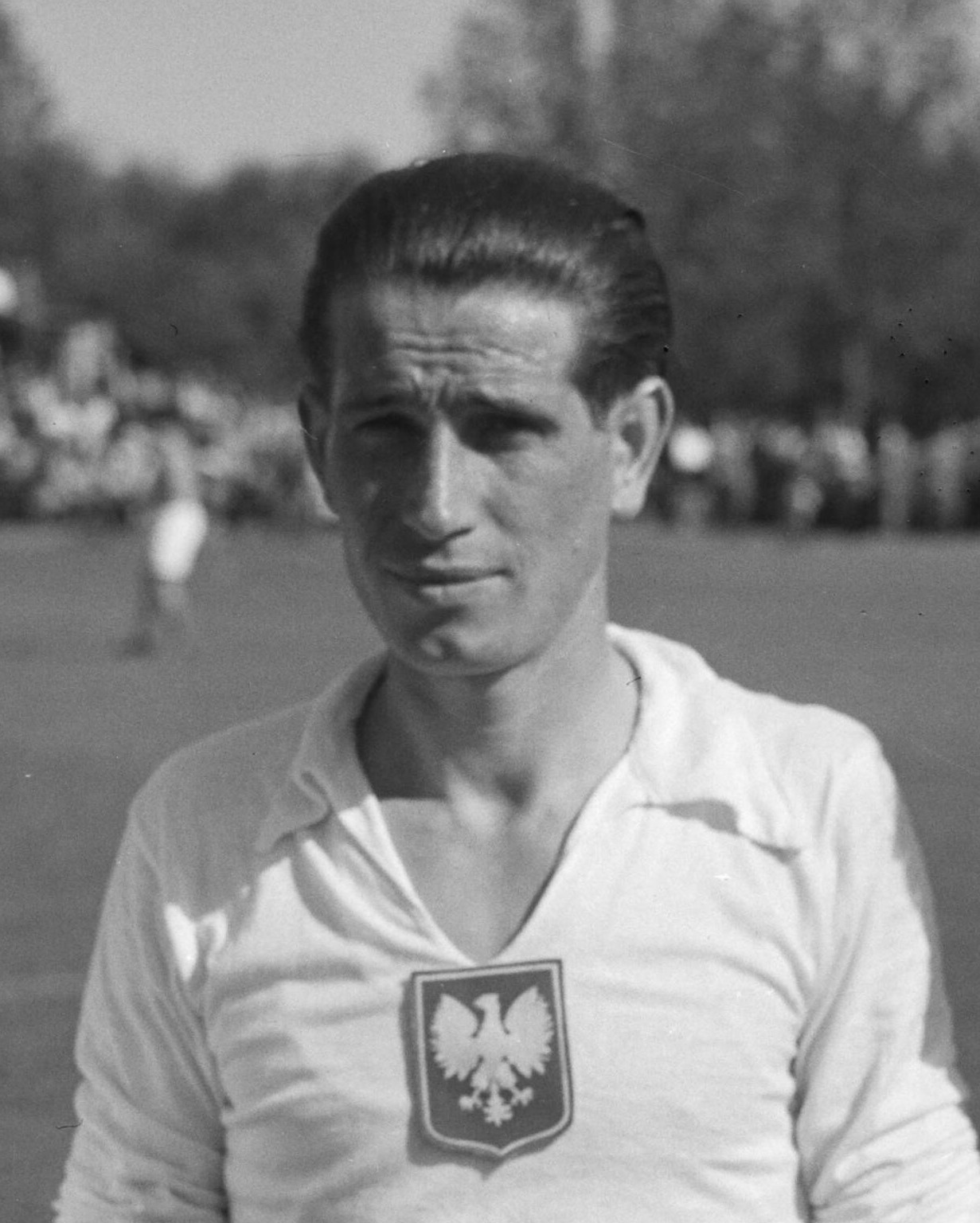
Flinik in 1956

Henryk Flinik (January 20, 1928 in Gniezno – September 20, 2008, Gniezno) was a Polish field hockey player who competed in the 1952 Summer Olympics and in the 1960 Summer Olympics. He was part of the Polish field hockey team, which competed in the 1952 Olympic tournament. He played as forward in the only match for Poland in the main tournament as well as in one match in the consolation tournament.

Eight years later in the 1960 Olympic tournament he played all four matches for Poland.
