= Luigi Piacentini =

Italian hockey player (born 1930)

Personal information
- Nationality: Italian
- Born: 23 July 1930 (age 96) Pisa, Italy

Sport
- Sport: Field hockey

Achievements and titles
- Olympic finals: 1952 Summer Olympics

Luigi Piacentini (born 23 July 1930) is an Italian field hockey player. He competed in the men's tournament at the 1952 Summer Olympics.
