= Jerzy Siankiewicz =

Polish field hockey player

Personal information
- Nationality: Polish
- Born: 17 October 1930 Poznań, Poland
- Died: 2 November 1984 (aged 54) Poznań, Poland

Sport
- Sport: Field hockey

Jerzy Siankiewicz (17 October 1930 – 2 November 1984) was a Polish field hockey player. He competed in the men's tournament at the 1952 Summer Olympics.
