= Florio Martel =

French field hockey player

Personal information
- Nationality: French
- Born: 2 March 1923 Lausanne, Switzerland
- Died: 11 August 1990 (aged 67) Villeurbanne, France

Sport
- Sport: Field hockey

Florio Gabriel Martel (2 March 1923 – 11 August 1990) was a French field hockey player. He competed in the men's tournament at the 1952 Summer Olympics.
