= Mario Marchiori =

Italian hockey player (1928–2010)

Personal information
- Nationality: Italian
- Born: 23 February 1928 Genoa, Italy
- Died: 4 October 2010 (aged 82)

Sport
- Sport: Field hockey

Mario Marchiori (23 February 1928 – 4 October 2010) was an Italian field hockey player. He competed in the men's tournament at the 1952 Summer Olympics.
