= Jean-Pierre Bolomey =

Swiss hockey player

Personal information
- Nationality: Swiss
- Born: 10 June 1926
- Died: 2 January 2007 (aged 80)

Sport
- Sport: Field hockey

Jean-Pierre Bolomey (10 June 1926 – 2 January 2007) was a Swiss field hockey player. He competed in the men's tournament at the 1952 Summer Olympics.
