= Peter Smith (field hockey) =

British field hockey player (1926-2022)

Personal information
- Born: 7 May 1926 Chelsea, London, England
- Died: 27 July 2022 (aged 96) Somerset, England

Sport
- Sport: Field hockey
- Position: Full back
Senior career
Years	Team	Caps	Goals
1944–1947	Oxford University	-	-
1950–1953	Hawks	-	-
1955–1957	City of Oxford	-	-
1958–1961	Kidderminster	-	-
National team
Years	Team	Caps	Goals
–	Great Britain		-
–	England		-
Medal record
Men's field hockey
Representing Great Britain
Bronze medal – third place	1952 Helsinki	Team competition

Peter David Rees Smith (7 May 1926 – 27 July 2022) was a British field hockey player who competed in the 1952 Summer Olympics. He was a member of the British field hockey team which won the bronze medal.

== Biography ==
Smith was educated at Canford School where he played rugby and studied at the University of Oxford. While at Oxford he played hockey for the University team.

He represented Surrey at county level and in March 1950 was selected for England trials. He subsequently played for England on 15 April against Ireland.

Smith was then selected for Great Britain for the 1951 tour of South Arrica After University, he played club hockey for Hawks HC in Byfleet.

He received a call up for the Olympics in May 1952 and subsequently represented Great Britain in the field hockey tournament at the 1952 Olympic Games in Helsinki, although he had to settle for being an unused substitute.

By 1955 he was playing for the City of Oxford Hockey Club and Oxfordshire. He played for Kidderminster and Worcestershire after moving to the area in 1958.

A fourth different county appearance ensued for Gloucestershire in 1963 and he captained England in 1965 and played until 1968.

Smith died in Somerset on 27 July 2022, at the age of 96.
