= Sergio Morra =

Italian hockey player (1929–2013)

Personal information
- Nationality: Italian
- Born: 1 April 1929 Genoa, Italy
- Died: 3 May 2013 (aged 84)

Sport
- Sport: Field hockey

Sergio Morra (1 April 1929 – 3 May 2013) was an Italian field hockey player. He competed in the men's tournament at the 1952 Summer Olympics.
