= Gastone Puccioni =

Italian field hockey player (1926–1984)

Personal information
- Nationality: Italian
- Born: 17 August 1926 Genoa, Italy
- Died: 19 December 1994 (aged 68)

Sport
- Sport: Field hockey

Gastone Puccioni (17 August 1926 – 19 December 1994) was an Italian field hockey player. He competed in the men's tournament at the 1952 Summer Olympics.
