= Egidio Cosentino =

Italian field hockey player (1927–2020)

Personal information
- Nationality: Italian
- Born: 21 April 1927 Trieste, Italy
- Died: 15 November 2020 (aged 93) Calgary, Alberta, Canada

Sport
- Sport: Field hockey

Egidio Cosentino (21 April 1927 – 15 November 2020) was an Italian field hockey player. He competed in the men's tournament at the 1952 Summer Olympics.

According to his obituary, he was born in Trieste, where he secured a university degree in Structural engineering in 1948. With his wife Luisa Querin, he emigrated to Canada in 1954, working for Strong, Lamb and Nelson from 1960, from 1977 running his own structural engineering company.
