= Fridolin Kurmann =

Swiss field hockey player

Fridolin Kurmann (born 12 December 1912; date of death unknown) was a Swiss field hockey player who competed in the 1936 Summer Olympics, in the 1948 Summer Olympics, and in the 1952 Summer Olympics. In 1936 he was a member of the Swiss team which was eliminated in the group stage of the Olympic tournament. He played all three matches as back. Twelve years later he was part of the Swiss team which was eliminated in the group stage of the 1948 Olympic tournament. He played all three matches as back. At the 1952 Olympic hockey tournament he played in the only match for Switzerland as back when they were eliminated against Austria in the first round.
