= Kurt Goldschmid =

Swiss hockey player

Personal information
- Nationality: Swiss
- Born: 4 August 1919
- Died: 31 December 1979 (aged 60)

Sport
- Sport: Field hockey

Kurt Goldschmid (4 August 1919 – 31 December 1979) was a Swiss field hockey player. He competed in the men's tournament at the 1952 Summer Olympics.
