= Paul Toussaint =

Belgian field hockey player

Personal information
- Nationality: Belgian
- Born: 27 November 1921 Ixelles, Belgium
- Died: February 2018 (aged 96)

Sport
- Sport: Field hockey

Paul Toussaint (27 November 1921 – February 2018) was a Belgian field hockey player. He competed in the men's tournament at the 1952 Summer Olympics.
