= Pierre Bousmanne =

Belgian field hockey player

Personal information
- Full name: Pierre Félicien Bousmanne
- Nationality: Belgian
- Born: 11 April 1925 Brussels, Belgium

Sport
- Sport: Field hockey

Pierre Bousmanne (born 11 April 1925) was a Belgian field hockey player. He competed in the men's tournament at the 1952 Summer Olympics.
