= Veijo-Lassi Holopainen =

Finnish hockey player (1921–2006)

Personal information
- Nationality: Finnish
- Born: 26 June 1921 Kuopio, Finland
- Died: 8 January 2006 (aged 84) Pori, Finland

Sport
- Sport: Field hockey

Veijo-Lassi Holopainen (26 June 1921 – 8 January 2006) was a Finnish field hockey player. He competed in the men's tournament at the 1952 Summer Olympics.
