= Pentti Elo =

Finnish hockey player

Personal information
- Nationality: Finnish
- Born: 10 June 1929 Hämeenlinna, Finland
- Died: 4 June 1991 (aged 61) Hämeenlinna, Finland

Sport
- Sport: Field hockey

Pentti Elo (10 June 1929 – 4 June 1991) was a Finnish field hockey player. He competed in the men's tournament at the 1952 Summer Olympics.
