= Roger Capelle =

French field hockey player

Personal information
- Nationality: French
- Born: 14 January 1922
- Died: 26 May 1968 (aged 46)

Sport
- Sport: Field hockey

Roger Capelle (14 January 1922 – 26 May 1968) was a French field hockey player. He competed in the men's tournament at the 1952 Summer Olympics.
