= Erkki Heikkilä =

Finnish field hockey player

Personal information
- Nationality: Finnish
- Born: 23 February 1924 Viipuri, Finland
- Died: 22 November 2000 (aged 76)

Sport
- Sport: Field hockey

Erkki Heikkilä (23 February 1924 – 22 November 2000) was a Finnish field hockey player. He competed in the men's tournament at the 1952 Summer Olympics.
