= Risto Lamppu =

Finnish field hockey player

Personal information
- Nationality: Finnish
- Born: 19 December 1924 Viipuri, Finland
- Died: 31 July 1995 (aged 70) Kontiolahti, Finland

Sport
- Sport: Field hockey

Risto Lamppu (19 December 1924 – 31 July 1995) was a Finnish field hockey player. He competed in the men's tournament at the 1952 Summer Olympics.
