= Amedeo Banci =

Italian field hockey player (1925–2013)

Personal information
- Nationality: Italian
- Born: 18 August 1925 Rome, Italy
- Died: 24 December 2013 (aged 88) Lerici, Italy

Sport
- Sport: Field hockey

Amedeo Banci (18 August 1925 – 24 December 2013) was an Italian field hockey player. He competed in the men's tournament at the 1952 Summer Olympics.
