= Jean Zizine =

French field hockey player

Personal information
- Nationality: French
- Born: 3 August 1922 Bordeaux, France
- Died: 12 July 1986 (aged 63) Boulogne-Billancourt, France

Sport
- Sport: Field hockey

Jean Alexandre Germain Zizine (3 August 1922 – 12 July 1986) was a French field hockey player. He competed in the men's tournament at the 1952 Summer Olympics.
