= Jean Grüner =

Swiss field hockey player

Hans Grüner (10 October 1916, death date unknown) was a Swiss field hockey player who competed in the 1936 Summer Olympics, in the 1948 Summer Olympics, and in the 1952 Summer Olympics. In 1936 he was a member of the Swiss team which was eliminated in the group stage of the Olympic tournament. He played one match as forward. Twelve years later he was part of the Swiss team which was eliminated in the group stage of the 1948 Olympic tournament. He played all three matches as halfback or forward. At the 1952 Olympic hockey tournament he played in the only match for Switzerland as forward when they were eliminated against Austria in the first round.
