= Maksymilian Małkowiak =

Polish field hockey player

Maksymilian Małkowiak (September 26, 1922 in Gniezno – September 6, 2009 in Gniezno) was a Polish field hockey player who competed in the 1952 Summer Olympics.

He was part of the Polish field hockey team, which competed in the 1952 Olympic tournament. He played as forward in the only match for Poland in the main tournament.
