= Robert Pecanka =

Austrian hockey player

Personal information
- Nationality: Austrian
- Born: 2 July 1930
- Died: 11 March 2013 (aged 82)

Sport
- Sport: Field hockey

Robert Pecanka (2 July 1930 – 11 March 2013) was an Austrian field hockey player. He competed in the men's tournament at the 1952 Summer Olympics.
