= Zdzisław Starzyński =

Polish field hockey player

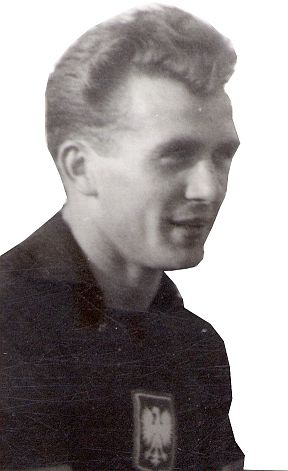
- Zdzisław Starzyński in 1955

Personal information
- Nationality: Polish
- Born: 25 May 1932 Poznań, Poland
- Died: 30 January 2003 (aged 70) Poznań, Poland

Sport
- Sport: Field hockey

Zdzisław Starzyński (25 May 1932 – 30 January 2003) was a Polish field hockey player. He competed in the men's tournament at the 1952 Summer Olympics.
