= Anthony Nunn =

British field hockey player (1927–2025)

Tony Nunn
Personal information
- Born: 24 May 1927 Shalford, Surrey, England
- Died: 7 May 2025 (aged 97)

Sport
- Sport: Field hockey
- Position: Forward
Senior career
Years	Team	Caps	Goals
1946–1962	Hawks	-	-
National team
Years	Team	Caps	Goals
–	Great Britain	5	-
–	England		-
Medal record
Men's field hockey
Representing Great Britain
Bronze medal – third place	1952 Helsinki	Team competition

Anthony Stuart Nunn OBE (24 May 1927 – 7 May 2025) was a British field hockey player who competed in the 1952 Summer Olympics.

== Biography ==
Nunn was educated at Haileybury School. He completed his national service with the Royal Navy and played for the Portsmouth United Services team at the time.

Nunn played club hockey for Hawks Hockey Club of Byfleet, Surrey, and represented Surrey at county level, the Hockey Association and The South.

Nunn represented Great Britain in the field hockey tournament at the 1952 Olympic Games in Helsinki, where he won the bronze medal. Nunn played all three matches as forward.

Although having competed in an Olympics for Great Britain he did not make his England debut until 1954 against Wales at Reading.

After retiring from playing he became an amrine insurance underwriter in London before becoming Chairman of the International Union of Marine Insurers.

He died on 7 May 2025, at the age of 97.
