= Friedrich Hidding =

German field hockey player (1926–2011)

Friedrich Wilhelm Hidding (6 November 1926 – 2 August 2011) was a German field hockey player who competed in the 1952 Summer Olympics. He was born in Hamm.
