= John Cockett =

English field hockey player and cricketer (1927–2020)

Personal information
- Born: 23 December 1927 Broadstairs, Kent, England
- Died: 16 February 2020 (aged 92) Norfolk, England

Sport
- Sport: Field hockey
- Position: Half-back
Senior career
Years	Team	Caps	Goals
1951–1953	Cambridge University	-	-
1952–1952	Chelmsford	-	-
1954–1955	Edgbaston	-	-
1955–1958	Cambridge University Wanderers	-	-
National team
Years	Team	Caps	Goals
–	Great Britain		-
–	England		-
Medal record
Representing Great Britain
Olympic Games
Bronze medal – third place	1952 Helsinki	Team competition

John Cockett
Cricket information
- Batting: Right-handed
- Role: Batsman

Domestic team information
- Years: Team
- 1951–1953: Cambridge University

Career statistics
Competition	First-class
Matches	8
Runs scored	311
Batting average	23.92
100s/50s	1/2
Top score	121
Catches/stumpings	3/–
- Source: CricketArchive, 16 November 2022

John Ashley Cockett (23 December 1927 – 16 February 2020) was an English sportsman who was an Olympic bronze medal-winning field hockey player for England and Great Britain and appeared at two Olympic Games. He also played first-class and minor counties cricket.

== Biography ==
Cockett was born in Broadstairs. He attended Cambridge University and won his Blues at both cricket and hockey. As a cricketer he was a middle-order batsman while his hockey was played as a half-back. He made seven first-class appearances for Cambridge University in 1951 and made a century against Sussex in Worthing to help set up a 137 run win. From 1949 to 1962, Cockett regularly played in the Minor Counties Cricket Championship for Buckinghamshire.

At the 1952 Summer Olympics in Helsinki, Cockett was a member of the Great Britain hockey team, which won the bronze medal by defeating Pakistan 2–1. He played his club hockey with Chelmsford Hockey Club. He narrowly missed out on another medal in the 1956 Melbourne Olympics when his side finished fourth after losing 3–1 to Germany.

Cockett's only other first-class match was in 1953, when he played with the Minor Counties cricket team against the touring Australians which included Alan Davidson, Ray Lindwall, Bill Johnston and Richie Benaud. Cockett scored no runs in either innings.

On leaving Cambridge Cockett became a master at Felsted School, where he taught mathematics and coached cricket and hockey. He retired from teaching in 1989.
