= Anthony John Robinson =

British field hockey player

Anthony Robinson
Personal information
- Born: 22 July 1925 Nuwara Eliya, Central Province, Ceylon
- Died: 24 July 1982 (aged 57) Long Sutton, England

Sport
- Sport: Field hockey
Senior career
| Years | Team | Caps | Goals |
| 1949–1951 | Worcester | - | - |
| 1952–1952 | Taunton Vale | - | - |
| 1951–1961 | West Of England Wanderers | - | - |
National team
| Years | Team | Caps | Goals |
| – | Great Britain | | - |
| – | England | | - |
Medal record
Men's field hockey
Representing Great Britain
| Bronze medal – third place | 1952 Helsinki | Team competition |

Anthony John Backhouse Robinson (born 22 July 1925 – 24 July 1982) was a field hockey player who competed in the 1952 Summer Olympics and 1956 Summer Olympics.

== Biography ==
Robinson was educated at Marlborough School and came from a hockey family, with his two uncles Lawrence Robinson and John Yate Robinson both playing hockey.

Robinson joined the Royal Navy and in 1947 gained his first county hockey cap for Leicestershire before switching to Worcestershire and then Somerset (the latter whom he captained). He played club hockey for Worcester Hockey Club and then West Of England Wanderers.

He made his England debut against Wales at Bournemouth in 1950. He subsequently represented Great Britain in the field hockey tournament at the 1952 Olympic Games in Helsinki and won the bronze medal.

In 1954 he captained Great Britain in an international tournament in Belgium and two years later he represented the Great Britain team again in the field hockey tournament at the 1956 Olympic Games in Melbourne. He was vice-captain of a England team that toured South Africa and Kenya in 1958.

Later he taught at Millfield school.
