= Piervittorio Pampuro =

Italian hockey player (1917–2007)

Personal information
- Nationality: Italian
- Born: 22 April 1917 Terni, Italy
- Died: 6 August 2007 (aged 90) Johannesburg, South Africa

Sport
- Sport: Field hockey

Piervittorio Pampuro (22 April 1917 – 6 August 2007) was an Italian field hockey player. He competed in the men's tournament at the 1952 Summer Olympics.
