= Han Drijver =

Dutch field hockey player (1927–1986)

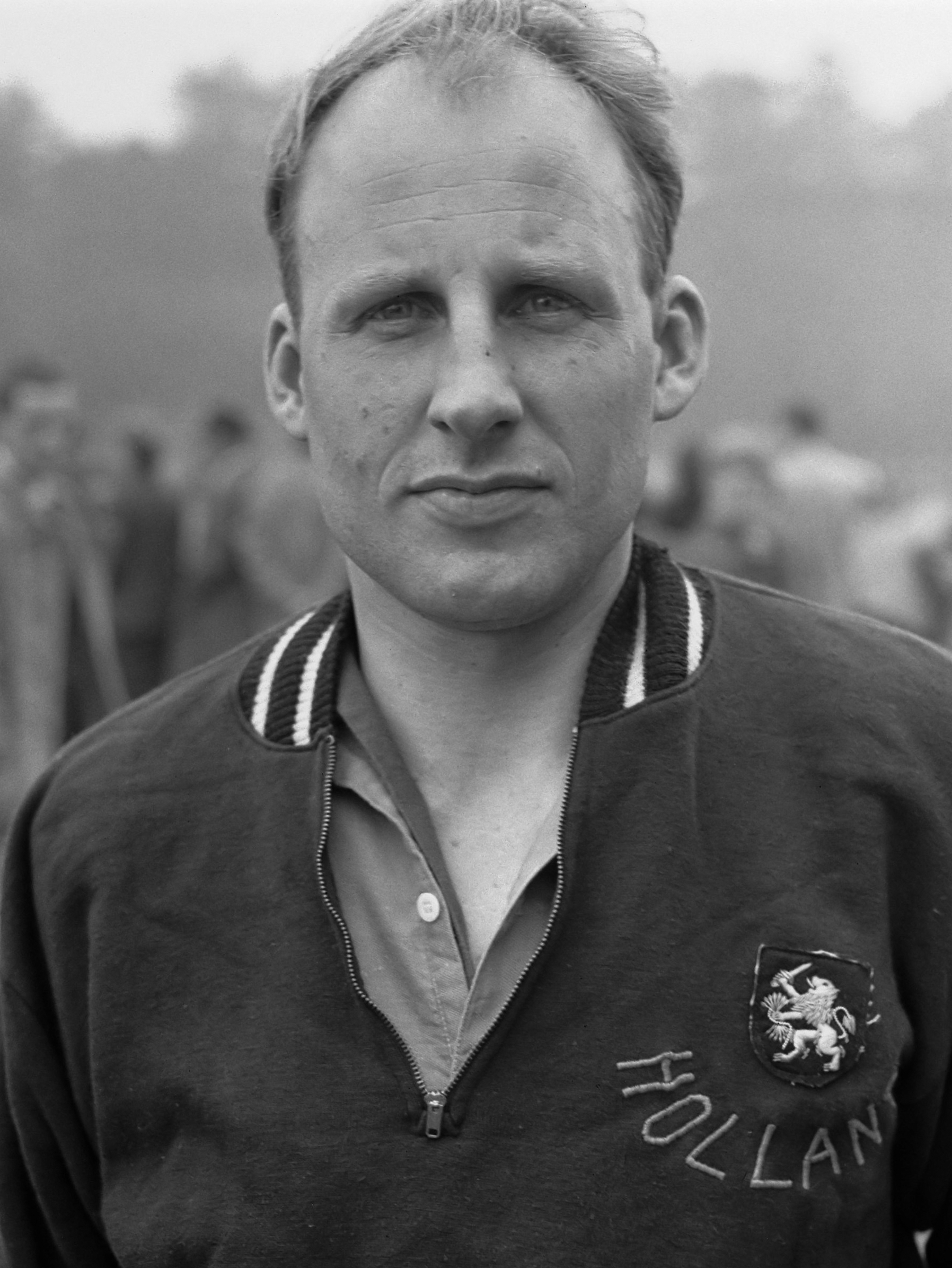
- Drijver in 1956

Medal record

Men's field hockey

Representing Netherlands

Olympic Games
| Silver medal – second place | 1952 Helsinki | Team competition |
| Bronze medal – third place | 1948 London | Team competition |

Johan Frederik "Han" Drijver (11 March 1927 in Eindhoven – 10 October 1986 in Vlaardingen) was a Dutch field hockey player who competed in the 1948 Summer Olympics and the 1952 Summer Olympics.

In the 1948 Summer Olympics, he was a member of the Dutch field hockey team, which won the bronze medal. He played all seven matches as a back.

Four years later, he won the silver medal as part of the Dutch team at the 1952 Summer Olympics. He played all three matches as a back.
