= Harry Derckx =

Dutch field hockey player

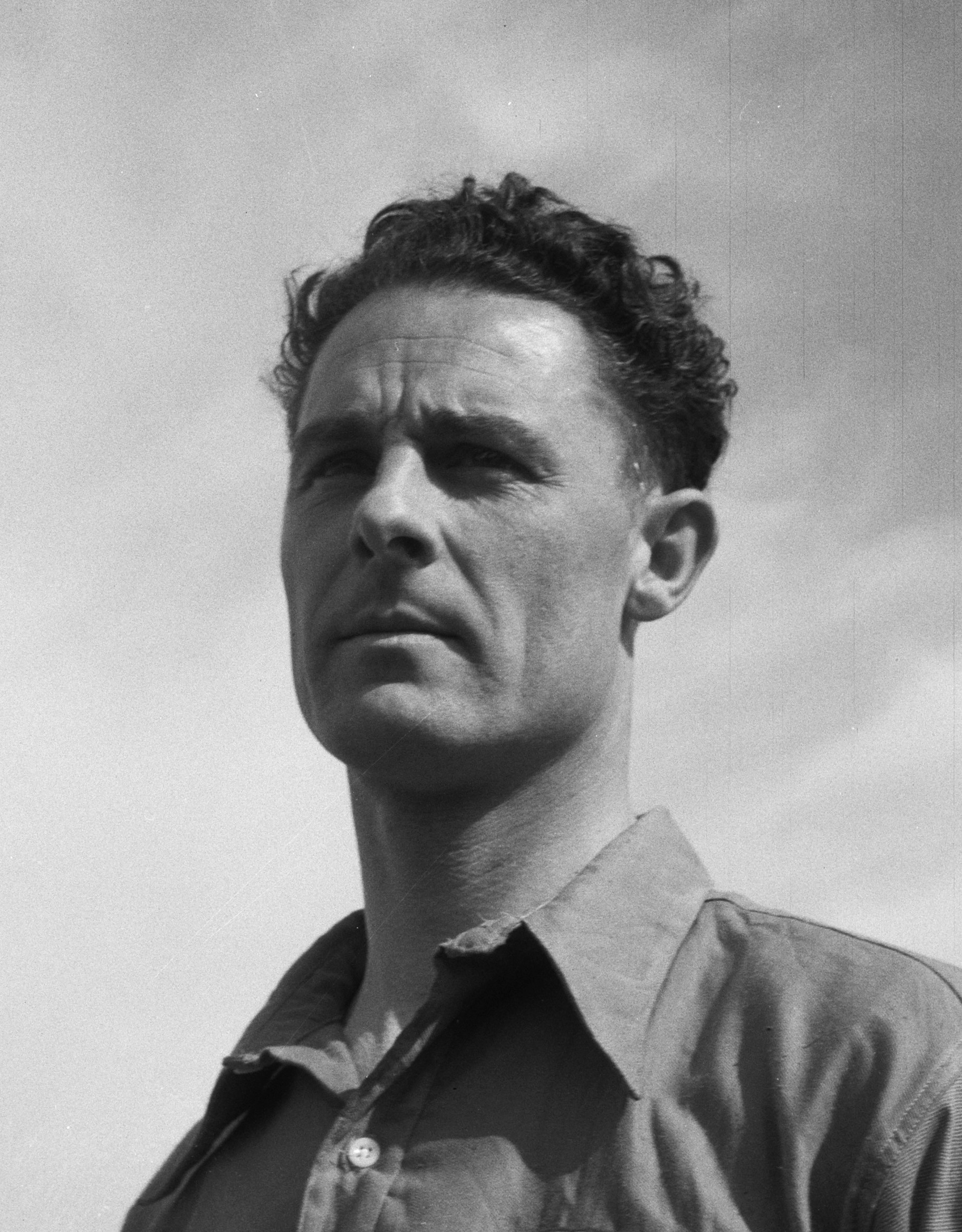
- Harry Derckx in 1952

Personal information
- Born: 19 March 1918 Saint-Pierre-lès-Nemours, Seine-et-Marne, France
- Died: 12 July 1983 (aged 65) Rucphen, the Netherlands

Sport
- Sport: Field hockey
- Club: DHV, Deventer
Medal record
Representing Netherlands
Olympic Games
Bronze medal – third place	1948 London	Team
Silver medal – second place	1952 Helsinki	Team

Henri "Harry" Jean Joseph Derckx (19 March 1918 – 12 July 1983) was a Dutch field hockey player who competed at the 1948 and 1952 Summer Olympics as back. In 1948, he played all seven matches for the Dutch team that won the bronze medal. Four years later he again played all matches and won the silver medal.
