= Heinz Schütz =

German field hockey player

Heinz Schütz (born 25 February 1926) was a German field hockey player who competed in the 1952 Summer Olympics.
