= Sergio Formenti =

Italian hockey player (1928–2009)

Personal information
- Nationality: Italian
- Born: 11 October 1928 Genoa, Italy
- Died: 23 July 2009 (aged 80)

Sport
- Sport: Field hockey

Sergio Formenti (11 October 1928 – 23 July 2009) was an Italian field hockey player. He competed in the men's tournament at the 1952 Summer Olympics.
