= Neil Nugent =

British field hockey player

Personal information
- Born: 6 December 1926
- Died: 12 April 2018 (aged 91)

Sport
- Sport: Field hockey
Senior career
Years	Team	Caps	Goals
1949–1952	Gravesend	-	-
1952–1956	Tulse Hill	-	-
National team
Years	Team	Caps	Goals
–	Great Britain		-
–	England		-
Medal record
Men's field hockey
Representing Great Britain
Bronze medal – third place	1952 Helsinki	Team competition

Neil Algernon David Nugent (6 November 1926 – 12 April 2018) was a British field hockey player and RAF Wing Commander, who competed in the 1952 Summer Olympics.

== Biography ==
Nugent studied in St.George's College, Mussoorie, Uttarakhand, India from 1934 to 1944.

Nugent played hockey for Gravesend and Tulse Hill at club level and Kent at county level.

He represented Great Britain in the field hockey tournament at the 1952 Olympic Games in Helsinki, winning the bronze medal. He played two matches as forward, but due to injury did not appear in all of the games and did not receive a medal with the rest of team.

In 1953, Nugent joined the Royal Air Force as a Flying Officer and would eventually be promoted to the rank of Wing Commander.

He was retroactively awarded his medal in 2010, along with one of his teammates, 58 years on. He died in April 2018 at the age of 91.
