= Gilbert Recordon =

Swiss field hockey player

Gilbert Maurice Recordon
Personal information
- Nationality: Swiss
- Born: 15 January 1931 Sainte-Croix, Switzerland

Sport
- Sport: Field hockey

Gilbert Recordon (born 15 January 1931) is a Swiss field hockey player. He competed at the 1952 Summer Olympics and the 1960 Summer Olympics.
