= Eddy Tiel =

Dutch field hockey player

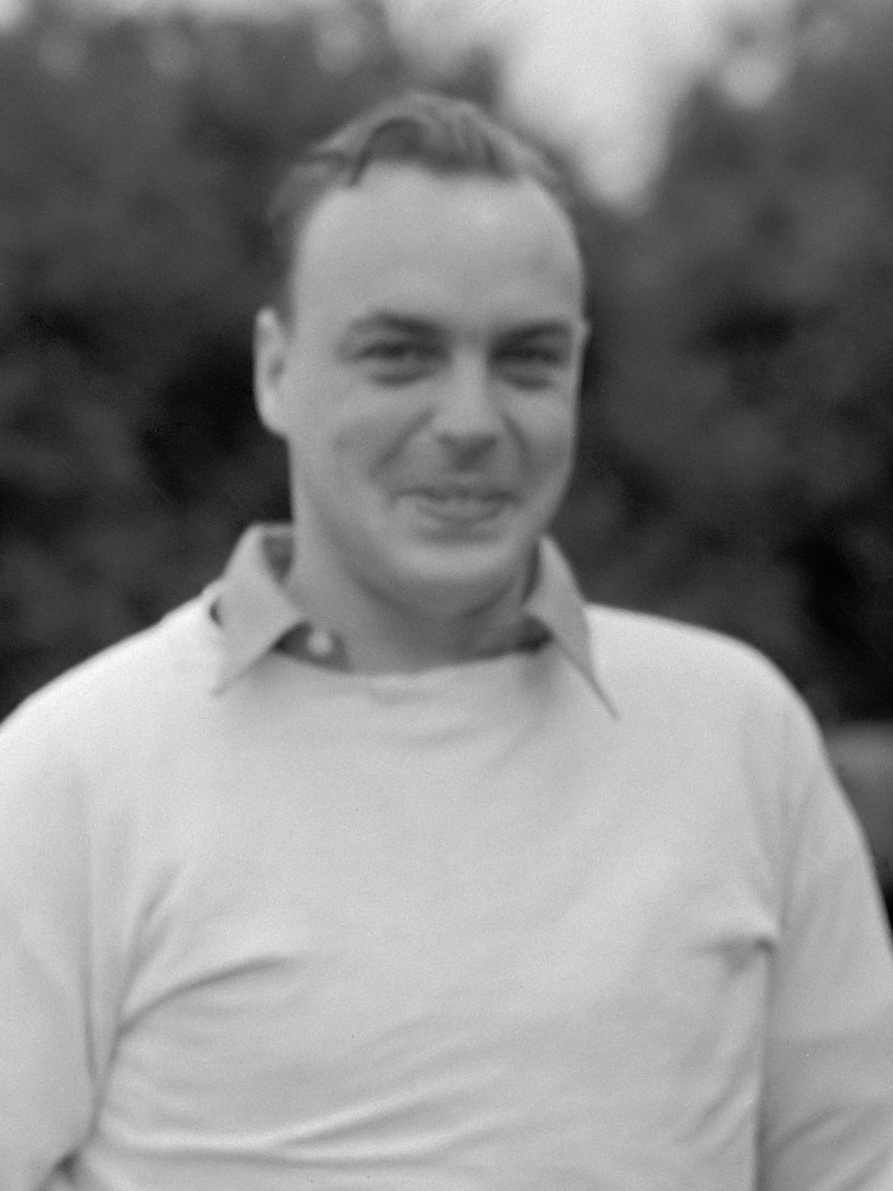
- Tiel in 1952

Medal record

Men's field hockey

Representing Netherlands

Olympic Games
Silver medal – second place	1952 Helsinki	Team competition
Bronze medal – third place	1948 London	Team competition

Eduard ("Eddy") Herbert Tiel (December 29, 1926 in The Hague – February 21, 1993 in Emst) was a Dutch field hockey player who competed in the 1948 and 1952 Summer Olympics.

In 1948, he was a member of the Dutch field hockey team, which won the bronze medal. He played all seven matches as halfback.

Four years later, he won the silver medal as part of the Dutch team. He played all three matches as halfback.
