= Giorgio Ravalli =

Italian field hockey player (1925–2001)

Personal information
- Nationality: Italian
- Born: 20 May 1925
- Died: 27 October 2001 (aged 76)

Sport
- Sport: Field hockey

Giorgio Ravalli (20 May 1925 – 27 October 2001) was an Italian field hockey player. He competed in the men's tournament at the 1952 Summer Olympics.
