= Meldric Daluz =

Indian field hockey player (1921–2011)

Olympic medal record

Men's Field Hockey

Representing India
Gold medal – first place	1952 Helsinki	Team competition

Meldric St. Clair Daluz Vieira (February 1, 1921 – August 2, 2011) was an Indian hockey player. He was part of the Indian hockey team that won the gold medal in 1952 Summer Olympics at Helsinki. He played in one match in the competition as a halfback.
