= M. Patricia Adamski =

American academic

M. Patricia Adamski is an American legal scholar and Adolph J. and Dorothy R. Eckhardt Distinguished Professor of Corporate Law at Hofstra University.
