= Léo Rooman =

Belgian field hockey player (1928–2019)

Personal information
- Nationality: Belgian
- Born: 28 July 1928 Antwerp, Belgium
- Died: 17 January 2019 (aged 90) Berchem, Antwerp, Belgium

Sport
- Sport: Field hockey

Léo Rooman (28 July 1928 – 17 January 2019) was a Belgian field hockey player. He competed in the men's tournament at the 1952 Summer Olympics.
