= Antoni Adamski =

Polish field hockey player

Personal information
- Nationality: Polish
- Born: 29 May 1932 Gniezno County, Poland
- Died: 26 March 2001 (aged 68) Szczecin, Poland
- Height: 179 cm (5 ft 10 in)
- Weight: 74 kg (163 lb)

Sport
- Sport: Field hockey

Achievements and titles
- Olympic finals: 1952 Summer Olympics
- Updated on 31 July 2014

Antoni Adamski (29 May 1932 – 26 March 2001) was a Polish field hockey player from Szczytniki Duchowne, Wielkopolskie who competed in the 1952 Summer Olympics.

He was part of the Polish field hockey team, which competed in the Olympic tournament. He played as halfback in two matches: Poland's only match in the main tournament and one match in the consolation tournament.
