= Roger Morlet =

Belgian field hockey player

Personal information
- Full name: Roger Édouard Morlet
- Nationality: Belgian
- Born: 19 September 1930 Brussels, Belgium

Sport
- Sport: Field hockey

Roger Morlet (born 19 September 1930) is a Belgian field hockey player. He competed in the men's tournament at the 1952 Summer Olympics.
