= Chaman Singh Gurung =

Indian field hockey player

Olympic medal record

Men's Field Hockey

Representing India

Olympic Games
Gold medal – first place	1952 Helsinki	Team competition

Chaman Singh Gurung was an Indian field hockey player, who was a member of the 1952 Helsinki Olympics hockey team that won the gold medal. He was educated in Goethals Memorial School, Kurseong, and after retiring from playing professional field hockey, he went on to be the games master in his alma mater. Gurung's Olympic gold medal is reportedly missing.
