= Hermann Knoll =

Austrian ice hockey player

Personal information
- Nationality: Austrian
- Born: 10 December 1931 Vienna, Austria
- Died: 26 March 2015 (aged 83)

Sport
- Sport: Ice hockey

Hermann Knoll (10 December 1931 – 26 March 2015) was an Austrian ice hockey player. He competed in the men's tournaments at the 1956 Winter Olympics and the 1964 Winter Olympics. He also competed in the field hockey tournament at the 1952 Summer Olympics.
