= Toivo Salminen =

Finnish hockey player

Personal information
- Nationality: Finnish
- Born: 29 November 1923 Hämeenlinna, Finland
- Died: 24 October 1991 (aged 67)

Sport
- Sport: Field hockey

Toivo Salminen (29 November 1923 – 24 October 1991) was a Finnish field hockey player. He competed in the men's tournament at the 1952 Summer Olympics.
