= Latif Mir =

Pakistani field hockey player

Personal information
- Full name: Abdul Latif Mir
- Nationality: Pakistani
- Born: 16 April 1916
- Died: Between 1967 and 1978

Sport
- Sport: Field hockey

Abdul Latif Mir (born 16 April 1916) was a Pakistani field hockey player. He competed in the men's tournament at the 1952 Summer Olympics, where Pakistan placed fourth.

Mir died some time between 1967 and 1978.
