= Rolf Stoltenberg =

German field hockey player

Rolf Stoltenberg (born 8 January 1922) is a German former field hockey player who competed in the 1952 Summer Olympics.
