= Roger Midgley =

British field hockey player (1924–2019)

Personal information
- Born: 23 November 1924 Plympton, England
- Died: 12 December 2019 (aged 95)

Sport
- Sport: Field hockey
Senior career
Years	Team	Caps	Goals
1947–1960	Royal Navy & Combined Services	-	-
National team
Years	Team	Caps	Goals
–	Great Britain		-
–	England		-
Medal record
Men's field hockey
Representing United Kingdom
Bronze medal – third place	1952 Helsinki	Team competition

Roger Keith Midgley (23 November 1924 – 12 December 2019) was a British field hockey player who competed in the 1952 Summer Olympics.

== Biography ==
Midgley represented Great Britain in the field hockey tournament at the 1952 Olympic Games in Helsinki, winning a bronze medal. He played all three matches as a back.

Midley served with the Royal Navy and would eventually be promoted to the rank of commander. He captained the Royal Navy and Combined Services hockey teams and made his England debut in 1951 during the Festival of Britain Games.

He played representative hockey for the Hockey Association and county hockey for Devon and Hampshire.
