= Grahanandan Singh =

Indian field hockey player

Olympic medal record

Men's Field Hockey

Representing India

Olympic Games
| Gold medal – first place | 1948 London | Team competition |
| Gold medal – first place | 1952 Helsinki | Team competition |

Grahanandan Singh (18 February 1926 in Lyallpur, British India – 7 December 2014 in New Delhi, India) was an Indian field hockey player who won two gold medals, at the 1948 and 1952 Summer Olympics. There is a documentary film on the team.
