= Richard Norris (field hockey) =

British field hockey player

Personal information
- Born: 10 December 1931 Bombay, British India
- Died: 25 August 2012 in Pretoria, Gauteng, South Africa

Sport
- Sport: Field hockey
- Position: Forward
Senior career
Years	Team	Caps	Goals
1952–1955	Oxford University	-	-
1957–1959	Reading	-	-
National team
Years	Team	Caps	Goals
–	Great Britain	5	(4)
–	England	17	(18)
Medal record
Men's field hockey
Representing United Kingdom
Bronze medal – third place	1952 Helsinki	Team competition

Richard Owen Alfred Norris (10 December 1931 – 25 August 2012) was a British field hockey player who competed at the 1952 Summer Olympics, winning a bronze medal.

== Biography ==
Norris was born in British India but was educated at The King's School, Canterbury. He played hockey, rugby and cricket at school and played in the Junior Wimbledon Championships. He then studied engineering at Trinity College, Oxford and played for the University hockey team earning his blue.

He represented Great Britain in the field hockey tournament at the 1952 Olympic Games in Helsinki. He was the youngest member of the British field hockey team, which won the bronze medal. He played all three matches as forward.

He later played county hockey for Kent and club hockey for Reading Hockey Club.

Norris was among the surviving team members who had a reunion at the London Olympics to celebrate the 60th Anniversary of their medal winning achievement.
