= Lau Mulder =

Dutch field hockey player

Olympic medal record

Men's field hockey

Representing Netherlands
Silver medal – second place	1952 Helsinki	Team competition

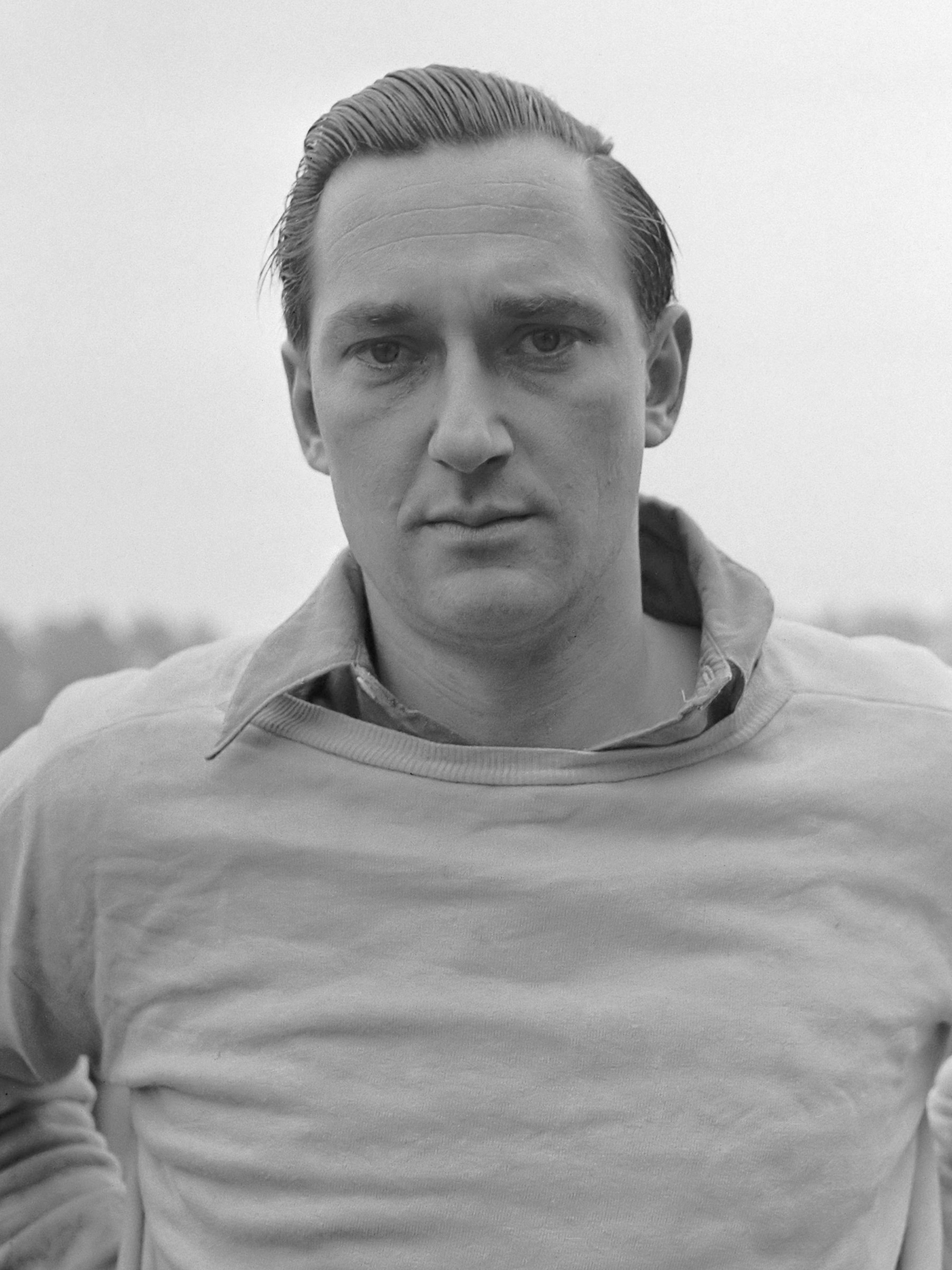
Laurens Siebrand Mulder (1956)

Laurens ("Lau") Siebrand Mulder (7 July 1927 in Batavia, Dutch East Indies – 29 January 2006 in Uithoorn) was a Dutch field hockey player who competed in the 1952 Summer Olympics.

He was a member of the Dutch field hockey team, which won the silver medal. He played all three matches as goalkeeper.
