= Bronisław Pawlicki =

Polish field hockey player

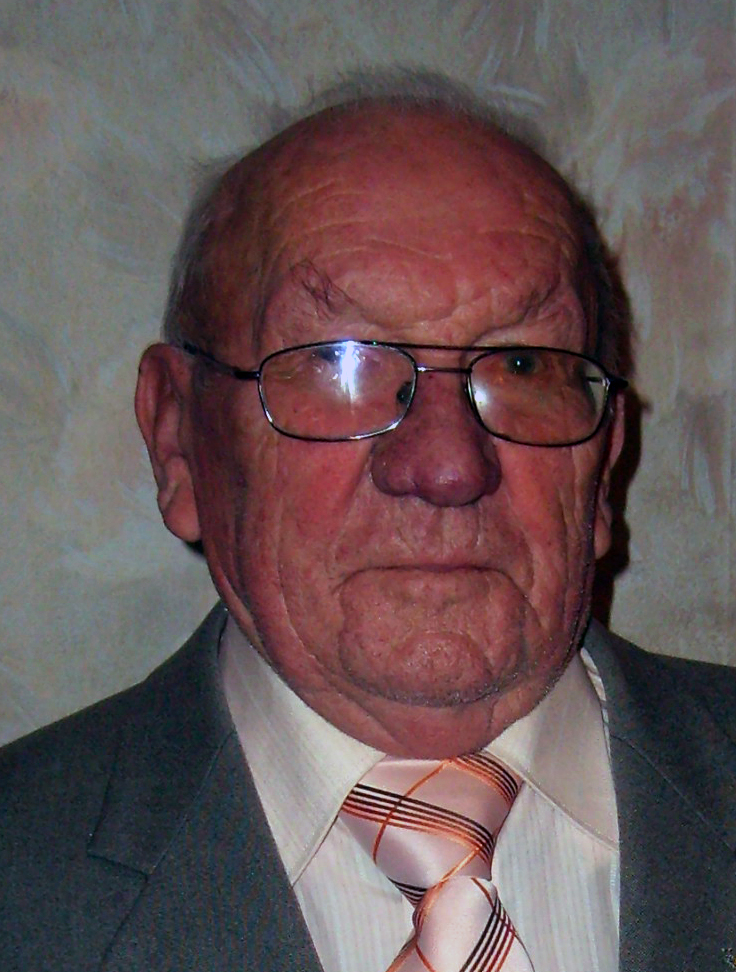
Bronisław Pawlicki, Polish field hockey player

Bronisław Pawlicki (28 December 1925 – 19 September 2014) was a Polish field hockey player who competed in the 1952 Summer Olympics. He was born in Zakrzewo.

Pawlicki was part of the Polish field hockey team, which competed in the 1952 Olympic tournament. He played as back in the only match for Poland in the main tournament. Pawlicki died on 19 September 2014, aged 88, in Gniezno.
