= Esko Salminen (field hockey) =

Finnish field hockey player

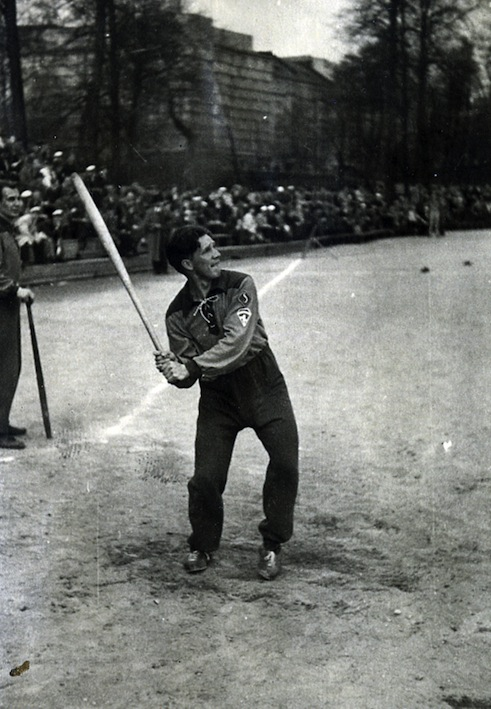
- Esko Salminen in 1958

Personal information
- Nationality: Finnish
- Born: 6 July 1920 Helsinki, Finland
- Died: 16 April 1998 (aged 77) Helsinki, Finland

Sport
- Sport: Field hockey

Esko Salminen (6 July 1920 – 16 April 1998) was a Finnish field hockey player. He competed in the men's tournament at the 1952 Summer Olympics.
