= C. S. Dubey (field hockey) =

Indian field hockey player

Olympic medal record

Men's field hockey

Representing India
Gold medal – first place	1952 Helsinki	Team competition

C. S. Dubey was an Indian professional field hockey player. He was part of the India hockey team which won gold medal at the 1952 Summer Olympics and also part of football club Mohun Bagan in 1948.

He was from Varanasi.
