= Dick Loggere =

Dutch field hockey player (1921–2014)

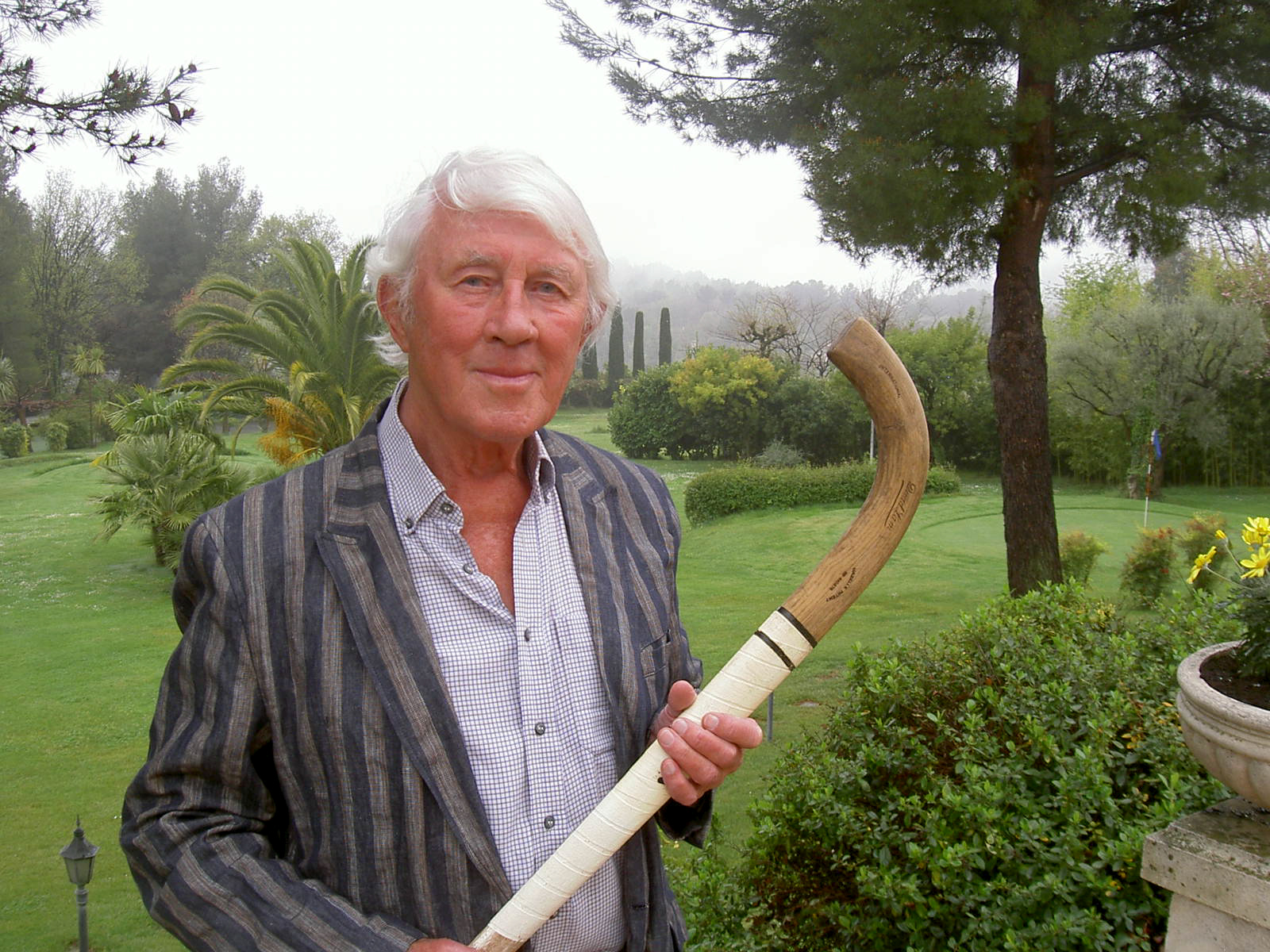
- Dick Loggere in 2008

Medal record

Men's field hockey

Representing Netherlands
Silver medal – second place	1952 Helsinki	Team competition
Bronze medal – third place	1948 London	Team competition

Hermanus Pieter "Dick" Loggere (6 May 1921 – 30 December 2014) was a Dutch field hockey player who competed in the 1948 Summer Olympics and in the 1952 Summer Olympics. He was born in Amsterdam.

In 1948 he was a member of the Dutch field hockey team, which won the bronze medal. He played all seven matches as halfback.

Four years later he won the silver medal as part of the Dutch team. He played all three matches as halfback.

He was the founder of the Loggere Metaalwerken company.
