= Wilfried Grube =

German field hockey player

Wilfried Grube (born 1 May 1923) is a German former field hockey player who competed in the 1952 Summer Olympics.
