= Dennis Eagan =

British field hockey player

Personal information
- Born: 13 August 1926 Quetta, British India
- Died: 1 July 2012 (aged 85)

Sport
- Sport: Field hockey
- Position: half-back
Senior career
Years	Team	Caps	Goals
1951–1958	Army	-	-
National team
Years	Team	Caps	Goals
–	Great Britain		-
–	England	8	-
Medal record
Men's field hockey
Representing Great Britain
Bronze medal – third place	1952 Helsinki	Team competition

Dennis Michael Royal Eagan (13 August 1926 – 1 July 2012) was a British field hockey player who competed in the 1952 Summer Olympics as a member of the British field hockey team, which won the bronze medal. He played all three matches as halfback.

== Biography ==
Born in Quetta, British India, Eagan was educated at Gresham's School

Egan played club hockey for the Army, Aldershot Services and at county level played for Hampshire.

He earned eight caps for Great Britain in total.

He represented Great Britain in the field hockey tournament at the 1952 Olympic Games in Helsinki.

Egan had a distinguished career in the Royal Engineers separate from his achievements in hockey, retiring as a Colonel. After he ceased playing hockey he became a respected administrator in the game, as secretary of the Hockey Association and European Hockey Association, and treasurer and then vice-president of the British Olympic Association.
