= Leonard Wery =

Dutch field hockey player (1926–2019)

Olympic medal record

Men's field hockey

Representing Netherlands
Silver medal – second place	1952 Helsinki	Team competition

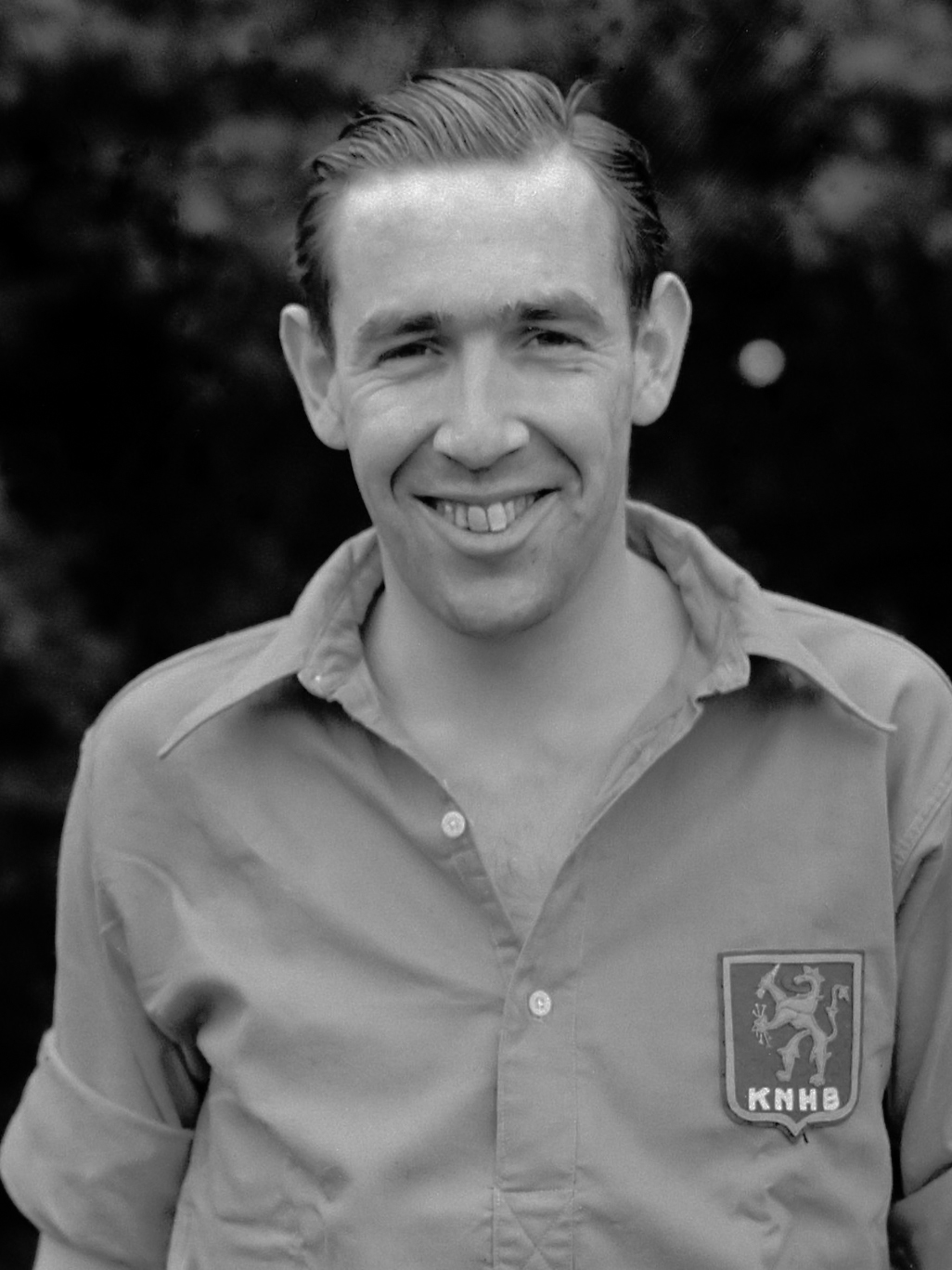
Leo Wery (1952)

Leonard Hugo "Leo" Wery (March 27, 1926 – August 29, 2019) was a Dutch field hockey player who competed in the 1952 Summer Olympics. He was a member of the Dutch field hockey team, which won the silver medal. He played all three matches as forward. After the end of his professional hockey career, Wery had a career at the Royal Dutch/Shell Oil Company as a lawyer. He was born in The Hague.
