= André Boerstra =

Dutch field hockey player (1924–2016)

Olympic medal record

Men's field hockey

Representing Netherlands
| Silver medal – second place | 1952 Helsinki | Team competition |
| Bronze medal – third place | 1948 London | Team competition |

Andries Cornelis Dirk "André" Boerstra (11 December 1924 – 17 March 2016) was a Dutch field hockey player who competed in the 1948 Summer Olympics and in the 1952 Summer Olympics. He was born in Bandoeng, Dutch East Indies. In 1948 he was a member of the Dutch field hockey team, which won the bronze medal. He played all seven matches as forward. Four years later he won the silver medal as part of the Dutch team. He played all three matches as forward.
