= Wilhelm Suhren =

German field hockey player

Wilhelm Suhren (born 2 August 1927) is a German former field hockey player who competed in the 1952 Summer Olympics.
