= Asghar Ali Khan (field hockey) =

Pakistani field hockey player

Personal information
- Nationality: Pakistani
- Born: 26 February 1926

Sport
- Sport: Field hockey

Asghar Ali Khan (born 26 February 1926) was a Pakistani field hockey player. He competed in the men's tournament at the 1952 Summer Olympics, where Pakistan placed fourth.
