= Aziz Malik =

Pakistani field hockey player (born 1916)

Personal information
- Full name: Abdul Aziz Malik
- Nationality: Pakistani
- Born: 16 April 1916 Rawalpindi, British India

Sport
- Sport: Field hockey
- Position: Left-in

Abdul Aziz Malik (born 16 April 1916, date of death unknown) was a Pakistani field hockey player. He played 23 International matches for Pakistan and scored an impressive 28 goals in his International career . He competed in the field hockey tournaments at the 1948 Summer Olympics and the 1952 Summer Olympics, with Pakistan placing fourth on both occasions.
