= Tadeusz Adamski =

Polish field hockey player

Personal information
- Nationality: Polish
- Born: 19 July 1922 Poznań, Poland
- Died: 28 December 2001 (aged 79) Poznań, Poland

Sport
- Sport: Field hockey

Tadeusz Adamski (19 July 1922 – 28 December 2001) was a Polish field hockey player. He competed in the 1952 Summer Olympics.
