= Michel Lacroix =

French field hockey player

Michel Francois Maximilien Lacroix (10 November 1921 – 10 November 1974) was a French field hockey player who competed in the 1948 Summer Olympics and in the 1952 Summer Olympics.
