= Latif-ur Rehman =

Indian field hockey player (1929–1987)

Medal record

Men's field hockey

Olympic Games

Representing India
Gold medal – first place	1948 London	Team

Representing Pakistan
Silver medal – second place	1956 Melbourne	Team

Latif-ur Rehman (1 January 1929 – 27 February 1987), also known as Latifur Rehman, was a field hockey player who competed internationally for India and Pakistan. He won a gold medal as a member of India's team at the 1948 Summer Olympics and a silver medal playing for Pakistan at the 1956 Summer Olympics. The 1956 silver was Pakistan's first ever Olympic medal.
