= Jules Ancion =

Dutch field hockey player (1924–2011)

Olympic medal record

Men's field hockey

Representing Netherlands
Silver medal – second place	1952 Helsinki	Team competition

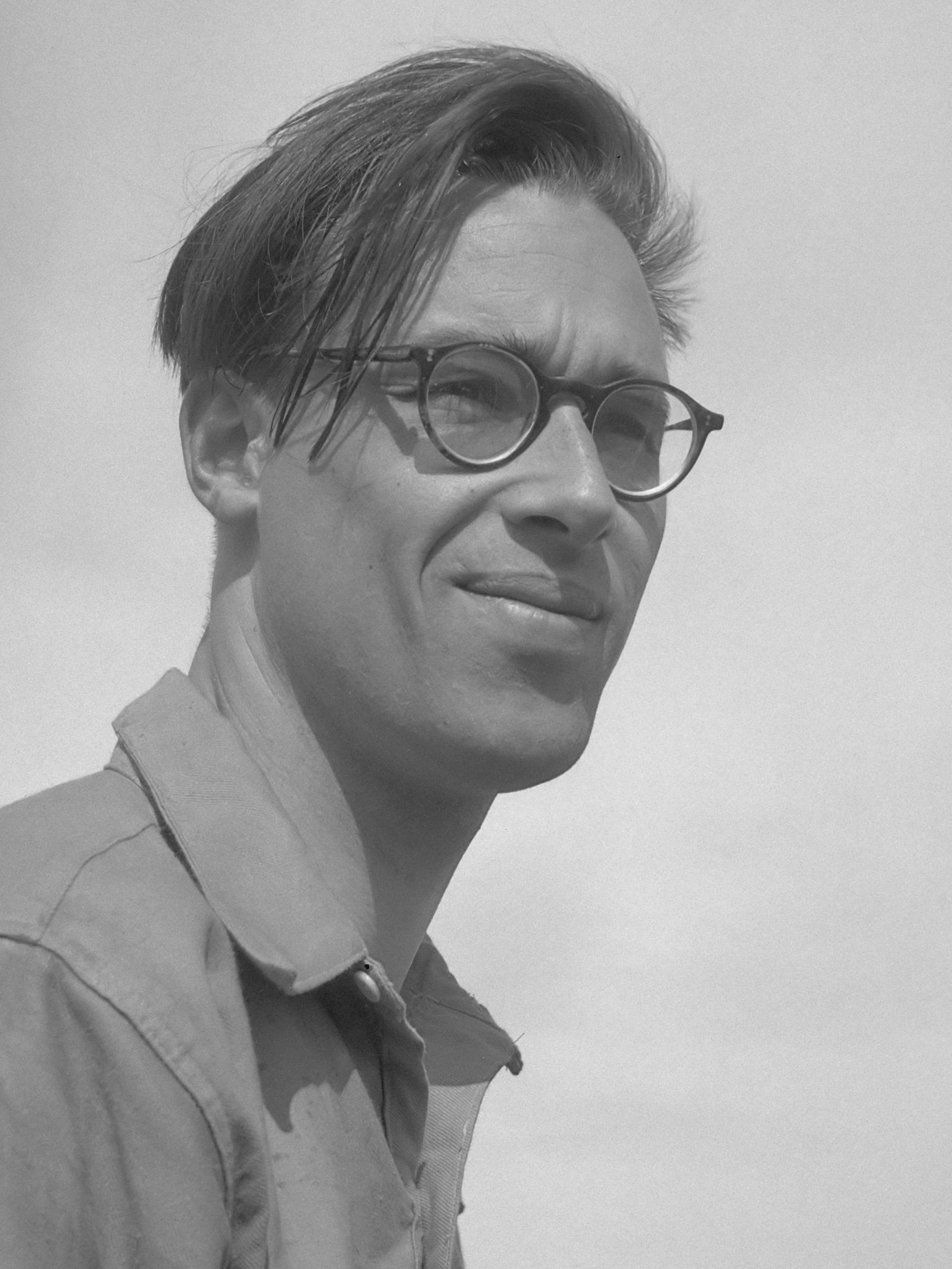
Jules Ancion (1952)

Julius Theodoor "Jules" Ancion (August 21, 1924 – November 30, 2011) was a Dutch field hockey player who competed at the 1952 Summer Olympics. He was born in Palembang, Dutch East Indies.

He was a member of the Dutch field hockey team, which won the silver medal. He played all three matches as halfback.
