= Wim van Heel =

Dutch field hockey player (1922–1972)

Olympic medal record

Men's field hockey

Representing Netherlands
Silver medal – second place	1952 Helsinki	Team competition
Bronze medal – third place	1948 London	Team competition

Willem ("Wim") van Heel (27 September 1922 in The Hague – 3 October 1972 in Middelburg) was a Dutch field hockey player who competed in the 1948 Summer Olympics and in the 1952 Summer Olympics.

In 1948 he was a member of the Dutch field hockey team, which won the bronze medal. He played all seven matches as forward.

Four years later he won the silver medal as part of the Dutch team. He played all three matches as forward.
