= Dick Esser =

Dutch field hockey player (1918–1979)

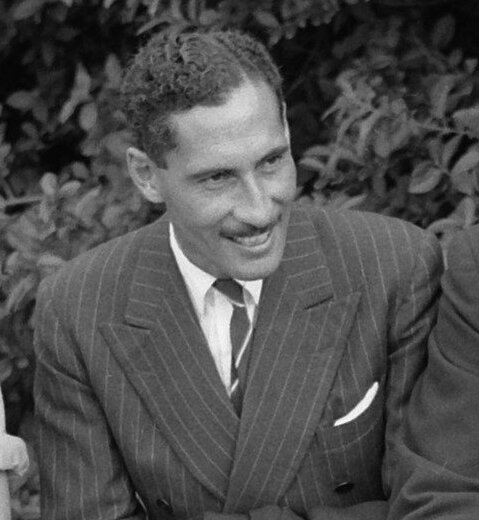

Medal record

Men's field hockey

Representing Netherlands
Silver medal – second place	1952 Helsinki	Team competition
Bronze medal – third place	1948 London	Team competition

Rius Theo "Dick" Esser (9 July 1918 – 8 March 1979) was a Dutch field hockey player who competed in the 1948 Summer Olympics and in the 1952 Summer Olympics. He was born in Makassar, Dutch East Indies.

In 1948, he was a member of the Dutch field hockey team, which won the bronze medal. He played all seven matches as forward.

Four years later he won the silver medal as part of the Dutch team. He played all three matches as forward.

Esser died in Leiden.
