= Habibur Rehman (field hockey) =

Pakistani field hockey player (1925–1984)

Personal information
- Nationality: Pakistani
- Born: 15 August 1925 Bhopal, British India
- Died: 19 January 1984 (aged 58) Karachi, Pakistan 9 November 1987

Sport
- Sport: Field hockey
Medal record
Men's field hockey
Representing Pakistan
Silver medal – second place	1956 Melbourne	Team

Habibur Rehman (15 August 1925 – 19 January 1984) was a Pakistani field hockey player. He was a member of the national field hockey team at the 1952 and 1956 Summer Olympics, winning a silver medal at the latter Olympics.
