= Field hockey at the 1948 Summer Olympics – Men's team squads =

Field hockey at the 1948 Summer Olympics

Tournament details
- Host country: Great Britain
- City: London
- Teams: 13
- Venue(s): Guinness Ground, Park Royal; Lyons' Ground, Sudbury; Polytechnic Ground, Chiswick; Wembley Stadium

Tournament statistics
- Matches played: 49
- Goals scored: 118 (2.41 per match)

== Afghanistan ==
Manager: Shahzada Muhammad Yusuf

Pos.	Player	DoB	Age	Caps	Club	Tournament games	Tournament goals
	Mohammad Attai					3	0
	G. Jagi					2	0
	Mohammad Khogaini					3	0
	Bakhteyar Gulam Mangal	1928				3	1
	Ahmed Jahan Nuristani					3	0
	Abdul Kadir Nuristani	1925				3	0
	Din Mohammad Nuristani	1928				3	0
	Jahan Gulam Nuristani	1925				2	0
	Mohammad Amin Nuristani	1928				2	0
	Mohammad Jahan Nuristani					1	?
	Mohammad Kadir Nuristani	1925		?		3	?
	Ahmad Tajik			?		1
	Khan Nasrullah Totakhail	1925		?		3	?
	Ahmad Yusufzai			?		1	?

== Argentina ==
Head coach:

Pos.	Player	DoB	Age	Caps	Club	Tournament games	Tournament goals
	Roberto Anderson			?		3	1
	Luis Bianchi			?		3	0
	Juan Brigo			?		3	0
	Carlos Mercali			?		3	0
	Roberto Márquez			?		3	2
	Tommie Quinn	August 19, 1927	20	?	(Argentina) Hurling Club	3	0
	Valerio Sánchez			?		1	0
	Luis Scally	June 26, 1915	33	?	(Argentina) Hurling Club	3	0
	Tommy Scally	June 28, 1927	21	?	(Argentina) Hurling Club	3	2
	Tomás Wade			?	(Argentina) Hurling Club	3	0
	Jorge Wilson			?		2	0
	Ángel Zucchi			?		3	0

== Austria ==
Head coach:

No.	Pos.	Player	DoB	Age	Caps	Club	Tournament games	Tournament goals
	B	Adam Bischof	October 13, 1915	32	?		3	?
	FW	Karl Brandl	May 2, 1912	36	?		3	?
		Siegfried Egger			?		0	0
	B	Karl Holzapfel	October 20, 1923	24	?		3	?
		Wolfgang Klee			?		0	0
	FW	Johann Koller	April 3, 1921	27	?		2	?
	FW	Franz Lovato	February 28, 1923	25	?		3	?
	FW	Walter Niederle	February 17, 1921	27	?		3	?
	FW	Oskar Nowak	March 25, 1913	35	?		3	?
	FW	Karl Ördögh	March 10, 1908	40	?		2	?
		Josef Pecanka			?		0	0
	GK	Franz Raule	November 20, 1920	27	?		3	?
	HB	Friedrich Rückert	July 7, 1920	28	?		3	?
	HB	Franz Strachota	October 14, 1918	29	?		2	?
	HB	Ernst Schala	July 13, 1916	32	?		3	?

== Belgium ==
Head coach:

Pos.	Player	DoB	Age	Caps	Club	Tournament games	Tournament goals
	Lucien Boekmans	December 14, 1922	25			2	0
	Robert Cayman	March 17, 1919	28			4	0
	Henri Delaval	November 1, 1913	34			3	1
	José Delaval	March 27, 1921	27			4	0
	Jean Dubois	October 4, 1926	21		(Belgium) Royal Leopold Club	4	0
	Jean-Jacques Enderle	January 9, 1920	28			4	0
	Roger Goossens	December 7, 1926	21		(Belgium) Royal Leopold Club	3	0
	Jacques Kielbaey	July 28, 1920	27			4	0
	Harold Mechelynck	July 1, 1924	24			4	0
	Henri Niemegeerts	February 15, 1922	26			4	1
	Joseph Van Muylders	May 5, 1923	25			1	0
	Lucien Van Weydeveld	November 25, 1926	21			4	0
	André Waterkeyn	August 23, 1917	30			1	0

== Denmark ==
Head coach:

Pos.	Player	DoB	Age	Caps	Club	Tournament games	Tournament goals
	Preben Blach	December 15, 1920	27		(Denmark) Skovshoved IF, Klampenborg	4	1
	Ernest Bohr	March 7, 1924	24		(Denmark) Orient Lyngby Hockey Club	2	0
	Otto Busch	January 13, 1983	34		(Denmark) København Hockey Club	1	0
	Eigil Hansen	February 3, 1922	26		(Denmark) København Hockey Club	4	0
	Robert Hansen	March 23, 1911	37		(Denmark) Kalundborg HK	4	0
	Vagn Hovard	September 6, 1998	33		(Denmark) København Hockey Club	1	0
	Robert Jensen	February 2, 1916	32		(Denmark) Kalundborg HK	4	0
	Egon Johansen	November 9, 1919	28		(Denmark) Kalundborg HK	4	0
	Svend Jørgensen	December 24, 1904	43		(Denmark) København Hockey Club	3	0
	Vagn Loft	September 24, 1915	32		(Denmark) Orient Lyngby Hockey Club	2	0
	Erling Nielsen	May 1, 1922	26		(Denmark) Kalundborg HK	3	0
	Poul Moll Nielsen	April 21, 1930	18		(Denmark) Slagelse HK	1	0
	Jørgen Boye Nielsen	February 28, 1925	23		(Denmark) Orient Lyngby Hockey Club	4	0
	Hjalmar Thomsen	April 30, 1913	35		(Denmark) Skovshoved IF, Klampenborg	2	0
	Mogens Venge	March 29, 1912	36		(Denmark) København Hockey Club	3	0
	Henrik Sørensen	August 21, 1924	23		(Denmark) Kalundborg HK	2	0

== France ==
Head coach:

Pos.	Player	DoB	Age	Caps	Club	Tournament games	Tournament goals
	Bernard Boone	September 23, 1919	28			3	0
	Jacques Butin	September 20, 1925	22			4	0
	Guy Chevalier	December 5, 1910	37		(France) Lille MHC, Lille	2	0
	Jean-François Dubessay	April 1, 1921	27			3	0
	Claude Hauet	March 25, 1925	23			4	0
	Jean Hauet	March 25, 1925	23			4	0
	Michel Lacroix	November 10, 1921	26			4	0
	Robert Lucas	October 5, 1922	25			1	0
	Diran Manoukian	March 22, 1919	29		(France) Stade Français Hockey	4	0
	André Meyer	October 5, 1919	28			3	0
	Philippe Reynaud	February 3, 1922	26			4	0
	Jean Rouget	November 7, 1916	31			1	1
	Jacques Thieffry	May 10, 1924	24			4	0
	Pierre Vandame	June 17, 1913	35			3	1

== Great Britain ==
Head coach:

Pos.	Player	DoB	Age	Caps	Club	Tournament games	Tournament goals
GK	Dave Brodie	29 May 1910	38		(Scotland) Babcock and Wilcox Hockey Club	5	0
HB	George Sime	28 February 1915	33		(Scotland) Stepps Hockey Club	5	0
LB	William Lindsay	3 March 1916	32		(Republic of Ireland) Corinthian Hockey Club	5	0
HB	Michael Walford	27 November 1915	32		(England) Sherborne Hockey Club	5	0
HB	Frank Reynolds	21 August 1917	30		(England) Army Hockey Association	5	1
	Robin Lindsay	11 January 1914	34		(England) Teddington Hockey Club	5	0
	John Peake	26 August 1924	23		(England) Combined Services	5	1
	Neil White	2 May 1920	28		(England) University of Cambridge	4	3
	Bob Adlard	15 November 1915	32		(England) Cheltenham Hockey Club	5	5
IL	Norman Borrett	1 October 1917	30		(England) Taunton Vale Hockey Club	5	10
	William Griffiths	26 June 1922	26		(Wales) Newport Athletic Hockey Club	5	1
	Ronald Davies	28 December 1914	33		(Wales) Cardiff Hockey Club	1	0
	Edgar Hitchman	27 May 1915	33		(Wales) Cardiff Hockey Club	0	0
OL	William Greene	c.1916	32		(England) School of Military Engineering (Ripon)	0	0
	Bryn Thomas	29 April 1912	36		(Wales) Cardiff Hockey Club	0	0
LB	Peter Whitbread	28 March 1917	31		(England) Old Kingstonian Hockey Club	0	0
	Archie Young	1912	36		(Scotland) Whitecraigs Hockey Club	0	0

== India ==
Head coach: NN Mukherjee

Pos.	Player	DoB	Age	Caps	Club	Tournament games	Tournament goals
HB	Kishan Lal	February 2, 1917	31		(India) Indian Railways	5	2
GK	Ranganathan Francis	March 15, 1920	28			2	0
GK	Leo Pinto	April 11, 1914	34		(India) Tata Sports Club	3	0
	Walter D’Souza	December 16, 1920	27		(India) Lusitanian Hockey Team	1	0
RB	Trilochan Singh	February 12, 1923	25		(Pakistan) Brothers Club	5	2
	Akhtar Hussain	August 23, 1926	21			1	0
B	K. D. Singh 'Babu'	February 22, 1922	26			5	4
FB	Randhir Singh Gentle	September 22, 1922	25			3	0
HB	Keshav Dutt	December 29, 1925	22			5	0
	Amir Kumar	August 10, 1923	24			4	0
	Maxie Vaz	1923	25			4	0
CF	Balbir Singh Sr.	December 31, 1923	23		(India) Punjab Police	4	8
	Patrick Jansen	December 14, 1920	27			5	7
	Latif-ur Rehman	January 1, 1929	19			1	0
	Lawrie Fernandes	1929	19			4	0
	Gerry Glackan	1923	25			1	1
	Reginald Rodrigues	May 29, 1922	26			1	1
	Grahanandan Singh	February 18, 1926	22		(India) Services (Indian Navy)	2	0
CH	Jaswant Singh Rajput	1926	22		(India) Bhowanipore	1	0
HB	Leslie Claudius	March 25, 1927	21		(India) Bengal Nagpur Railway	1	0

== Netherlands ==
Head coach:

Pos.	Player	DoB	Age	Caps	Club	Tournament games	Tournament goals
FW	André Boerstra	December 11, 1924	23		(Netherlands) HHIJC	7	3
	Henk Bouwman	June 30, 1926	33		(Netherlands) Bloemendaal	1	0
	Piet Bromberg	March 4, 1917	31		(Netherlands) HHIJC	7	7
HB	Harry Derckx	March 19, 1918	30		(Netherlands) DHV	7	0
HB	Han Drijver	March 11, 1927	21		(Netherlands) TOGO	7	0
	Dick Esser	July 9, 1918	30		(Netherlands) TOGO	7	1
	Wim van Heel	September 27, 1922	25		(Netherlands) HHIJC	7	0
	Roepie Kruize	January 18, 1925	23		(Netherlands) HHIJC	6	6
	Jenne Langhout	September 27, 1918	29		(Netherlands) HMHC	7	0
GK	Ton Richter	November 16, 1919	28		(Netherlands) Be Fair	7	0
CM	Dick Loggere	May 6, 1921	27		(Netherlands) Laren	7	0
	Eddy Tiel	December 29, 1926	21		(Netherlands) HHIJC	7	0

== Pakistan ==
Head coach:

Pos.	Player	DoB	Age	Caps	Club	Tournament games	Tournament goals
	Aziz Malik	April 16, 1916	32		(Pakistan) West Punjab Police	7	9
	Mukhtar Bhatti	October 1932	16		(Pakistan) Brothers Club	3	0
	Hamidullah Burki	November 10, 1920	27		(Pakistan) Brothers Club	6	0
	Ali Dara	April 1, 1915	33		(Pakistan) Aryans, Lahore	7	10
	Milton D'Mello				(Pakistan) BOAC	1	0
	Abdul Hamid	January 7, 1927	21		(Pakistan) NWFP	3	1
	Abdul Ghafoor Khan	1920	26		(Pakistan) Aryans, Lahore	4	0
	Abdul Qayyum Khan	November 1922	25		(Pakistan) Pak Independents	1	0
	Aziz-ur Rehman	1923	24		(Pakistan) Pak Independents	2	0
	Niaz Khan	August 21, 1917	30		(Pakistan) Naeem Club	6	0
	Khawaja Muhammad Taqi	1918	30		(Pakistan) Pak Independents	2	0
	Muhammad Khurram	March 1920	27		(Pakistan) Aryans, Lahore	1	0
	Masood Ahmed Khan	June 1918	28		(Pakistan) Brothers Club	6	1
	Anwar Baig	November 1924	22		(Pakistan) Frontier	6	0
	Abdul Razzaq	1921	25		(Pakistan) Aryans, Lahore	6	1
	Syed Muhammad Salim	September 5, 1909	38		(Pakistan) Naeem Club, Lahore	1	0
	Shazada Muhammad Shah-Rukh	October 2, 1926	21		(Pakistan) Aryans, Lahore	6	0
	Mahmood-ul Hassan	August 10, 1924	23		(Pakistan) Burma Shell	4	0
	Remat Ullah Sheikh	February 1921	27		(Pakistan) Septans Club, Rawalpindi	5	0

== Spain ==
Head coach:

Pos.	Player	DoB	Age	Caps	Club	Tournament games	Tournament goals
HB	Manuel Agustín	April 12, 1912	36		(Spain) Barcelona	3	0
FW	Jaime Allende	July 22, 1924	24			3	0
DF	Ricardo Cabot Boix	January 12, 1917	31		(Spain) Barcelona	1	0
FW	Juan del Campo	February 1, 1923	25			2	0
	Enrique Estébanez	October 23, 1912	35		(Spain) Atlético Madrid	1	0
	Pedro Farreras	April 4, 1916	32		(Spain) Real Club de Polo	3	0
	Pedro Gasset	July 22, 1924	24		(Spain) Atlètic Terrassa	3	2
	Eduardo Jardón	October 3, 1914	33		(Spain) Club de Campo	1	0
	Fernando Jardón	August 16, 1916	31		(Spain) Club de Campo	3	0
	Francisco Jardón	March 29, 1911	37		(Spain) Club de Campo	3	0
	Luis Pratsmasó	March 30, 1916	32		(Spain) Junior	2	1
	Manuel Royes					2	0
	Rafael Ruiz	December 10, 1916	31			3	0
	Enrique Sáinz	August 19, 1917	30		(Spain) Club de Campo	3	0

== Switzerland ==
Head coach:

Pos.	Player	DoB	Age	Caps	Club	Tournament games	Tournament goals
	Armand Schlée				(Switzerland) Black Boys HC, Geneva	1	0
	Emil Grub				(Switzerland) Red Sox Hockey Club, Zürich	1	0
	Edouard Siegrist				(Switzerland) Black Boys HC, Geneva	3	0
	Fritz Kehrer				(Switzerland) Red Sox Hockey Club, Zürich	3	0
	Fridolin Kurmann	December 12, 1912	35		(Switzerland) Red Sox Hockey Club, Zürich	3	0
	Fritz Stühlinger	January 21, 1924	24		(Switzerland) Basler Hockey Club, Basel	2	0
	Hugo Walser				(Switzerland) HC Olten, Olten	1	0
	Jean Gruner	October 10, 1916	31			1	0
	Josef Rippstein	August 16, 1916	31		(Switzerland) HC Olten, Olten	2	0
	Jean-Pierre Roche	April 10, 1924	24		(Switzerland) Lausanne HC	2	0
	Karl Vogt				(Switzerland) HC Olten, Olten	3	0
	Manuel Royes				(Switzerland) HC Olten, Olten	2	0
	Otto Grolimund				(Switzerland) HC Olten, Olten	2	1
	Pierre Pasche				(Switzerland) Black Boys HC, Geneva	2	1
	Roland Jenzer				(Switzerland) Basler Hockey Club, Basel	2	0
	Robert Eger				(Switzerland) HC Olten, Olten	3	0

== United States ==
Head coach: Henry Goode as playing manager and Kurt Orban as playing coach

No.	Pos.	Player	DoB	Age	Caps	Club	Tournament games	Tournament goals
	HB	Donald Buck	September 26, 1916	31	?	(United States) Mt. Washington Club	2	0
		David Cauffman	October 29, 1916				0	0
	FW	Claus Gerson	November 12, 1917	30	?	(United States) New York Tennis and Hockey Club	3	0
	FW	Henry Goode	June 7, 1918	30	?		1	0
	FW	Frederick Hewitt	September 16, 1916	31	?	(United States) Mt. Washington Club	2	1
	HB	William Kurtz	December 18, 1917	30	?	(United States) Philadelphia Field Hockey Association	2	0
	HB	Hendrick Lubbers	December 30, 1926	21	?		3	0
	FW	Harry Marcoplos	January 28, 1926	22	?	(United States) Baltimore Field Hockey Club	3	0
	FW	Kurt Orban	August 6, 1916	31	?	(United States) Downtown Athletic Club	3	0
	B	John Renwick	May 13, 1921	27	?	(United States) Rye Field Hockey Club	3	0
		Phillip Schoettle			?		0	0
	HB	Sanders Sims	June 1, 1921	26	?	(United States) Philadelphia Hockey and Tennis Club	1	0
	GK	John Slade	May 30, 1908	40	?	(United States) Westchester Field Hockey Club	2	0
	B	Walter Stude	December 3, 1913	34	?	(United States) Baltimore Field Hockey Club	3	0
	FW/HB/GK	Felix Ucko	January 4, 1919	32	?	(United States) New York Field Hockey Club	3	0
	FW	William Wilson	October 26, 1917	30	?	(United States) Westchester Field Hockey Club	2	0

Felix Ucko played in every match a different position.

== Position glossary ==
- GK=Goalkeeper
- B=Back
- HB=Halfback
- FW=Forward
- FB=Fullback
- CH=Centrehalf
- CM=CentreMidfield
