= List of Pakistan international field hockey players =

Note: This is a list of men's international field hockey players from Pakistan

The Pakistan national field hockey team represents Pakistan in international field hockey. It is administered and fielded by the Pakistan Hockey Federation (PHF), the governing body of the sport in the country. It competes as a member of the Asian Hockey Federation (AHF) and the Federation of International Hockey (FIH). Pakistan competed in their first international match on 2 August 1948, in a 2–1 victory over Belgium at the 1948 London Olympics.

== List of players ==
Pakistan has competed in numerous competitions since 1948 and all players that have made an appearance for the team are listed below with their playing details, number of caps, goals, playing position, career span and any honors won as a part of the national team squad. Statistics of total appearances and goals are referenced correctly up to matches played on 12 October 2002 by the official record of PHF found here . The records after that time period may have inadvertent errors.

GK	Goalkeeper
DF	Defender
MF	Midfielder
FW	Forward
1st place, gold medalist(s)	Tournament winners
2nd place, silver medalist(s)	Tournament runner-up
3rd place, bronze medalist(s)	Tournament third place
(C)	Captain
§	Active with national team

== 1948–1959 ==
Pos.	Player	Debut	Caps	Goals	Olympics	Asian Games
DF	Munir Dar (C)	1956	92	41	2nd place, silver medalist(s) 1st place, gold medalist(s)	1st place, gold medalist(s) 2nd place, silver medalist(s)
MF	Anwar Ahmed Khan (C)	1956	90	1	2nd place, silver medalist(s) 1st place, gold medalist(s)	1st place, gold medalist(s)
GK	Zakir Hussain	1954	84	0	2nd place, silver medalist(s) 1st place, gold medalist(s)	1st place, gold medalist(s)
FW	Motiullah Khan	1956	68	13	2nd place, silver medalist(s) 1st place, gold medalist(s)	1st place, gold medalist(s)
FW	Khawaja Zakauddin	1958	56	26	1st place, gold medalist(s) 2nd place, silver medalist(s)	1st place, gold medalist(s) 2nd place, silver medalist(s)
FW	Abdul Hamid Hamidi (C)	1948	55	48	2nd place, silver medalist(s) 1st place, gold medalist(s)	1st place, gold medalist(s)
DF	Manzoor Hussain Atif (C)	1952	54	19	2nd place, silver medalist(s) 1st place, gold medalist(s)	1st place, gold medalist(s)
MF	Ch. Ghulam Rasool (C)	1956	49	0	2nd place, silver medalist(s) 1st place, gold medalist(s)	1st place, gold medalist(s)
MF	Habib Ali Kiddie	1950	48	2	2nd place, silver medalist(s) 1st place, gold medalist(s)	1st place, gold medalist(s)
FW	Naseer Bunda	1954	44	43	2nd place, silver medalist(s) 1st place, gold medalist(s)	1st place, gold medalist(s)
FW	Noor Alam	1956	42	8	2nd place, silver medalist(s) 1st place, gold medalist(s)	1st place, gold medalist(s)
FW	Latifur Rehman	1950	24	0	2nd place, silver medalist(s)	1st place, gold medalist(s)
FW	Aziz Malik	1948	23	28
FW	Habibur Rehman	1952	23	21	2nd place, silver medalist(s)	1st place, gold medalist(s)
DF	Niaz Khan (C)	1948	21	4

Pos.	Player	Debut	Caps	Goals	Olympics	Asian Games
FW	Muhammad Afzal Manna	1958	19	12	2nd place, silver medalist(s)	1st place, gold medalist(s)
FW	Mahmmod-ul Hassan	1948	17	9
MF	Hamidullah Burki (C)	1948	16	0
DF	Khursheed Aslam	1958	14	0	1st place, gold medalist(s)	1st place, gold medalist(s)
DF	Akhtar Hussain	1950	12	1	2nd place, silver medalist(s)
FW	Ali Iqtidar Shah Dara (C)	1948	11	9
DF	Asghar Ali Khan	1950	10	1
MF	Abdul Ghafoor Khan	1948	10	2
FW	Latif Mir	1950	9	10
MF	Qazi Massarrat Hussain	1956	8	0	2nd place, silver medalist(s)	1st place, gold medalist(s)
MF	Jack Britto	1952	8	0
GK	Fazalur Rehman	1950	8	0
MF	Muhammad Shahrukh	1948	8	0
GK	Syed Muhammad Salim	1948	7	0
DF	Muhammad Khurram	1948	7	0
MF	Khawaja Muhammad Taqi	1948	7	0
FW	Abdul Qayyum Khan	1948	7	0
MF	Aziz Naik	1954	6	1
FW	Zafar Ali Zafari	1954	6	0
GK	Qazi Abdul Waheed	1952	6	0		1st place, gold medalist(s)
DF	Abdul Razzaq	1948	6	1
MF	Khurshid Zaman	1954	5	0
FW	Muhammad Sadiq	1954	4	0
MF	Safdar Ali Babul	1952	4	0
MF	Muhammad Naseeb	1950	4	0
FW	Salimullah	1950	4	1
GK	Anwar Baig	1948	4	0
FW	Azizur Rehman	1948	4	3
FW	Masood Ahmed Khan	1948	4	1
MF	Muhammad Rafiq	1952	3	0
MF	Khawaja Muhammad Aslam	1952	3	0
GK	Abdul Rashid Dixon	1950	3	0
MF	Milton D'Mello	1948	3	0
FW	Sheikh Rehmatullah	1948	3	0
DF	Manzoor Bajwa	1958	2	0
FW	Muhammad Hafeez	1958	2	2		1st place, gold medalist(s)
FW	Syed Azmat Ali	1952	2	0		1st place, gold medalist(s)
FW	Masood Mirza	1950	2	0
MF	Mukhtar Bhatti	1948	2	0
FW	Muhammad Amin	1956	1	0

== 1960–1969 ==
Pos.	Player	Debut	Caps	Goals	Olympics	Asian Games	World Cup
FW	Khalid Mahmood (C)	1963	130	19	1st place, gold medalist(s) 2nd place, silver medalist(s)	1st place, gold medalist(s) 2nd place, silver medalist(s)	1st place, gold medalist(s)
FW	Muhammad Asad Malik (C)	1961	121	41	2nd place, silver medalist(s) 1st place, gold medalist(s)	1st place, gold medalist(s) 2nd place, silver medalist(s)	1st place, gold medalist(s)
MF	Saeed Anwar	1964	112	10	2nd place, silver medalist(s) 1st place, gold medalist(s)	2nd place, silver medalist(s) 1st place, gold medalist(s)
FW	Islahuddin Siddiquee (C)	1967	93	37	2nd place, silver medalist(s) 3rd place, bronze medalist(s)	1st place, gold medalist(s)	1st place, gold medalist(s) 2nd place, silver medalist(s)
GK	Saleem Sherwani (C)	1969	91	0	2nd place, silver medalist(s) 3rd place, bronze medalist(s)	1st place, gold medalist(s)	1st place, gold medalist(s) 2nd place, silver medalist(s)
FW	Abdul Rashid Jr. (C)	1968	89	96	1st place, gold medalist(s) 2nd place, silver medalist(s) 3rd place, bronze medalist(s)	1st place, gold medalist(s)	1st place, gold medalist(s)
FW	Tanvir Dar	1966	80	43	1st place, gold medalist(s)	1st place, gold medalist(s)	1st place, gold medalist(s)
FW	Tariq Niazi	1961	76	50	2nd place, silver medalist(s) 1st place, gold medalist(s)	1st place, gold medalist(s) 2nd place, silver medalist(s)
FW	Jahangir Butt	1965	72	10	1st place, gold medalist(s) 2nd place, silver medalist(s)	2nd place, silver medalist(s) 1st place, gold medalist(s)	1st place, gold medalist(s)
FW	Shahnaz Sheikh	1969	68	45	2nd place, silver medalist(s) 3rd place, bronze medalist(s)	1st place, gold medalist(s)	1st place, gold medalist(s) 2nd place, silver medalist(s)
MF	Fazalur Rehman	1965	62	2	2nd place, silver medalist(s)	2nd place, silver medalist(s) 1st place, gold medalist(s)	1st place, gold medalist(s)
DF	Tariq Aziz (C)	1961	61	0	2nd place, silver medalist(s) 1st place, gold medalist(s)	1st place, gold medalist(s) 2nd place, silver medalist(s)
MF	Muhammad Rashid	1962	61	0	2nd place, silver medalist(s)	2nd place, silver medalist(s)
MF	Gulraiz Akhtar	1966	60	2	1st place, gold medalist(s)	1st place, gold medalist(s)
FW	Abdul Waheed Khan	1960	56	52	1st place, gold medalist(s)	1st place, gold medalist(s) 2nd place, silver medalist(s)
MF	Riaz Ahmed	1966	55	2	1st place, gold medalist(s) 2nd place, silver medalist(s)	1st place, gold medalist(s)	1st place, gold medalist(s)
DF	Riazuddin Mughal	1965	55	5	1st place, gold medalist(s)	2nd place, silver medalist(s) 1st place, gold medalist(s)
FW	Muhammad Ashfaq	1966	49	11	1st place, gold medalist(s)	2nd place, silver medalist(s) 1st place, gold medalist(s)	1st place, gold medalist(s)
FW	Laeeq Ahmed	1965	47	18		2nd place, silver medalist(s)
FW	Zahid Sheikh	1969	34	8	2nd place, silver medalist(s)	1st place, gold medalist(s)	2nd place, silver medalist(s)
MF	Zafar Hayat	1960	25	1	2nd place, silver medalist(s)	1st place, gold medalist(s)
GK	Abdul Hamid Jr.	1963	22	0	2nd place, silver medalist(s)	2nd place, silver medalist(s)
DF	Akhtar-ul Islam	1969	21	3	2nd place, silver medalist(s)	1st place, gold medalist(s)	1st place, gold medalist(s)
FW	Mudassar Asghar	1967	21	5	2nd place, silver medalist(s) 3rd place, bronze medalist(s)

Pos.	Player	Debut	Caps	Goals	Olympics	Asian Games	World Cup
GK	Anwar Zafar	1965	18	0
GK	Munir Pervez	1969	17	0
DF	Arshad Mahmood	1969	15	3	3rd place, bronze medalist(s)		2nd place, silver medalist(s)
MF	Sami Khan	1965	15	0		1st place, gold medalist(s)
FW	Nawaz Khizar Bajwa	1963	14	0	2nd place, silver medalist(s)	2nd place, silver medalist(s)
MF	Qayyum Niazi	1969	13	0		1st place, gold medalist(s)
GK	Lala Abdul Rashid	1960	12	0	1st place, gold medalist(s)
FW	Khurshid Azam	1964	11	4	2nd place, silver medalist(s)
FW	Hayat Muhammad	1961	11	4
GK	Qazi Salahuddin	1967	10	0
FW	Saeed Kashani	1967	10	0
GK	Jahangir Khan	1966	8	0		2nd place, silver medalist(s)
DF	Bashir Ahmed	1960	8	1	1st place, gold medalist(s)	1st place, gold medalist(s)
MF	Anwar Shah	1966	7	0
GK	Mazhar Hussain	1961	6	0		1st place, gold medalist(s)
GK	Muhammad Aslam	1969	5	0			1st place, gold medalist(s)
DF	Qamar Ali Khan	1961	5	0
FW	Iftikhar Shah	1962	4	0
FW	Amanullah	1967	4	0
GK	Qamar Riaz-ul Haq	1965	3	0
MF	Muhammad Akhtar	1965	3	0		2nd place, silver medalist(s)
MF	Pervez Mitho	1963	3	0
MF	Marghoob Ansari	1962	3	0
FW	Farooq Khan	1962	3	0
MF	Zafar Ahmed Khan	1961	3	0
MF	Abdus Sadeque	1969	2	0
FW	Sabir Malik	1967	2	0
DF	Afzal Baig	1965	2	0
MF	Bashir Ahmed Chaudhry	1961	2	0
GK	Rony Gardner	1960	2	0
FW	Bashir Ahmed	1962	2	0
FW	Mushtaq Ahmed	1960	2	0	1st place, gold medalist(s)
DF	Sajjad Ali	1969	1	0
FW	Muhammad Younus	1969	1	0
FW	Rashid Malik	1969	1	0
FW	Altaf Sabir	1969	1	0
GK	Abdul Hadi	1967	1	0
DF	Amjad Lodhi	1967	1	0
MF	Muhammad Dilawar	1967	1	0
FW	Muhammad Ismail	1967	1	0
DF	Muhammad Aslam Rodha	1966	1	0

== 1970–1979 ==
Pos.	Player	Debut	Caps	Goals	Olympics	Asian Games	World Cup
MF	Abdul Rashid-ul Hassan (C)	1979	199	9	1st place, gold medalist(s)	1st place, gold medalist(s) 2nd place, silver medalist(s)	1st place, gold medalist(s)
FW	Hanif Khan	1976	177	127	3rd place, bronze medalist(s) 1st place, gold medalist(s)	1st place, gold medalist(s)	1st place, gold medalist(s)
FW	Kaleemullah Khan (C)	1979	176	97	1st place, gold medalist(s)	1st place, gold medalist(s) 2nd place, silver medalist(s)	1st place, gold medalist(s)
FW	Manzoor Hussain	1975	175	86	3rd place, bronze medalist(s) 1st place, gold medalist(s)	1st place, gold medalist(s)	2nd place, silver medalist(s) 1st place, gold medalist(s)
FW	Samiullah Khan (C)	1971	155	55	3rd place, bronze medalist(s)	1st place, gold medalist(s)	2nd place, silver medalist(s) 1st place, gold medalist(s)
DF	Manzoor-ul Hassan (C)	1973	154	101	3rd place, bronze medalist(s)	1st place, gold medalist(s)	2nd place, silver medalist(s) 1st place, gold medalist(s)
FW	Hassan Sardar (C)	1979	148	150	1st place, gold medalist(s)	1st place, gold medalist(s)	1st place, gold medalist(s)
MF	Akhtar Rasool (C)	1971	146	22	2nd place, silver medalist(s) 3rd place, bronze medalist(s)	1st place, gold medalist(s)	1st place, gold medalist(s) 2nd place, silver medalist(s)
DF	Munawwar-uz Zaman (C)	1971	119	44	2nd place, silver medalist(s) 3rd place, bronze medalist(s)	1st place, gold medalist(s)	1st place, gold medalist(s) 2nd place, silver medalist(s)
FW	Saeed Khan	1974	72	38		1st place, gold medalist(s)	2nd place, silver medalist(s) 1st place, gold medalist(s)
FW	Safdar Abbas	1973	56	22			2nd place, silver medalist(s)
FW	Mushtaq Ahmed	1979	53	17	1st place, gold medalist(s)	1st place, gold medalist(s)
MF	Iftikhar Ahmed Syed	1971	49	0	2nd place, silver medalist(s) 3rd place, bronze medalist(s)	1st place, gold medalist(s)	2nd place, silver medalist(s)
GK	Qamar Zia	1975	45	0	3rd place, bronze medalist(s)	1st place, gold medalist(s)	1st place, gold medalist(s)
MF	Muhammad Rashid	1976	44	0		1st place, gold medalist(s)
FW	Muhammad Azam	1973	38	8		1st place, gold medalist(s)	2nd place, silver medalist(s)
MF	Muhammad Shafiq	1978	33	0		1st place, gold medalist(s)	1st place, gold medalist(s)
MF	Arshad Ali Chaudhry	1971	33	0	3rd place, bronze medalist(s)	1st place, gold medalist(s)	1st place, gold medalist(s) 2nd place, silver medalist(s)
DF	Rana Ehsanullah	1978	32	6		1st place, gold medalist(s)	1st place, gold medalist(s)
MF	Saleem Nazim	1974	22	1	3rd place, bronze medalist(s)		2nd place, silver medalist(s)
MF	Saeed Ahmed Khan	1978	20	0		1st place, gold medalist(s)	1st place, gold medalist(s)

Pos.	Player	Debut	Caps	Goals	Olympics	Asian Games	World Cup
MF	Shahid Ali Khan	1973	19	0
FW	Nasim Mirza	1975	18	2		1st place, gold medalist(s)	1st place, gold medalist(s)
MF	Munir Bhatti	1978	13	0		1st place, gold medalist(s)	1st place, gold medalist(s)
FW	Hidayatullah Khan	1973	9	1		1st place, gold medalist(s)
MF	Jamshed Sultan	1975	8	0
DF	Muhammad Iqbal Bali	1973	6	0
MF	Salim Ahmed	1979	5	0
FW	Abdaal Ismail	1973	5	0
GK	Masood ur Rehman	1973	3	0
FW	Nasir Khan	1979	2	0
FW	Umar Farooq	1972	2	0
DF	Jamil Ahmed Khan	1978	1	0
FW	Pervez Kiyani	1976	1	0
MF	Musheer Rabani	1976	1	0
FW	Farooq Akhtar	1975	1	0
GK	Shamim Ilyas	1974	1	0		1st place, gold medalist(s)	2nd place, silver medalist(s)
FW	Shafaat Baghdadi	1970	1	0

== 1980–1989 ==
Pos.	Player	Debut	Caps	Goals	Olympics	Asian Games	World Cup
FW	Shahbaz Ahmed (C)	1986	304	101	3rd place, bronze medalist(s)	2nd place, silver medalist(s) 1st place, gold medalist(s) 3rd place, bronze medalist(s)	2nd place, silver medalist(s) 1st place, gold medalist(s)
FW	Tahir Zaman (C)	1987	252	134	3rd place, bronze medalist(s)	1st place, gold medalist(s) 3rd place, bronze medalist(s)	2nd place, silver medalist(s) 1st place, gold medalist(s)
GK	Mansoor Ahmed (C)	1986	238	0	3rd place, bronze medalist(s)	2nd place, silver medalist(s) 1st place, gold medalist(s) 3rd place, bronze medalist(s)	2nd place, silver medalist(s) 1st place, gold medalist(s)
FW	Waseem Feroz	1984	197	55	3rd place, bronze medalist(s)	2nd place, silver medalist(s) 1st place, gold medalist(s)	2nd place, silver medalist(s) 1st place, gold medalist(s)
MF	Khawaja Junaid	1987	171	6	3rd place, bronze medalist(s)	1st place, gold medalist(s) 3rd place, bronze medalist(s)	2nd place, silver medalist(s) 1st place, gold medalist(s)
DF	Rana Mujahid Ali	1987	158	14	3rd place, bronze medalist(s)	1st place, gold medalist(s)	2nd place, silver medalist(s) 1st place, gold medalist(s)
DF	Nasir Ali (C)	1981	150	19	1st place, gold medalist(s)	1st place, gold medalist(s) 2nd place, silver medalist(s)	1st place, gold medalist(s)
DF	Khalid Bashir	1987	143	66	3rd place, bronze medalist(s)	1st place, gold medalist(s)	2nd place, silver medalist(s)
DF	Qasim Zia	1981	125	15	1st place, gold medalist(s)	1st place, gold medalist(s) 2nd place, silver medalist(s)	1st place, gold medalist(s)
DF	Amjad Mahmood	1981	125	5	1st place, gold medalist(s)	1st place, gold medalist(s) 2nd place, silver medalist(s)	1st place, gold medalist(s)
DF	Qazi Mohib (C)	1986	123	41		3rd place, bronze medalist(s) 1st place, gold medalist(s)	2nd place, silver medalist(s)
GK	Shahid Ali Khan	1981	135	0	1st place, gold medalist(s) 3rd place, bronze medalist(s)	1st place, gold medalist(s)	1st place, gold medalist(s) 2nd place, silver medalist(s)
MF	Ishtiaq Ahmad	1981	134	9	1st place, gold medalist(s)	1st place, gold medalist(s) 2nd place, silver medalist(s)	1st place, gold medalist(s)
FW	Farhat Hassan Khan	1985	129	26	3rd place, bronze medalist(s)	2nd place, silver medalist(s) 1st place, gold medalist(s)	2nd place, silver medalist(s)
MF	Naeem Akhtar	1982	113	2	1st place, gold medalist(s)
MF	Ayaz Mahmood	1982	110	8	1st place, gold medalist(s)	2nd place, silver medalist(s)
FW	Qamar Ibrahim	1987	100	34	3rd place, bronze medalist(s)	1st place, gold medalist(s)	2nd place, silver medalist(s)
GK	Syed Ghulam Moinuddin	1980	100	0	1st place, gold medalist(s)	2nd place, silver medalist(s)	1st place, gold medalist(s)
FW	Musaddiq Hussain	1987	95	31	3rd place, bronze medalist(s)	1st place, gold medalist(s)
MF	Anjum Saeed	1987	94	10	3rd place, bronze medalist(s)	1st place, gold medalist(s)	2nd place, silver medalist(s)
FW	Qasim Khan	1984	88	22
FW	Saleem Sherwani	1981	69	8	1st place, gold medalist(s)	2nd place, silver medalist(s)	1st place, gold medalist(s)
FW	Zahid Sharif	1987	63	24		1st place, gold medalist(s)	2nd place, silver medalist(s)
FW	Khalid Hameed	1981	53	4	1st place, gold medalist(s)
MF	Naeem Amjad	1987	49	1			2nd place, silver medalist(s)
FW	Muhammad Irfan	1987	47	35		1st place, gold medalist(s)
FW	Tariq Sheikh	1986	44	23			2nd place, silver medalist(s)
FW	Maqsood Hussain	1983	38	2
MF	Muhammad Saeed Ahmed	1981	37	1		1st place, gold medalist(s)	1st place, gold medalist(s)
MF	Shahid-ul Islam	1986	35	0		2nd place, silver medalist(s)
DF	Tauqeer Dar	1983	30	14	1st place, gold medalist(s)
MF	Amir Zafar	1987	29	0
MF	Mubashar Sheikh	1986	30	70
FW	Mahmood Hussain	1984	28	7
FW	Sanaullah	1981	25	1
GK	Rizwan Munir	1987	24	0
FW	Iftikhar Riaz Ahmed	1986	22	7		2nd place, silver medalist(s)

Pos.	Player	Debut	Caps	Goals	Olympics	Asian Games	World Cup
DF	Abdul Rashid	1984	18	7
FW	Mumtaz Haider	1983	17	9
FW	Arif Bhopali	1989	16	5			2nd place, silver medalist(s)
DF	Nasir Naseer	1981	16	3
FW	Ajmal Khan	1985	11	0
FW	Qaiser Iqbal	1980	11	5
FW	Jan Muhammad	1980	8	3
FW	Pervez Iqbal	1986	7	1
FW	Naeem Tahir	1981	6	6
GK	Arshad Hussain	1989	5	0
MF	Arshad Qureshi	1989	4	0
FW	Ziauddin Ahmed	1986	4	0		2nd place, silver medalist(s)
DF	Amir Shafiq	1982	4	0
GK	Muhammad Anwar	1984	3	0
FW	Asif Naseer	1981	3	0
GK	Abdul Rauf	1981	3	0
DF	Muhammad Ashghar	1980	3	1
FW	Khalid Paracha	1987	2	0
FW	Tahir Saleem	1986	1	0
DF	Zahid Iqbal	1984	1	0
MF	Zahid Pirzada	1982	1	0

== 1990–1999 ==
Pos.	Player	Debut	Caps	Goals	Olympics	Asian Games	World Cup
MF	Waseem Ahmad (C)	1996	410	10		3rd place, bronze medalist(s) 1st place, gold medalist(s)
DF	Sohail Abbas (C)	1998	311	348		3rd place, bronze medalist(s) 1st place, gold medalist(s)
MF	Muhammad Saqlain (C)	1999	233	32
MF	Muhammad Usman (C)	1994	210	7		3rd place, bronze medalist(s)	1st place, gold medalist(s)
FW	Muhammad Sarwar (C)	1995	196	44		3rd place, bronze medalist(s)
FW	Muhammad Nadeem (C)	1994	192	49		3rd place, bronze medalist(s)
FW	Waseem Sarwar	1999	2	6
FW	Kashif Jawad	1999	180	86
FW	Muhammad Shahbaz	1991	168	89	3rd place, bronze medalist(s)	3rd place, bronze medalist(s)	1st place, gold medalist(s)
FW	Kamran Ashraf	1993	166	129		3rd place, bronze medalist(s)	1st place, gold medalist(s)
GK	Ahmed Alam (C)	1991	154	0		3rd place, bronze medalist(s)	1st place, gold medalist(s)
FW	Atif Bashir (C)	1995	118	59		3rd place, bronze medalist(s)
DF	Ali Raza	1996	139	14
DF	Tariq Imran	1996	128	1		3rd place, bronze medalist(s)
DF	Danish Kaleem	1994	117	18		3rd place, bronze medalist(s)	1st place, gold medalist(s)
DF	Zia Ud Din Khan	1997	6	0
FW	Rahim Khan	1993	107	22		3rd place, bronze medalist(s)	1st place, gold medalist(s)
MF	Irfan Mahmood	1992	106	0		3rd place, bronze medalist(s)	1st place, gold medalist(s)
MF	Muhammad Khalid	1991	96	3	3rd place, bronze medalist(s)
MF	Shafqat Malik	1993	92	3		3rd place, bronze medalist(s)	1st place, gold medalist(s)
DF	Naveed Alam	1993	92	11		3rd place, bronze medalist(s)	1st place, gold medalist(s)
FW	Anis Ahmed	1994	87	24		3rd place, bronze medalist(s)
FW	Asif Bajwa	1992	74	25	3rd place, bronze medalist(s)	3rd place, bronze medalist(s)	1st place, gold medalist(s)
GK	Muhammad Qasim	1998	68	0		3rd place, bronze medalist(s)
MF	Imran Yousuf	1998	66	12		3rd place, bronze medalist(s)
FW	Haider Hussain	1998	49	9		3rd place, bronze medalist(s)
FW	Naveed Iqbal	1998	47	10		3rd place, bronze medalist(s)
MF	Irfan Yousuf	1997	46	0		3rd place, bronze medalist(s)
FW	Muhammad Ali Khan	1993	38	5
FW	Babar Abdullah	1996	36	4		3rd place, bronze medalist(s)
DF	Amir Saleem	1998	34	0		3rd place, bronze medalist(s)
FW	Aleem Raza	1995	33	8
DF	Akhlaq Ahmad	1990	32	0	3rd place, bronze medalist(s)
FW	Muhammad Khalid	1996	30	10
FW	Muhammad Irfan	1999	25	3
FW	Ejaz Ahmed	1991	23	5
FW	Asif Ahmed	1994	20	3		3rd place, bronze medalist(s)
DF	Shamim Pal	1993	20	1

Pos.	Player	Debut	Caps	Goals	Olympics	Asian Games	World Cup
FW	Naveed Asim	1999	15	4
MF	Asad Qureshi	1998	15	0		3rd place, bronze medalist(s)
FW	Akmal Sikander	1993	13	1
FW	Ehsan Muhammad Khan	1993	12	1
MF	Mubashir Akhtar	1999	10	0
GK	Ejaz Kokhar	1996	9	0
GK	Khalid Mahmood	1995	9	0
DF	Faisal Ali	1994	6	0		3rd place, bronze medalist(s)
MF	Laeeq Ahmed Lashari	1991	6	0
DF	Muhammad Atiq	1995	5	0
FW	Ejaz Rasool	1999	4	0
MF	Fayyaz Ahmed	1995	4	0
MF	Muhammad Riasat	1990	4	0		1st place, gold medalist(s)
GK	Qadeer Bashir	1999	3	0
FW	Muhammad Farooq	1998	3	0
MF	Wahid Shahid	1995	3	0
FW	Shahid Hussain	1991	2	0
MF	Zaka Ashraf	1991	2	0
MF	Shahzad Ahmed	1990	2	0

== 2000–2009 ==
Pos.	Player	Debut	Caps	Goals	Olympics	Asian Games	World Cup
FW	Shakeel Abbasi (C)	2003	309	103		3rd place, bronze medalist(s) 1st place, gold medalist(s) 2nd place, silver medalist(s)	
DF	Muhammad Imran (C)	2004	289	106		3rd place, bronze medalist(s) 1st place, gold medalist(s) 2nd place, silver medalist(s)	
FW	Rehan Butt (C)	2002	274	110		3rd place, bronze medalist(s) 1st place, gold medalist(s)	
DF	Zeeshan Ashraf (C)	2001	235	3		3rd place, bronze medalist(s) 1st place, gold medalist(s)	
FW	Muhammad Waqas Sharif (C)	2005	216	60		3rd place, bronze medalist(s) 1st place, gold medalist(s) 2nd place, silver medalist(s)	
FW	Muhammad Umar Bhutta^{§}(C)	2009	202	35		2nd place, silver medalist(s)	
FW	Shafqat Rasool	2008	194	25		1st place, gold medalist(s) 2nd place, silver medalist(s)	
GK	Salman Akbar (C)	2002	193	0		3rd place, bronze medalist(s) 1st place, gold medalist(s)	
DF	Muhammad Irfan Sr. (C)	2008	191	28		1st place, gold medalist(s) 2nd place, silver medalist(s)	
FW	Muhammad Rizwan Sr. (C)	2009	184	43		1st place, gold medalist(s) 2nd place, silver medalist(s)	
MF	Fareed Ahmed	2008	176	3		1st place, gold medalist(s) 2nd place, silver medalist(s)	
FW	Abdul Haseem Khan (C)	2009	171	70		1st place, gold medalist(s) 2nd place, silver medalist(s)	
FW	Shabbir Hussain	2000	165	20			
FW	Muhammad Zubair	2006	159	22		3rd place, bronze medalist(s) 1st place, gold medalist(s)	
MF	Rashid Mehmmod	2009	157	4		1st place, gold medalist(s) 2nd place, silver medalist(s)	
MF	Ghazanfar Ali (C)	2001	150	16			
MF	Dilawar Hussain	2001	140	2			
MF	Adnan Maqsood	2003	118	6		3rd place, bronze medalist(s)	
FW	Akhtar Ali	2003	101	18			
FW	Tariq Aziz	2003	98	13		3rd place, bronze medalist(s)	
FW	Abbas Haider Bilgrami	2007	70	8			
MF	Imran Khan Yusufzai	2004	62	2		3rd place, bronze medalist(s)	
FW	Waqas Akbar	2006	58	3			
MF	Adnan Zakir	2004	52	6			
GK	Nasir Ahmed	2003	50			3rd place, bronze medalist(s)	
FW	Muhammad Kashif Ali	2007	48	4			
DF	Syed Imran Ali Warsi	2003	48	9		3rd place, bronze medalist(s)	
FW	Sajjad Anwar	2005	42	0		3rd place, bronze medalist(s)	
DF	Ehsanullah Khan	2005	40	6		3rd place, bronze medalist(s)	
DF	Amir Shahzad	2009	33	1			
FW	Shabbir Ahmed Khan	2006	32	2			
FW	Muddasir Abbas	2006	42	38			
FW	Khalid Saleem	2003	28	9			
MF	Muhammad Rana Asif	2003	28	0			
DF	Muhammad Atiq	2008	27	3			
MF	Muhammad Kashif Javed	2008	23	1			
FW	Sameer Hussain	2000	21	3			

Pos.	Player	Debut	Caps	Goals	Olympics	Asian Games	World Cup
FW	Muhamamd Arshad Ahmed	2007	17	4
MF	Waqas Zafar	2007	15	0
DF	Muhammad Kamran Ahmed	2007	15	0
MF	Zeeshan Ali	2003	13	0
FW	Yasir Islam	2005	10	1
FW	Shabbir Khan	2007	7	0
MF	Muhammad Mudassar	2007	6	0
MF	Sibtain Raza	2009	5	0
DF	Majid Khan	2007	5	0
FW	Abdul Asim Khan	2004	5	0
FW	Muhammad Inayatullah	2007	4	0
FW	Mudassar Khan	2006	4	0		3rd place, bronze medalist(s)
MF	Nasir Mahmood	2005	4	2
MF	Imran Rasool	2003	4	0
FW	Muhammad Afzal	2007	3	0
FW	Kashif Yaqoob	2005	3	0
FW	Muhammad Aqil Khan	2003	3	1
MF	Sumair Saleem	2003	3	2
FW	Muhammad Amin	2007	2	0
FW	Ishtiaq Ahmed	2007	2	0
FW	Rashid Imran	2006	2	0		3rd place, bronze medalist(s)
FW	Muhammad Khalid	2005	2	0
FW	Muhammad Asim	2003	2	0
FW	Zahid Shiekh	2003	1	0
FW	Muhammad Mudassar	2003	1	0
FW	Mukhtar Ahmed	2003	1	0
FW	Shafiq-ul Islam	2003	1	0
MF	Shahid Wasim	2003	1	0

== 2010–2019 ==
Pos.	Player	Debut	Caps	Goals	Olympics	Asian Games	World Cup
MF	Muhammad Tousiq	2010	178	27		1st place, gold medalist(s)
MF	Zubair Ahmed	2010	187	72		Asian Gold medal, SAG Gold Medal, Youth Olympic Silver Medal
FW	Ali Shan^{§}	2011	163	17
MF	Muhammad Rizwan Ali	2011	141	10
MF	Ammad Shakeel Butt^{§}(C)	2013	113	5		2nd place, silver medalist(s)
GK	Imran Butt	2010	111	0		2nd place, silver medalist(s)
MF	Tasawar Abbas	2013	95	1
FW	Arsalan Qadir	2013	79	21
DF	Syed Kashif Shah	2011	78	2		2nd place, silver medalist(s)
FW	Ajaz Ahmed^{§}	2016	75	16
MF	Abu Mahmood	2017	73	18
FW	Muhammad Dilber	2013	71	17		2nd place, silver medalist(s)
FW	Muhammad Irfan Jr.	2011	70	13
GK	Imran Shah	2010	59	0
DF	Muhammad Aleem Bilal	2016	53	17
MF	Muhammad Azfar Yaqoob^{§}	2015	53	2
MF	Faisal Qadir	2013	49	0
DF	Mubashir Ali^{§}	2017	46	17
FW	Muhammad Atiq Arshad	2012	43	12
GK	Amjad Ali^{§}	2014	37	0	MF	Zubair Ahmed^{§}	2017	46	57
DF	Muhammad Atif Mushtaq	2017	34	0
DF	Nawaz Ashfaq	2015	26	0
GK	Mazhar Abbas^{§}	2015	24	0
MF	Tanzeem-ul Hassan^{§}	2017	20	0
FW	Salman Hussain	2012	20	3

Pos.	Player	Debut	Caps	Goals	Olympics	Asian Games	World Cup
FW	Umair Sarfaraz	2017	16	0
FW	Rizwan Ali	2015	15	2
MF	Zohaib Ashraf	2014	14	0
FW	Junaid Manzoor^{§}	2018	13	3
DF	Khalid Mehmood Bhatti	2012	12	0
FW	Rana Abdul Waheed^{§}	2019	43	20
FW	Ali Ghazanfar^{§}	2019	10	2
MF	Moin Shakeel^{§}	2019	10	1
FW	Rana Sohail Riaz	2018	9	0
MF	Shahjeeh Ahmed Saeed	2017	9	1
FW	Muhammad Bilal Qadir	2017	4	0
FW	Khizar Akhtar	2017	4	0
FW	Shan Irshad	2017	4	0
DF	Hassan Anwar	2017	4	0
FW	Awais-ur Rehman	2016	4	2
MF	Taimoor Malik	2016	4	0
FW	Kashif Butt	2012	4	0
FW	Muhammad Kashif	2010	2	0
FW	Amjad Ali Khan	2019	1	0
MF	Muhammad Suleiman	2013	1	0
FW	Abdul Qayyum Dogar	2010	1	0

== 2020–present ==
Pos.	Player	Debut	Caps	Goals	Olympics	Asian Games	World Cup
FW	Mohsin Ali ^{§}	2021	6	4
FW	Ahmed Nadeem^{§}	2021	6	2
FW	Muhammad Salman Razzaq^{§}	2021	6	1
DF	Muhammad Abdullah^{§}	2021	6	0
MF	Hamad-ud Din Anjum^{§}	2021	6	0
DF	Ahmed Aqeel^{§}	2021	1	0
DF	Akmal Hussain^{§}	2022	31	0
FW	Arbaz Ahmed^{§}	2022	17	15
