= Pakistan at the 1948 Summer Olympics =

- IOC code: PAK
- NOC: National Olympic Committee of Pakistan
- Website: www.nocpakistan.org

in London
- Competitors: 35 in 6 sports
- Flag bearer: Ahmed Zahur Khan
- Medals: Gold 0 Silver 0 Bronze 0 Total 0

Summer Olympics appearances (overview)
- 1948; 1952; 1956; 1960; 1964; 1968; 1972; 1976; 1980; 1984; 1988; 1992; 1996; 2000; 2004; 2008; 2012; 2016; 2020; 2024; 2028

Other related appearances
- India (1900–pres.); Bangladesh (1984–pres.)

Pakistan competed in the Summer Olympic Games for the first time at the 1948 Summer Olympics in Wembley Park, London, England. 35 competitors, all men, took part in 20 events in 6 sports. As many as 19 Pakistani competitors were members of the field hockey team, which reached the hockey semifinal undefeated, but their campaign ended there.

== Athletics ==
Key

- Note–Ranks given for track events are within the athlete's heat only
- Q = Qualified for the next round
- q = Qualified for the next round as a fastest loser or, in field events, by position without achieving the qualifying target
- NR = National record
- DQ = Disqualified
- DNS / F = Did not start / finish
- N/A = Round not applicable for the event
- Bye = Athlete not required to compete in round
- NM = No mark
- ? = Unknown

Track & road events

Men

Athlete	Event	Heat		Quarter-final		Semi-final		Final	
Athlete	Event	Result	Rank	Result	Rank	Result	Rank	Result	Rank
Muhammad Sharif Butt	100 m	11.23	4	Did not advance					
Muhammad Sharif Butt	200 m	22.8	2 Q	?	6	Did not advance			
Mazhar-Ul-Haque Khan	110 metres hurdles	?	6	Did not advance					
Mohsin Nazar Khan	400 metres hurdles	59.5	6	Did not advance					
Nazar Muhammad Khan Malik	Shot put	?	23	Did not advance					
Ahmed Zahur Khan	Shot put	?	24	Did not advance					
Nazar Muhammad Khan Malik	Discus throw	36.23	26	Did not advance					
Ahmed Zahur Khan	Discus throw	36.23	26	Did not advance					

== Boxing ==
Athlete	Event	Round of 32	Round of 16	Quarterfinals	Semifinals	Final	
Athlete	Event	Opposition Result	Opposition Result	Opposition Result	Opposition Result	Opposition Result	Rank
Allan Monteiro	Bantamweight	Babu Lall (IND); L	did not advance				
Sydney Greve	Featherweight	Mohamed Ammi (FRA); L	did not advance				
Anwar Pasha Turki	Welterweight	Alex Obeysekere (CEY); L	did not advance				

== Cycling ==
Two cyclists, all men, represented Pakistan in 1948.

=== Road ===
Athlete	Event	Time	Rank
Wazir Ali	Individual road race	Did not finish	

=== Track ===
Athlete	Event	Round 1	Repechage	Round 2	Quarterfinals	Semifinals	Final	
Athlete	Event	Opposition Time	Opposition Time	Opposition Time	Opposition Time	Opposition Time	Opposition Time	Rank
Muhammad Naqi Mallick	Sprint	Jack Heid (USA); L 1:57.4	Charlie Bazzano (AUS); L 2:31.0	Did not Advance				

== Hockey ==
Summary

Key:

- FT – After full-time.
- P – Match decided by penalty-shootout.

Team	Event	Group stage					Semifinal	Final / BM		
Team	Event	Opposition Score	Opposition Score	Opposition Score	Opposition Score	Rank	Opposition Score	Opposition Score	Opposition Score	Rank
Pakistan men's	Men's tournament	Belgium; W 2–1	Denmark; W 9–0	France; W 3–1	Netherlands; W 6–1	1	Great Britain; L 0–2	Netherlands; D 1–1	Netherlands; L 1–4	4th

Team roster

Head coach:

Pos.	Player	DoB	Age	Caps	Club	Tournament games	Tournament goals
	Aziz Malik	April 16, 1916	32		(Pakistan) West Punjab Police	7	9
	Mukhtar Bhatti	October 1932	16		(Pakistan) Brothers Club	3	0
	Hamidullah Burki	November 10, 1920	27		(Pakistan) Brothers Club	6	0
	Ali Dara	April 1, 1915	33		(Pakistan) Aryans, Lahore	7	10
	Milton D'Mello				(Pakistan) BOAC	1	0
	Abdul Hamid	January 7, 1927	21		(Pakistan) NWFP	3	1
	Abdul Ghafoor Khan	1920	26		(Pakistan) Aryans, Lahore	4	0
	Abdul Qayyum Khan	November 1922	25		(Pakistan) Pak Independents	1	0
	Aziz-ur Rehman	1923	24		(Pakistan) Pak Independents	2	0
	Niaz Khan	August 21, 1917	30		(Pakistan) Naeem Club	6	0
	Khawaja Muhammad Taqi	1918	30		(Pakistan) Pak Independents	2	0
	Muhammad Khurram	March 1920	27		(Pakistan) Aryans, Lahore	1	0
	Masood Ahmed Khan	June 1918	28		(Pakistan) Brothers Club	6	1
	Anwar Baig	November 1924	22		(Pakistan) Frontier	6	0
	Abdul Razzaq	1921	25		(Pakistan) Aryans, Lahore	6	1
	Syed Muhammad Salim	September 5, 1909	38		(Pakistan) Naeem Club, Lahore	1	0
	Shazada Muhammad Shah-Rukh	October 2, 1926	21		(Pakistan) Aryans, Lahore	6	0
	Mahmood-ul Hassan	August 10, 1924	23		(Pakistan) Burma Shell	4	0
	Remat Ullah Sheikh	February 1921	27		(Pakistan) Septans Club, Rawalpindi	5	0

Group stage

Pos	Team	Pld	W	D	L	GF	GA	GD	Pts	Qualification
1	Pakistan	4	4	0	0	20	3	+17	8	Semi-finals
2	Netherlands	4	3	0	1	11	8	+3	6	Semi-finals
3	Belgium	4	2	0	2	6	8	−2	4	
4	France	4	0	1	3	4	9	−5	1	
5	Denmark	4	0	1	3	4	17	−13	1	

Source: FIH

2 August 1948

Pakistan	2–1	Belgium
Dara; MA Khan	Report	H. Delaval 10'

3 August 1948

Pakistan	9–0	Denmark
Aziz 5', ?', ?', ?', ?', ?', ?', ?'; Dara	Report

5 August 1948

Pakistan	3–1	France
Malik 33'; Dara 38', 53'	Report	Lacroix ?'

Lyons Sports Ground
Umpires:
Cowlishaw (GBR) and Allen (GBR)

7 August 1948

Pakistan	6–1	Netherlands
Dara 3', ?', ?', ?'; Hamid 3'; Razzaq	Report	Kruize

Semifinals

9 August 1948

Great Britain	2–0	Pakistan
White 55'; Adlard 60'	Report

Wembley Stadium
Umpires:
Jean Weymann (SUI)
Erik Husted (DEN)

Bronze medal match

12 August 1948
16:30

Netherlands	1–1 (a.e.t.)	Pakistan
Kruize 37'	Report	Hamid 12'

Wembley Stadium
Umpires:
Cowlishaw (GBR)
Allen (GBR)

13 August 1948

(bronze) Netherlands	4–1	Pakistan
Boerstra 32'; Bromberg 38'; Kruize; Esser		Malik 31'

Lyons Sports Ground
Umpires:
Cowlishaw (GBR)
Allen (GBR)

Note: Pakistan captain Ali Iqtidar Shah (A I S) Dara had represented (undivided) India's gold medal winning men's hockey team at the 1936 Olympic Games in Berlin. Hockey vice-captain Shahzada Shahrukh appeared for Pakistan in the cycling event of the Melbourne Olympics in 1956.

== Swimming ==
Key

- Note–Ranks given are within the athlete's heat only
- Q = Qualified for the next round
- q = Qualified for the next round as a fastest loser
- DQ = Disqualified
- DNS / F = Did not start / finish
- N/A = Round not applicable for the event
- Bye = Athlete not required to compete in round

Men

Athlete	Event	Heat		Semifinal		Final	
Athlete	Event	Time	Rank	Time	Rank	Time	Rank
Anwar Aziz Chaudhry	400 m freestyle	6:17.4	40	did not advance			
Sultan Karim Ali	400 m freestyle	7:16.9	41	did not advance			
Anwar Aziz Chaudhry	1500 m freestyle	25:37.4	39	did not advance			
Jaffar Ali Shah	100 metre backstroke	1:30.2	39	did not advance			
Iftikhar Ahmed Shah	200 metre breaststroke	3:28.1	32	did not advance			
Anwar Aziz Chaudhry; Iftikhar Ahmed Shah; Jaffar Ali Shah; Sultan Karim Ali	4 × 200 metre freestyle relay	12:25.8	6	did not advance			

== Weightlifting ==
Athlete	Event	Press		Snatch		Clean & jerk		Total	
Athlete	Event	Result	Rank	Result	Rank	Result	Rank	Result	Rank
Muhammad Iqbal Butt	75 kg	92.5	18	90.0	23	122.5	19	305.0	22nd
Muhammad Naqi Butt	+82.5 kg	97.5	15	97.5	15	125.0	14	305.0	15th

== Wrestling ==
- Mohammad Amin (Bantamweight)
- Shaukat Ali (Featherweight)
- Abdul Hamid (Lightweight)
- Mohammad Anwar (Heavyweight)

- All four wrestlers could not compete as they had been mistakenly entered for the Greco-Roman style and not freestyle
