= Abd al-Ghaffar =

ʻAbd al-Ghaffār (ALA-LC romanization of Arabic: عبد الغفار) is a male Muslim given name, and, in modern usage, surname, built from the Arabic words ʻabd and al-Ghaffār, one of the names of God in the Qur'an, which give rise to the Muslim theophoric names.

It may refer to:

== Politicians ==
- False-Abd al-Ghaffar (?—1605), Karakalpak sultan, leader of the Karakalpak rebellion (1603–1605). Died in Battle of Kara-Kamysh.
- Khan Abdul Ghaffar Khan (1890–1988), Indian/Pakistani political and spiritual leader
- Abdoel Gaffar Pringgodigdo (1904–1988), Indonesian politician
- Hardan ’Abdul Ghaffar al-Tikriti, or Hardan al-Tikriti (1925–1971), Iraqi Air Force commander and politician
- Rukan Razuki Abd al-Ghafar (born 1956), Iraqi politician
- Abdul Ghafoor (politician, born 1918) (1918–2004) Indian freedom fighter and politician
- Abdul Ghafoor (Saharsa politician)
- Abdul Ghaffar (politician), Pakistani politician
- Abdul Ghafoor Ahmed, Pakistani politician
- Abdul Ghafoor Bhurgri, Pakistani lawyer, writer, and politician
- Abdul Ghafoor Chaudhry, Pakistani politician
- Abdul Ghafoor Haideri, Pakistani politician
- Abdul Ghafoor Hoti, Pakistani politician
- Abdul Ghafoor Khan Durrani, Pakistani politician
- Abdul Ghafoor Khan Mayo, Pakistani politician
- Abdul Ghafor Zori, Afghan politician
- Abdul Ghafar Atan, Malaysian politician
- Abdul Ghafar Baba, Malaysian politician
- Abdul Ghafar Lakanwal, Afghan-American politician and activist
- Abdul Ghaffar Aziz, Pakistani politician
- Abdul Ghaffar Qureshi, Pakistani politician
- Abdul Ghaffar Wattoo, Pakistani politician
- Abdul Gaffar Biswas, Bangladeshi politician
- Abdoel Gaffar Pringgodigdo, Minister of Justice of Indonesia

== Sportsmen ==
- Ramadan Yasser Abdel Ghaffar (born 1980), Egyptian boxer
- Abdoul-Gafar Mamah (born 1985), Togolese footballer
- Abdoul Gafar (born 1998), Burkinabé footballer
- Abdul Ghafoor (sprinter), Afghan sprinter
- Abdul Ghafoor (footballer), Pakistani footballer
- Abdul Ghafoor Assar, Afghan footballer
- Abdul Ghafoor Khan, Pakistani field hockey player
- Abdul Ghafoor Murad, Qatari footballer
- Abdul Ghafoor Yusufzai, Afghan footballer
- Abdul Ghafar Ghafoori, Afghan athlete
- Abdul Gaffar (cricketer), Bangladeshi cricketer (born 1993)
- Abdul Gaffar Saqlain, Bangladeshi cricketer (born 1998)

== Other people ==
- al-Sayyid ʻAbd al-Ghaffār (born 19th century), physician and second photographer of Mecca, who worked with Christiaan Snouck Hurgronje, who – by coincidence – also used the name (Haji) Abdul Ghaffar
- Abdul Gaffar Choudhury (1934–2022), Bangladeshi writer
- Abdul Ghafour (Taliban commander)
- Abdul Ghafour (Guantanamo detainee 954)
- Abdul Gafoor Mahmud, former chief of Bangladeshi air force
- Abdul Ghafoor Breshna, Afghan painter, music composer, poet, and film director
- Ravan A. G. Farhâdi (Abdul Ghafoor Ravan Farhâdi, born 1929), Afghan academic and diplomat
- Abdul Ghafar al-Akhras, Ottoman poet and calligrapher
- Abdul Ghaffar (Guantanamo detainee 1032)
- Shai Jahn Ghafoor (Abdul Ghaffar, 1969–2004), Afghan held in Guantanamo Bay
- Abdul Gaffar Billoo (born 1937), Pakistani philanthropist

== See also ==
- Gaffar
