= Deaths in October 1996 =

The following is a list of notable deaths in October 1996.

Entries for each day are listed alphabetically by surname. A typical entry lists information in the following sequence:

- Name, age, country of citizenship at birth, subsequent country of citizenship (if applicable), reason for notability, cause of death (if known), and reference.

== October 1996 ==
=== 1 ===
- James Beal, 67, New Zealand boxer, leukaemia.
- Carl Fredrik Engelstad, 80, Norwegian writer, playwright, journalist, translator and theatre director.
- Noel Hickey, 71, Australian rules footballer.
- Patrick Jameson, 83, New Zealand Royal Air Force officer and flying ace during World War II.
- Pat McGeown, 40, Irish Provisional Irish Republican Army member, heart attack.
- Fred Meyer, 86, American Olympic gymnast (1932, 1936).
- Herbert Seifert, 89, German mathematician.
- Bill Twomey, Jr., 69, Australian rules football player.
- Alfred Vogel, 93, Swiss herbalist, naturopath and writer.
- Deng Yuzhi, 96, Chinese activist and feminist.

=== 2 ===
- Helmut Artzinger, 84, German politician.
- Robert Bourassa, 63, Canadian politician from Quebec, melanoma.
- Peter J. Brennan, 78, American labor activist and politician, lymphatic cancer.
- Jean-Louis Dauris, 76, French Olympic sailor (1952).
- Richard Arthur Gadbois Jr., 64, American district judge (United States District Court for the Central District of California).
- Tom Hafey, 83, American baseball player (New York Giants, St. Louis Browns).
- Joonas Kokkonen, 74, Finnish composer.
- Emiel van Lennep, 81, Dutch diplomat and politician.
- Andrey Lukanov, 58, Bulgarian politician, assassinated.
- Banjo Matthews, 64, American NASCAR driver, car owner and builder, heart and respiratory disease.
- Les Tietje, 86, American Major League Baseball player (Chicago White Sox, St. Louis Browns).
- Rufus Youngblood, 72, United States Secret Service agent, cancer.

=== 3 ===
- Ilyas Afandiyev, 82, Soviet/Azerbaijani writer.
- Tom Callahan, 75, American basketball player (Providence Steamrollers).
- Bertus Enklaar, 52, Dutch chess International Master.
- Vivienne Goonewardene, 80, Sri Lankan politician.
- George Kubler, 84, American art historian.
- Eustace Roskill, Baron Roskill, 85, British lawyer and public servant.
- István Serényi, 85, Hungarian handball player.

=== 4 ===
- Humphrey Atkins, 74, British politician, cancer.
- Larry Gene Bell, 46, American murderer and convict, execution by electrocution.
- Stephen J. Friedman, 59, American film producer, multiple myeloma.
- Joe Hoerner, 59, American baseball player, farming accident.
- Masaki Kobayashi, 80, Japanese film director, heart attack.
- Silvio Piola, 83, Italian football player.
- Jerry Rivers, 68, American fiddle player, cancer.
- Alma Routsong, 71, American novelist, ovarian cancer.
- Randy Schultz, 52, American gridiron football player (Cleveland Browns, New Orleans Saints).
- Jack Thornton, 91, Australian rugby league footballer.

=== 5 ===
- Judith Allen, 85, American film actress.
- Julius Edgar Arp, 77, Brazilian Olympic swimmer (1936).
- Elmer Berger, 88, American Jewish rabbi and anti-Zionist.
- Wymberley D. Coerr, 83, American politician and diplomat.
- Seymour Cray, 71, American computer scientist, car accident.
- Duanmu Hongliang, 84, Chinese author.
- Richard Kröll, 28, Austrian alpine skier, traffic collision.
- Akira Noguchi, 79, Japanese baseball player and manager.
- Arnold van Mill, 75, Dutch opera singer.
- Joe Walsh, 79, American baseball player (Boston Bees).

=== 6 ===
- Jessie Bernard, 93, American sociologist and feminist, cancer.
- Ted Bessell, 61, American actor (That Girl, Gomer Pyle, U.S.M.C.) and television director (The Tracey Ullman Show), aortic aneurysm.
- Ted Daffan, 84, American country musician.
- Winifred Drinkwater, 83, Scottish aviator and aeroplane engineer.
- Jacques Kielbaey, 76, Belgian Olympic field hockey player (1948).
- Guido Mazzinghi, 64, Italian boxer and Olympian (1952).
- Forrest Pogue, 84, United States Army historian during World War II.
- Trevor Ranson, 84, Australian rules footballer.
- Marjorie Shostak, 51, American anthropologist, cancer.
- Wolfram von Soden, 88, German Assyriologist.
- Vladimir Yerokhin, 66, Russian football player.

=== 7 ===
- José Antonio Burciaga, 56, American Chicano artist, poet, and writer.
- Richard Clarkson, 92, British aeronautical engineer.
- Dame Diana Reader Harris, 83, English head master and public figure.
- Viktor Reimann, 81, Austrian author, journalist and politician.
- Andrew Salter, 82, American psychologist, cancer.
- Zeya, 80, Burmese actor and bodybuilder.

=== 8 ===
- Mignon G. Eberhart, 97, American author of mystery novels.
- Geoffrey Finsberg, 70, British politician.
- Francis D. Lyon, 91, American film and television director.
- David Miller, 71, Canadian ice hockey player and Olympian (1952).
- Ferdinand Montier, 87, French racing driver.
- William Prince, 83, American actor.

=== 9 ===
- Per Asplin, 68, Norwegian actor and musician.
- Marland P. Billings, 94, American structural geologist.
- William L. DeAndrea, 44, American writer.
- Nigel Fisher, 83, British politician.
- George F. Kerr, 78, English writer.
- Walter Kerr, 83, American writer and theatre critic, congestive heart failure.
- John W. King, 79, American politician.
- Roy Lewis, 82, English writer and small press printer.
- Josiah Majekodunmi, 69, Nigerian high jumper and Olympian (1952).
- Colleen Peterson, 45, Canadian country and folk singer, cancer.
- Aleksandar Popović, 66, Serbian writer.
- Harvey Vernon, 69, American actor.
- Harry D. Yates, 93, American banker and politician.

=== 10 ===
- Ted Bryce, 83, Australian rules footballer.
- Harold Cleghorn, 83, New Zealand weightlifter and Olympian (1952).
- Coya Knutson, 84, American politician, member of the United States House of Representatives (1955-1959).
- Bob Reynolds, 57, American gridiron football player (St. Louis Cardinals, New England Patriots).
- Toshio Sugie, 83, Japanese film director.
- David Viscott, 58, American psychiatrist, author, and media personality, heart failure complicated by diabetes.

=== 11 ===
- Lars Ahlfors, 89, Finnish mathematician, pneumonia.
- Keith Boyce, 53, Barbadian cricketer.
- Carlos Mancheno Cajas, 94, President of Ecuador.
- Eleanor Cameron, 84, Canadian-American children's author and critic.
- Johnny Costa, 74, American jazz pianist, aplastic anemia.
- Roberto Ferrari, 73, Italian fencer and Olympian (1952, 1956, 1960).
- Bernardo Grinspun, 70, Argentinian politician.
- Roger Lapébie, 85, French racing cyclist.
- Joe Morris, 83, Canadian trade unionist.
- Terry Patchett, 56, British politician, cancer.
- Edith Penrose, 81, American-British economist.
- Renato Russo, 36, Brazilian singer and songwriter, complications caused by AIDS.
- Edwin Spanier, 75, American mathematician at the University of California at Berkeley.
- William Vickrey, 82, Canadian economist, Nobel prize winner, heart failure.
- Rolf Widerøe, 94, Norwegian accelerator physicist.
- Gerald Wild, 89, Australian politician.

=== 12 ===
- Nina Alisova, 80, Soviet/Russian actress.
- Erik Blomberg, 83, Finnish cinematographer, screenwriter, film director and producer.
- Mac Holten, 74, Australian politician and sportsman.
- Helmut Hölzer, 84, German rocket engineer.
- Stefan Knapp, 75, Polish painter and sculptor.
- Eddie Kuzma, 85, American auto racing builder.
- René Lacoste, 92, French tennis champion, businessman, and Olympian (1924), cancer.
- Vangelis Moiropoulos, 91, Greek Olympic sprinter (1928, 1932).
- Jack Robertson, 79, English cricket player.
- Gerard Thoolen, 53, Dutch actor, AIDS.

=== 13 ===
- Carl H. Dodd, 71, United States Army soldier and a recipient of the Medal of Honor.
- Horst Kopkow, 85, German Nazi politician and SS officer, pneumonia.
- Henri Nannen, 82, German journalist.
- Beryl Reid, 77, English actress, kidney failure.
- Brad Robinson, 37-38, Australian rock musician, lymphoma.
- Jopie Roosenburg-Goudriaan, 83, Dutch painter.

=== 14 ===
- Marcel Bourbonnais, 78, Canadian politician, member of the House of Commons of Canada (1958-1963).
- Rex Darling, 82, American football, basketball, and tennis coach.
- Tadeusz Grzelak, 66, Polish Olympic boxer (1952).
- William John Hooper, 80, British cartoonist.
- Václav Hovorka, 65, Czech football player.
- Ferd Johnson, 90, American comic strip cartoonist.
- Tan Chee Khoon, 77, Malaysian politician.
- Laura La Plante, 91, American film actress, Alzheimer's disease.
- Jim Mitchell, 75, Australian rules footballer.
- Izidor Papo, 82, Yugoslav general.

=== 15 ===
- Mike Balas, 86, American Major League Baseball player (Boston Bees).
- Leo Eitinger, 83, Czech psychiatrist.
- Tom Ferrick, 81, American Major League Baseball player, pitching coach and scout, heart failure.
- Pierre Franey, 75, French chef, stroke.
- Rolando Rubalcava, 73, Mexican Olympic basketball player (1952).
- Toma Tomas, 72, Iraqi guerilla and politician.
- Jean Adeline Morgan Wanatee, 85, Native American and women's rights activist.
- Robert F. Williams, 71, American civil rights leader and author, Hodgkin's lymphoma.

=== 16 ===
- Peter Brodie, 79, Scottish minister.
- Guy Crescent, 76, French businessman and founder of Paris Saint-Germain F.C..
- Graham Drane, 80, Australian Olympic sailor (1956, 1964).
- Gertrude Flynn, 87, American actress.
- Anthony Griffin, 75, British admiral.
- Eric Malpass, 85, English novelist.
- Harold J. Powers, 96, American politician.
- Hunter Rouse, 90, American physicist.
- Huang Shao-ku, 95, Chinese politician, Vice Premier.

=== 17 ===
- Chris Acland, 30, English drummer and songwriter, suicide by hanging.
- Bob Adams, 95, American baseball player (Boston Red Sox), and coach.
- Jaroslav Balík, 72, Czechoslovak film director and screenwriter.
- Guillermo Garibay, 75, Mexican baseball player.
- Berthold Goldschmidt, 93, German-British Jewish composer.
- Bert Hopwood, 87-88, British motorcycle designer.
- Laura Sabia, 80, Canadian social activist and feminist, Parkinson's disease.
- Hans Wikne, 82, Swedish Olympic equestrian (1964).

=== 18 ===
- Jason Bernard, 58, American actor (Herman's Head, WarGames, Bird), heart attack.
- Louise Bertram, 88, Canadian figure skater and Olympian (1936).
- Luciano Durán Böger, 91, Bolivian poet, writer and politician.
- Hans Drachsler, 80, German politician.
- Elmer Klumpp, 90, American Major League Baseball player (Washington Senators, Brooklyn Dodgers).
- Alex Motter, 83, Canadian ice hockey player (Boston Bruins, Detroit Red Wings).
- Simon Soloveychik, 66, Soviet/Russian writer and philosopher.
- Giovanni Testa, 93, Italian Olympic cross-country skier (1928).
- Sheldon Vanauken, 82, American journalist, lung cancer.

=== 19 ===
- Josef Becker, 91, German politician.
- Maurice Elliott, 53, Scottish footballer, brain haemorrhage.
- Ralston Hill, 69, American actor and singer.
- John Hillaby, 79, British travel writer and explorer.
- Bobby Rackard, 69, Irish hurler.
- Shamsuddin Qasemi, 61, Bangladeshi Islamic scholar and politician.

=== 20 ===
- Robert Benayoun, 75, French film critic and author.
- J. Bracken Lee, 97, American politician.
- Sebastian Santa Maria, 37, Chilean composer.
- Yuri Neprintsev, 87, Soviet/Russian painter, graphic artist and art teacher.
- Richard M. Powell, 79, American screenwriter, prostate cancer.
- Luigi Rovere, 88, Italian film producer.
- Werner Spycher, 79, Swiss Olympic wrestler (1936).

=== 21 ===
- Léon Ashkenazi, 74, Jewish spiritual leader, philosopher and educator.
- Eric Halsall, 76, English author and television presenter.
- Albert G. Hill, 86, American physcisist and pioneer in the development of radar.
- Wang Li, 74, Chinese politician, pancreatic cancer.
- Les Mead, 87, Australian rugby player and coach.
- Ibrahim Sory Touré, 26, Malian footballer.
- Allie White, 81, American gridiron football player (Philadelphia Eagles).
- Georgios Zoitakis, 86, Greek Army general and regent of Greece.
- Giovanni Zuddas, 68, Italian Olympic boxer (1948).

=== 22 ===
- John Bauldie, 47, British journalist, helicopter crash.
- Edmund Black, 91, American Olympic hammer thrower (1928).
- Kathy Change, 46, Chinese-American political activist, writer, and performance artist, self-immolation.
- Shmarya Guttman, 87, Israeli archaeologist.
- Matthew Harding, 42, British businessman, helicopter crash.
- Dianne Heatherington, 48, Canadian rock singer and businesswoman, ovarian cancer.
- Noel Hilliard, 67, New Zealand novelist.
- Hermann Höfer, 62, German football player and Olympian (1956).
- Howie Hoffman, 74, American basketball player.
- Sten Rudberg, 79, Swedish geologist and geomorphologist.

=== 23 ===
- Henry Allard, 84, Swedish politician.
- Chet Blaylock, 71, American politician, heart attack.
- Kurt Freund, 82, Czech-Canadian physician and sexologist, suicide.
- Bob Grim, 66, American Major League Baseball player, heart attack.
- Harold Hughes, 74, American politician.
- Michel Kelber, 87–88, French cinematographer.
- J. Daniel Mahoney, 65, American circuit judge (United States Court of Appeals for the Second Circuit).
- Lin Onus, 47, Australian artist of Scottish-Aboriginal origins.
- Franc Smolej, 88, Slovenian Olympic skier (1936, 1948).
- Diana Trilling, 91, American literary critic and author.

=== 24 ===
- Robert Anderson, 60, New Zealand politician, cancer.
- Artur Axmann, 83, Nazi German Hitler Youth leader.
- Roderick Barclay, 87, British diplomat and ambassador.
- Françoise Gignoux, 73, French Olympic alpine skier (1948).
- Gladwyn Jebb, 96, British civil servant, diplomat and politician.
- Hyman Minsky, 77, American economist.
- Romica Puceanu, 69, Romanian singer.
- Joe Spencer, 73, American gridiron football player (Cleveland Browns, Green Bay Packers), and coach, cancer.

=== 25 ===
- Ennio De Giorgi, 68, Italian mathematician.
- Bill Elsworth, 60, Australian rules footballer.
- Solveig Gunbjørg Jacobsen, 83, First person born on South Georgia.
- Maria Litto, 77, German ballet dancer, choreographer and film actress.
- Robert Racic, 32, Australian DJ and record producer, brain virus.
- Harry Shuman, 81, American Major League Baseball player (Pittsburgh Pirates, Philadelphia Phillies).
- Brian Stacey, 49, Australian conductor.
- Roland Wilson, 92, Australian public servant and economist.

=== 26 ===
- Miquel Asins Arbó, 80, Spanish composer.
- Aurelio Chessa, 82, Italian anarchist, journalist and historian.
- Abdelhamid ben Hadouga, 71, Algerian writer.
- Lewis Kamas, 75, American military lieutenant and politician.
- Hans W. Kosterlitz, 93, German-British biochemist.
- Henri Lepage, 88, French Olympic fencer (1948).
- Derek Tangye, 84, British writer.
- Sofia Tuibayeva, 83, Soviet/Tajikistani actress.
- Adolf Turakainen, 64, Finnish Olympic sprinter (1952).
- Wendy Wild, 40, American singer, musician, and artist, breast cancer.

=== 27 ===
- Henry Piet Drury van Asch, 85, New Zealand aviator and surveyor.
- Rewat Buddhinan, 48, Thai singer and music producer, brain cancer.
- Charlotte Jay, 76, Australian mystery writer and novelist.
- Marcello Mihalich, 89, Italian football player and manager.
- Arthur Tremblay, 79, Canadian politician, member of the Senate of Canada (1979-1992).
- Felix Ucko, 77, American Olympic field hockey player (1948, 1956).

=== 28 ===
- Morey Amsterdam, 87, American actor and comedian, heart attack.
- Reuben Baetz, 73, Canadian politician.
- Irene Cortes, 75, Filipino lawyer, Associate Justice of the Supreme Court.
- Jimmy Haig, 71, Scottish-New Zealand rugby player.
- Robert Hankey, 2nd Baron Hankey, 91, British diplomat and public servant.
- Karol Jokl, 51, Slovak football player and manager.
- Paul Lambert, 88, French Olympic water polo player (1936).
- Joe Samuels, 91, American baseball player (Detroit Tigers).

=== 29 ===
- Ewell Blackwell, 74, American Major League Baseball player (Cincinnati Reds, New York Yankees, Kansas City Athletics).
- J. Edward Day, 82, American lawyer and United States Postmaster General, heart attack.
- Richard Duffin, 87, American physicist.
- Eugen Kapp, 88, Estonian composer and music educator.
- Robert Levin, 84, Norwegian classical pianist and composer.
- Christophe Munzihirwa, 70, Congolese catholic prelate and Archbishop of Bukavu, murdered.
- Ralph Vince, 96, American gridiron football player (Cleveland Indians, Cleveland Bulldogs, Cleveland Panthers).

=== 30 ===
- John Barnum, 85, American golfer.
- Roberto Belangero, 68, Brazilian football player.
- John Matthew Cannella, 88, American federal judge, and football player (New York Giants).
- Eleanor Lansing Dulles, 101, American author, professor, and state official.
- George R. E. Shell, 88, United States Marine Corps brigadier general.
- Bob Thorpe, 69, American baseball player (Boston/Milwaukee Braves).
- John Young, 80, Scottish actor.

=== 31 ===
- Louise Bates Ames, 92, American psychologist.
- Marcel Carné, 90, French film director.
- Peter Doig, 85, British politician.
- Frank Kurtz, 85, American Olympic diver (1932, 1936), and aviator, complications following a fall.
- Arthur Peterson, Jr., 83, American actor, Alzheimer's disease.
- William Rosenwald, 93, American businessman and philanthropist.
