= Sanjay Rajagopalan =

Sanjay Rajagopalan, MD

Sanjay Rajagopalan is the Herman Hellerstein Professor of Medicine and Chief Scientific and Medical Officer at the Harrington Heart and Vascular Institute, University Hospitals and Professor Medicine and Director of Cardiovascular Research Institute at the Case Western Reserve University (CWRU) in Cleveland, Ohio. He holds secondary appointments in the Case Western Reserve University Departments of Physiology, Radiology and Biomedical Engineering. Much of his research has been on using technology to guide the detection and treatment of heart disease and more recently on the impact of environmental exposures and climate change on cardiovascular health.

== Education ==
Rajagopalan underwent his medical school training at the University of Madras, India. Following his medical school training and internship, he underwent residency training at the State University of New York (SUNY) Medical Dental Consortium, in Buffalo, NY, where he also served as Chief Resident, at the Veterans Affairs Medical Center (VAMC). He underwent clinical fellowship training at the Emory Clinic and Atlanta VAMC and a Research Fellowship in Vascular Biology at Emory University. Rajagopalan underwent training in Magnetic Resonance Angiography at Cornell University, New York followed by training in Cardiac magnetic resonance imaging at Duke Cardiovascular Magnetic Resonance Center.

== Career ==
Rajagopalan began his academic career at the University of Michigan as assistant professor of Medicine where he helped develop a translational research program in Gene Therapy for the treatment of vascular disorders and a clinical training program in Vascular Medicine and Imaging. He moved to the Mount Sinai Heart under Valentin Fuster, as an associate professor of medicine at Mount Sinai School of Medicine in New York. Rajagopalan was subsequently recruited to Ohio State University College of Medicine as a tenured professor and inaugural Wolfe Professor of Cardiovascular Research, Director Vascular Medicine and Advanced CT/MR Imaging. He served as the Chief of Cardiology and co-director of University of Maryland Heart Center in Baltimore, before returning to Ohio to head the Division of Cardiovascular Medicine, at University Hospitals, Harrington Heart and Vascular Institute and lead the Cardiovascular Research Institute at Case Western Reserve School of Medicine. In 2021, he was appointed the Chief Medical and Scientific Officer for the Harrington Heart and Vascular Institute at UH Hospitals.

== Awards and memberships ==
Rajagopalan is the recipient of several awards including the William F. Keating American College of Cardiology (ACC) Award Hypertension and Vascular Diseases, the Charles A. Dana Foundation Scholarship. In 2008 he was appointed as the inaugural John W. Wolfe Professorship at the Ohio State University; in 2013 as the Melvin Sharoky, MD Endowed Professorship in Medicine, University of Maryland Baltimore and in 2017 as the Herman Hellerstein Professorship at University Hospitals, Case Western Reserve School of Medicine. In 2021, Rajagopalan received a Distinguished Scientist Award (Translational) from the ACC.

Rajagopalan is an elected member of the American Society of Clinical Investigation, Association of University Cardiologists and the Association of Professors of Cardiology and the American Association of Physicians.

Rajagopalan has served as a Member of multiple committees for the National Institutes of Health and for societies such as the American Heart Association, and for the Environmental Protection Agency. Rajagopalan is a Fellow of the American College of Cardiology, Society of Cardiac Computed Tomography, and Member, Society of Cardiovascular Magnetic Resonance Imaging and Society of Vascular Medicine.

== Research ==
In 2007, Rajagopalan, co-founded InVasc Therapeutics, a company devoted to the treatment of cardiometabolic disease. As Founding Director of the Center for Integrated and Novel Approaches in Vascular-Metabolic Disease (CINEMA), a center for excellence at UH Hospitals, Rajagopalan laid the groundwork for novel care delivery approaches for patients with Type 2 Diabetes. He is also the Founding Director of the Center for Advanced Heart and Vascular Care, a visionary unit that houses advanced imaging, alongside a Hybrid Catheterization Laboratory at University Hospitals. In 2016, Rajagopalan together with colleagues at University Hospitals helped introduce a free coronary calcium score program for precision medicine initiatives.

=== Research in environmental transformation and health sustainability ===
Rajagopalan has a long-standing interest in the health effects of factors such as air pollution, noise, chemical exposures and factors in the built environment, that exert disproportionate effects on the heart and blood vessels. He has championed the idea that human health and well-being are intimately linked to the state of the external and internal environments. His published work have allowed a better understanding of the mechanisms, global burden of disease and the steps that needs to be taken to mitigate environmental exposures. More recent interests have been in health care sustainability and urban transformation to promote heart health. Rajagopalan was awarded an eight-year $7 million grant, the Revolutionizing Innovative, Visionary Environmental health Research (R 35, RIVER), for his work on the environment and health.

== Publication recognition ==
Rajagopalan has over 51,000 academic citations. Rajagopalan has authored two textbooks and several monographs. He has eight patents issued in the areas of therapeutic drug discovery and novel imaging pulse sequences.

- Manual of Vascular Diseases, May 11, 2012 ISBN 9788184737097
- CT and MR Angiography of the Peripheral Circulation: Practical Approach with Clinical Protocols, May 30, 2007, ISBN 978-1841846064
