= Saeed Kashani =

Pakistani male field hockey players

Saeed Kashani سعید کاشانی
Personal information
- Nationality: (United Kingdom) British Indian (1946-1947) (Pakistan) Pakistani (1947-2025)
- Born: 26 January 1947 Raipur, Chhattisgarh, British Raj
- Died: 27 June 2025 (aged 78) Karachi, Pakistan

Sport
- Sport: Field hockey
- Position: Centre-forward
Senior career
Years	Team	Caps	Goals
1963-64	PIA	-	-
1964-76	Pakistan Customs	-	-
National team
Years	Team	Caps	Goals
1967–69	Pakistan	10	(0)
- Updated on 10 December 2025

Saeed Kashani (Urdu: سعید کاشانی ) (26 January 1946 – 27 June 2025) was a Pakistani former international field hockey player. He played 10 international field hockey matches for Pakistan during 1960s. He was younger brother of former Pakistan field hockey centre-forward Olympian Abdul Waheed.

== Start of hockey ==
After migration from India, his family settled in Karachi's Pir Ilahi Bakhsh Colony. He got his early education at the Model School of Karachi's Pakistan Chowk. He got opportunity to play from the school team. Later, he also captained the school team. He also continued playing from the Model Hockey Club. After school, he took admission in city's Islamia College. He became captain of the Islamia College hockey team in 1963. Soon, he started playing for Karachi Zone. He brought a number of successes for the college team. Later, he joined two top field hockey teams of the country one after another namely PIA (1963) and Pakistan Customs (1964). He continued to play for the Pakistan Customs till 1976.

== Selection to Pakistan hockey team ==
Kashani was first called to the national training camp in 1964. He was included in the Multan Zone field hockey team to play against the visiting Japan in Multan in April 1964. He also scored a goal in this match. His selection to Pakistan men's national field hockey team only came after the retirement of his elder brother Abdul Waheed since both of them played on the same position (centre-forward). He was first selected to the national team to play against the visiting teams of Netherlands in February 1967 and Australia in October 1967. Then he played in pre-Olympics festival in London in October 1967. He was also member of Pakistan hockey team which played in pre-Olympics hockey festival in Lahore, Pakistan in January 1968. Two months later, he was member of the Pakistan team which took part in the Nairobi International Tournament in Kenya. He was replaced as centre-forward in the Pakistan field hockey team by Rashid Junior. Still, Kashani was included in the Pakistan team for Lahore International Tournament held in March 1969 and to play against the visiting Argentina field hockey team later in the year.

== Memorable match ==
The memorable match of his life came at Lord's, London on 21 October 1967. This was a match between India and Pakistan during the Pre-Olympic Hockey Tournament in London. Pakistan beat India by one goal to zero. The goal was scored by left-fullback Tariq Aziz on a penalty corner. This was Pakistan's first victory against India after the 1962 Asian Games hockey final. Pakistan eleven consisted of these players: Zakir Hussain, Riazuddin, Tariq Aziz, Rashid Senior, Saeed Anwar, Fazalur Rehman, Khalid Mahmood, Tariq Niazi (he played right-in in this match), Saeed Kashani, Muhammad Asad Malik and Jahangir Butt.
