= Yenser =

Yenser is a surname of German origin, derived from German Jenzer or Jentzer. Notable people with the surname include:

- Stephen Yenser (born 1941), American poet and literary critic
- Thomas Yenser (1866–1949), American publisher and editor
