= John Renwick =

John Renwick may refer to:

- John Renwick (Doc Savage), a Doc Savage character
- John Renwick (field hockey) (1921–2009), American field hockey player
