= Egon Johansen =

- Egon Johansen (field hockey)
- Egon Johansen (footballer)
