= Jenzer =

Yenser is a surname. Notable people with the surname include:

- Adrian Jenzer (born 1967), Swiss footballer
- Andreas Jenzer, founder of Jenzer Motorsport
- Roland Jenzer, Swiss hockey player

== See also ==
- Jenz
- Jentzsch
- Jenser
