= Rony Gardener =

Pakistani field hockey player

Personal information
- Full name: Ronald "Rony" Gardener
- Nationality: Pakistani

Sport
- Sport: Field hockey
Medal record
Men's Field Hockey
Representing Pakistan
| Gold medal – first place | 1960 Rome | Team |

Ronald "Rony" Gardener was a Pakistani field hockey player. He played two matches for Pakistan's national field hockey team. He was part of the gold-winning Pakistani national team at the 1960 Summer Olympics where Pakistan defeated India in the final of the hockey tournament to win the nation's first Olympic gold.

== See also ==
- Pakistan at the 1960 Summer Olympics
- List of Pakistani field hockey players
