= Karakalpak rebellion (1603–1605) =

Revolt against the Kazakh Khanate by the Karakalpaks

Abd al-Ghaffar's rebellion
Date	1603–1605
Location	Syrdarya, Kazakhstan
Result	Uprising suppressed
Territorial changes	Kazakhs restored control over the Syr Darya cities, Tashkent and Fergana

Belligerents
Kazakh Khanate	Karakalpaks

Commanders and leaders
(Kazakh Khanate) Esim Khan (Kazakh Khanate) Batyr Khan	Abd al-Ghaffar †

Abd al-Ghaffar's rebellion — the uprising of the Karakalpaks, led by their proclaimed ruler "Abd al-Ghaffar Sultan", against the Kazakh Khanate.

== Background ==
The new ruler of the Kazakhs was Esim, the brother of Tawakkul. He chose not to continue the war and agreed to peace, which the representatives of the Bukharan Khan had persistently sought. As a result of the negotiations, Pir-Muhammad ceded Tashkent, Sayram, and Turkestan to Esim but retained the ancient capital of Mawarannahr—Samarkand.

== Uprising ==
Among the political rivals of Esim Khan, sources particularly highlight two sultans — the impostor Abd al-Ghaffar and Tursun-Muhammad. The story of the first is described in the work Musakhkhir al-bilad by Muhammad-Yar ibn Arab Katagan. The events he describes took place after the death of Shibanid Abdullah and his successor Abd al-Mumin, during the reign of Janid Baki-Muhammad in Mawarannahr and Esim Khan in Kazakhstan.

In the autumn of 1603, corresponding to the Year of the Leopard, the Karakalpaks in Turkestan enthroned a man, proclaiming him Abd al-Ghaffar Sultan—allegedly the son of Shibanid Baba Sultan. In response, Esim Khan, Batyr Sultan, and other Kazakh sultans gathered an army and marched from Tashkent and Sayram to confront the impostor. The battle lasted twelve days, but on the thirteenth day, the Kazakh army suffered defeat. As a result, the impostor Abd al-Ghaffar Sultan seized Turkestan, Sayram, Tashkent, Ahsikent, and Andijan, making Tashkent his capital.

In the spring of 1605, the Year of the Hare, he left Tashkent and set up camp in the clearing of Kara-Kamysh, about three to four kilometers from the city gates. At the same time, Esim and Batyr, who had marched with their army from Ala-Tag to fight the impostor Abd al-Ghaffar, approached the outskirts of Tashkent. They captured a prisoner who revealed important information.

Learning about the situation of the impostor Abd al-Ghaffar, Esim and Batyr launched a sudden attack on the camp in Kara-Kamysh at dawn. The impostor was still asleep. Awakened by the sound of galloping horses, he ran out of his tent in fear. At that moment, Esim Khan appeared and pierced his stomach with a massive saber. Esim Khan defeated Abd al-Ghaffar, after which the Kazakhs regained control over the Syr Darya cities, Tashkent, and Fergana.

== Bibliography ==
- Sultanov, T. I. (2006). Поднятые на белой кошме. Ханы Казахских степей (in Russian). Almaty: Астана-Даму-21. ISBN 9965-9522-8-0.
- Akimbekov, S. M. (2016). История степей:феномен государства Чингисхана в истории Евразии (in Russian). Almaty: Институт Азиатских исследований. ISBN 978-601-7550-01-1.

== Recommendation of literature ==
- Atygaev, N. (2023). Казахское ханство: очерки внешнеполитической истории XV-XVII веков (in Russian). Almaty: Евразийский научно-исследовательский институт МКТУ им. Х.А. Ясави. ISBN 978-601-7805-24-1.
