= Gaffar =

Gaffar is a male Muslim given name of Arabic origin and may refer to:

- Bumin Gaffar Çitanak (1934–2017), Turkish film actor known as Fikret Hakan
- Gaffar Ahmed, Fijian politician of Indian descent
- Gaffar Okkan (1952–2001), assassinated Turkish police chief

== See also ==
- Abdul Ghaffar
