= Aziz Naik =

Pakistani field hockey player (1936–2014)

Abdul Aziz Naik (September 29, 1936 – May 2, 2014) was a Pakistani field hockey player. Born in Peshawar, Pakistan on 29 September 1936, he was the fourth son to Ghulam Mohy Uddin Naik and Hakim Bibi. Aziz Naik was a patriot to his country. Aziz Naik served in the Pakistan Air Force in 1952 and later became a national celebrity when he represented Pakistan in Summer Olympics: Melbourne in 1956. Graduated from Punjab University, Aziz Naik played for the University Eleven 1948. Represented N.W.F.P. in National Championships in 1949–50. Played for the Pakistan Air Force in 1952. Aziz Naik represented Pakistan against German Eleven in 1954 and toured with the Pakistan National Hockey Team in Singapore and Malaya in 1955. In 1956, Aziz Naik was a member of Pakistan field hockey team at Summer Olympics in Melbourne, Australia where his country won a silver medal.

In 1957 Aziz Naik emigrated to Montreal, Canada, where he established his wholesale sports goods business. In 1963 he married a Canadian-French woman Denise Le Goff. They had three sons: Atif, Ali, and Jamil. Aziz Naik was very active in the Muslim community in Montreal, and between 1972 and 1979 he headed the Pakistani community in Montreal's Islamic Centre of Learning. Aziz Naik was one of the leading founders of the first Islamic Modern Mosque in Canada in 1959.

== Death ==
He died on 2 May 2014 in Montreal, Canada.

== See also ==
- List of Pakistani field hockey players
