= Qazi Abdul Waheed =

Pakistani field hockey player (born 1922)

Personal information
- Nationality: Pakistani
- Born: 16 April 1922

Sport
- Sport: Field hockey

Qazi Abdul Waheed (born 16 April 1922) was a field hockey player from Pakistan who played for Pakistan's national field hockey team.

Abdul Waheed was part of the national hockey team at the 1948 and 1952 Summer Olympics.

== See also ==
- List of Pakistani field hockey players
