= Ahmed Zahur Khan =

Pakistani athlete (born 1918)

Ahmed Zahur Khan (born 1918, date of death unknown) was a Pakistani shot putter and discus thrower who competed in the 1948 Summer Olympics. Khan was the flag bearer for Pakistan at the opening ceremony of the nation's inaugural Olympics.

== See also ==
- Pakistan at the 1948 Summer Olympics
