= Qazi Salahuddin =

Pakistani field hockey player (born 1942)

Personal information
- Nationality: Pakistani
- Born: 6 January 1942 (age 84) Peshawar, British India

Sport
- Sport: Field hockey
Medal record
Men's Field Hockey
Representing Pakistan
Gold medal – first place	1968 Mexico City	Team

Qazi Salahuddin (born 6 January 1942) is a Pakistani former field hockey player. He played for the Pakistan national field hockey team from 1967–69. He was part of the gold-winning Pakistan team at the 1968 Summer Olympics that defeated Australia 2-1 in the final. Salahuddin has also served as the coach of the Khyber Pakhtunkhwa women hockey team.

== See also ==
- Pakistan at the 1968 Summer Olympics
- List of Pakistani field hockey players
