= Adnan Zakir =

Pakistani field hockey player

Personal information
- Born: 23 December 1986 (age 39) Karachi, Sindh, Pakistan

Sport
- Sport: Field hockey
- Position: Midfielder Striker
Youth career
- Team
- –: Habib Public School
- –: YMCA
Senior career
Years	Team	Caps	Goals
1999	National Bank of Pakistan	-	-
National team
Years	Team	Caps	Goals
2001-2006	Pakistan	169	(8)

Adnan Zakir
Coaching career (HC unless noted)
- 2017-Present: St Albans (Head Coach)
- 2015-2017: Newmarket (Head Coach)
- (2015-2017): Ipswich (Director & Head Coach)
- (2014-2015): Canterbury (Coach)
- (2012-2014): Old Loughtanian ( Head Coach)
- (2008-2012): Holcombe (Player/Coach)

Adnan Zakir
Medal record

Men's field hockey

Representing Pakistan

Commonwealth Games
Silver medal – second place	2006 Australia	Team

Hockey Champions Trophy
Bronze medal – third place	2004 Pakistan	Team

Sultan Azlan Shah Cup
Bronze medal – third place	2005 Malaysia	Team

Adnan Zakir (born 23 December 1986) is a Pakistani former professional field hockey player. He was born in Karachi, Pakistan. Zakir played both midfielder and striker positions for the national Pakistan men's national field hockey team. He made his international debut in January 2001 playing as a junior player against England U-21. He continued to represent the country and played his first international game as a senior player in June 2004 against India.

Zakir later transitioned to coaching in 2008 and is currently the Head Coach of St Albans Hockey Club . Since 2024 he is the head coach of the Club zur Vahr in Germany.

== Early career ==
Zakir started his professional career in 1999 playing for the National Bank of Pakistan hockey team. His first coach was Tahir Zaman, who played for Pakistan’s national field hockey team and later on served as its captain. His first major national tournament was the National Senior Championship, which was played in August 1999.

== Coaching career ==
Zakir also started coaching teams while playing professionally then moved to a full-time coaching position at a national and eventually an international level.

== National ==
- Strength and conditioning Coach and Sports Nutritionist of Pakistan men's national field hockey team 2013-2014

== International ==
- Strength & conditioning Coach and assisting Head Coach of Azerbaijan men's national field hockey team 2013-2015.
- Strengthen & Conditioning Coach and Assistant Coach of Egypt men's national field hockey team 2010-2012.
- Director of Coaching and Head Coach of Ipswich Hockey Club 2015-2017.
- Head of IHC academy 2015-2016.
- Hockey coach and Strength and Conditioning coach of Ipswich High School 2016–present.
- Head coach of Sutton Valence Hockey Club (Champions of the league) 2014-2015.
- Head coach of Sutton Valence School 2011-2015
- Head coach of Burnt Ash Hockey Club (Champions of the League) 2012-2013.
- Player/Coach of Old Loughtonians Hockey Club South-East Division 1 2012-2014]
- Head coach of Academy and Player/coach of Holcombe Hockey Club South-East Division 1 2008-2012
- Director and Head Coach at Newmarket Hockey Club 2015–present
- Head coach of St Albans Hockey Club from 2017–present

== See also ==
- Pakistan Hockey Federation
- List of Pakistani field hockey players
