= Deepak L. Bhatt =

American cardiologist

- Citizenship: United States
- Education: Massachusetts Institute of Technology, Cornell University, Harvard University, University of Oxford
- Known for: Cardiovascular medicine, interventional cardiology
- Scientific career
- Fields: Clinical investigator, educator, author, cardiology
- Workplaces: Cleveland Clinic, VA Medical Center, Brigham and Women's Hospital, Harvard Medical School, Mount Sinai Health System, Icahn School of Medicine at Mount Sinai
- Website: https://deepakbhattmd.com/

Deepak L. Bhatt is an American interventional cardiologist, researcher, and educator. He is known for novel clinical trials in cardiovascular prevention, intervention, and heart failure. He is the director of Mount Sinai Fuster Heart Hospital in New York City, the Valentin Fuster Professor of Cardiovascular Medicine at the Icahn School of Medicine at Mount Sinai, and Dean for Clinical Research–Industry Partnerships. Prior, he served as the executive director of Interventional Cardiovascular programs at Brigham and Women's Hospital Heart and Vascular Center and a professor of medicine at Harvard Medical School. He was given the American College of Cardiology's Distinguished Mentor Award in 2018, and in 2019, the American Heart Association (AHA) presented him with its Distinguished Scientist award, and as of 2025 he is president of the AHA New York City Board. As of 2025, Google Scholar reports that he has been cited 300,459 times, has an h-index of 216, and an i10-index of 1305.

== Education and career ==
Bhatt graduated Boston Latin School, earned his science degree as a National Merit Scholar from MIT, an MD from Cornell and an MPH from Harvard. He received his Executive MBA from the University of Oxford in 2024.

He trained in internal medicine and cardiology at the University of Pennsylvania and Cleveland Clinic, completing fellowships in interventional cardiology and cerebral and peripheral vascular intervention. He served as chief interventional fellow at Cleveland Clinic where he worked as an interventional cardiologist, associate professor of medicine, director of the interventional cardiology fellowship, associate director of the cardiovascular medicine fellowship, and associate director of the cardiovascular coordinating center.

Later, he became Chief of Cardiology at the VA Boston Healthcare System and later served as executive director of the Interventional Cardiovascular Programs at Brigham and Women's Hospital. Additionally, he was a Senior Investigator in the TIMI Study Group and Editor-in-Chief of the Harvard Heart Letter. In 2012, he was appointed a professor of medicine at Harvard Medical School.

Bhatt later joined the Mount Sinai Health System, where he became director of Mount Sinai Fuster Heart Hospital and the Dr. Valentin Fuster Professor of Cardiovascular Medicine at the Icahn School of Medicine at Mount Sinai. In 2026, he was appointed Dean for Clinical Research–Industry Partnerships at Icahn.

=== Board positions ===
As of 2024, Bhatt serves on the Board of Directors and Science and Technology Committee of Bristol Myers Squibb. He is on the cardiovascular advisory board for McKinsey and is a consultant to Broadview Ventures. He had previously served on the Board of Directors of the Boston VA Research Institute and as a Trustee of the American College of Cardiology. He is President of the Board of Directors of the American Heart Association New York City chapter.

== Research ==
=== Focus ===
Bhatt's research spans multiple areas of cardiovascular medicine, with an emphasis on interventional cardiology, acute coronary syndromes, stroke, and heart failure, as well as cardiometabolic risk factors such as dyslipidemia, diabetes, obesity, and chronic kidney disease. Profiles from professional organisations and bibliometric databases describe his work as focusing on clinical trials of antithrombotic agents, lipid-lowering therapies, and glucose-lowering drugs in high-risk cardiovascular populations.

In addition to procedural and device-based interventional cardiology, he has co-authored professional society statements and guidelines in cardiology and stroke medicine, including recommendations on the early management of adults with ischaemic stroke that have been cited in subsequent American Heart Association and American Stroke Association documents. According to AD Scientific Index, he ranks among the top 0.1% percent of scientists worldwide in his field based on citation indicators.

=== Clinical trials ===
Bhatt has served as principal investigator, co-principal investigator, or steering-committee chair for multiple large, multicenter randomized controlled trials examining strategies to reduce cardiovascular events in high-risk patients. His work has included studies of sodium–glucose cotransporter2 (SGLT2) based therapies in patients with diabetes and either heart failure or chronic kidney disease, high-dose eicosapentaenoic acid (icosapent ethyl) in statin-treated patients with elevated triglycerides, intravenous antiplatelet therapy during percutaneous coronary intervention, and intensified oral antiplatelet regimens in patients with stable coronary artery disease and diabetes.

His publication record includes work on standardized bleeding definitions for cardiovascular trials, stroke and acute coronary syndrome guidelines, and large outcome studies in diabetes and chronic kidney disease, many of which are highly cited and have been referenced in clinical practice discussions and educational materials in cardiology and stroke medicine.

=== Selected trials ===
Recent trials as of 2025 include:

Name, sponsor, role	Description
SOLOIST, Sanofi Lexicon, Chair	Randomized controlled clinical trial (RCT) of sotagliflozin versus placebo in patients with diabetes and acute decompensated heart failure.
SCORED, Sanofi Lexicon, Chair	RCT of sotagliflozin versus placebo in patients with diabetes and at high cardiovascular risk.
REDUCE-IT (Reduction of Cardiovascular Events with EPA – Intervention Trial), Amarin, Chair and PI.	To determine definitively whether icosapent ethyl reduces cardiovascular risk in patients receiving intensive statin therapy and having elevated triglyceride levels.
CHAMPION PHOENIX, Chiesi, Co-Chair and Co-PI	Industry-sponsored Phase 3 trial of the intravenous antiplatelet agent cangrelor versus placebo in patients undergoing percutaneous coronary intervention.
THEMIS, AstraZeneca, Co-Chair and Co-PI	International, multicenter randomized trial of patients with diabetes and stable coronary artery disease who received ticagrelor or placebo on top of standard care including aspirin.

== Honors and awards ==
Brigham and Women's Hospital chose Bhatt in 2014 as the Eugene Braunwald Scholar and in 2016 presented him with the Research Mentor Award, and in 2017 he was awarded the Eugene Braunwald Teaching Award for Excellence in the Teaching of Clinical Cardiology. He was given the American College of Cardiology's Distinguished Mentor Award in 2018, and in 2019, the American Heart Association's Distinguished Scientist Award. He received NLA 's Honorary Lifetime Membership Award in 2021, and the Society for Cardiovascular Angiography and Interventions' Master Designation in 2022. In 2022, Research.com also recognized him with its Best Scientists award. He was listed by the Web of Science Group as a Highly Cited Researcher from 2014 to 2024. In 2025, he was a recipient of the Charaka Award, Issued by Medical Council of The Association of Indians in America. He has been a Castle Connolly Top Doctor 2014-2025 and Top Asian American and Pacific Islander Doctor 2023-2025.

== Publications ==
=== Books and book chapters ===
Bhatt is the Editor of the first and second editions of Cardiovascular Intervention: A Companion to Braunwald's Heart Disease and of Opie's Cardiovascular Drugs: A Companion to Braunwald's Heart Disease. He is one of the co-editors of Braunwald's Heart Disease. Elsevier credits him with a total of 11 titles as an author, chapter contributor, and Editor.

=== Editorial ===
Bhatt was Senior Associate Editor for News and Clinical Trials for ACC.org, member of the Healio | Cardiology Today Editorial Board, and Editor-in-Chief of the Journal of Invasive Cardiology, which also lists him as:

- Former Editor-in-Chief, Harvard Heart Letter
- Former guest editor, Journal of the American College of Cardiology
- Former chief medical editor, Cardiology Today's Intervention
- Deputy Editor, Clinical Cardiology.
- Deputy Editor, Progress in Cardiovascular Diseases

=== Articles ===
As of 2025, Google Scholar reports that he has been cited 300,459 times, has an h-index of 216 and an i10-index of 1305.

Bhatt has authored or co-authored over 2,250 publications and has been listed by the Web of Science Group as a highly cited researcher from 2014 to 2024.

Bhatt's most cited, peer-reviewed articles reported by Google Scholar include:

- Go AS, Mozaffarian D, Roger VL, Benjamin EJ, Berry JD, Borden WB, et al. Heart disease and stroke statistics—2013 update: a report from the American Heart Association. Circulation. 2013;127(1):e6-e245. PMID 23239837. Citations: 77,037.
- Wiviott SD, Raz I, Bonaca MP, Mosenzon O, Kato ET, Cahn A, et al. Dapagliflozin and cardiovascular outcomes in type 2 diabetes. N Engl J Med. 2019;380(4):347-357. PMID 30415602. Citations: 6,621.
- Lloyd-Jones DM, Hong Y, Labarthe D, Mozaffarian D, Appel LJ, Van Horn L, et al. Heart disease and stroke statistics 2005 update: a report from the American Heart Association. Circulation. 2005;111(10):e3-e244. PMID 15753209. Citations: 8,644.
- Mehran R, Rao SV, Bhatt DL, Gibson CM, Caixeta A, Eikelboom J, et al. Standardized bleeding definitions for cardiovascular clinical trials: a consensus report from the Bleeding Academic Research Consortium. Circulation. 2011;123(23):2736-2747. PMID 21670242. Citations: 4,620.
- Scirica BM, Bhatt DL, Braunwald E, Steg PG, Davidson J, Hirshberg B, et al. Saxagliptin and cardiovascular outcomes in patients with type 2 diabetes mellitus. N Engl J Med. 2013;369(14):1317-1326. PMID 23992601. Citations: 4,366.
- Adams HP Jr, Del Zoppo G, Alberts MJ, Bhatt DL, Brass L, Furlan A, et al. Guidelines for the early management of adults with ischemic stroke: a guideline from the American Heart Association/American Stroke Association Stroke Council. Stroke. 2007;38(5):1655-1711. PMID 17515473. Citations: 4,209.
- Bhatt DL, Fox KA, Hacke W, Berger PB, Black HR, Boden WE, et al. Clopidogrel and aspirin versus aspirin alone for the prevention of atherothrombotic events. N Engl J Med. 2006;354(16):1706-1717. PMID 16531616. Citations: 3,953.
- Bhatt DL, Steg PG, Miller M, Brinton EA, Jacobson TA, Ketchum SB, et al. Cardiovascular risk reduction with icosapent ethyl for hypertriglyceridemia. N Engl J Med. 2019;380(1):11-22. PMID 30415628. Citations: 3,275.
- Schwartz GG, Steg PG, Szarek M, Bhatt DL, Bittner VA, Diaz R, et al. Alirocumab and cardiovascular outcomes after acute coronary syndrome. N Engl J Med. 2018;379(22):2097-2107. PMID 30380328. Citations: 3,076.
- Schauer PR, Kashyap SR, Wolski K, Brethauer SA, Kirwan JP, Pothier CE, et al. Bariatric surgery versus intensive medical therapy in obese patients with diabetes. N Engl J Med. 2012;366(17):1567-1576. PMID 22455443. Citations: 2,979.
