= Valentín Fuster =

Spanish cardiologist (born 1943)

The Most Excellent The Marquess of Fuster GCA
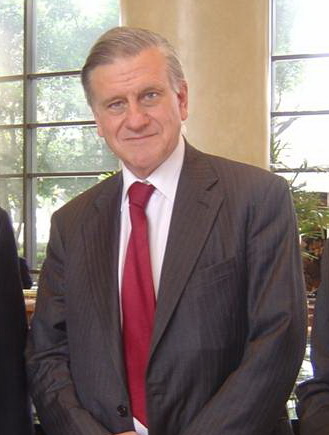
- Born: Valentín Fuster Carulla; 20 January 1943 (age 83); Barcelona, Spain
- Education: University of Barcelona; University of Edinburgh Medical School
- Occupation: Cardiologist
- Parent(s): Joaquín Fuster, Father
- Relatives: Marquess of Carulla, grandmother Joaquín Fuster, brother

Valentín Fuster Carulla, 1st Marquess of Fuster (born January 20, 1943) is a Spanish cardiologist and aristocrat.

He was editor-in-chief of the Journal of the American College of Cardiology (JACC), past President of the American Heart Association, past President of the World Heart Federation, and has been a member of the US National Academy of Medicine and Member of the European Horizon 2020 Scientific Panel of Health. In 2016 he co-chaired, with Jendayi Frazer, the Advisory Committee on The Role of the United States on Global Health.

Fuster serves as President of Mount Sinai Heart and Physician-in-Chief of The Mount Sinai Hospital, and Director of the Zena and Michael A. Wiener Cardiovascular Institute, the Marie-Josée and Henry R. Kravis Center for Cardiovascular Health, Richard Gorlin, MD/Heart Research Foundation, and Professor at Icahn School of Medicine at Mount Sinai. In October 2023 Mount Sinai Heart was renamed the Mount Sinai Fuster Heart Hospital. Deepak Bhatt succeeded Fuster in the role of director.

He serves in Madrid as the General Director of the National Centre for Cardiovascular Research (CNIC) and also chairs an international project, the SHE Foundation (Science for Health and Education). In 2014, King Juan Carlos I of Spain granted him the title of Marquis for his "outstanding and unceasing research efforts and his educational outreach work".

== Life and career ==
Fuster was born in Barcelona, Spain. He is the son of a psychiatrist, and his brother is a neuroscientist. In Spain he competed in tennis at a national level. Pedro Farreras Valentí, the author of the widely used Spanish textbook Farreras-Rozman Internal Medicine, encouraged Fuster to study cardiology.

Fuster graduated first in his class with an MD from University of Barcelona in 1967. He completed an internship at the Hospital Clinic in Barcelona, then attended University of Edinburgh Medical School for a PhD on the role of platelets in myocardial infarction.

Fuster served as a Research Fellow in Cardiology at the Royal Infirmary of Edinburgh from 1968 to 1971 After completing his PhD in 1971 from the University of Edinburgh Medical School. Fuster spent several years at the Mayo Clinic, first as a resident and later as Professor of Medicine and Consultant in Cardiology. In 1981, he became head of cardiology at Mount Sinai School of Medicine. From 1991 to 1994, he was Mallinckrodt Professor of Medicine at Harvard Medical School and Chief of Cardiology at the Massachusetts General Hospital. He returned to Mount Sinai in 1994 as Director of the Zena and Michael A. Wiener Cardiovascular Institute and in 2006 named the Director of Mount Sinai Heart, and in 2022, he was appointed president.

Fuster serves as physician-in-chief and President of Mount Sinai Heart, the Zena and Michael A. Wiener Cardiovascular Institute and the Marie-Josee and Henry R. Kravis Center for Cardiovascular Health. He is also the Richard Gorlin, MD/Heart Research Foundation Professor at Icahn School of Medicine at Mount Sinai. Fuster was the President of Science, and is now the General Director of the Centro Nacional de Investigaciones Cardiovasculares Carlos III (CNIC) in Madrid, (Spain).

Fuster was elected editor-in-chief at the Journal of the American College of Cardiology in 2014. Former positions include President of the American Heart Association, past president of the World Heart Federation, member of the Institute of Medicine of the National Academy of Sciences where he serves as Chair of the Committee on Preventing the Global Epidemic of Cardiovascular Disease, former member of the National Heart, Lung, and Blood Institute Advisory Council, and former Chairman of the Fellowship Training Directors Program of the American College of Cardiology. He has thirty-four university Honorary Doctorates. According to Google Scholar, his peer-reviewed publications, as of 2020, have been cited 319,356. His h-index is 209 and i10-index is 1,206.

He was the inspiration for a character on the Spanish version of Sesame Street named "Valentin Ruster" that educated children in healthier lifestyles through exercise and healthy diet.

=== Honors and awards ===
- 1992 Andreas Gruntzig Award of the International Society of Interventionalists (Paris)
- 1993 Distinguished Scientist Award, American College of Cardiology
- 1996 Principe de Asturias Award of Science and Technology, Fundacion Principe de Asturias, Oviedo, Spain
- 2001 James B. Herrick Award, Council of Clinical Cardiology of the American Heart Association
- 2005 2009 Distinguished Researcher Award, Interamerican Society of Cardiology
- 2008 Polzer Prize, European Academy of Science and Arts
- 2011 The LeFoulon Delalande Grand Prize, Institute of France, Paris, France
- 2012 AHA Research Achievement Award, Los Angeles, CA
- 2014 Created Marquess of Fuster in the Spanish nobility by King Juan Carlos I.
- 2015 Grand Cross of the Civil Order of Health
- 2017 Grand Cross of the Civil Order of Alfonso X, the Wise
- 2020 Prince Mahidol Award in Medicine
- 2026 Doctor Honoris Causa and Presidential Honorary, Cyprus

== Scientific investigator ==
=== Contributions in translational medicine ===
Chronology

Fuster’s contributions for disease-to-health transitions encompass five phases leading to 4 guidelines Class I:

1980s: Demonstrating the role of platelets in coronary artery bypass graft (CABG) occlusion based on imaging studies in dogs, and a pioneering trial of aspirin in human atherothrombotic disease.

1990s: Demonstrating that acute coronary events arise from small plaques, explaining their unpredictability, and developing diagnostic MRI imaging to characterize these “vulnerable plaques” and inhibiting post coronary angioplasty (PCI) fibrosis in pigs by Rapamycin, prompting the introduction of drug-eluting stents (DES) to prevent PCI restenosis.

2000s: Following upon experience with CABG and DES for revascularization in patients with diabetes and multivessel coronary disease changing American and European practice guidelines.

2010s: To improve poor medication adherence, as observed in FREEDOM and other studies, a fixed-dose polypill (aspirin, ramipril and statin) was developed, the first approved for secondary prevention in 40 countries.

2015 to present (2021): Established the predictive value of identifying atherosclerotic burden by noninvasive imaging (3D ultrasound, EBCT, PET, MRI) and genetics in 4 studies of 11,000 asymptomatic adults. Thus, in collaboration with the producers of Sesame Street television, conducted randomized studies of 3,000 children, 2,000 parents and 300 teachers in Colombia, Spain and Harlem (New York). Sixty hours of health education over six months showed a significant impact on knowledge, attitude, habits and weight within three years.

== Books ==
=== Author ===
- Hurst's the Heart Manual of Cardiology, 12th Edition by Robert O'Rourke, Richard Walsh and Valentin Fuster (Jan 27, 2009) ISBN 0-071-84324-8
- The Heart Manual: My Scientific Advice for Eating Better, Feeling Better, and Living a Stress-Free Life Now by Valentin Fuster (Feb 2, 2010) ISBN 0-061-76591-0
- The AHA Guidelines and Scientific Statements Handbook (Fuster, The AHA Guidelines And Scientific Statements Handbook) by Valentin Fuster (Jan 6, 2009)
- Atherothrombosis and Coronary Artery Disease by Valentin Fuster, Eric J. Topol and Elizabeth G. Nabel (Nov 8, 2004)
- Platelets in Thrombotic and Non-Thrombotic Disorders Pathophysiology, Pharmacology and Therapeutics Paolo Gresele, Clive P. Page, Valentin Fuster, Jos Vermylen Hardback (ISBN 9780521802611)
- Thrombosis in Cardiovascular Disorders [Hardcover] Valentin Fuster (Author), Marc Verstraete (Author)
- Update on Coronary Risk Factors, An Issue of Medical Clinics of North America [Hardcover] Valentin Fuster, MD, PhD (Author), and Jagat Narula
- La Ciencia de la Salud: Mis consejos para una vida sana (Spanish Edition) by Valentin Fuster (Dec 26, 2007) ISBN 8-408-06620-X
- Cardiovascular Thrombosis: Thrombocardiology and Thromboneurology [Hardcover] Marc Verstraete (Author), Valentin Fuster (Author), Fuster (Author)
- La ciencia y la vida/ Science And Life (Spanish Edition) [Paperback] Valentin Fuster (Author), Jose Luis Sampedro (Author)
- [Cardiovascular Magnetic Resonance: Established and Emerging Applications [Hardcover] Albert Lardo (Author), Zahi Fayad (Author), Nicolas Chronos (Author), Valentin Fuster (Author)
- La pequeña ciencia de la salud [Perfect Paperback] Valentin Fuster (Author)
- Monstruos supersanos [Perfect Paperback] Valentin Fuster (Author)
- La cocina de la salud by Valentín Fuster / Ferran Adrià / Josep Corbella (2010)
- La vostra salute mi sta a cuore [Perfect Paperback] Josep Corbella Valentín Fuster
- La buona cucina della salute. La ricetta di un famoso chef e di un grande medico per vivere bene senza rinunce [Perfect Paperback] Valentin Fuster, Josep Corbella Ferran Adrià (Author)
- El Círculo de la motivación [Planeta de Libros] Valentín Fuster con la colaboracíon de Emma Reverter ISBN 1-697-11266-8

=== Editor ===
- The Vulnerable Atherosclerotic Plaque: Understanding, Identification and Modification [Hardcover] Valentin Fuster (Editor)
- Evolving Challenges in Promoting Cardiovascular Health by Annals of the New York Academy of Sciences Editorial Staff, Valentin Fuster (Editor) May 2012, Paperback
- Assessing and Modifying the Vulnerable Atherosclerotic Plaque by Valentin Fuster (Editor) with William Insull Jr., MD June 2002, Hardcover
- Oxidative Stress and Cardiac Failure by Marrick Kukin (Editor), Valentin Fuster (Editor) October 2002, Hardcover
- Platelets in Hematologic and Cardiovascular Disorders: A Clinical Handbook [Hardcover] Paolo Gresele (Editor), Valentin Fuster (Editor), Jose A. Lopez (Editor), Clive P. Page (Editor), Jos Vermylen (Editor)
- Promoting Cardiovascular Health in the Developing World: A Critical Challenge to Achieve Global Health] [Paperback] Committee on Preventing the Global Epidemic of Cardiovascular Disease: Meeting the Challenges in Developing Countries (Author), Institute of Medicine (Author), Valentin Fuster (Editor), Bridget B. Kelly (Editor)
- Syndromes of Atherosclerosis: Correlations of Clinical Imaging and Pathology [Hardcover] Valentin Fuster (Editor)
- Efficacy of Myocardial Infarction Therapy [Hardcover] Valentin Fuster (Editor)
- Editor-in-chief of Nature Reviews Cardiology, April 2009
