= Henrik Sørensen (field hockey) =

Danish field hockey player (1924–2013)

Personal information
- Full name: Poul Henrik Sørensen
- Nationality: Danish
- Born: 21 August 1924 Kalundborg, Denmark
- Died: 8 July 2013 (aged 88)

Sport
- Sport: Field hockey

Henrik Sørensen (21 August 1924 – 8 July 2013) was a Danish field hockey player. He competed in the men's tournament at the 1948 Summer Olympics.
