= Jean-Jacques Enderle =

Belgian ice hockey player (1920–1976)

Personal information
- Nationality: Belgian
- Born: 9 January 1920 Brussels, Belgium
- Died: 24 April 1976 (aged 56)

Sport
- Sport: Field hockey

Jean-Jacques Enderle (9 January 1920 – 24 April 1976) was a Belgian field hockey player. He competed at the 1948 Summer Olympics, the 1952 Summer Olympics and the 1956 Summer Olympics.
