= William Wilson (field hockey) =

American hockey player (1917–1984)

Personal information
- Full name: William Andrews Wilson
- Born: October 26, 1917 New York City, U.S.
- Died: February 27, 1984 (aged 66) Vieques, Puerto Rico, Puerto Rico

Sport
- Sport: Field hockey

William Andrews Wilson (October 26, 1917 – February 27, 1984) was an American field hockey player. He competed in the men's tournament at the 1948 Summer Olympics.
