= Iftikhar Ahmed Shah =

Pakistani swimmer (1928–2020)

Personal information
- Born: 1928
- Died: 2020 (aged 91–92)

Sport
- Sport: Swimming

Iftikhar Ahmed Shah (1928–2020) was a Pakistani swimmer. He competed in two events at the 1948 Summer Olympics.
