= Anwar Ahmed Khan =

Pakistani field hockey player

Personal information
- Born: 24 September 1933 Bhopal, British India
- Died: 2 May 2014 (aged 80) Karachi, Pakistan
- Height: 1.79 m (5 ft 10 in)
- Weight: 82 kg (181 lb)

Sport
- Sport: Field hockey
Medal record
Representing Pakistan
Olympic Games
Gold medal – first place	1960 Rome	Team
Silver medal – second place	1956 Melbourne	Team
Silver medal – second place	1964 Tokyo	Team
Asian Games
Gold medal – first place	1958 Tokyo	Team
Gold medal – first place	1962 Jakarta	Team

Anwar Ahmed "Anu" Khan (24 September 1933 – 2 May 2014) was a Pakistani field hockey player who won an Olympic gold medal at the 1960 Summer Olympics and two silver medals at the 1956 and 1964 Olympics, as well as gold medals at the Asian Games in 1958 and 1962. An exceptional center half, he is known as the Rock of Gibraltar.

== Early life and career ==
Khan was born in India to His Highness Mohammad Hashim Khan and her Highness Noor Jehan begum, a fifth child among five brothers and one sister. He started playing hockey in India and continued after his family moved to Karachi, Pakistan, in 1950–51, becoming a national team member in 1954. He retired from competitions in 1966, and then until 1993 worked at the Pakistan Customs, where he was employed since 1955. In parallel, he assisted the Pakistan Hockey Federation as manager of senior and junior teams and member of selection committee. He helped the senior team to win a silver at the 1975 World Cup, a gold at the 1974 Asian Games, and a silver at the 1986 Asian Games, whereas the junior team won bronze at the 1982 World Cup.

== Awards and recognition ==
- Tamgha-e-Imtiaz Award (Medal of Excellence Award) by the President of Pakistan

== Autobiography ==
'Anwar: The autobiography of Anwar Ahmad Khan' was published in 1990.
