= Noel Hickey (footballer) =

Australian rules footballer

Personal information
- Full name: Noel Hickey
- Born: 10 January 1925
- Died: 1 October 1996 (aged 71)
- Height: 178 cm (5 ft 10 in)
- Weight: 73 kg (161 lb)

Playing career^{1}
Years	Club	Games (Goals)
1945–47	Hawthorn	6 (1)
- ^{1} Playing statistics correct to the end of 1947.

Noel Hickey (10 January 1925 – 1 October 1996) was an Australian rules footballer who played with Hawthorn in the Victorian Football League (VFL).
