= Sultan Karim Ali =

Pakistani swimmer (born 1931)

Personal information
- Born: 1931

Sport
- Sport: Swimming

Sultan Karim Ali, also written as Karim Ali Sultan (born 1931), is a Pakistani former swimmer. He competed in two events at the 1948 Summer Olympics.

== Sources ==
- Phillips, Bob (2007). The 1948 Olympics: How London Rescued the Games. SportsBooks. ISBN 978-1-899807-54-3.
