= Henry Goode =

American field hockey player (1918–2000)

Personal information
- Full name: Henry Russell Goode
- Born: June 7, 1918 New York City, U.S.
- Died: April 30, 2000 (aged 81) Larchmont, New York, U.S.

Sport
- Sport: Field hockey

Henry Russell Goode (June 7, 1918 – April 30, 2000) was an American field hockey player. He competed in the men's tournament at the 1948 Summer Olympics.
