= Abdul Ghafoor Khan Mayo =

Pakistani politician

Member of the Provincial Assembly of the Punjab
- In office 31 May 2013 – 31 May 2018
- Constituency: PP-163 Lahore-XII
- In office 13 February 2008 – 13 February 2013
- Constituency: PP-163 Lahore-XII
- In office 20 October 2002 – 20 October 2007
- Constituency: PP-163 Lahore-XII

Personal details
- Born: 25 March 1976 (age 50)
- Party: PPP (2023-present)
- Other political affiliations: PMLN (1997–2023)

Abdul Gafoor Khan Mayo is the former Food Minister for Punjab, Pakistan. He has been elected to the Provincial Assembly of the Punjab three times. Gafoor Mayo has also repeatedly been in the news. Once, he was charged with manhandling custom officials at Lahore airport. Earlier during his second tenure as MPA in 2010, he was in newspapers for beating police officer at Mall Road. Abdul Ghafoor Mayo is notoriously famous for short temper.

He usually exchanges harsh words with opponents and at times even tries to go physical. He has been elected three times to Provincial Assembly, once from Nawaz Sharif home constituency Model Town, and later on from other home constituency of Nawaz Sharif that is Raiwind.
