= Philippe Reynaud =

French field hockey player

Philippe Reynaud (3 February 1922 – 20 November 2018) was a French former field hockey player who competed in the 1948 Summer Olympics, in the 1952 Summer Olympics, and in the 1960 Summer Olympics.
