= Karl Vogt (field hockey) =

Swiss hockey player

Personal information
- Nationality: Swiss

Sport
- Sport: Field hockey

Karl Vogt was a Swiss field hockey player. He competed in the men's tournament at the 1948 Summer Olympics.
