= Abdul Ghafoor (sprinter) =

Afghan sprinter (born 1970)

Abdul Ghafoor (born 5 March 1970) is a former Afghan sprinter who competed in the men's 100m competition at the 1996 Summer Olympics. He recorded a 12.20, not enough to qualify for the next round past the heats.
