= Emil Grub =

Swiss field hockey player

Personal information
- Nationality: Swiss
- Born: 17 November 1920 Rapperswil, Switzerland

Sport
- Sport: Field hockey

Emil Grub (born 17 November 1920) was a Swiss field hockey player. He competed in the men's tournament at the 1948 Summer Olympics.
