= Syed Muhammad Salim =

Pakistani hockey player (1909–1992)

Personal information
- Full name: Syed Muhammad Salim Yazdani
- Born: 5 September 1909 Lahore, British India
- Died: 1 January 1992 (aged 82)

Sport
- Sport: Field hockey
- Position: Goalkeeper
- Updated on 8 June 2024

Syed Muhammad Salim (Urdu: سید محمد سلیم; 5 September 1909 – 1 January 1992) was a Pakistani Olympic field hockey player. He played seven matches for Pakistan's national hockey team. He was part of the Pakistan team in field hockey at the 1948 Summer Olympics, where the team reached the hockey semifinals undefeated, but their campaign ended there at the hands of Britain. Salim died on 1 January 1992, at the age of 82.

== See also ==
- Field hockey at the 1948 Summer Olympics – Men's team squads
- List of Pakistani field hockey players
