= Frederick Hewitt (field hockey) =

American field hockey player (1916–2010)

Personal information
- Full name: Frederic Maxcy Hewitt
- Born: September 16, 1916 Baltimore, Maryland, U.S.
- Died: September 26, 2010 (aged 94) Annapolis, Maryland, U.S.

Sport
- Sport: Field hockey

Frederic Maxcy Hewitt (September 16, 1916 – September 26, 2010) was an American field hockey player. He competed in the men's tournament at the 1948 Summer Olympics.
