= Hugo Walser (field hockey) =

Swiss field hockey player (1911–1971)

Personal information
- Nationality: Swiss
- Born: 1911
- Died: 13 December 1971 (aged 59–60)

Sport
- Sport: Field hockey

Hugo Walser (1911 – 13 December 1971) was a Swiss field hockey player. He competed in the men's tournament at the 1948 Summer Olympics.
