= Pedro Farreras =

Spanish field hockey player (1916–1968)

Personal information
- Full name: Pedro Farreras Valenti
- Nationality: Spanish
- Born: 4 April 1916 Barcelona, Spain
- Died: 17 May 1968 (aged 52) Barcelona, Spain

Sport
- Sport: Field hockey
- Club: Real Club de Polo

Pedro Farreras Valenti (4 April 1916 – 17 May 1968) was a Spanish doctor and field hockey player.

His father, Pedro Farreras Sampere, was a noted veterinarian. Farreras Valenti competed in the men's tournament at the 1948 Summer Olympics. Between 1947 and 1958 he was an adjunct professor at the Faculty of Medicine of Barcelona in the chair directed by Agustín Pedro Pons, later he was a professor of pathology and medical clinic at the medical faculties of Cádiz (1959-1960) and Salamanca (1960-1964).

He held the presidency of the Spanish Society of Internal Medicine and was the author of numerous books and articles related to medicine, notably the 3rd through 7th editions of the Compendium of Medical Pathology and Clinical Therapeuti, published by the Marín publishing house. This book, widely used for the training of medical students in Spain, continues to be published today under the title Farreras-Rozman Medicina Interna, with its latest edition being the 19th (May 2020) edited by Professor Ciril Rozman and co-edited by Professor Francesc Cardellach. He was the mentor of cardiologist Valentín Fuster.

He died of a heart attack in 1968.
