= Bill Elsworth =

Australian rules footballer

Personal information
- Full name: Bill Elsworth
- Born: 2 August 1936
- Died: 25 October 1996 (aged 60)
- Original team: Heidelberg
- Height: 173 cm (5 ft 8 in)
- Weight: 76 kg (168 lb)

Playing career^{1}
Years	Club	Games (Goals)
1955–56	Hawthorn	10 (4)
- ^{1} Playing statistics correct to the end of 1956.

Bill Elsworth (2 August 1936 – 25 October 1996) was an Australian rules footballer who played with Hawthorn in the Victorian Football League (VFL).
