= Josef Rippstein =

Swiss hockey player

Personal information
- Nationality: Swiss
- Born: 1916

Sport
- Sport: Field hockey

Josef Rippstein (born 1916, date of death unknown) was a Swiss field hockey player. He competed in the men's tournament at the 1948 Summer Olympics.
