= Zahid Pirzada =

Pakistani field hockey player

Zahid Pirzad (born 1 August 1958, Karachi, Pakistan) is a former Pakistani field hockey player. He played center halfback. He made his international debut for Pakistan in 1982 against Japan in which Pakistan won the gold medal.

In 1983, Pirzada represented Pakistan in Germany.

He retired the team in 1987 and later he participated in the "Veterans' World Cup 2002" hockey tournament in Kuala Lumpur and won the gold medal.

Pirzada captained the Pakistan Army Hockey Team from 1981 to 1987.
