= José Delaval =

Belgian hockey player (born 1921)

Personal information
- Full name: Nicolas Lambert José Delaval
- Nationality: Belgian
- Born: 27 March 1921 Brussels, Belgium

Sport
- Sport: Field hockey

Nicolas Lambert José Delaval (born 27 March 1921, date of death unknown) was a Belgian field hockey player. He competed at the 1948 Summer Olympics and the 1952 Summer Olympics.
