= Harold Mechelynck =

Belgian field hockey player

Personal information
- Nationality: Belgian
- Born: 1 July 1924 Ghent, Belgium
- Died: September 2013 (aged 89)

Sport
- Sport: Field hockey

Harold Mechelynck (1 July 1924 – September 2013) was a Belgian field hockey player. He competed at the 1948 Summer Olympics and the 1952 Summer Olympics.
