= Fritz Stühlinger =

Swiss field hockey player

Personal information
- Nationality: Swiss
- Born: 21 January 1924
- Died: 17 November 1963 (aged 39)

Sport
- Sport: Field hockey

Fritz Stühlinger (21 January 1924 – 17 November 1963) was a Swiss field hockey player. He competed at the 1948 Summer Olympics and the 1952 Summer Olympics.
