= Lucien Van Weydeveld =

Belgian hockey player

Personal information
- Nationality: Belgian
- Born: 25 November 1926 Molenbeek-Saint-Jean, Belgium

Sport
- Sport: Field hockey

Lucien Van Weydeveld (born 25 November 1926, date of death unknown) was a Belgian field hockey player. He competed at the 1948 Summer Olympics and the 1952 Summer Olympics.
