= Jaffar Ali Shah =

Pakistani swimmer (born 1930)

Personal information
- Born: 1930

Sport
- Sport: Swimming

Jaffar Ali Shah (born 1930) is a Pakistani former swimmer. He competed in two events at the 1948 Summer Olympics.
