= Zafar Ali Zafari =

Pakistani field hockey player (1930–2021)

Zafar Ali Zafari (1930 – 2 April 2021) was a Pakistani field hockey player, coach, and military officer in Pakistan Army.

He was a member of the Pakistan national hockey team which won the country's first-ever Olympic gold in 1960, but he did not play in the tournament.

He retired from military service in 1980 as a lieutenant colonel. His son, Amir Zafar, has also played for the Pakistan national field hockey team.
