= Amir Zafar =

Pakistani field hockey player (born 1965)

Personal information
- Nationality: Pakistani
- Born: 30 January 1965 (age 61) Rawalpindi, Pakistan

Sport
- Sport: Field hockey

Amir Zafar (born 30 January 1965) is a Pakistani former field hockey player. He competed in the men's tournament at the 1988 Summer Olympics. His father, Zafar Ali Zafari, also played field hockey for the Pakistan national hockey team.
