= Lala Abdul Rashid =

Pakistani field hockey player

Lala Abdul Rashif
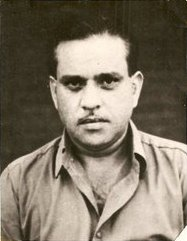

Personal information
- Born: 1 June 1922 Rawalpindi, Punjab Province, British India (now Pakistan)
- Died: 8 April 1988 (aged 65) Rawalpindi, Punjab, Pakistan
- Height: 169 cm (5 ft 7 in)
- Weight: 201 lb (91 kg)

Sport
- Sport: Field hockey
Medal record
Men's field hockey
Representing Pakistan
Gold medal – first place	1960 Summer Olympics	Team competition

Lala Abdul Rashid or Abdul Rashid (1 June 1922 – 8 March 1988) was a field hockey goalkeeper and a member of Pakistan's gold medal winning 1960 Olympic field hockey team.

== Early life and education ==
Born in Rawalpindi, British India on 1 June 1922, he originated from a Kashmiri Butt family whose parents migrated from Kashmir in the early 1900s. He studied at Denny's High School in Rawalpindi and then joined Gordon College in the same city, where he played hockey. After graduation, he was selected to play for University of Punjab, Lahore and played for them in 1942.

== International career ==
Abdul Rashid represented Pakistan at the Olympics and was part of the team that won the gold medal at the 1960 Rome Olympics. During the whole tournament only one goal was scored against Pakistan whereas Lala Abdul Rashid was able to stop all the scoring efforts by other teams. Pakistan won the Olympics gold in field hockey for the first time since independence of Pakistan in 1947. Abdul Rashid also served as the team coach of Pakistan in the late 1970s. He also held the position of Asian Hockey Federation general manager for a few months, but quickly stepped down. He was highly respected in the hockey world and was instrumental in raising field hockey's profile to an international level, winning an emerging player award in 1960. Abdul Rashid died in Rawalpindi on 8 March 1988 at the age of 65.

== Awards and recognition ==
- Pride of Performance Award by the President of Pakistan in 1970.

== See also ==
- Muhammad Rashid (field hockey, born 1941)
