= Pierre Pasche =

Swiss hockey player (1909–1988)

Personal information
- Nationality: Swiss
- Born: 27 September 1909
- Died: 14 April 1988 (aged 78)

Sport
- Sport: Field hockey

Pierre Pasche (27 September 1909 – 14 April 1988) was a Swiss field hockey player. He competed in the men's tournament at the 1948 Summer Olympics. Pazche died on 14 April 1988, at the age of 78.
