= Jentzsch =

Jentzsch is a German surname. Notable people with the surname include:

- Heber Jentzsch (1935–2026), American Scientologist
- Heinz Jentzsch (1920–2012), German horse trainer
- Herlind Jentzsch (1928–2019), the mother of Angela Merkel
- Marco Jentzsch (born 1974), German operatic tenor
- Olaf Jentzsch (born 1958), German racing cyclist
- Simon Jentzsch (born 1976), German footballer
- Willi Jentzsch (1886–1936), father of Herlind and Merkel's grandfather
