= Abdul Ghafar al-Akhras =

Abdul Ghafar al-Akhras عبد الغفار الأخرس

Personal life
- Born: 1804 Mosul, Mosul Vilayet, Ottoman Empire
- Died: 1873 (aged 68–69) Basra, Basra Vilayet, Ottoman Empire
- Resting place: Basra
- Notable work: Collection of poems
- Occupation: poet, calligrapher

Religious life
- Religion: Islam
- Denomination: Sunni Islam

Abdul Ghafar al-Akhras (Arabic: عبد الغفار الأخرس) (1804–1873), known as al-Akhras ('the mute'), was an Ottoman poet and calligrapher, born in Mosul who moved to live in Baghdad. He attended the seminar of Mahmud al-Alusi (Mufti of Ottoman Iraq). During his life in Baghdad, al-Akhras was an enemy of "Omar bin Ramadan al-Hiti" another poet and calligrapher. They satirized each other.

Al-Akhras authored many famous jokes and proverbs. He wrote "Abdul Ghani Al Jamil's collection of poems". Al-Akhras, Mohammed Saeed Al-Habboubi, and Abdul Baqi Al-Omari are considered the best 19th century Ottoman-Iraqi poets. He was buried in Basra in 1875.
