= Kurt Orban =

American hockey player (1916–2006)

Personal information
- Born: August 6, 1916 New York City, U.S.
- Died: February 8, 2006 (aged 89) Las Vegas, Nevada, U.S.

Sport
- Sport: Field hockey

Kurt Orban (August 6, 1916 – February 8, 2006) was an American field hockey player. He competed at the 1948 Summer Olympics and the 1956 Summer Olympics.
