= Mahmood Hussain (field hockey) =

Pakistani field hockey player

Mahmood Hussain was a Pakistani field hockey player, who played for the international side between 1984 and 1990.

He was born at Sialkot, and played hockey at the Forward position. He played 27 international matches, scoring 13 goals. He is the brother of ex-Pakistan hockey captain Manzoor Hussain Junior.
