= Roland Jenzer =

Swiss hockey player

Personal information
- Nationality: Swiss
- Born: 13 August 1921
- Died: 22 October 2013 (aged 92)

Sport
- Sport: Field hockey

Roland Jenzer (13 August 1921 – 22 October 2013) was a Swiss field hockey player. He competed in the men's tournament at the 1948 Summer Olympics.
