= Muhammad Rashid (field hockey, born 1941) =

Pakistani field hockey player

- Muhammad Rashid by Ahmet Abdulaziz

Personal information
- Born: 14 April 1941 Rawalpindi
- Died: 26 January 2009 (aged 67) Rawalpindi
- Resting place: Harley Street Grveyard, Rawalpindi
- Height: 181 cm (5 ft 11 in)
- Weight: 72 kg (159 lb)

Sport
- Sport: Field hockey
Medal record
Representing Pakistan
Olympic Games
Silver medal – second place	1964 Tokyo	Team competition
Asian Games
Silver medal – second place	1966 Bangkok	Team competition

Muhammad Rashid, known as Rashid Senior, (14 April 1941 – 26 January 2009) was a field hockey player from Pakistan. In certain books and other publications, besides on some websites, his name has been shown as Addul Rashid or Muhammad Abdul Rashid which is incorrect. He played in 1964 Summer Olympics and 1966 Asian Games. Pakistan won silver medal at both these events.

== Suffix Senior ==
In 1968, another player Abdul Rashid (field hockey, born 1947) also started playing in the Pakistan hockey team. Therefore, to differentiate between them, suffixes 'Senior' and 'Junior' were added to their names and they were then on called Rashid Senior and Rashid Junior. Both played together in a number of international matches between 1968 and 1969.

== Death ==
Muhammad Rashid died on 26 January 2009 in Rawalpindi. He was laid to rest in the metropolitan's Harley Street Graveyard.

== See also ==
- Abdul Rahshid I
