= Egon Johansen (field hockey) =

Danish field hockey player

Personal information
- Nationality: Danish
- Born: 9 November 1919 Kalundborg, Denmark
- Died: 11 May 1999 (aged 79) Kalundborg, Denmark

Sport
- Sport: Field hockey

Egon Johansen (9 November 1919 – 11 May 1999) was a Danish field hockey player. He competed in the men's tournament at the 1948 Summer Olympics.
