= Anwar Baig =

Pakistani field hockey player (born 1924)

Anwar Baig انور بیگ
Personal information
- Full name: Muhammad Anwar Baig Mughal
- Born: November 1924 Peshawar, British India

Sport
- Country: Pakistan
- Sport: Men's field hockey

Muhammad Anwar Baig Mughal (born November 1924) was a Pakistani field hockey player who was a member of the Pakistan men's national field hockey team. He played six matches for Pakistan at the 1948 Summer Olympics, which placed fourth in the hockey competition.

== See also ==
- Field hockey at the 1948 Summer Olympics – Men's team squads
