= Jacques Kielbaey =

Belgian field hockey player

Personal information
- Nationality: Belgian
- Born: 28 July 1920 Anderlecht, Belgium
- Died: 6 October 1996 (aged 76)

Sport
- Sport: Field hockey

Jacques Kielbaey (28 July 1920 – 6 October 1996) was a Belgian field hockey player. He competed in the men's tournament at the 1948 Summer Olympics.
