= John Renwick (field hockey) =

American hockey player

Personal information
- Born: May 13, 1921 New York City, United States
- Died: January 8, 2009 (aged 87) Bedford, New York, United States

Sport
- Sport: Field hockey

John Renwick (May 13, 1921 – January 8, 2009) was an American field hockey player. He competed in the men's tournament at the 1948 Summer Olympics.
