= Riaz-ud-Din (field hockey) =

Pakistani hockey player

Personal information
- Nationality: Pakistani
- Born: 24 February 1942 Quetta, British India
- Died: 15 January 2001 (aged 58)

Sport
- Sport: Field hockey

Riaz-ud-Din (24 February 1942 – 15 January 2001) was a Pakistani field hockey player. He competed at the 1968 Summer Olympics, winning the gold medal.
