= Masood Ahmed Khan =

Pakistani field hockey player (born 1918)

Masood Ahmed
Personal information
- Nationality: Pakistan
- Born: June 1918 Amritsar, British India

Sport
- Sport: Field hockey

Masood Ahmed Khan (born June 1918, date of death unknown) was a Pakistani field hockey player. He competed in the 1948 Summer Olympics, where the national team placed fourth in the hockey competition.
