= Abdul Qayyum Khan (field hockey) =

Pakistani field hockey player (born 1922)

Personal information
- Nationality: Pakistani
- Born: November 1922 Delhi, British India

Sport
- Sport: Field hockey

Abdul Qayyum Khan (born November 1922) was a Pakistani field hockey player. He competed in the men's tournament at the 1948 Summer Olympics, where the Pakistan hockey team finished fourth at the nation's inaugural Olympics.
