= Remat Ullah Sheikh =

Pakistani hockey player (born 1921)

Personal information
- Nationality: Pakistani
- Born: February 1921 Rawalpindi, British India

Sport
- Sport: Field hockey

Remat Ullah Sheikh (born February 1921) was a Pakistani field hockey player who represented the country internationally. He was part of Pakistan's inaugural Olympic campaign in field hockey at the 1948 Summer Olympics, where the team reached the hockey semifinals undefeated, but was defeated at that stage.
