= Muhammad Abdul Razzaq =

Pakistani field hockey player (born 1921)

Personal information
- Nationality: Pakistani
- Born: 1921 Faisalabad, British India

Sport
- Sport: Field hockey

Muhammad Abdul Razzaq (born 1921) is a Pakistani field hockey player. He competed in the 1948 Summer Olympics, where the Pakistan team got the fourth position in the hockey tournament in the nation's inaugural Olympics.
