= Mahmood-ul Hassan =

Pakistani field hockey player

Personal information
- Nationality: British Indian (1938–1947); Pakistani (1947–1988)
- Born: 8 August 1924 Montgomery, British India
- Died: 18 February 1988 (aged 63) Karachi, Pakistan

Sport
- Sport: Field hockey

Mahmood-ul Hassan (/ˈhʌsən/ HUSS-ən; 8 August 1924 – 18 February 1988) was a Pakistani field hockey player. He competed in the field hockey tournament for Pakistan at the 1948 Summer Olympics and the 1952 Summer Olympics. The Pakistan hockey team placed fourth in both Olympics. His son, Ayaz Mahmood, also represented Pakistan internationally in field hockey as a centre-half and was a member of their 1984 Olympics team that reclaimed the Olympic hockey gold after 16 years.
