= Khawaja Muhammad Taqi =

Pakistani hockey player (born 1918)

Personal information
- Nationality: Pakistani
- Born: 1918 Delhi, British India

Sport
- Sport: Field hockey

Khawaja Muhammad Taqi (born 1918, date of death unknown) was a Pakistani field hockey player. He competed in the men's tournament at the 1948 Summer Olympics in London. After retiring as a player, he became the national hockey coach, coaching the Pakistan Olympic field hockey team in the 1968 Summer Olympics in Mexico City, winning the country's first Olympic gold medal. He also coached the Indonesian hockey team for the 1958 Asian Games in Tokyo, which was the only team to score a goal against the Pakistan team, the eventual gold medal winners.
