= Abdul Ghafoor Khan =

Pakistani field hockey player (born 1920)

Personal information
- Nationality: Pakistani
- Born: 1920 Faisalabad, British India

Sport
- Sport: Field hockey

Abdul Ghafoor Khan (born 1920) was a Pakistani field hockey player. He competed in the men's tournament at the 1948 Summer Olympics, with his team placing fourth in the nation's inaugural Olympic appearance.
