= Argentina at the 1948 Summer Olympics =

- IOC code: ARG
- NOC: Argentine Olympic Committee

in London
- Competitors: 199 (188 men and 11 women) in 16 sports
- Flag bearer: Alfredo Yantorno
- Medals Ranked 13th: Gold 3 Silver 3 Bronze 1 Total 7

Summer Olympics appearances (overview)
- 1900; 1904; 1908; 1912; 1920; 1924; 1928; 1932; 1936; 1948; 1952; 1956; 1960; 1964; 1968; 1972; 1976; 1980; 1984; 1988; 1992; 1996; 2000; 2004; 2008; 2012; 2016; 2020; 2024; 2028

Argentina at the 1948 Summer Olympics in London, England was the nation's eighth appearance out of eleven editions of the Summer Olympic Games. Argentina sent to the 1948 Summer Olympics its fifth national team, under the auspices of the Argentine Olympic Committee (Comité Olímpico Argentino) of 199 athletes (188 men and 11 women) who competed in 101 events in 16 sports. It would not be until the 2016 Summer Olympics that the athlete delegation were surpassed. The medals haul of 3 golds, 3 silvers, and a bronze tied the medals haul in 1928. The achievement of 7 medals in an edition of the Olympics has yet to be matched.

== Medalists ==
Medal	Name	Sport	Event	Date
Gold	Delfo Cabrera	Athletics	Men's marathon	7 August
Gold	Pascual Pérez	Boxing	Men's flyweight	13 August
Gold	Rafael Iglesias	Boxing	Men's heavyweight	13 August
Silver	Noemí Simonetto	Athletics	Women's long jump	4 August
Silver	Carlos Enrique Díaz Sáenz Valiente	Shooting	Men's 25 m rapid fire pistol	4 August
Silver	Enrique Conrado Sieburger; Enrique Adolfo Sieburger; Emilio Homps; Rodolfo Rivademar; Rufino Rodríguez de la Torre; Julio Sieburger	Sailing	Men's 6 m class	12 August
Bronze	Mauro Cia	Boxing	Men's light heavyweight	13 August

== Athletics ==
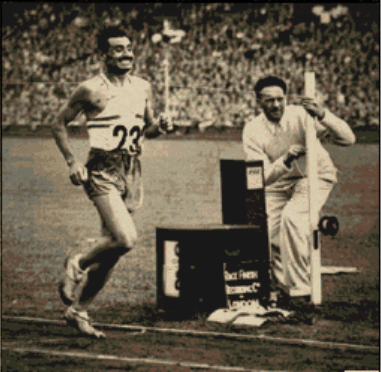
Delfo Cabrera about to win the marathon.

Key

- Note–Ranks given for track events are within the athlete's heat only
- Q = Qualified for the next round
- q = Qualified for the next round as a fastest loser or, in field events, by position without achieving the qualifying target
- NR = National record
- N/A = Round not applicable for the event
- Bye = Athlete not required to compete in round
- NP = Not placed

Men
Track & road events

Athlete	Event	Heat		Quarterfinal		Semifinal		Final	
Athlete	Event	Result	Rank	Result	Rank	Result	Rank	Result	Rank
Gerardo Bönnhoff	100 m	10.8	2 Q		5	did not advance			
Fernando Lapuente	100 m		4	did not advance					
Carlos Isaac	100 m		4	did not advance					
Gerardo Bönnhoff	200 m	22.2	1 Q		4	did not advance			
Guillermo Geary	200 m	23.0	3	did not advance					
Antonio Pocovi	400 m	50.7	3	did not advance					
Guillermo Evans	400 m	51.8	5	did not advance					
Adan Torres	800 m	1:56.7	5	—N/a		did not advance			
Guillermo Avalos	800 m	1:56.6	5	—N/a		did not advance			
Melchor Palmeiro	1500 m	4:01.6	5	—N/a				did not advance	
Ricardo Bralo	10000 m	—N/a							NP
Eusebio Guiñez	10000 m	—N/a							NP
Delfo Cabrera	Marathon	—N/a						2-34:51.6	1st place, gold medalist(s)
Eusebio Guiñez	Marathon	—N/a						2-36:36.0	5
Armando Sensini	Marathon	—N/a						2-39:30.0	9
Alberto Triulzi	110 m hurdles	14.6	1 Q	—N/a		14.6	3 Q	14.6	4
Hermelindo Alberti	400 m hurdles	54.6	3	did not advance					
Sixto Ibáñez	50 km walk	—N/a							DNF
Gerardo Bönnhoff; Alberto Biedermann; Carlos Isaac; Fernando Lapuente	4 × 100 m relay	42.4	3	—N/a				did not advance	
Antonio Pocovi; Hermelindo Alberti; Guillermo Evans; Guillermo Avalos	4 × 400 m relay	3:21.2	3	—N/a				did not advance	

Men
Field Events

Athlete	Event	Qualification		Final	
Athlete	Event	Distance	Position	Distance	Position
Enrique Kistenmacher	Long Jump	7.18	5 Q	6.80	10
Emilio Malchiodi	Shot Put		NP	did not advance	
Juan Kahnert	Shot Put		NP	did not advance	
Emilio Malchiodi	Discus Throw	42.98	18	did not advance	
Juan Fuse	Hammer Throw	46.95	20	did not advance	
Ricardo Héber	Javelin Throw	60.82	13	did not advance	

Combined events – Decathlon

Athlete	Event	100 m	LJ	SP	HJ	400 m	110H	DT	PV	JT	1500 m	Final	Rank
Enrique Kistenmacher	Result	10.9	7.08	12.67	1.70	50.5	16.3	41.11	3.20	45.06	4:49.6	6929	4
Enrique Kistenmacher	Points	872	825	684	671	845	736	744	575	499	478	6929	4

Women
Track & road events

Athlete	Event	Heat		Quarterfinal		Semifinal		Final	
Athlete	Event	Result	Rank	Result	Rank	Result	Rank	Result	Rank
Noemí Simonetto	100 m	13.1	3	—N/a		did not advance			
Noemí Simonetto	80 m Hurdles	11.8	3 Q	—N/a		11.87	4	did not advance	

Women
Field events

Athlete	Event	Qualification		Final	
Athlete	Event	Distance	Position	Distance	Position
Noemí Simonetto	long jump	5.56	3 Q	5.60	2nd place, silver medalist(s)
Ingeborg Mello	Shot put	—N/a		12.085	9
Ingeborg Mello	Discus throw	—N/a		38.44	8

== Basketball ==
This was the first time Argentina sent a team to the Olympics, the team consisted of 14 players

Team Roster

Argentina men's national basketball team roster
Players
Coaches

Pos.	No.	Name	Age – Date of birth	Height	Club	Ctr.
F/C	3	Oscar Furlong	20 – 22 October 1927
	4	Bruno Varani	22 – 16 September 1925
G	5	Ricardo González	23 – 12 May 1925
	6	Rafael Lledó	26 – 2 March 1922
	7	Arturo Ruffa	21 – 25 December 1926
	8	Manuel Guerrero	–
	9	León Martinetti	21 – 31 July 1926
	10	Rubén Menini	24 – 20 February 1924
	11	Juan Uder	21 – 24 April 1927
	12	Tomás Vio	27 – 25 July 1921
	13	Leopoldo Contarbio	21 – 29 April 1927
	14	Jorge Nuré	21 – 24 September 1926
	15	Raúl Calvo	31 – 8 May 1917
	16	Oscar Pérez	25 – 4 November 1922

Head coach

- (Argentina) Jorge Canavesi

Legend

- Club – describes last
  club before the competition
- Age – describes age
  on 30 July 1948

=== Group C ===
Team	Pld	W	L	PF	PA	PD	Pts
United States	5	5	0	325	167	+158	10
Czechoslovakia	5	4	1	217	190	+27	9
Argentina	5	3	2	236	199	+37	8
Peru	5	2	3	198	187	+11	7
Egypt	5	1	4	162	256	−94	6
Switzerland	5	0	5	120	269	−149	5

Preliminary Round (Group C)

July 31
11:40

Argentina	57–38	Egypt
Scoring by half: 26-27, 31–11
Pts: Furlong 21

Harringay Arena, London

August 02
11:40

Argentina	49–23	Switzerland
Scoring by half: 28-13, 21–10
Pts: Guerrero 11

Harringay Arena, London

August 03
11:40

Argentina	57–59	United States
Scoring by half: 33-26, 24-33
Pts: Furlong 18

Harringay Arena, London

August 05
15:20

Argentina	42–34	Peru
Scoring by half: 21-18, 21–16
Pts: Lledó 12

Harringay Arena, London

August 06
21:00

Argentina	41–45	Czechoslovakia
Scoring by half: 19-20, 22-25
Pts: Uder 12

Harringay Arena, London

- Classification Matches
  - 9th/16th place

August 07
21:00

Argentina	43–45	Philippines
Scoring by half: 23-21, 20-24
Pts: Furlong 11

Harringay Arena, London

  - 13th/16th place

August 10
15:20

Argentina	34–35	Cuba
Scoring by half: 17-14, 17-21
Pts: Furlong 17

Harringay Arena, London

  - 15th/16th place: Defeated Hungary (walk-over) → Fifteenth place

August 13

Argentina	2–0	Hungary

Harringay Arena, London

== Boxing ==
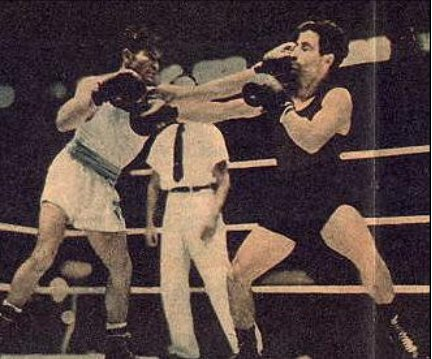
Pascual Pérez during the gold medal fight.

Athlete	Event	Round of 32	Round of 16	Quarterfinals	Semifinals	Final	
Athlete	Event	Opposition Result	Opposition Result	Opposition Result	Opposition Result	Opposition Result	Rank
Pascual Pérez	Flyweight	Adolfo (PHI); W RSC 2	Williams (RSA); W RSC 3	Bollaert (BEL); W PTS	Majdloch (TCH); W PTS	Bandinelli (ITA); W PTS	1st place, gold medalist(s)
Arnoldo Parés	Bantamweight	Toweel (RSA); W PTS	Carruthers (AUS); L PTS	did not advance			
Francisco Núñez	Featherweight	Bose (IND); W PTS	Vidella (CHI); W PTS	Kerschbaumer (AUT); W	Shepherd (RSA); L PTS	3rd/4th place Antkiewicz (POL); L PTS	
Manuel López	Lightweight	Rahimiha (IRI); W PTS	Smith (USA); L PTS	did not advance			
Eladio Herrera	Welterweight	Bye	Loayza (CHI); W PTS	Herring (USA); L PTS	did not advance		
Héctor García	Middleweight	Higham (AUS); W PTS	Wright (GBR); L RSC-2	did not advance			
Mauro Cia	Light heavyweight	Quentemeijer (NED); W PTS	Posse (URU); W DSQ-3	Szymura (POL); W PTS	Hunter (RSA); L PTS	3rd/4th place Holmes (AUS); W RSC-3	3rd place, bronze medalist(s)
Rafael Iglesias	Heavyweight	Bye	Rubio (ESP); W PTS	Baccilieri (URU); W PTS	Arthur (RSA); W PTS	Nilsson (SWE); W KO-2	1st place, gold medalist(s)

== Cycling ==
Road races

Individual times added together for team race, 3 times needed for team event.

Cyclist	Event	Final	
Cyclist	Event	Result	Rank
Ceferino Peroné	Road race	5:33:15.4	21
Dante Benvenuti	Road race	5:33:15.4	22
Miguel Sevillano	Road race	5:33:15.4	23
Mario Mathieu	Road race	did not finish	
Ceferino Peroné; Dante Benvenuti; Miguel Sevillano; Mario Mathieu	Team road race	16:39:46.2	7

Track

Ranks given are within the heat.

Cyclist	Event	First round		First repechage		Quarterfinals		Second repechage		Semifinals		Final	
Cyclist	Event	Result	Rank	Result	Rank	Result	Rank	Result	Rank	Result	Rank	Result	Rank
Clodomiro Cortoni	Sprint	12.4	1 Q	Advanced directly		Unknown	2	did not advance					
Jorge Sobrevila	Time trial	n/a										1:17.9	13
Oscar Giacché; Miguel Passi	Tandem Sprint	Unknown	2	Unknown	3	did not advance							
Roberto Guerrero; Julio Alba; Ambrosio Aimar; Enrique Molina	Team pursuit	5:17.1	2	did not advance									

== Equestrian ==
=== Dressage ===
Athlete	Horse	Event	Overall	
Athlete	Horse	Event	Score	Rank
Justo Iturralde	Pajarito	Individual	397.0	11
Humberto Terzano	Bienvenido	Individual	327.0	16
Oscar Goulú	Grillo	Individual	281.5	17
Justo Iturralde; Humberto Terzano; Oscar Goulú	See above	Team	1,005.5	4

=== Jumping ===
Athlete	Horse	Event	Overall	
Athlete	Horse	Event	Faults	Rank
Rafael Campos	Santa Fe	Individual	24.0	15
Néstor Alvarado	Mineral	Individual		DNF
Pascual Pistarini	Canguro	Individual		DNF
Rafael Campos; Néstor Alvarado; Pascual Pistarini	See above	Team		DNF

=== Eventing ===
Athlete	Horse	Event	Overall	
Athlete	Horse	Event	Score	Rank
Francisco Carrere	Rosario	Individual	59.00	10
Julio César Sagasta	Cherenda Cue	Individual	92.50	18
José Manuel Sagasta	Mandinga	Individual		DNF
Francisco Carrere; Julio César Sagasta; José Manuel Sagasta	See above	Team		DNF

== Fencing ==
19 fencers, 16 men and 3 women, represented Argentina in 1948. The results are the pool results and placings.

Men

Fencer	Events	Round 1		Quarterfinals		Semifinals		Final	
Fencer	Events	Result	Pool place	Result	Pool place	Result	Pool place	Result	Rank
Félix Galimi	Foil	5-1	2	6-1	1	1-5	7	Did not advance	
Manuel Torrente	Foil	5-2	3	1-5	6	Did not advance			
Fulvio Galimi	Foil	6-1	2	1-5	7	Did not advance			
Raúl Saucedo	Épée	3-3	3	4-3	2	1-6	7	Did not advance	
Antonio Villamil	Épée	6-1	1	3-3	4	Did not advance			
Vito Simonetti	Épée	2-4	4	1-3	6	Did not advance			
Edgardo Pomini	Sabre	5-0	1	3-4	5	Did not advance			
Fernando Huergo	Sabre	3-2	2	2-4	6	Did not advance			
Jorge Cermesoni	Sabre	4-1	1	1-6	8	Did not advance			
José Rodríguez; Fulvio Galimi; Manuel Torrente; Félix Galimi	Team Foil	n/a		1–0	1	0-1	2	did not advance	
Vito Simonetti; Antonio Villamil; Raúl Saucedo; Floro Diaz; Jorge Balza; Adolfo Guido Lavalle	Team Épée	2-0	1	0-2	3	Did not advance			
Manuel Agüero; José D'Andrea; Edgardo Pomini; Jorge Cermesoni; Fernando Huergo; Daniel Sande	Team Sabre	1-0	2	2-0	1	0-2	4	Did not advance	

Women

Fencer	Events	Round 1		Quarterfinals		Semifinals		Final	
Fencer	Events	Result	Pool place	Result	Pool place	Result	Pool place	Result	Rank
Irma de Antequeda	Foil	4-2	3	2-3	4	Did not advance			
Elsa Irigoyen	Foil	2-3	4	1-4	5	Did not advance			
Nélida Fullone	Foil	1-4	6	Did not advance					

== Field hockey ==
This was the first time Argentina had competed in this event at the Olympic Stage.

Men's tournament

Head coach:

Pos.	Player	DoB	Age	Caps	Club	Tournament games	Tournament goals
	Roberto Anderson			?		3	1
	Luis Bianchi			?		3	0
	Juan Brigo			?		3	0
	Carlos Mercali			?		3	0
	Roberto Márquez			?		3	2
	Tommie Quinn	August 19, 1927	20	?	Hurling Club	3	0
	Valerio Sánchez			?		1	0
	Luis Scally	June 26, 1915	33	?	Hurling Club	3	0
	Tommy Scally	June 28, 1927	21	?	Hurling Club	3	2
	Tomás Wade			?	Hurling Club	3	0
	Jorge Wilson			?		2	0
	Ángel Zucchi			?		3	0

=== Group A ===
Rank	Team	Pld	W	D	L	GF	GA	Pts	(India)	(Argentina)	(Austria)	(Spain)
1.	India	3	3	0	0	19	1	6	X	9:1	8:0	2:0
2.	Argentina	3	1	1	1	5	12	3	1:9	X	1:1	3:2
3.	Austria	3	0	2	1	2	10	2	0:8	1:1	X	1:1
4.	Spain	3	0	1	2	3	6	1	0:2	2:3	1:1	X

== Gymnastics ==
=== Artistic ===
Gymnast	Event	Final	
Gymnast	Event	Score	Rank
Arturo Amos	All-around	176.85	89
Arturo Amos	Horizontal bar	29.55	85
Arturo Amos	Parallel bars	31.25	83
Arturo Amos	Pommel horse	23.35	97
Arturo Amos	Rings	26.10	106
Arturo Amos	Floor exercise	32.30	76
Arturo Amos	Vault	34.30	77
Pedro Lonchibuco	All-around	154.20	102
Pedro Lonchibuco	Horizontal bar	20.50	104
Pedro Lonchibuco	Parallel bars	28.30	98
Pedro Lonchibuco	Pommel horse	18.50	105
Pedro Lonchibuco	Rings	32.20	83
Pedro Lonchibuco	Floor exercise	25.75	103
Pedro Lonchibuco	Vault	28.95	102
Enrique Rapesta	All-around	148.90	106
Enrique Rapesta	Horizontal bar	25.05	97
Enrique Rapesta	Parallel bars	25.00	104
Enrique Rapesta	Pommel horse	21.50	100
Enrique Rapesta	Rings	30.25	97
Enrique Rapesta	Floor exercise	24.50	107
Enrique Rapesta	Vault	22.60	111
César Bonoris	All-around	139.65	108
César Bonoris	Horizontal bar	22.20	101
César Bonoris	Parallel bars	28.45	96
César Bonoris	Pommel horse	14.00	113
César Bonoris	Rings	22.50	110
César Bonoris	Floor exercise	23.00	112
César Bonoris	Vault	29.50	100
Jorge Soler	All-around	134.30	113
Jorge Soler	Horizontal bar	21.40	102
Jorge Soler	Parallel bars	20.50	112
Jorge Soler	Pommel horse	17.00	107
Jorge Soler	Rings	22.80	109
Jorge Soler	Floor exercise	23.30	110
Jorge Soler	Vault	29.30	101
Roberto Núñez	All-around	109.95	115
Roberto Núñez	Horizontal bar	14.40	116
Roberto Núñez	Parallel bars	18.50	113
Roberto Núñez	Pommel horse	12.00	117
Roberto Núñez	Rings	19.00	113
Roberto Núñez	Floor exercise	21.75	113
Roberto Núñez	Vault	24.30	109
Jorge Vidal	All-around	37.30	121
Jorge Vidal	Horizontal bar	6.00	120
Jorge Vidal	Parallel bars	6.50	121
Jorge Vidal	Pommel horse	11.80	119
Jorge Vidal	Rings	8.00	121
Jorge Vidal	Vault	5.00	120
Arturo Amos; Pedro Lonchibuco; Enrique Rapesta; César Bonoris; Jorge Soler; Roberto Núñez; Jorge Vidal	Team	863.85	15

== Modern pentathlon ==
A point-for-place system was used, with the lowest total score winning.

Pentathlete	Final						
Pentathlete	Riding	Fencing	Shooting	Swimming	Running	Total	Rank
Enrique Wirth	9	17	29	25	13	93	11
Augusto Premoli	5	11	35	33	25	109	21
Horacio Siburu	13	28	30	18	38	127	32

== Rowing ==
Argentina had 26 male rowers participate in all seven rowing events in 1948.

Ranks given are within the heat.

Rower	Event	First round		Repechage		Semifinals		Final	
Rower	Event	Result	Rank	Result	Rank	Result	Rank	Result	Rank
Tranquilo Cappozzo	Single sculls	7:38.9	2 r	7:45.0	1 Q	8:12.6	2	did not advance	
Ángel Malvicino; Teodoro Nölting	Double sculls	7:08.0	2 r	7:07.1	3	did not advance			
Oscar Moreno; Carlos Sambuceti	Coxless pair	7:54.2	3 r	7:45.7	3	did not advance			
Pedro Towers; Ramón Porcel; Juan Parker	Coxed pair	walkover		N/A		8:27.7	2	did not advance	
Julio Curatella; Alberto Madero; Oscar Zolezzi; Oscar Almirón	Coxless four	6:51.0	2 r	6:50.9	2	did not advance			
Carlos Semino; Carlos Crosta; Adolfo Yedro; Ítalo Sartori; Ricardo Boneo	Coxed four	7:07.9	2 r	7:00.1	2	did not advance			
Luis Pechenino; Juan Antonio Aichino; Rubén Cabral; Christian Bove; Enrique Lingenfelder; Carlos Amado; Pascual Batista; Mario Guerci; Manuel Fernández	Eight	6:10.5	3 r	6:12.6	2	did not advance			

== Sailing ==
Athlete	Class	Race I		Race II		Race III		Race IV		Race V		Race VI		Race VII		Total Points	Total -1	Rank
Athlete	Class	Rank	Points	Rank	Points	Rank	Points	Rank	Points	Rank	Points	Rank	Points	Rank	Points	Total Points	Total -1	Rank
Jorge Emilio Brauer	Firefly	16	219	~~DNF~~	~~0~~	12	344	6	645	DNF	0	10	423	6	645	2276	2276	17
J. Piacentini; A. Carrasco; Hipolito Ezequiel Gil Elizalde	Star	14	185	10	331	10	331	7	486	13	217	~~DNF~~	~~0~~	DNS	0	1550	1550	16
J. Cibert; Silvio Merlo; M. Lawrence; Horacio Monti	Swallow	11	206	14	101	13	133	~~DNF~~	~~0~~	7	402	10	247	10	247	1336	1336	14
Roberto Sieburger; Jorge Salas Chávez; Jorge del Río Sálas	Dragon	6	402	5	481	8	277	4	578	9	226	2	879	~~DNF~~	~~0~~	2843	2843	7
Enrique Sieburger, Sr. Enrique Sieburger, Jr. Emilio Homps; Rodolfo Rivademar; Rufino Rodríguez de la Torre; Julio Sieburger	6 m class	3	665	3	665	3	665	2	841	1	1142	~~4~~	~~540~~	1	1142	5660	5120	2nd place, silver medalist(s)

== Shooting ==
Twelve shooters represented Argentina in 1948.

Shooter	Event	Final	
Shooter	Event	Score	Rank
Carlos Enrique Díaz Sáenz Valiente	25 m rapid fire pistol	571	2nd place, silver medalist(s)
José Roger	25 m rapid fire pistol	513	45
Dionisio Fernández	25 m rapid fire pistol	511	50
Federico Grüben	50 m pistol, prone	527	9
Oscar Bidegain	50 m pistol, prone	523	16
Juan Rostagno	50 m pistol, prone	507	35
Pablo Cagnasso	300 m rifle 3 positions	1075	12
Ricardo Grimau	300 m rifle 3 positions	1074	13
Abel Ortíz	300 m rifle 3 positions	1073	14
Julio Nolasco	50 m rifle, prone	585	44
Antonio Ando	50 m rifle, prone	584	48
David Schiaffino	50 m rifle, prone	583	49

== Swimming ==
This was the 5th time Argentina had sent a team of swimmers to the Olympics, the team of 17 consisted of 11 men and 6 women.

Ranks given are within the heat.

Men

Swimmer	Event	Heats		Semifinals		Final	
Swimmer	Event	Result	Rank	Result	Rank	Result	Rank
Horacio White	100 m freestyle	1:00.2	1 Q	1:00.4	5	did not advance	
Augusto Cantón	100 m freestyle	1:01.8	5	did not advance			
Mario Chávez	100 m backstroke	1:09.7	2 Q	1:09.8	5 q	1.09.0	4
José Vegazzi	100 m backstroke	1:13.8	3	did not advance			
Federico Neumayer	100 m backstroke	1:11.8	4	did not advance			
Carlos Espejo	200 m breaststroke	2:55.0	3	did not advance			
César Benetti	200 m breaststroke	3:00.6	5	did not advance			
Alfredo Yantorno	400 m freestyle	4:53.8	1 Q	4:57.3	4 q	4:58.7	8
José Durañona	400 m freestyle	5:05.8	4	did not advance			
Juan Garay	400 m freestyle	5:10.4	5	did not advance			
Juan Garay	1500 m freestyle	21:33.2	5	did not advance			
Adolfo Mancuso	1500 m freestyle	21:16.7	5	did not advance			
Horacio White; José Durañona; Juan Garay; Alfredo Yantorno; Augusto Cantón	4 × 200 m freestyle relay	9:16.9	3 Q	N/A		9:19.2	6

Women

Swimmer	Event	Heats		Semifinals		Final	
Swimmer	Event	Result	Rank	Result	Rank	Result	Rank
Eileen Holt	100 m freestyle	1:12.0	5	did not advance			
Adriana Camelli	100 m freestyle	1:16.5	6	did not advance			
Enriqueta Duarte	100 m freestyle	1:14.9	7	did not advance			
Beryl Marshall	100 m backstroke	1:20.9	4 Q	1:20.7	8	did not advance	
Liliana Gonzalias	100 m backstroke	1:26.9	6	did not advance			
Dorotea Turnbull	200 m breaststroke	3:12.2	5 Q	3:14.4	7	did not advance	
Eileen Holt	400 m freestyle	5:44.9	6 q	5:52.4	8	did not advance	
Enriqueta Duarte	400 m freestyle	6:14.4	7	did not advance			
Eileen Holt; Enriqueta Duarte; Liliana Gonzalias; Adriana Camelli	4 × 100 m freestyle relay	4:59.5	5	did not advance			

== Water polo ==
Men's Team Competition

Head coach:

No.	Pos.	Player	DoB	Age	Caps	Club	Tournament games	Tournament goals
		Rubén Maidana	January 12, 1923	25	?	(Argentina) Regattas Santa Fe	3	?
		Ladislao Szabo	April 11, 1923	25	?		3	?
		Hugo Prono	February 23, 1923	25	?		3	?
		Osvaldo Codaro	December 9, 1930	30	?		3	?
		Carlos Visentin	November 28, 1918	29	?		3	?
		Marcelo Visentin	May 30, 1914	34	?		3	?
		Anibál Filiberti	March 31, 1914	34	?		3	?

=== Round 1 ===
Group F

Rank	Team	Pld	W	D	L	GF	GA	Pts	(France)	(Argentina)	(Greece)
1.	France	2	2	0	0	11	2	4	X	4:1	7:1
2.	Argentina	2	1	0	1	7	6	2	1:4	X	6:2
3.	Greece	2	0	0	2	3	13	0	1:7	2:6	X

=== Round 2 ===
Group J

Rank	Team	Pld	W	D	L	GF	GA	Pts	(France)	(Egypt)	(Argentina)
1.	France	2	1	1	0	7	4	3	X	3:3	4:1
2.	Egypt	2	0	2	0	7	7	2	3:3	X	4:4
3.	Argentina	2	0	1	1	5	8	1	1:4	4:4	X

== Weightlifting ==
Lifter	Event	Final	
Lifter	Event	Kg	Rank
Alfonso Fiorentino	Featherweight	260	21
Salvador Lo Presti	Lightweight	300	18
Hugo D'Atri	Lightweight	295	20
Julio Bonnet	Middleweight	312.5	18
Juan Russo	Middleweight	310	20
Osvaldo Forte	Light Heavyweight	367.5	5
Hugo Vallarino	Heavyweight	357.5	11
Leopoldo Briola	Heavyweight	347.5	13

== Wrestling ==
Men's Greco-Roman

Athlete	Event	Round 1	Round 2	Round 3	Round 4	Round 5	Final / BM	
Athlete	Event	Opposition Result	Opposition Result	Opposition Result	Opposition Result	Opposition Result	Opposition Result	Rank
Manuel Varela	−52 kg	Szilagyi (HUN); L Fall	Sidani (LIB); W Fall	Clausen (NOR); L 0-3	did not advance			7
Elvidio Flamini	−57 kg	BYE	Elias (AUT); L 0-3	Irvine (GBR); W Fall	Hassan (EGY); L Fall	did not advance		5
Omar Blebel	−62 kg	Dijk (NED); L 0-3	Gryllos (GRE); L 1-2	did not advance				13
Luis Rosado	−67 kg	Damage (LIB); L Fall	Petmezas (GRE); L Fall	did not advance				13
Alberto Longarella	−73 kg	Diggelmann (SUI); W 2-1	Chesneau (FRA); L 0-3	Männikkö (FIN); L Fall	did not advance			10
Alberto Bolzi	−79 kg	Gallegati (ITA); L Fall	Tayfur (TUR); L Fall	did not advance				10
Adolfo Ramirez	−87 kg	Avcioğlu-Çakmak (TUR); L 0-3	Kovács (HUN); L 0-3	did not advance				11
Ernesto Noya	+87 kg	Kangasniemi (FIN); L Fall	Tarányi (HUN); L Fall	did not advance				7
