= Deaths in May 2005 =

The following is a list of notable deaths in May 2005.

Entries for each day are listed alphabetically by surname. A typical entry lists information in the following sequence:

- Name, age, country of citizenship at birth, subsequent country of citizenship (if applicable), reason for notability, cause of death (if known), and reference.

== May 2005 ==
=== 1 ===
- Albert Rex Bergstrom, 79, New Zealand econometrician.
- Motibhai Chaudhary, 81, Indian politician.
- Neville Gruzman, 80, Australian architect, writer and architectural activist.
- Rene Rivkin, 60, Australian stockbroker, suicide.
- Harry Warburton, 84, Swiss bobsledder and Olympian (1956).

=== 2 ===
- Emmett Barrett, 88, American football player (New York Giants).
- Renée Faure, 86, French actress.
- Robert Hunter, 63, Canadian environmentalist, journalist, and co-founder of Greenpeace, prostate cancer.
- Theo Middelkamp, 91, Dutch cyclist and first Dutch world champion.
- Jack Nichols, 67, American gay rights activist, cancer.
- Börje Nyberg, 85, Swedish actor and film director.
- Raisa Struchkova, 79, Russian dancer and People's Artist of the USSR.
- David Tyrrell, 79, British virologist.
- Wee Kim Wee, 89, Singaporean politician, fourth President of Singapore from 1985 to 1993, prostate cancer.

=== 3 ===
- Jagjit Singh Aurora, 89, Indian army general.
- Don Canham, 87, American track and field athlete, University of Michigan athletic director, accidental death.
- Bobby Forrest, 73, English footballer.
- Harry H. MacLaughlin, 77, American district judge (United States District Court for the District of Minnesota).
- Michel Maurice-Bokanowski, 92, French politician.
- Pierre Moerlen, 52, French drummer and percussionist.
- Willi Steffen, 80, Swiss football player.
- John Woudenberg, 86, American football player (Pittsburgh Steelers, San Francisco 49ers).

=== 4 ===
- Mark Boyle, 70, Scottish artist.
- Vince Cazzetta, 79, American basketball coach (Seattle Chieftains, Pittsburgh Pipers).
- Else Christensen, 92, Danish heathenism figure and white separatist.
- David Hackworth, 74, American Vietnam War veteran and journalist, bladder cancer.
- Sydney Harrington, 78, British weightlifter and Olympian (1956).
- Michael Kernan, 78, American author and journalist.
- Joyce Lambert, 88, British botanist and ecologist, bronchopneumonia.
- David McKee, 86, Australian politician.
- Magdolna Nyári-Kovács, 83, Hungarian fencer and Olympic silver medalist (1952, 1956, 1960).
- Luis Taruc, 91, Filipino communist revolutionary figure and resistance leader during World War II.

=== 5 ===
- Ted Atkinson, 88, Canadian-American Hall of Fame jockey, stroke.
- Elisabeth Fraser, 85, American actress (The Phil Silvers Show, A Patch of Blue, One Happy Family).
- Herman Gundlach, 91, American football player (Boston Redskins).
- June MacCloy, 96, American actress.
- Skip Minisi, 78, American football player (New York Giants).
- Édgar Ponce, 30, Mexican actor, traffic collision during the filming of video for "Sólo para mujeres".

=== 6 ===
- Luis Caballero, 42, Paraguayan footballer, homicide.
- Rafael Díaz-Balart, 79, Cuban politician, opponent and former brother-in-law of Fidel Castro, leukemia.
- Pete Gebrian, 81, American baseball player (Chicago White Sox).
- Joe Grant, 96, American animator and screenwriter (Fantasia, Alice in Wonderland, Pocahontas), heart attack.
- Luis Iriondo, 52, Bolivian footballer.
- Ernestine Lebrun, 99, French Olympic freestyle swimmer (1920, 1924).
- Herb Sargent, 81, American television comedy writer, heart attack.
- Lee Stine, 91, American MLB baseball player (Chicago White Sox, Cincinnati Reds, New York Yankees), stroke.
- Pearce Wright, 72, British journalist and editor.

=== 7 ===
- Václav Boštík, 91, Czech artist.
- Bruce Duncan, 76, Australian politician.
- Tristan Egolf, 33, American author, suicide by gunshot.
- Ray Hamann, 93, American basketball player.
- Milan Poredski, 83, Croatian Olympic cyclist (1948).
- Peter W. Rodino, 95, American politician and chairman of the House Judiciary Committee during the impeachment process against Richard Nixon, heart attack.
- Otilino Tenorio, 25, Ecuadorian football player, traffic collision.

=== 8 ===
- Wolfgang Blochwitz, 64, German footballer.
- Jean Carrière, 76, French writer.
- Rafiqul Bari Chowdhury, Bangladeshi cinematographer and director.
- Lloyd Cutler, 87, American attorney, former White House Counsel under Presidents Carter and Clinton.
- Ross Henrick, 50, Australian rugby league footballer.
- Bill O'Brien, 80, American football player (Detroit Lions).
- Nasrat Parsa, 37, Afghan singer, beaten.
- Walter Jay Skinner, 77, American district judge (United States District Court for the District of Massachusetts).
- Nino Terzo, 81, Italian actor.
- Francisco Viladomat, 78, Spanish Olympic alpine skier (1952, 1956).
- Nicolás Vuyovich, 23, Argentine racing driver, plane crash.
- Gianpietro Zappa, 49, Swiss football player.

=== 9 ===
- Jacques Dohen, 75, French Olympic hurdler (1952).
- Ang Kiukok, 74, Filipino painter.
- Chris Kreski, 42, American writer, biographer and screenwriter, cancer.
- Charles Morrison, 72, British landowner and Conservative politician.
- Darko Nišavić, 52, Serbian wrestler and Olympian (1976, 1980).
- Akihiko Saito, 44, Japanese hostage in Iraq, murdered.
- Tiny Wharton, 77, British football referee.
- David Wayne, 47, American singer of the heavy metal group Metal Church, road incident death.

=== 10 ===
- Romy Diaz, 63, Filipino actor.
- Henry France, 57-58, Ghanaian Olympic footballer (1972).
- Hal Griggs, 76, American baseball player (Washington Senators).
- Vic Johnson, 84, American baseball player (Boston Red Sox, Cleveland Indians).
- Jim Love, 78, American sculptor.
- Jay Marshall, 85, American magician and ventriloquist, dean of the Society of American Magicians, heart attack.
- Beni Obermüller, 75, German Olympic alpine skier (1952, 1956).
- Govind Narayan Singh, 84, Indian politician.

=== 11 ===
- Léo Cadieux, 96, Canadian politician and diplomat.
- Michalis Genitsaris, 86, Greek rebetiko singer and composer.
- Axel Östrand, 95, Swedish Olympic ski jumper (1936).
- Bob Stuart, 84, New Zealand rugby player.
- Percy Trezise, 82, Australian painter, writer and explorer.

=== 12 ===
- Noël Deschamps, 96, Australian public servant and diplomat.
- Evaristo Iglesias, 79, Cuban Olympic sprinter (1956).
- Ömer Kavur, 60, Turkish film director, producer, and screenwriter, lymphoma.
- Frankie LaRocka, 51, American rock musician and producer, complications following heart surgery.
- Martin Lings, 96, English writer, scholar, philosopher and arabist.
- Gunnar Nilsson, 82, Swedish heavyweight boxer and Olympic silver medalist (1948).
- Sara Qadimova, 82, Azerbaijani khananda singer.
- Kai Setälä, 91, Finnish physician.
- Ladislau Șimon, 53, Romanian super-heavyweight freestyle wrestler and Olympic medalist (1976), stroke.
- Owen Wilkes, 65, New Zealand entomologist, conservationist and peace campaigner, suicide.
- Monica Zetterlund, 67, Swedish singer and actress, conflagration.

=== 13 ===
- Eddie Barclay, 84, French record producer and founder of Barclay Records.
- Basil Christensen, 66, British field hockey player and Olympian (1968).
- George Dantzig, 90, American mathematician, "father of linear programming", diabetes.
- Andrey Favorsky, 76, Soviet Kyrgyz Olympic equestrian (1956, 1960, 1964).
- Tony Martin, 57, American Olympic rower (1968).
- Hugh Montefiore, 85, English Bishop of Birmingham and environmental activist with Friends of the Earth.
- Raymond Redheffer, 84, American mathematician.
- Michael Bruce Ross, 45, American convicted serial killer, execution by lethal injection.
- Utpala Sen, 81, Indian Bengali playback singer.
- Victor Sproles, 77, American jazz bassist.
- Adriano Zamboni, 71, Italian racing cyclist.
- Miroslav Šutej, 69, Croatian avant-garde painter and graphic artist.

=== 14 ===
- Michael Carson, 57, Australian television director, pancreatic cancer.
- Józef Gąsienica, 64, Polish Olympic Nordic combined skier (1968, 1972).
- Jimmy Martin, 77, American bluegrass singer, bladder cancer.
- Helvécio Martins, 74, Brazilian LDS leader.
- Ken McBride, 76, American basketball player (Milwaukee Hawks).
- Mary Treadgold, 95, English author, literary editor and BBC producer, cancer.

=== 15 ===
- Vakha Arsanov, Chechen warlord and vice president of the Chechen Republic of Ichkeria, killed.
- Les Bartley, 51, Canadian coach of the Toronto Rock of the National Lacrosse League, colon cancer.
- Alan B. Gold, 88, Canadian Chief Justice of the Quebec Superior Court.
- Natalya Gundareva, 56, Russian actress, stroke.
- Aulis Kallakorpi, 76, Finnish ski jumper and Olympic silver medalist (1956).
- Theola Kilgore, 79, American soul and gospel singer.
- Mahipal, 86, Indian film actor, cardiac arrest.
- Amadeus Webersinke, 84, German pianist and organist.

=== 16 ===
- L. Bruce Archer, 82, British mechanical engineer and designer.
- Rees Davies, 66, Welsh historian.
- Andrew Goodpaster, 90, American army general and former leader of NATO, prostate cancer.
- June Lang, 90, American actor.
- José M. López, 94, Mexican US Army soldier during World War II and Medal of Honor recipient.
- Arthur Naftalin, 87, American politician, former mayor of Minneapolis, Minnesota, suicide from height.
- Daiki Susumu, 31, Hawaiian sumo wrestler.

=== 17 ===
- Keiiti Aki, 75, Japanese seismologist.
- Cláudio Brito, 40, Brazilian Olympic handball player (1992).
- Helga Diederichsen, 74, Mexican Olympic swimmer (1948).
- Piero Dorazio, 77, Italian painter.
- Pop Goodwin, 84, American basketball player (Providence Steamrollers).
- Frank Gorshin, 71, American actor (Batman, 12 Monkeys, That Darn Cat!), cancer.
- Vladimir Stogov, 74, Russian weightlifter, world champion, and Olympic medalist (1956).
- Ismail Yusupov, 91, Soviet Uyghur First Secretary of the Kazakh SSR.

=== 18 ===
- Alf Arrowsmith, 62, English football player.
- João Manuel, 37, Portuguese footballer.
- Gergely Pongrátz, 73, Hungarian anti-communist.
- Shaima Rezayee, 24, Afghan TV presenter, shot.
- Bobby Thompson, 67, American banjoist (Area Code 615).
- Whayne Wilson, 29, Costa Rican footballer and Olympian (2004), traffic collision.
- Denis Wright, 94, British diplomat, prostate cancer.
- Bob Wynn, 65, American golfer.
- Stella Zázvorková, 83, Czech actress, heart attack.

=== 19 ===
- John Arthur, 75, South African Olympic boxer (1948).
- Henry Corden, 85, Canadian voice actor (The Flintstones, The Ten Commandments, Jonny Quest), emphysema.
- Batya Gur, 57, Israeli author, lung cancer.
- Richard Lewine, 94, American Broadway composer and TV producer.
- Paul Schneider-Esleben, 89, German architect.
- Milton A. Wolf, 80, American diplomat, investment banker and real estate developer, lymphoma.
- Victor Wouk, 86, American scientist and electrical engineer, cancer.

=== 20 ===
- Toon Brusselers, 71, Belgian-born Dutch footballer.
- J. D. Cannon, 83, American actor (McCloud, Cool Hand Luke, Raise the Titanic).
- Marian Foik, 71, Polish sprinter and Olympian (1956, 1960, 1964).
- Joseph Levis, 99, American foil fencer and Olympic medalist (1928, 1932, 1936).
- Paul Ricœur, 92, French philosopher and teacher.
- Lujo Tončić-Sorinj, 90, Austrian diplomat and politician, former Foreign Minister of Austria.
- Richard Q. Twiss, 84, British astronomer.
- Harriet White Medin, 91, American actress (Death Race 2000, The Horrible Dr. Hichcock, The Terminator).

=== 21 ===
- Stephen Elliott, 86, American actor (Arthur, Beverly Hills Cop, Dallas), heart attack.
- Bedford Jezzard, 77, English footballer, former Fulham F.C. football player and manager.
- David Lang, 37, American NFL football player (Los Angeles Rams, Dallas Cowboys), shot.
- Howard Morris, 85, American voice actor (The Flintstones, Garfield and Friends, Police Academy).
- Subodh Mukherjee, 84, Indian filmmaker, leukemia.
- Bob Paffrath, 86, American football player (Minnesota Golden Gophers, Brooklyn Dodgers, Miami Seahawks).

=== 22 ===
- Enio Conti, 92, American football player (Philadelphia Eagles, Steagles).
- Charilaos Florakis, 91, Greek politician, secretary general of the Communist Party of Greece (1972–1989), heart attack.
- Bertha Harris, 67, American lesbian novelist.
- Vitaly Mukha, 69, Ukrainian-Russian politician.
- Thurl Ravenscroft, 91, American voice actor (Tony the Tiger, How the Grinch Stole Christmas!), prostate cancer.

=== 23 ===
- John Albano, 82, American comic book writer (Jonah Hex).
- Sígfrid Gràcia, 73, Spanish footballer.
- Ernst Jakob Henne, 101, German motorcycle racer and racecar driver.
- Tetsuya Ishida, 31, Japanese painter, railway accident.
- Derek Ratcliffe, 75, British conservationist.
- Roderick Wright, 64, Scottish Roman Catholic bishop, renounced the office of bishop.

=== 24 ===
- Carl Amery, 83, German writer.
- Roger Dwyre, 91, French film editor.
- Arthur Haulot, 91, Belgian journalist, member of the resistance during World War II, thrombosis.
- Michalis Kousis, 51, Greek Olympic long-distance runner (1976, 1980, 1984), heart problems.
- Vivian Liberto, 71, American homemaker and author.
- Robert McAuliffe, 66, US Virgin Islander Olympic sports shooter (1972).
- Marian Oleś, 70, Polish prelate of the Catholic Church.
- Saeed Khan Rangeela, 68, Pakistani actor, singer and director, kidney failure.

=== 25 ===
- Ricardo Adolfo, 87-88, Filipino Olympic boxer (1948).
- Sunil Dutt, 75, Indian Bollywood actor and Union Minister, India, heart attack.
- Robert Jankel, 67, British limousine designer, pancreatic cancer.
- Graham Kennedy, 71, Australian TV celebrity and comedian, pneumonia.
- Vera Komarkova, 62, Czech-American mountaineer and botanist, complications of breast cancer treatment.
- Ruth Laredo, 67, American pianist.
- Ismail Merchant, 68, Indian-British film producer, ulcer.
- Jurij Moskvitin, 67, Danish classical pianist, philosopher, and mathematician.
- Zoran Mušič, 96, Slovene painter, graphic artist and draughtsman.
- Svend Nielsen, 76, Danish footballer and Olympian (1952).
- Ben Peters, 71, American country music songwriter.
- Army Tomaini, 87, American football player (New York Giants).
- Domenic Troiano, 59, Canadian guitarist, cancer.
- Harold R. Tyler Jr., 83, American district judge (United States District Court for the Southern District of New York).

=== 26 ===
- Eddie Albert, 99, American actor (Roman Holiday, Green Acres, The Heartbreak Kid), pneumonia and Alzheimer's disease.
- George Thomas Van Bebber, 73, American district judge (United States District Court for the District of Kansas).
- Charles Bouvet, 86, French Olympic pole vaulter (1948).
- Chico Carrasquel, 77, Venezuelan MLB baseball player, heart attack.
- Israel Epstein, 90, Polish-Chinese communist journalist and author.
- Joe Lee Johnson, 75, American NASCAR racing driver, cancer.
- Sangoulé Lamizana, 89, Burkinabe politician, president of Burkina Faso.
- Krzysztof Nowak, 29, Polish football player for VfL Wolfsburg and the Poland national team, ALS.
- Radius Prawiro, 76, Indonesian economist and politician, Minister of Finance (1983-1988).
- Jim Ray, 60, American baseball player (Houston Astros, Detroit Tigers).
- Kent Townley, 75, American Olympic wrestler (1956).
- Dale Velzy, 77, American surfboard shaper.

=== 27 ===
- Abuzar Aydamirov, 71, Chechen writer.
- Morris Cohen, 93, American metallurgist.
- Franco Diogene, 57, Italian actor and comedian, heart attack.
- Fay Godwin, 74, British photographer.
- Piotr Gładki, 33, Polish Olympic long-distance runner (2000), traffic collision.
- Max Lundgren, 68, Swedish author of children's books.

=== 28 ===
- Clair Armstrong Callan, 85, American politician, U.S. Representative from Nebraska (1965–1967).
- Rosette Batarda Fernandes, 89, Portuguese botanist, taxonomist, and curator.
- John Sidney Garrett, 83, American politician, member of the Louisiana House of Representatives.
- Arnie Morton, 83, American restaurateur, founder of Morton's of Chicago steakhouses, Alzheimer's disease.
- Jean Négroni, 84, French actor and theatre director.
- Daniel Quirk, 22, American professional wrestler.
- Avner Shaki, 79, Israeli politician.

=== 29 ===
- Oscar Brown, Jr., 78, American musician, playwright, and activist.
- Patsy Calton, 56, British politician and Member of Parliament, cancer.
- John D'Amico, 67, Canadian NHL linesman and later supervisor of officials, leukemia.
- María de los Ángeles Alvariño González, 88, Spanish oceanographer.
- Joseph Karth, 82, American politician, U.S. Representative from Minnesota (1959–1977).
- Hamilton Naki, 78, South African surgeon.
- Svatopluk Pluskal, 74, Czechoslovak footballer, stroke.
- George Rochberg, 86, American composer.
- Luciano Rossi, 70, Italian film actor.
- Gordon Tait, 83, British Royal Navy officer.
- Kazimierz Urbanik, 75, Polish mathematician.
- Gé van Dijk, 81, Dutch football player and coach.

=== 30 ===
- Alfredo Bercht, 83, Brazilian Olympic sailor (1952, 1956).
- Takanohana Kenshi, (née Mitsuru Hanada), 55, Japanese sumo wrestler, aka "The Prince of Sumo", cancer.
- Jan Knappert, 78, Dutch linguist.
- Fazal Mahmood, 78, Pakistani cricket captain, heart attack.
- Hans Martin, 92, Swiss racing cyclist.
- Arnold Pomerans, 85, German-British translator.
- Herbert Warren Wind, 88, American sportswriter.
- Alma Ziegler, 87, American baseball player.

=== 31 ===
- Emily Blatch, Baroness Blatch, 67, British politician and life peer, pancreatic cancer.
- Archil Gomiashvili, 79, Soviet Georgian actor, lung cancer.
- Jaime Mendoza-Nava, 79, Bolivian-American composer and conductor.
- Windland Smith Rice, 35, American nature and animal photographer, long QT syndrome.
- Grisélidis Réal, 75, Swiss writer and sex worker, cancer.
- Eduardo Teixeira Coelho, 86, Portuguese comic book artist.
- Irma Walther, 84, German Olympic gymnast (1952).
