= Equestrian at the 1948 Summer Olympics – Individual dressage =

Equestrian at the Olympics

Individual dressage at the Games of the XIV Olympiad
- Venue: Aldershot
- Date: 9–10 August 1948
- Competitors: 19 from 9 nations

Medalists
1st place, gold medalist(s)		Hans Moser	Switzerland
2nd place, silver medalist(s)		André Jousseaume	France
3rd place, bronze medalist(s)		Gustaf Adolf Boltenstern, Jr.	Sweden

The individual dressage in equestrian at the 1948 Olympic Games in London was held in Aldershot from 9 to 10 August. Swiss rider Hans Moser won the gold medal. The silver was won by André Jousseaume of France and the bronze by Swedish rider Gustaf Adolf Boltenstern, Jr. The sixth place finisher, Gehnäll Persson, was disqualified when it was discovered that he was only a noncommissioned officer and thus ineligible to compete.

== Competition format ==
The team and individual dressage competitions used the same results. A test was to be carried out from memory by each rider within 13 minutes, losing half a point for every second over the time limit.

== Results ==
Rank	Rider	Nation	Horse	Score
1st place, gold medalist(s)	Hans Moser	Switzerland	Hummer	492.5
2nd place, silver medalist(s)	André Jousseaume	France	Harpagon	480.0
3rd place, bronze medalist(s)	Gustaf Adolf Boltenstern, Jr.	Sweden	Trumf	477.5
4	Robert Borg	United States	Klingsor	473.5
5	Henri Saint Cyr	Sweden	Djinn	444.5
6	Jean Saint-Fort Paillard	France	Sous les Ceps	439.5
7	Alois Podhajsky	Austria	Teja	437.5
8	Earl Foster Thomson	United States	Pancraft	421.0
9	Fernando Paes	Portugal	Matamas	411.0
10	Francisco Valadas	Portugal	Feitico	405.0
11	Justo Iturralde	Argentina	Pajarito	397.0
12	Luís Mena e Silva	Portugal	Fascinante	366.0
13	Frank Henry	United States	Reno Overdo	361.5
14	Carlos Kirkpatrick	Spain	Yanta	353.0
15	Maurice Buret	France	Saint Ouen	349.5
16	Humberto Terzano	Argentina	Bienvenido	327.0
17	Oscar Goulú	Argentina	Grillo	281.5
18	Gabriel Gracida	Mexico	Kamcia	248.5
-	Gehnäll Persson	Sweden	Knaust	DSQ
