= Taljaard =

Taljaard is a South African surname. Notable people with the surname include:

- Etienne Taljaard
- Hannes Taljaard
- Jacob Taljaard
- Piet Taljaard
- Raenette Taljaard (born 1972), South African academic and former politician
- Trudie Taljaard

== See also ==
- Taljard
