= Weightlifting at the 1948 Summer Olympics – Men's +82.5 kg =

Men's +82.5 kg at the Games of the XIV Olympiad
- Venue: Empress Hall (Earls Court Exhibition Centre)
- Date: 11 August 1948
- Competitors: 16 from 14 nations
- Winning total: 452.5 kg OR

Medalists
1st place, gold medalist(s)		John Davis	United States
2nd place, silver medalist(s)		Norbert Schemansky	United States
3rd place, bronze medalist(s)		Abraham Charite	Netherlands

The men's +82.5 kg weightlifting competitions at the 1948 Summer Olympics in London took place on 11 August at the Empress Hall of the Earls Court Exhibition Centre. It was the sixth time the heavyweight class competition was held, all at over 82.5 kg.

Each weightlifter had three attempts at each of the three lifts. The best score for each lift was summed to give a total. The weightlifter could increase the weight between attempts (minimum of 5 kg between first and second attempts, 2.5 kg between second and third attempts) but could not decrease weight. If two or more weightlifters finished with the same total, the competitors' body weights were used as the tie-breaker (lighter athlete wins).

== Records ==
Prior to this competition, the existing world and Olympic records were as follows.

World record	Press	John Davis (USA)	151 kg		1948
World record	Snatch	John Davis (USA)	139.5 kg		1947
World record	Clean & Jerk	John Davis (USA)	174.5 kg		1947
World record	Total	John Davis (USA)	455 kg	Philadelphia, United States	26–27 September 1946
Olympic record	Press	Josef Manger (GER)	132.5 kg	Berlin, Germany	5 August 1936
Olympic record	Snatch	Ronald Walker (GBR)	127.5 kg	Berlin, Germany	5 August 1936
Olympic record	Clean & Jerk	Arnold Luhaäär (EST)	165 kg	Berlin, Germany	5 August 1936
Olympic record	Total	Josef Manger (GER)	410 kg	Berlin, Germany	5 August 1936

== Results ==
Rank	Athlete	Nation	Body weight	Press (kg)				Snatch (kg)				Clean & Jerk (kg)				Total
Rank	Athlete	Nation	Body weight	1	2	3	Result	1	2	3	Result	1	2	3	Result	Total
1st place, gold medalist(s)	John Davis	United States	98.64	137.5	~~147.5~~	—	137.5 OR	127.5	137.5	~~142.5~~	137.5 OR	165	~~177.5~~	177.5	177.5 WR	452.5 OR
2nd place, silver medalist(s)	Norbert Schemansky	United States	92.61	117.5	122.5	~~125~~	122.5	127.5	132.5	~~137.5~~	132.5	160	170	~~177.5~~	170	425
3rd place, bronze medalist(s)	Abraham Charité	Netherlands	102.50	120	125	127.5	127.5	117.5	122.5	125	125	150	155	160	160	412.5
4	Alfred Knight	Great Britain	99.20	112.5	117.5	~~122.5~~	117.5	112.5	117.5	~~120~~	117.5	~~145~~	145	155	155	390
5	Hanafi Moustafa	Egypt	102.60	112.5	117.5	120	120	110	~~115~~	115	115	145	150	~~155~~	150	385
6	Niels Petersen	Denmark	98.28	107.5	115	~~117.5~~	115	105	~~112.5~~	112.5	112.5	150	~~155~~	155	155	382.5
7	Robert Allart	Belgium	101.04	115	120	122.5	122.5	105	110	~~112.5~~	110	140	145	~~147.5~~	145	377.5
8	Piet Taljaard	South Africa	105.25	112.5	117.5	~~122.5~~	117.5	107.5	~~112.5~~	112.5	112.5	~~140~~	140	145	145	375
9	Alfonso Parera	Cuba	96.87	105	~~110~~	~~110~~	105	105	110	112.5	112.5	140	150	155	155	372.5
10	Carlos Domínguez	Peru	97.00	112.5	~~117.5~~	117.5	117.5	105	~~110~~	~~110~~	105	135	140	~~142.5~~	140	362.5
11	Hugo Vallarino	Argentina	101.08	100	~~105~~	~~105~~	100	107.5	~~112.5~~	112.5	112.5	145	~~152.5~~	~~152.5~~	145	357.5
12	Ray Magee	Australia	115.70	110	~~115~~	~~115~~	110	105	110	~~112.5~~	110	130	137.5	~~145~~	137.5	357.5
13	Leopoldo Briola	Argentina	95.34	110	~~115~~	~~115~~	110	97.5	102.5	~~107.5~~	102.5	130	135	~~140~~	135	347.5
14	Franz Eibler	Austria	84.35	95	102.5	~~105~~	102.5	100	~~107.5~~	~~107.5~~	100	125	~~130~~	~~130~~	125	327.5
15	Muhammad Naqi Butt	Pakistan	86.15	90	95	97.5	97.5	90	95	97.5	97.5	120	125	~~127.5~~	125	320
16	Dandamudi Rajagopal	India	91.70	87.5	92.5	~~95~~	92.5	85	90	~~92.5~~	90	112.5	117.5	122.5	122.5	305

== New records ==
Press	137.5 kg	John Davis (USA)	OR
Snatch	137.5 kg	John Davis (USA)	OR
Clean & Jerk	177.5 kg	John Davis (USA)	WR, OR
Total	452.5 kg	John Davis (USA)	OR
