= Premoli =

Premoli is a surname that may refer to:

- Augusto Premoli (1925–2018), Argentine Olympic modern pentathlete
- Flavio Premoli (born 1949), Italian musician and composer
- Giovanni Premoli, alias of Janko Premrl (1920–1943), Slovene partisan
- Luzia Premoli (born 1955), Brazilian Catholic nun and missionary

== See also ==
- Premolis, a genus of moths
