= Alfred Knight =

Alfred Knight may refer to:

- Alfred Joseph Knight (1888–1960), English recipient of the Victoria Cross
- Alfred Knight (weightlifter) (born 1916), British weightlifter
