= John Arthur (boxer) =

South African boxer (1929–2005)

Personal information
- Born: 29 August 1929
- Died: 19 May 2005 (aged 75)
Medal record
Men's Boxing
Representing South Africa
Olympic Games
Bronze medal – third place	1948 London	Heavyweight

John Duncan Arthur (29 August 1929 – 19 May 2005) was a South African boxer who competed in the 1948 Summer Olympics. He was born in Springs, South Africa.

== Amateur career ==
Won the Heavyweight bronze medal for South Africa at the 1948 Summer Olympics in London. Below are John Arthur's results from that tournament:

First round (round of 32): bye;

Round of 16: defeated James Galli of France; referee stopped contest in first round;

Quarterfinal: defeated Jay Lambert of the United States on points;

Semifinal: lost to Rafael Iglesias of Argentina on points;

Bronze medal match: defeated Hans Müller of Switzerland by walkover
