= José Rubio =

José Rubio may refer to:

- José Luis Rubio, Mexican beach volleyball player
- José María Rubio, Spanish Jesuit
- José Arturo Rubio, Spanish boxer
- José Rubio (footballer)
- José Rubio (racewalker)
