= Rafael Campos =

Rafael Campos may refer to:

- Rafael Campos (actor)
- Rafael Campos (golfer)
- Rafael Campos (equestrian)
