= Manuel Guerrero =

Manuel Guerrero may refer to:

- Manuel Flores Leon Guerrero, Governor of the U.S. territory of Guam from 1963 to 1969
- Manuel Amador Guerrero, first president of Panama (1904 to 1908)
- Manuel Guerrero (basketball), Argentine basketball player
- Manuel Guerrero (footballer), Chilean footballer
- Manuel S. Guerrero, Filipino doctor
