= Vicente dos Santos =

Brazilian boxer

Personal information
- Full name: Vicente Antônio dos Santos
- Born: 10 June 1929 São Paulo, Brazil

Sport
- Sport: Boxing

Vicente dos Santos (born 10 June 1929) is a Brazilian boxer. He competed in the men's heavyweight event at the 1948 Summer Olympics. At the 1948 Summer Olympics, he lost to Jay Lambert of the United States.
