= Terzano =

Terzano is an Italian surname. Notable people with the surname include:

- Humberto Terzano (1911–?), Argentine equestrian
- Massimo Terzano (1892–1947), Italian cinematographer
- Ubaldo Terzano, Italian cinematographer and camera operator
