= Gunnar Nilsson (disambiguation) =

Gunnar Nilsson (1948–1978) was a Swedish racing driver.

Gunnar Nilsson may also refer to:

- Gunnar Nilsson (athlete) (1889–1948), Swedish Olympic athlete
- Gunnar Nilsson (boxer) (1923–2005), Swedish boxer who competed in the 1948 Summer Olympics
- Gunnar Nilsson (motorcyclist), Swedish off-road motorcyclist who won the Baja 1000
- Gunnar Nilsson (trade unionist) (1922–1997), Swedish trade union organizer

== See also ==
- Gunnar Nielsen (disambiguation)
- Gunnar Nelson (disambiguation)
