= Adam Faul =

Canadian boxer (1929–2016)

Personal information
- Born: 18 April 1929 Regina, Saskatchewan, Canada
- Died: 19 March 2016 (aged 86)

Sport
- Sport: Boxing

Adam Faul (18 April 1929 – 19 March 2016) was a Canadian boxer. He competed in the men's heavyweight event at the 1948 Summer Olympics. He was inducted into the Saskatchewan Sports Hall of Fame in 1976.

== 1948 Olympic results ==
Below is the record of Adam Faul in the heavyweight event at the 1948 London Olympics:

- Round of 32: bye
- Round of 16: defeated Victor Bignon (Chile) on points
- Quarterfinal: lost to Gunnar Nilsson (Sweden) on points
