= Finn Pedersen =

Danish rower (1925–2012)

Personal information
- Born: 30 July 1925 Roskilde, Denmark
- Died: 14 January 2012 (aged 86) Roskilde, Denmark

Sport
- Sport: Rowing
Medal record
Men's rowing
Representing Denmark
Olympic Games
Gold medal – first place	1948 London	Coxed pair
European Rowing Championships
Bronze medal – third place	1947 Lucerne	Coxed pair
Bronze medal – third place	1953 Copenhagen	Coxless pair
Gold medal – first place	1954 Amsterdam	Coxless pair

Finn Pedersen (30 July 1925 – 14 January 2012) was a Danish rower who competed in the 1948 Summer Olympics and in the 1956 Summer Olympics.

He was born in Roskilde. In 1948 he was a crew member of the Danish boat which won the gold medal in the coxed pairs event. Eight years later he and his partner Kjeld Østrøm were eliminated in the semi-finals of the coxless pair competition.
