= Vincent Deeney =

American rower

Personal information
- Born: January 23, 1915 Philadelphia, Pennsylvania, United States
- Died: June 25, 1999 (aged 84) Sharon Hill, Pennsylvania, United States

Sport
- Sport: Rowing

Vincent Deeney (January 23, 1915 – June 25, 1999) was an American rower. He competed in the men's coxed pair event at the 1948 Summer Olympics.
