= Agustín Muñiz =

Uruguayan boxer (born 1921)

Personal information
- Born: 28 August 1921 San Jose de Mayo, Uruguay

Sport
- Sport: Boxing

Agustín Muñiz (born 28 August 1921) was a Uruguayan boxer. He competed in the men's heavyweight event at the 1948 Summer Olympics.
