= Alberto Radi =

Italian rower

Medal record

Men's rowing

Representing Italy

Olympic Games
Silver medal – second place	1948 London	Coxed pair

Alberto Radi (10 December 1919 – 13 July 1989) was an Italian rower who competed in the 1948 Summer Olympics.

He was born in Trieste. In 1948 he was the coxswain of the Italian boat which won the silver medal in the coxed pair event.
