= Gerry Ó Colmáin =

Irish boxer

Personal information
- Nationality: Irish
- Born: 1924
- Died: 3 November 2008 (aged 83–84)

Sport
- Sport: Boxing

Gerry Ó Colmáin (1924 – 3 November 2008) was an Irish boxer. He competed in the men's heavyweight event at the 1948 Summer Olympics.
