= Fernand Bothy =

Belgian boxer (1926–2025)

Personal information
- Nationality: Belgian
- Born: 23 March 1926 Tamines, Belgium
- Died: 21 October 2025 (aged 99) Sambreville, Belgium

Sport
- Sport: Boxing

Fernand Bothy (23 March 1926 – 21 October 2025) was a Belgian boxer. He competed in the men's heavyweight event at the 1948 Summer Olympics.

Bothy died on 21 October 2025, at the age of 99.
