= Tarlao =

Tarlao is an Italian surname. Notable people with the surname include:

- Aldo Tarlao (1926–2018), Italian rower
- Andrea Tarlao (born 1994), Italian paralympic cyclist
