= Gunnar Nielsen =

Gunnar Nielsen may refer to:

- Gunnar Nielsen (actor) (1919–2009), Swedish film actor
- Gunnar Nielsen (athlete) (1928–1985), Danish athlete, former world record holder over 1500 metres
- Gunnar Nielsen (Argentine footballer) (born 1983), Argentine football midfielder
- Gunnar Nielsen (Faroese footballer) (born 1986), Faroese football goalkeeper

== See also ==
- Gunnar Nilsson (disambiguation)
- Gunnar Nelson (disambiguation)
