= Iakovidis Diakoumakos =

Greek rower (1913–1996)

Personal information
- Nationality: Greek
- Born: 1913
- Died: 1996 (aged 82–83)

Sport
- Sport: Rowing

Iakovidis Diakoumakos (1913–1996) was a Greek rower. He competed in the men's coxed pair event at the 1948 Summer Olympics.
