= Mark Scott (rower) =

British rower (1923–2013)

- Born: 17 April 1923; Christchurch, Hampshire, England
- Died: 11 February 2013 (aged 89); Henley-on-Thames, England
- Education: Bryanston School
- Alma mater: North London Polytechnic
- Occupation: Architect
- Known for: 1948 Summer Olympics rower

Mark Bodley Scott (17 April 1923 – 11 February 2013) was a British rower who competed in the 1948 Summer Olympics.

Scott was born into a medical family based in Dorset. He was the son of Maitland Bodley Scott (1878–1942) and the youngest of six sons. As a child, he lived in Shiplake on the River Thames.

Scott was educated at Bryanston School. Aged 18, he joined the Royal Naval Volunteer Reserve during World War II. While on active service in Sicily, he was wounded in a mortar bomb explosion, during which he lost one eye and his other eye was damaged by shrapnel. He was in hospital recuperating for almost a year in North Africa.

In 1946 when he was demobilised, he joined North London Polytechnic, studying architecture. He also joined the Thames Rowing Club. He rowed in the 1948 Henley Regatta and then for Britain at the 1948 Summer Olympics, in the coxed pairs event, with Bakie James.

Mark Bodley Scott was involved in local government, including Sonning Parish Council and Wokingham Rural District Council. He was also chair of Sonning Working Men’s Club.

In 1953, Scott married Josephine Clare Stanley, also an architect, and they had three children. In 2006, they moved from Sonning-on-Thames, where they had lived for 53 years, to Henley-on-Thames, where Mark Bodley Scott died. A voice recording can be heard at the River and Rowing Museum in Henley-on-Thames.

== See also ==
- Ronald Bodley Scott (1906–1982), his brother
- Rowing at the 1948 Summer Olympics – Men's coxed pair
