= Antal Szendey =

Hungarian rower

Personal information
- Born: 7 March 1915 Erzsébetfalva
- Died: 6 May 1994 (aged 79) Budapest

Sport
- Sport: Rowing
Medal record
Men's rowing
Representing Hungary
Olympic Games
Bronze medal – third place	1948 London	Coxed pair
European Rowing Championships
Gold medal – first place	1935 Berlin	Eight
Bronze medal – third place	1937 Amsterdam	Coxless four
Silver medal – second place	1938 Milan	Eight
Gold medal – first place	1947 Lucerne	Coxed pair

Antal Szendey (7 March 1915 – 6 May 1994) was a Hungarian rower who competed in the 1936 Summer Olympics and in the 1948 Summer Olympics.

He was born in Erzsébetfalva. In 1936 he was a crew member of the Hungarian boat which finished fifth in the eight event. At the 1947 European Rowing Championships in Lucerne, he won a gold medal in the coxed pair event. At the 1948 Summer Olympics in London, he won the bronze medal with the Hungarian boat in the coxed pair competition.

He died in Budapest in 1994.
