= Ampelio Sartor =

French rower

Personal information
- Nationality: French
- Born: 28 May 1921; Montebelluna, Italy
- Died: 30 June 2000 (aged 79); Sainte-Foy-la-Grande, France

Sport
- Sport: Rowing

Ampelio Sartor (28 May 1921 – 30 June 2000) was a French rower. He competed in the men's coxed pair event at the 1948 Summer Olympics.

He was the brother of fellow rower Aristide Sartor.
