= Gunnar Nelson =

Gunnar Nelson may refer to:

- Gunnar Nelson (musician), American musician, singer, and songwriter
- Gunnar Nelson (fighter) (born 1988), Icelandic mixed martial artist

== See also ==
- Gunnar Nielsen (disambiguation)
- Gunnar Nilsson (disambiguation)
