= Joseph Toland =

American rower

Personal information
- Born: December 22, 1928 Philadelphia, Pennsylvania, United States
- Died: July 18, 2002 (aged 73) Abington, Pennsylvania, United States

Sport
- Sport: Rowing

Joseph Toland (December 22, 1928 – July 18, 2002) was an American rower. He competed in the men's coxed pair event at the 1948 Summer Olympics.
