= Hanafi Moustafa =

Egyptian weightlifter

Personal information
- Nationality: Egyptian
- Born: Cairo, Egypt

Sport
- Sport: Weightlifting

Hanafi Moustafa was an Egyptian weightlifter. He competed in the men's heavyweight event at the 1948 Summer Olympics.
