= Predrag Saric =

Predrag Saric may refer to:

- Predrag Sarić (1921–1979), Croatian rower
- Predrag Šarić (born 1959), Croatian basketball player
