= Marko Horvatin =

Croatian rower

Personal information
- Nationality: Croatian
- Born: 14 October 1919; Zagreb, Kingdom of Serbs, Croats, and Slovenes
- Died: 13 March 2011 (aged 91); Toronto, Ontario, Canada

Sport
- Sport: Rowing

Marko Horvatin (14 October 1919 – 13 March 2011) was a Croatian rower. He competed for Yugoslavia in the men's coxed pair event at the 1948 Summer Olympics.
