= Carlos Kirkpatrick =

Spanish equestrian

Personal information
- Nationality: Spanish
- Born: 8 November 1907; Madrid, Spain
- Died: 22 March 1975 (aged 67); Madrid, Spain

Sport
- Sport: Equestrian

Carlos Kirkpatrick (8 November 1907 – 22 March 1975) was a Spanish equestrian who competed in the individual dressage event at the 1948 Summer Olympics.
