= Vladeta Ristić =

Yugoslav rower

Personal information
- Nationality: Yugoslav
- Born: 5 March 1922
- Died: 18 December 1971 (aged 49)

Sport
- Sport: Rowing

Vladeta Ristić (5 March 1922 – 18 December 1971) was a Yugoslav rower. He competed in the men's coxed pair event at the 1948 Summer Olympics.
