= Rowing at the 1948 Summer Olympics – Men's coxed pair =

Men's coxed pairs at the Games of the XIV Olympiad
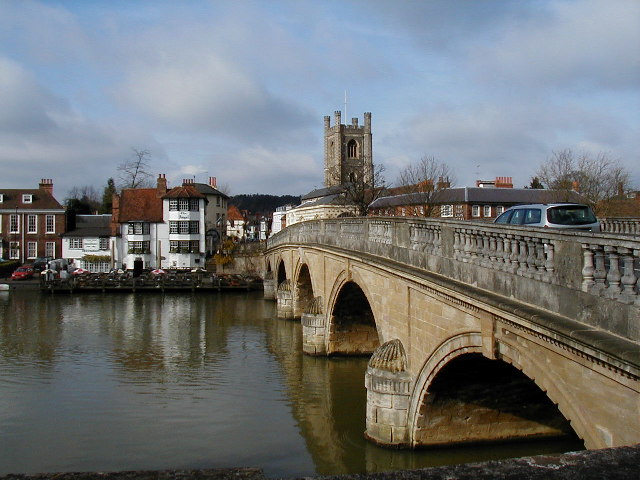
- Henley-on-Thames
- Venue: Henley-on-Thames
- Dates: 5–9 August 1948
- Competitors: 28 from 9 nations
- Winning time: 8:00.5

Medalists
1st place, gold medalist(s)		Finn Pedersen; Tage Henriksen; Carl-Ebbe Andersen; Denmark
2nd place, silver medalist(s)		Giovanni Steffè; Aldo Tarlao; Alberto Radi; Italy
3rd place, bronze medalist(s)		Antal Szendey; Béla Zsitnik; Róbert Zimonyi; Hungary

The men's coxed pair competition at the 1948 Summer Olympics in London took place at Henley-on-Thames, London. It was held from 5 to 9 August. There were 9 boats (28 competitors) from 9 nations, with each nation limited to a single boat in the event. The event was won by the Danish team, rowers Finn Pedersen and Tage Henriksen and coxswain Carl-Ebbe Andersen; it was the first medal in the men's coxed pair for Denmark. Italy won its second consecutive silver medal (though 12 years apart), with Giovanni Steffè, Aldo Tarlao, and cox Alberto Radi. Hungary also earned its first medal in the event, a bronze for Antal Szendey, Béla Zsitnik, and cox Róbert Zimonyi. The French three-Games pre-war podium streak ended.

== Background ==
This was the seventh appearance of the event. Rowing had been on the programme in 1896 but was cancelled due to bad weather. The men's coxed pair was one of the original four events in 1900, but was not held in 1904, 1908, or 1912. It returned to the programme after World War I and was held every Games from 1924 to 1992, when it (along with the men's coxed four) was replaced with the men's lightweight double sculls and men's lightweight coxless four.

None of the 18 competitors from the 1936 coxed pair final returned. The Hungarian rowers were a slight favorite; Antal Szendey and Béla Zsitnik were the reigning European champions.

Argentina, Great Britain, and Greece each made their debut in the event. France made its seventh appearance, the only nation to have competed in all editions of the event to that point.

== Competition format ==
The coxed pair event featured three-person boats, with two rowers and a coxswain. It was a sweep rowing event, with the rowers each having one oar (and thus each rowing on one side). The tournament expanded to four rounds: quarterfinals, a repechage, semifinals, and a final.

The venue, Henley-on-Thames, imposed certain restrictions and modifications to the format. The course could handle only three boats at a time (and this required expansion of the typical Henley course), so the six-boat final introduced in 1936 was not possible this time. The course distance was also modified; instead of either the 2000 metres distance that was standard for the Olympics or the 1 mile 550 yards (2112 metres) standard at Henley, a course that was somewhat shorter than either was used. Sources disagree on the exact distance: 1929 metres is listed by the Official Report, though other sources say 1850 metres.

- Quarterfinals: There were 4 quarterfinals, ranging from 1 to 3 boats each. The winner of each heat (4 boats total) advanced directly to the semifinals; all other boats (5 boats total) went to the repechage.
- Repechage: There were 2 repechage heats, with 2 or 3 boats each. The winner of each heat (2 boats) rejoined the quarterfinal winners in the semifinals; all other boats (3 total) were eliminated.
- Semifinals: There were 3 semifinals, each with 2 boats. The winner of each heat advanced to the final; the remaining boats were eliminated.
- Final: A single final, with 3 boats.

== Schedule ==
All times are British Summer Time (UTC+1)

Date	Time	Round
Thursday, 5 August 1948		Quarterfinals
Friday, 6 August 1948		Repechage
Saturday, 7 August 1948	12:30	Semifinals
Monday, 9 August 1948	16:00	Final

== Results ==
The following rowers took part:

=== Quarterfinals ===
==== Quarterfinal 1 ====
Rank	Rowers	Coxswain	Nation	Time	Notes
1	Vladeta Ristić; Marko Horvatin	Predrag Sarić	Yugoslavia	7:59.0	Q
2	Mark Scott; Howard James	David Walker	Great Britain	8:06.8	R
3	Vincent Deeney; Joseph Toland	John McIntyre	United States	8:13.3	R

==== Quarterfinal 2 ====
Rank	Rowers	Coxswain	Nation	Time	Notes
1	Giovanni Steffè; Aldo Tarlao	Alberto Radi	Italy	7:47.6	Q
2	Finn Pedersen; Tage Henriksen	Carl-Ebbe Andersen	Denmark	7:51.7	R
3	Antal Szendey; Béla Zsitnik	Róbert Zimonyi	Hungary	8:19.7	R

==== Quarterfinal 3 ====
Rank	Rowers	Coxswain	Nation	Time	Notes
1	Ampelio Sartor; Aristide Sartor	Roger Crezen	France	8:01.7	Q
2	Iakovidis Diakoumakos; Georgios Venieris	Grigorios Emmanouil	Greece	8:21.9	R

==== Quarterfinal 4 ====
Rank	Rowers	Coxswain	Nation	Time	Notes
1	Pedro Towers; Ramón Porcel	Juan Parker	Argentina	WO	Q

=== Repechage ===
==== Repechage heat 1 ====
Rank	Rowers	Coxswain	Nation	Time	Notes
1	Antal Szendey; Béla Zsitnik	Róbert Zimonyi	Hungary	7:56.4	Q
2	Vincent Deeney; Joseph Toland	John McIntyre	United States	8:09.2	
3	Iakovidis Diakoumakos; Georgios Venieris	Grigorios Emmanouil	Greece	8:17.3	

==== Repechage heat 2 ====
Rank	Rowers	Coxswain	Nation	Time	Notes
1	Finn Pedersen; Tage Henriksen	Carl-Ebbe Andersen	Denmark	7:51.2	Q
2	Mark Scott; Howard James	David Walker	Great Britain	8:01.7	

=== Semifinals ===
==== Semifinal 1 ====
Rank	Rowers	Coxswain	Nation	Time	Notes
1	Finn Pedersen; Tage Henriksen	Carl-Ebbe Andersen	Denmark	8:12.7	Q
2	Ampelio Sartor; Aristide Sartor	Roger Crezen	France	8:14.9	

==== Semifinal 2 ====
Rank	Rowers	Coxswain	Nation	Time	Notes
1	Antal Szendey; Béla Zsitnik	Róbert Zimonyi	Hungary	8:15.7	Q
2	Pedro Towers; Ramón Porcel	Juan Parker	Argentina	8:27.7	

==== Semifinal 3 ====
Rank	Rowers	Coxswain	Nation	Time	Notes
1	Giovanni Steffè; Aldo Tarlao	Alberto Radi	Italy	8:04.2	Q
2	Vladeta Ristić; Marko Horvatin	Duško Đorđević	Yugoslavia	8:07.9	

=== Final ===
Rank	Rowers	Coxswain	Nation	Time
1st place, gold medalist(s)	Finn Pedersen; Tage Henriksen	Carl-Ebbe Andersen	Denmark	8:00.5
2nd place, silver medalist(s)	Giovanni Steffè; Aldo Tarlao	Alberto Radi	Italy	8:12.2
3rd place, bronze medalist(s)	Antal Szendey; Béla Zsitnik	Róbert Zimonyi	Hungary	8:25.2

== Results summary ==
Rank	Rowers	Coxswain	Nation	Quarterfinals	Repechage	Semifinals	Final
1st place, gold medalist(s)	Finn Pedersen; Tage Henriksen	Carl-Ebbe Andersen	Denmark	7:51.7	7:51.2	8:12.7	8:00.5
2nd place, silver medalist(s)	Giovanni Steffè; Aldo Tarlao	Alberto Radi	Italy	7:47.6	Bye	8:04.2	8:12.2
3rd place, bronze medalist(s)	Antal Szendey; Béla Zsitnik	Róbert Zimonyi	Hungary	8:19.7	7:56.4	8:15.7	8:25.2
4	Vladeta Ristić; Marko Horvatin	Predrag Sarić (quarters); Duško Đorđević (semis)	Yugoslavia	7:59.0	Bye	8:07.9	Did not advance
5	Ampelio Sartor; Aristide Sartor	Roger Crezen	France	8:01.7	Bye	8:14.9	Did not advance
6	Pedro Towers; Ramón Porcel	Juan Parker	Argentina	WO	Bye	8:27.7	Did not advance
7	Mark Scott; Howard James	David Walker	Great Britain	8:06.8	8:01.7	Did not advance	
8	Vincent Deeney; Joseph Toland	John McIntyre	United States	8:13.3	8:09.2	Did not advance	
9	Iakovidis Diakoumakos; Georgios Venieris	Grigorios Emmanouil	Greece	8:21.9	8:17.3	Did not advance	
