= Carl-Ebbe Andersen =

Danish rower (1929–2009)

Personal information
- Born: 19 January 1929 Roskilde, Denmark
- Died: 14 June 2009 (aged 80) Roskilde, Denmark

Sport
- Sport: Rowing
Medal record
Men's rowing
Representing Denmark
Olympic Games
Gold medal – first place	1948 London	Coxed pair
European Rowing Championships
Bronze medal – third place	1947 Lucerne	Coxed pair

Carl-Ebbe Andersen (19 January 1929 – 14 June 2009) was a Danish coxswain who competed in the 1948 Summer Olympics. He was born in Roskilde. In 1948 he was the coxswain of the Danish boat which won the gold medal in the coxed pair event.
