= Alfonso Parera =

Cuban weightlifter

Personal information
- Nationality: Cuban
- Born: 19 September 1922
- Died: 28 June 1996 (aged 73) Fort Lauderdale, Florida, United States

Sport
- Sport: Weightlifting

Achievements and titles
- Olympic finals: 1948 Summer Olympics

Alfonso Parera (19 September 1922 – 28 June 1996) was a Cuban weightlifter. He competed in the men's heavyweight event at the 1948 Summer Olympics.
