= Béla Zsitnik =

Hungarian rower (1924–2019)

Medal record

Men's rowing

Representing Hungary

Olympic Games
Bronze medal – third place	1948 London	Coxed pair

Béla Zsitnik (17 December 1924 – 12 January 2019) was a Hungarian rower who competed in the 1948, 1952, and 1960 Summer Olympics.

== Early life ==
He was born in Győr and is the father of Béla Zsitnik Jr. In 1948 he was a crew member of the Hungarian boat which won the bronze in the coxed pairs event. Four years later he was eliminated with the Hungarian boat in the semi-final repechage of the eight competition. At the 1960 Games he was part of the Hungarian boat which was eliminated in the repechage of the coxless four event.
