= Ronald Bodley Scott =

English haematologist (1906–1982)

Sir Ronald Bodley Scott
- Born: 10 September 1906; Christchurch, Hampshire, England
- Died: 12 May 1982 (aged 75); Italy
- Occupations: Haematologist and oncologist
- Known for: clinical description of histiocytic medullary reticulosis

Sir Ronald Bodley Scott GCVO FRCP (10 September 1906 – 12 May 1982) was an English haematologist and expert on therapy for leukemia and lymphoma.

== Biography ==
After education at Marlborough College, he matriculated at Brasenose College, Oxford, where in 1928 he graduated BA in natural sciences. He then studied at the medical college of St Bartholomew's Hospital, where he was influenced by Walter Langdon-Brown, Thomas Horder, and Francis Fraser. He graduated BM BCh in 1931 from the University of Oxford. He qualified MRCP in 1933. He first joined his father, Dr Maitland Bodley Scott, in his medical practice in Bournemouth, but soon returned to St Bartholomew's Hospital as chief assistant to Alexander Edward Gow (1884–1952). R. Bodley Scott's work on bone marrow aspiration formed the basis of his higher DM thesis in 1937 at the University of Oxford. In 1939 he, in collaboration with A. H. T. Robb-Smith, described the clinical manifestations of malignant histiocytosis.

When WWII began, Scott had just obtained an appointment as consultant physician to the Memorial Hospital, Woolwich. He joined the RAMC and early in 1941 was posted to the Middle East, where he served for four and a half years. There he was promoted in 1942 to lieutenant-colonel in charge of medicine in the 63rd General Hospital in Cairo. After demobilisation, he was appointed in 1946 a full physician at St Bartholomew's Hospital. He became a leading expert on leukemia and cancer chemotherapy.

Scott was elected FRCP in 1943. He was appointed in 1949 physician to the Household of King George VI and in 1952 physician to Queen Elizabeth II. He was made KCVO in 1964 and GVCO in 1973. He was consultant physician to several institutions.

He was in 1957 the Lettsomian Lecturer to the Medical Society of London. Under the auspices of the Royal College of Physicians, he was in 1957 the Langdon-Brown Lecturer, in 1970 the Croonian Lecturer, and in 1976 the Harveian Orator.

He was interested in literature, contributing an article to the Lancet on ‘The doctor in contemporary literature’ — an amusing look at doctors in the detective novels he enjoyed. He also wrote a little on the history of medicine, contributing a perceptive history of medicine at his own hospital in the first part of the twentieth century to the anniversary commemoration volume produced in 1973.

R. Bodley Scott was president of the Medical Society of London in 1965–1966) and president of the British Society for Haematology in 1966–1967. St Bartholomew's Hospital created in his honour the Sir Ronald Bodley Scott Professorship of Cardiovascular Medicine.

He edited the 10th (1966), 11th (1973), and 12th (1979) editions of Price's Textbook of the Practice of Medicine. From the 1960s until his death in 1982, he was a co-editor of Medical Annual: A Yearbook of Treatment and Practitioners' Index, first with the surgeon R. Milnes Walker, CBE, FRCS and then with Sir John Fraser. Scott's book Cancer: The Facts was published in 1979.

== Family ==
Ronald Bodley Scott was one of six sons from his father's marriage. R. Bodley Scott's father, Maitland Bodley Scott (1878–1942), was elected FRCSE and was appointed OBE for his RAMC service as a surgical specialist in Mesopotamia in the First World War. In 1931 R. Bodley Scott married Edith Daphne McCarthy (d. 1977), daughter of Lieutenant Colonel E. McCarthy RMA. There were two daughters from R. Bodley Scott's first marriage. He married in 1980 Jessie Gaston, widow of Dr Alex Gaston of Sevenoaks, Kent. His brother Mark Bodley Scott (1923–2013) was a rower who competed in the 1948 Summer Olympics.

== Selected publications ==
- Scott RB (15 October 1938). "The Sarcoidosis of Boeck". Br Med J. 2 (4058): 777–781, 800–1. doi:10.1136/bmj.2.4058.777. PMC 2210923. PMID 20781806.
- Scott RB (29 March 1952). "Some Medical Aspects of Tobacco-smoking". Br Med J. 1 (4760): 671–675. doi:10.1136/bmj.1.4760.671. PMC 2023152. PMID 14905029.
- Scott RB (4 January 1958). "The Chemotherapy of Malignant Disease". Br Med J. 1 (5061): 1–7. doi:10.1136/bmj.1.5061.1. PMC 2026603. PMID 13489293. (Langdon-Brown Lecture)
