= Howard James =

British rower

Personal information
- Nationality: British
- Born: 18 November 1923
- Died: 14 March 2000 (aged 76)

Sport
- Sport: Rowing

Howard James (18 November 1923 – 14 March 2000) was a British rower. He competed in the men's coxed pair event at the 1948 Summer Olympics.
