= John McIntyre (American rower) =

American rower (1928–2018)

Personal information
- Born: September 3, 1928 Philadelphia, Pennsylvania, United States
- Died: January 5, 2018 (aged 89)

Sport
- Sport: Rowing

John McIntyre (September 3, 1928 – January 5, 2018) was an American rower. He competed in the men's coxed pair event at the 1948 Summer Olympics.
