= Franz Eibler =

Austrian weightlifter

Personal information
- Nationality: Austrian
- Born: 19 May 1924
- Died: 3 March 2010 (aged 85)

Sport
- Sport: Weightlifting

Franz Eibler (19 May 1924 – 3 March 2010) was an Austrian weightlifter. He competed in the men's heavyweight event at the 1948 Summer Olympics.
