= Giovanni Steffè =

Italian rower

Personal information
- Born: 8 March 1928
- Died: 19 October 2016 (aged 88)

Sport
- Sport: Rowing
Medal record
Men's rowing
Representing Italy
Olympic Games
Silver medal – second place	1948 London	Coxed pair
European Rowing Championships
Silver medal – second place	1947 Lucerne	Coxed pair

Giovanni Steffè (8 March 1928 – 19 October 2016) was an Italian rower who competed in the 1948 Summer Olympics.

He was born in Trieste in 1928. In 1948 he was a crew member of the Italian boat which won the silver medal in the coxed pair event. He died on 19 October 2016.
