= David Walker (rower) =

British rower (1932–2014)

Personal information
- Nationality: British
- Born: 10 June 1932
- Died: 24 March 2014 (aged 81)

Sport
- Sport: Rowing

David Secker Walker (10 June 1932 – 24 March 2014) was a British rower. He competed in the men's coxed pair event at the 1948 Summer Olympics.

Walker died on 24 March 2014, at the age of 81.
