= Niels Petersen (weightlifter) =

Danish weightlifter (1918–1966)

Personal information
- Nationality: Danish
- Born: 12 February 1918 Kerteminde, Denmark
- Died: 22 August 1966 (aged 48) Copenhagen, Denmark

Sport
- Sport: Weightlifting

Niels Petersen (12 February 1918 – 22 August 1966) was a Danish weightlifter. He competed in the men's heavyweight event at the 1948 Summer Olympics.
