= Víctor Bignon =

Chilean boxer (1925–2007)

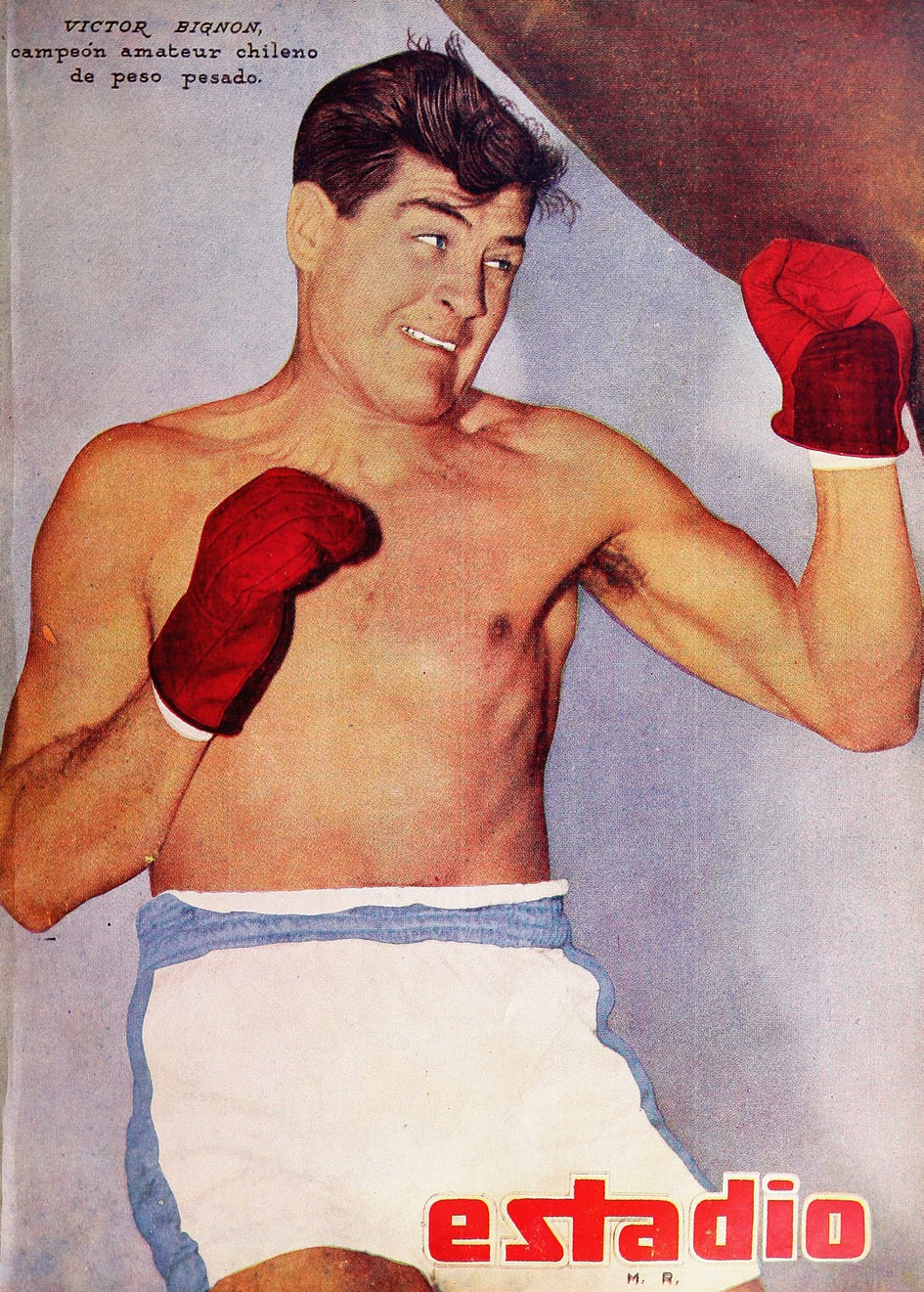

Personal information
- Born: 7 September 1925 Santiago, Chile
- Died: 27 October 2007 (aged 82) Santiago, Chile

Sport
- Sport: Boxing
Medal record
Men's amateur boxing
Representing Chile
Pan American Games
Silver medal – second place	1951 Buenos Aires	Heavyweight

Víctor Eduardo Bignon Guzmán (7 September 1925 – 27 October 2007) was a Chilean boxer. He was born in Santiago to a French father and a Chilean mother. He competed in the men's heavyweight event at the 1948 Summer Olympics. At the 1948 Summer Olympics, he lost to Adam Faul of Canada.
