= Raúl Calvo =

Argentine basketball player

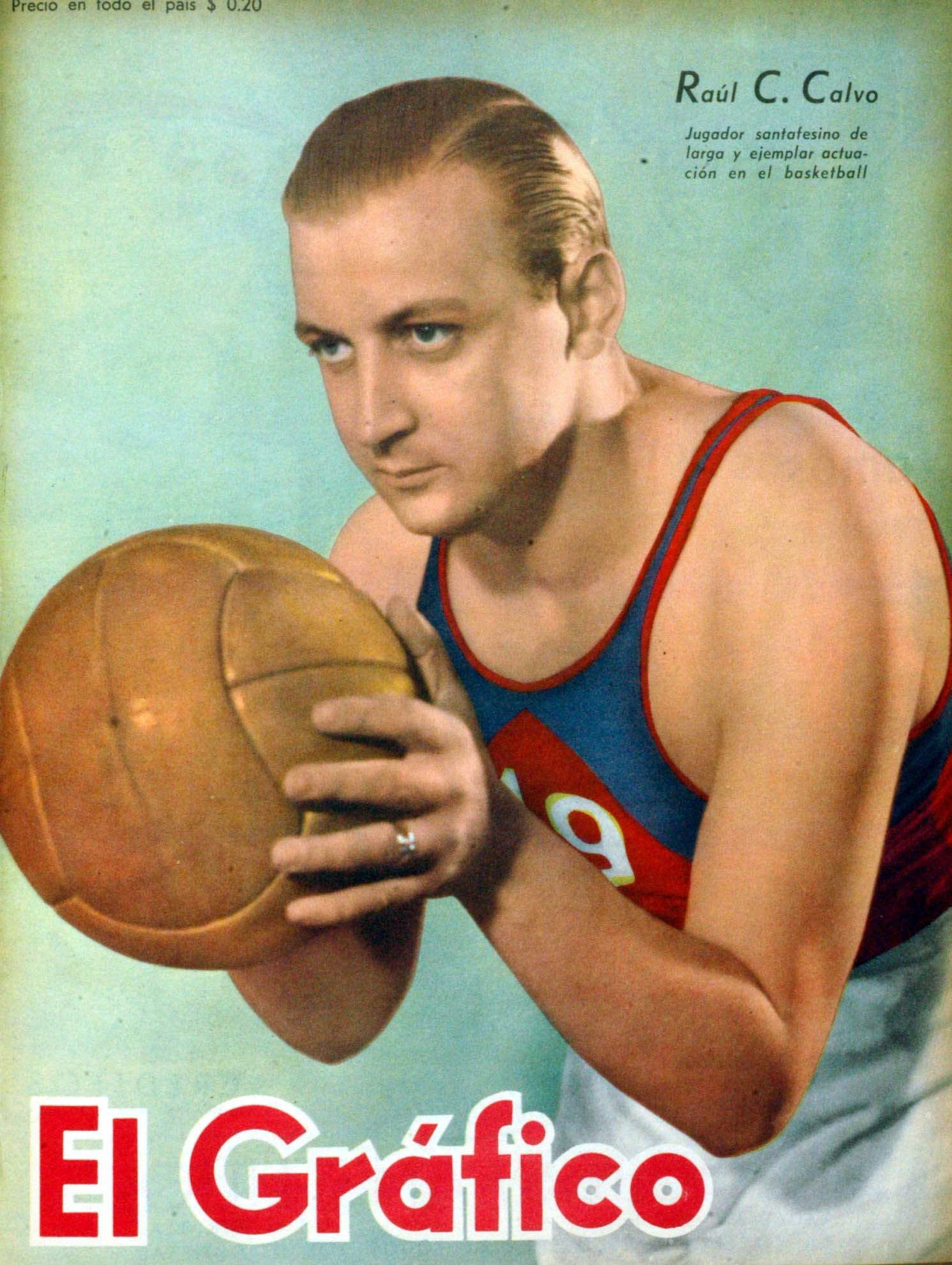
- Raúl Calvo in 1947.

Personal information
- Nationality: Argentine
- Born: May 8, 1917
- Died: September 9, 1996 (aged 79)

Sport
- Sport: Basketball

Raúl Calvo (8 May 1917 – 9 September 1996) was an Argentine basketball player who competed in the 1948 Summer Olympics when they finished 15th.
