= Adriana Camelli =

Argentine swimmer

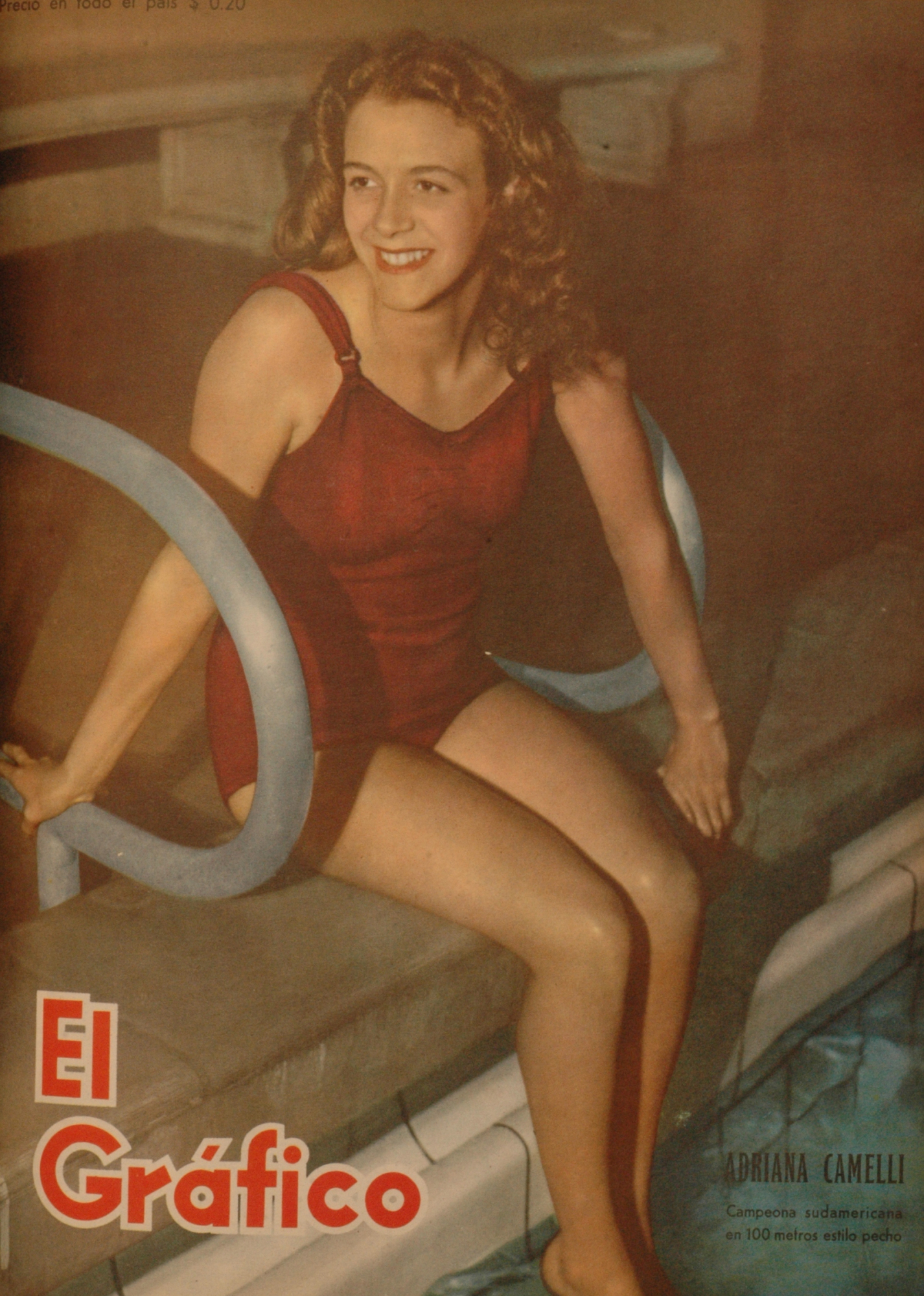
- Camelli in 1946

Personal information
- Nationality: Argentina
- Born: 17 March 1928 Tartagal, Salta, Argentina
- Died: 18 January 1996 (aged 67) Santa Fe, Argentina

Sport
- Sport: Swimming
- Strokes: Freestyle

Adriana Camelli (17 March 1928 – 18 January 1996) was an Argentine swimmer who competed at the 1948 Summer Olympics.
