= Henry France =

Ghanaian footballer

Personal information
- Date of birth: 1947
- Date of death: 10 May 2005 (aged 57–58)
- Position: Goalkeeper

International career
Years	Team	Apps	(Gls)
- Ghana

Henry France (1947 – 10 May 2005) was a Ghanaian footballer. He competed in the men's tournament at the 1972 Summer Olympics.
