= Juan Parker =

Argentine rower

Personal information
- Born: 11 February 1918; Buenos Aires, Argentina
- Died: 6 June 2001 (aged 83); San Fernando, Argentina

Sport
- Sport: Rowing

Juan Parker (11 February 1918 – 6 June 2001) was an Argentine rower. He competed in the men's coxed pair event at the 1948 Summer Olympics.
