= Piet Taljaard =

South African weightlifter (1914–1950)

Personal information
- Full name: Petrus Cornelius Taljaard
- Nationality: South African
- Born: April 1914; Parow, Cape Town, South Africa
- Died: 8 March 1950 (aged 35); Observatory, Cape Town, South Africa
- Weight: 105 kg (231 lb)

Sport
- Sport: Weightlifting

Petrus Cornelius Taljaard (April 1914 – 8 March 1950) was a South African weightlifter. He competed in the men's heavyweight event at the 1948 Summer Olympics.
