= Hans Müller (boxer) =

Swiss boxer (1915–1967)

Personal information
- Nationality: Swiss
- Born: 22 December 1915
- Died: 30 April 1967 (aged 51)

Sport
- Sport: Boxing

Hans Müller (22 December 1915 – 30 April 1967) was a Swiss boxer. He competed in the men's heavyweight event at the 1948 Summer Olympics.
