= Boxing at the 1948 Summer Olympics – Heavyweight =

Men's heavyweight at the Games of the XIV Olympiad
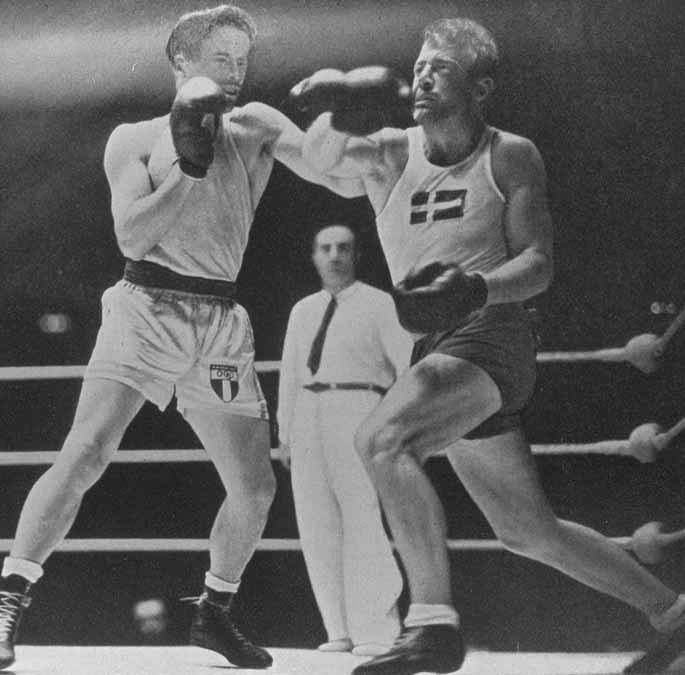
- Rafael Iglesias vs Gunnar Nilsson, London Olympics 1948.
- Venue: Earl's Court; Wembley Arena
- Date: 9–13 August 1948
- Competitors: 17 from 17 nations

Medalists
1st place, gold medalist(s)		Rafael Iglesias	Argentina
2nd place, silver medalist(s)		Gunnar Nilsson	Sweden
3rd place, bronze medalist(s)		John Arthur	South Africa

The men's heavyweight boxing competition at the 1948 Olympic Games in London, England, was held from 9 to 13 August at the Empress Hall in Earl's Court and the Wembley Arena.

== Competition format ==
Like all Olympic boxing events, the competition was a straight single-elimination tournament. The competition began with a preliminary round on 9 August, where the number of competitors was reduced to 16, and concluded with a final on 13 August. As there were less than 32 boxers in the competition, a number of boxers received a bye for the preliminary round. All bouts consisted of three periods where the boxers received points for every successful punch they land on their opponent's head or upper body. The boxer with the most points at the end of the bouts wins. If a boxer is knocked to the ground and cannot get up before the referee counts to 10 then the bout is over and the opponent wins.

== Results ==
Round of 32
Jay Lambert (USA)	PTS
Vicente dos Santos (BRA)

Round of 16
Adam Faul (CAN)	PTS
Víctor Bignon (CHI)
Gunnar Nilsson (SWE)	DSQ-2
Mohammad Jamshidabadi (IRI)
Agustín Muñiz (URU)
Hans Müller (SUI)	KO-2
Karl Ameisbichler (AUT)
Jack Gardner (GBR)	KO-2
Uber Baccilieri (ITA)	PTS
Gerry Ó Colmáin (IRL)
José Arturo Rubio (ESP)
Rafael Iglesias (ARG)	PTS
John Arthur (RSA)	RSC-1
James Galli (FRA)
Fernand Bothy (BEL)
Jay Lambert (USA)	PTS

Quarter-finals
Adam Faul (CAN)
Gunnar Nilsson (SWE)	PTS
Hans Müller (SUI)	PTS
Jack Gardner (GBR)
Uber Baccilieri (ITA)
Rafael Iglesias (ARG)	PTS
John Arthur (RSA)	PTS
Jay Lambert (USA)

Semi-finals
Gunnar Nilsson (SWE)	PTS
Hans Müller (SUI)
Rafael Iglesias (ARG)	PTS
John Arthur (RSA)

Final
Gunnar Nilsson (SWE)
Rafael Iglesias (ARG)	KO-2
Third place
Hans Müller (SUI)
John Arthur (RSA)	WO
