= Tommie Quinn =

Argentine field hockey player

Tomás Miguel "Tommie" Quinn y Donlon (August 19, 1927 – January 21, 1970) was a field hockey player, who competed for Argentina at the 1948 Summer Olympics, he played in all three group games.
