= Ramón Porcel =

Argentine rower

Personal information
- Born: 11 December 1921; Buenos Aires, Argentina
- Died: 14 October 2003 (aged 81)

Sport
- Sport: Rowing

Ramón Porcel (11 December 1921 – 14 October 2003) was an Argentine rower. He competed in the men's coxed pair event at the 1948 Summer Olympics.
