= Jorge Wilson =

Argentinean field hockey player

Jorge Héctor Wilson (25 January 1915 – 8 March 1998) was a field hockey player, who competed for Argentina at the 1948 Summer Olympics, he played in two group games.
