= Horacio Siburu =

Argentine modern pentathlete

Personal information
- Born: 18 March 1922 Concordia, Entre Ríos, Argentina
- Died: 10 April 2000 (aged 78)

Sport
- Sport: Modern pentathlon

Horacio Siburu Libarona (18 March 1922 – 10 April 2000) was an Argentine modern pentathlete. He competed at the 1948 Summer Olympics.
