= James Galli =

French boxer

Personal information
- Nationality: French
- Born: 10 May 1923; Auboué, France
- Died: 20 June 2005 (aged 82)

Sport
- Sport: Boxing

James Galli (10 May 1923 – 20 June 2005) was a French boxer. He competed in the men's heavyweight event at the 1948 Summer Olympics.
