= Uber Baccilieri =

Italian boxer

Personal information
- Nationality: Italian
- Born: 26 July 1923; Copparo, Italy
- Died: 28 January 2007 (aged 83); Ferrara, Italy

Sport
- Sport: Boxing

Uber Baccilieri (26 July 1923 – 28 January 2007) was an Italian boxer. He competed in the men's heavyweight event at the 1948 Summer Olympics.
