= Bruno Varani =

Argentine basketball player (1925–2005)

Bruno José Varani (16 September 1925 – 25 July 2005) was an Argentine basketball player who competed in the 1948 Summer Olympics. His team finished 15th.

Varani was born in Santa Fe, Argentina on 16 September 1925, and died in Pinamar, Provincia de Buenos Aires, Argentina on 25 July 2005, at the age of 79.
