= Oscar Pérez (basketball) =

Argentine basketball player

Personal information
- Nationality: Argentine
- Born: 4 November 1922
- Died: 15 March 2002 (aged 79)

Sport
- Sport: Basketball

Oscar Pérez (4 November 1922 – 15 March 2002) was an Argentine basketball player who competed in the 1948 Summer Olympics when they finished 15th.
