= Luis Bianchi =

Argentine field hockey player (c. 1925–2017)

Luis Bianchi (c. 1925 – 23 July 2017) was a field hockey player who competed for Argentina at the 1948 Summer Olympics, he played in all three group games.
