= Enrique Wirth =

Argentine modern pentathlete (1925–1999)

Personal information
- Full name: Enrique Jorge Wirth
- Born: 25 January 1925 Córdoba, Argentina
- Died: 25 March 1999 (aged 74) Buenos Aires, Argentina

Sport
- Sport: Modern pentathlon

Enrique Jorge Wirth (25 January 1925 – 25 March 1999) was an Argentine modern pentathlete. He competed at the 1948 Summer Olympics. Wirth died in Buenos Aires on 25 March 1999, at the age of 74.
