= Abraham Charité =

Dutch weightlifter (1917–1991)

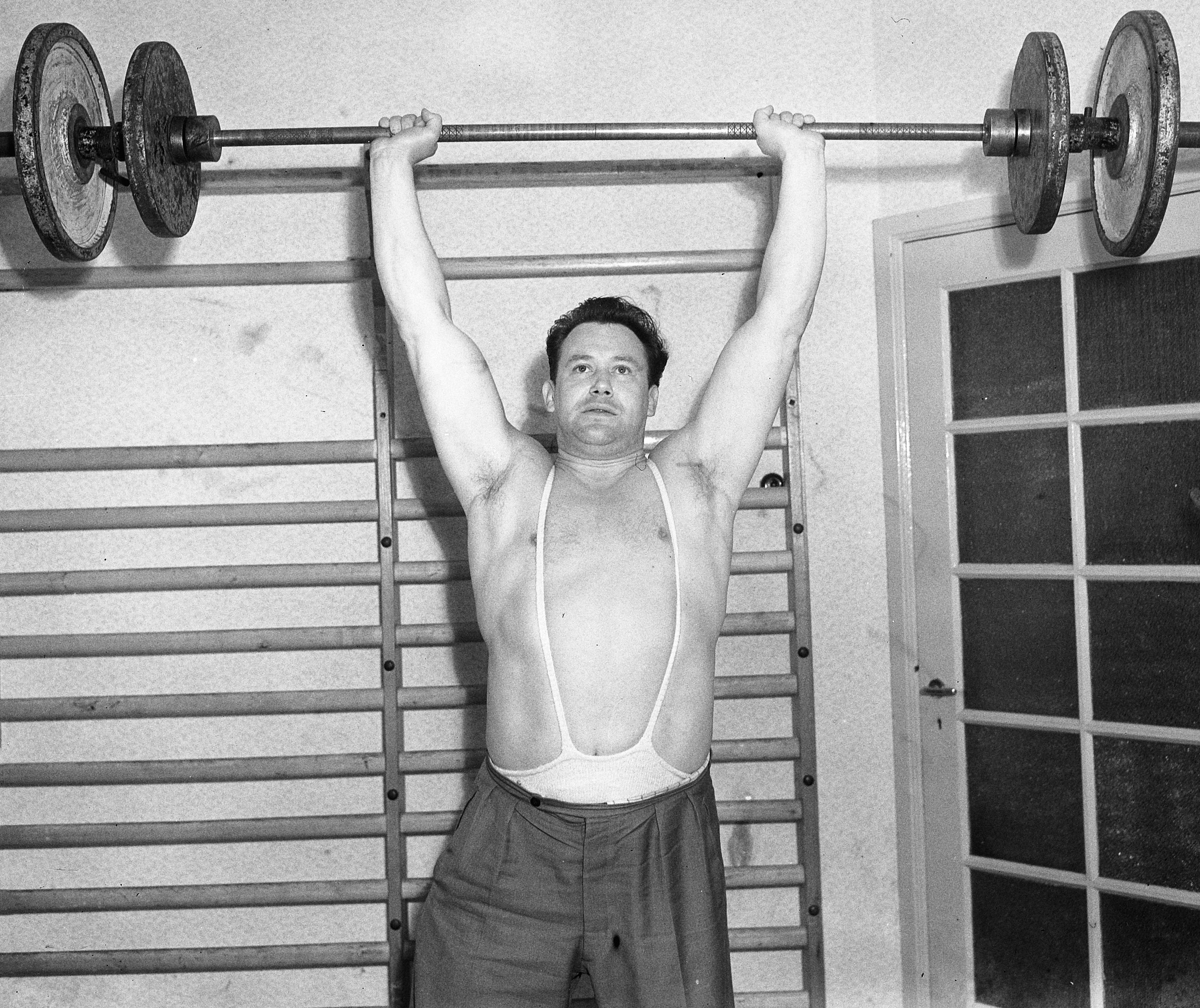
- Abraham Charité in 1952

Personal information
- Nationality: Dutch
- Born: 25 August 1917 The Hague, South Holland, Netherlands
- Died: 26 February 1991 (aged 73) The Hague, South Holland, Netherlands

Sport
- Sport: Weightlifting
- Weight class: Heavyweight
Medal record
Men's weightlifting
Representing Netherlands
Olympic Games
Bronze medal – third place	1948 London	Heavyweight

Abraham Charité (25 August 1917 – 26 February 1991) was a Dutch weightlifter. He was born and died in The Hague. He won a bronze medal in the heavyweight class at the 1948 Summer Olympics in London, breaking national records in all three moves. As of 2014 this remains the last Olympic medal in weightlifting for the Netherlands. The 1948 Olympics also counted as European Championships, and thus Charité became a 1948 European champion as the gold and silver medals were won by Americans.

Charité also competed at the 1952 Olympics, but withdrew due to back pains.
