= Valerio Sánchez =

Argentinian field hockey player (born c. 1902)

Valerio Sánchez (born c. 1902) was a field hockey player who competed for Argentina at the 1948 Summer Olympics. He played in one group game against Spain.
