= Alfred Knight (weightlifter) =

British weightlifter

Personal information
- Nationality: British
- Born: 5 May 1918; Northampton, England
- Died: 19 July 2000 (aged 82); Northampton, England

Sport
- Sport: Weightlifting

Alfred Charles Knight (5 May 1918 – 19 July 2000) was a British weightlifter. He competed in the men's heavyweight event at the 1948 Summer Olympics.
