= Sixto Ibáñez =

Argentine racewalker (1909–1980)

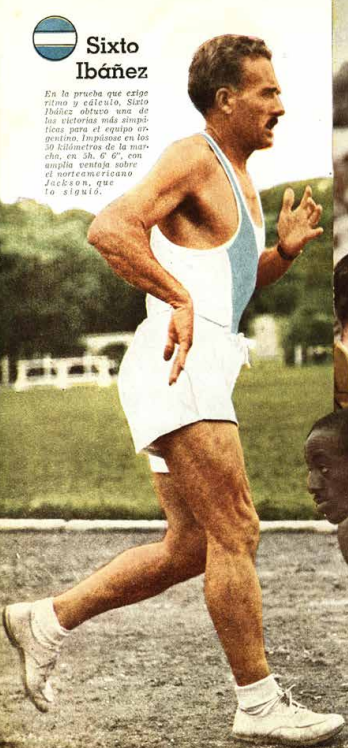
Argentine athlete Sixto Ibáñez

Sixto Ibáñez (2 April 1909 – 11 November 1980) was an Argentine racewalker who competed in the 1948 Summer Olympics. Ibáñez died on 11 November 1980, at the age of 71.
