= Hugo Vallarino =

Argentine weightlifter

Personal information
- Full name: Hugh Juan Vallarino
- Born: 27 March 1916; Buenos Aires, Argentina

Sport
- Sport: Weightlifting

Hugo Vallarino (born 27 March 1916, date of death unknown) was an Argentine weightlifter. He competed in the men's heavyweight event at the 1948 Summer Olympics.
