= Ángel Zucchi =

Argentine field hockey player (born c. 1924)

Ángel Angel Zucchi (born c. 1924) is a field hockey player who competed for Argentina at the 1948 Summer Olympics, he played in all three group games.
