= Jay Lambert =

American boxer (1925–2012)

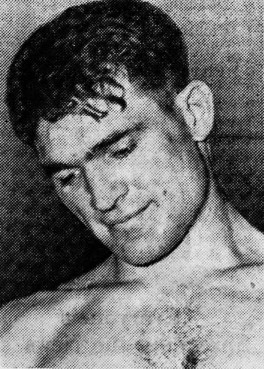
- Lambert, circa 1949

Personal information
- Born: Elbert Jay Lambert; November 21, 1925 Helper, Utah, U.S.
- Died: February 6, 2012 (aged 86) Salt Lake City, Utah, U.S.
- Education: Lehi High School
- Height: 1.63 m (5 ft 4 in)
- Weight: 84 kg (185 lb)

Sport
- Sport: Boxing
- Weight class: Heavyweight
- University team: University of Utah Utes
- Club: West Jordan Boxing Club
- Coached by: Marv Jenson
Medal record
Representing the United States
Olympic Games

Jay Lambert
Boxing career
- Weight class: Heavyweight

Boxing record
- Total fights: 12
- Wins: 8
- Win by KO: 4
- Losses: 3
- Draws: 1

Jay Lambert

Personal details
- Resting place: Wasatch Memorial Lawn
- Spouse: Ila Lamoreaux (m. 1950; died 1994)
- Children: 4 (3 daughters, 1 son)

Military service
- Allegiance: United States
- Branch/service: United States Army Air Forces
- Years of service: 1943–1945
- Rank: Aviation Cadet

Elbert Jay Lambert (November 21, 1925 – February 6, 2012) was an American amateur and professional boxer, medical doctor and general surgeon in Salt Lake City, Utah. He was the 1948 U.S. Olympic Trials Champion and represented the United States as a heavy weight in the 1948 Summer Olympics in London, England. He fought professionally from 1948 to 1950 before leaving the sport to pursue a career in medicine.

== Early life ==
Lambert was born on November 21, 1925, to Aleta Elvera (Vera) Rasmussen and Joseph Hovey Lambert in the small town of Helper, Utah. He had five siblings: brothers Joseph (1919), Tony (1921), and Clyde (1924), and sisters Marian (1917) and Martha (1931). In 1932 the family moved from Helper to the Point of the Mountain near Lehi, Utah where they opened and operated a filling station/diner and pig farm. His older brothers were involved in boxing at a local boxing club and Jay and his oldest brother Joe became part of a boxing training camp operated by Marv Jensen, legendary trainer of Utah boxing legend Gene Fullmer, in West Jordan, Utah. He graduated from Lehi High school in the spring of 1944.

== Amateur Boxing career ==
Prior to joining Marv Jensen's camp, Lambert won the Intermountain Amateur Athletic Union (AAU) tournament middle weight division in 1941 and heavy weight division in 1942. He went on to win the Intermountain AAU Championship in 1943; and he was a two time Intermountain Intercollegiate champ and Intermountain AAU title holder. In 1947, he won the Intermountain Golden Glove Heavy Weight championship and the Intermountain Intercollegiate Heavy Weight championship and was given the Outstanding Boxer award. In 1948, he won the Intermountain AAU title.

== Olympics ==
In 1948, at the age of 22, Lambert won the U.S. Boxing Olympic Trials in the Boston Garden, Boston, Massachusetts securing a spot on the 1948 U.S. Olympic Team. Through three Olympic Trial tournaments, he notched notable victories over Rex Layne, who would later go on to fight Rocky Marciano, Ezzard Charles, and Jersey Joe Walcott, as a top professional heavyweight contender in the 1950s, and Norvel Lee in the tournament's final; Lee would go on to win a gold medal as a light heavyweight in the 1952 Helsinki Olympics. In London, he fought his way to the quarterfinals before losing a split decision to Johnny Arthur of South Africa.

== Professional Boxing career ==
Lambert turned professional in the wake of the Olympics and compiled an 8-3-1 professional record as well as an exhibition match with Joe Louis in 1949. Still considered a contender in the spring of 1950, he left the sport to attend medical school, using his professional boxing earnings to support his medical education.

== Military service ==
Lambert served in the United States Army Air Forces as an aviation cadet during World War II and was stationed in the United States.

== Medical career after boxing ==
Lambert graduated from the University of Utah Medical School in 1954, beginning his general surgery residency at Sloan-Kettering Memorial Center in New York and finishing at LDS Hospital in Salt Lake City. He joined the staff of LDS Hospital in 1959 as a general surgeon. He continued to practice medicine in Salt Lake City until retiring in 1997.

Dr. Lambert remained active in the local boxing community throughout his life donating his services for over 40 years as the ringside physician for the Golden Gloves Amateur Boxing in Utah and as the team physician for Granite High School football in the 70's and 80's.

== Later years ==
Lambert was inducted into the Utah Sport Hall of Fame in 1977.

== Personal life and death ==
Lambert was a member of the Church of Jesus Christ of Latter-day Saints. He died in Salt Lake City on February 6, 2012, at the age of 86.

== Sources ==
- Bio on Lambert's boxing
- "Utah boxing community mourns death of boxer, physician Jay Lambert". The Salt Lake Tribune
- 2009 Deseret Morning News Church Almanac (Salt Lake City, Utah: Deseret Morning News, 2008), p. 326.
- South Valley School article on Jenson
