= Taljard =

Taljard is a South African surname. Notable people with the surname include:

- Dion Taljard (born 1970), South African cricketer
- Jeff Taljard (born 1987), South African rugby union player
- Matthew Taljard (born 1985), South African rugby union player, brother of Jeff
