= Leopoldo Briola =

Argentine weightlifter

Personal information
- Full name: Leopoldo Alberto Briola
- Born: 23 December 1918 Buenos Aires, Argentina

Sport
- Sport: Weightlifting

Leopoldo Briola (born 23 December 1918, date of death unknown) was an Argentine weightlifter. He competed in the men's heavyweight event at the 1948 Summer Olympics.
