= León Martinetti =

Argentine basketball player

Personal information
- Nickname: Tano
- Nationality: Argentine
- Born: July 31, 1926
- Died: December 15, 1999 (aged 73)

Sport
- Sport: Basketball

León Martinetti (July 31, 1926 – December 15, 1999) was an Argentine basketball player who competed in the 1948 Summer Olympics when they finished 15th.
