= Carlos Mercali =

Argentine field hockey player (1921–1976)

Carlos Mercali (1921 – 10 June 1976) is a field hockey player who competed for Argentina at the 1948 Summer Olympics, he played in all three group games. He died on 10 June 1976.
