= Luis Scally =

Argentine hockey player

Personal information
- Born: 26 June 1915 Buenos Aires, Argentina
- Died: 8 July 1994 (aged 79) Buenos Aires, Argentina

Sport
- Sport: Field hockey

Luis Scally (26 June 1915 – 8 July 1994) was an Argentine field hockey player. He competed in the men's tournament at the 1948 Summer Olympics.
