= Nélida Fullone =

Argentine fencer (born 1915)

Personal information
- Born: 27 January 1915

Sport
- Sport: Fencing

Nélida Fullone (born 27 January 1915, date of death unknown) was an Argentine fencer. She competed in the women's individual foil event at the 1948 Summer Olympics.
