= Pearce Wright =

- Born: 23 February 1933; Plymouth
- Died: 6 May 2005 (aged 72)
- Education: Bedford School
- Occupation: Science journalist
- Employer: The Times

Pearce Wright (1933–2005), was a prominent British science journalist who became science editor of The Times.

== Biography ==
Pearce Wright was born in Plymouth on 23 February 1933 and educated at Bedford School before training as a radiologist. He was a journalist with Electronics Weekly, between 1960 and 1966, and joined the Times in 1966 as a technology reporter. He was science editor of the Times from 1974 to 1990. His big, early stories included the Torrey Canyon oil spill, off the Isles of Scilly in 1967, and the Space Race. He was chairman of the Association of British Science Writers.

Described by the Financial Times as one of the "three giants" of science journalism in his era, Wright died on 6 May 2005.
