= Roberto Anderson =

Argentinian field hockey player

Roberto Anderson (1921 – 5 March 1974) was a field hockey player who competed for Argentina at the 1948 Summer Olympics, he played in all three group games, scoring one goal against Spain.
