= Rafael Lledó =

Argentine basketball player (1922–1991)

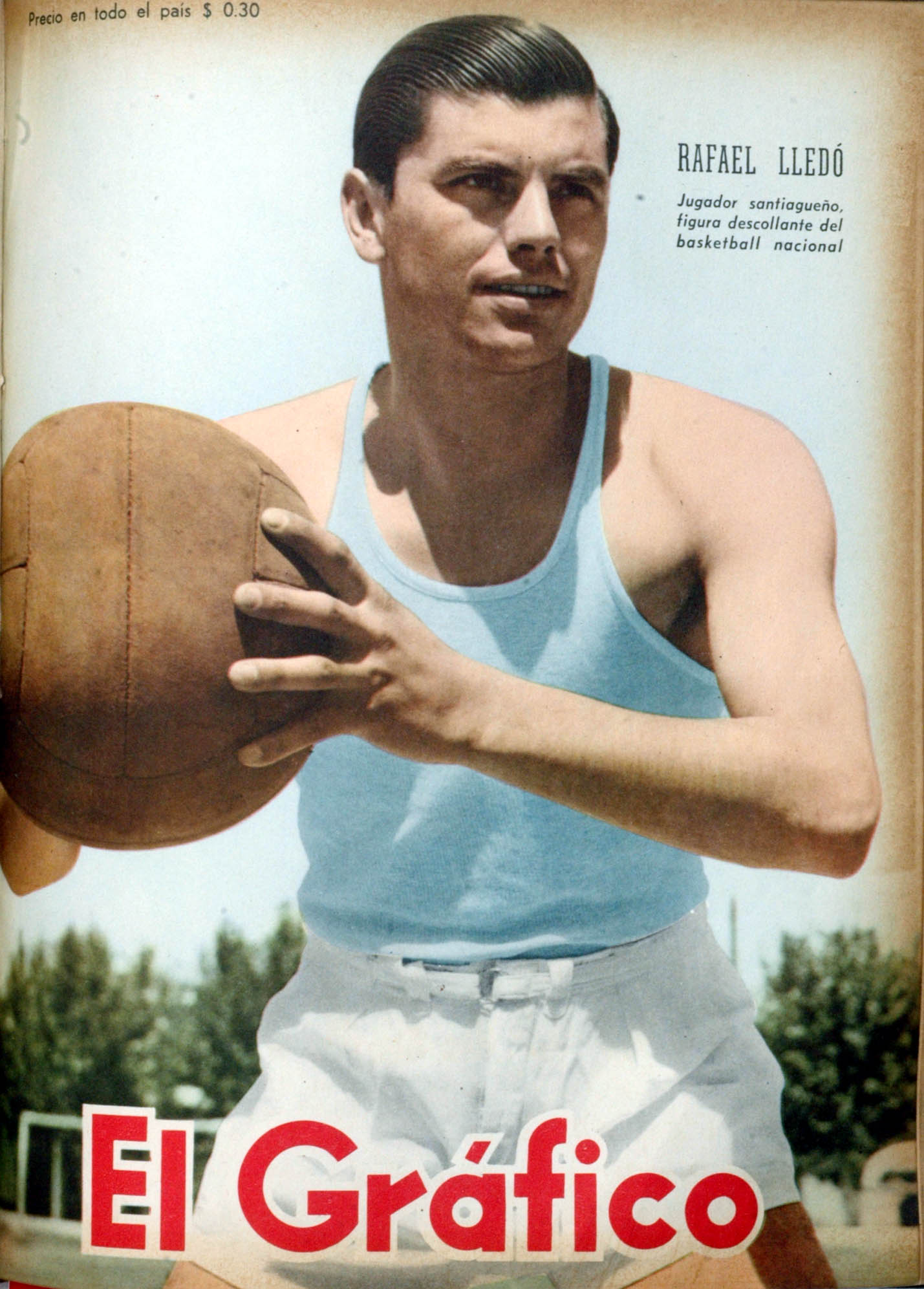

Rafael Lledó (2 March 1922 – 9 August 1991) was an Argentine basketball player who competed in the 1948 Summer Olympics and in the 1952 Summer Olympics. Lledó was born in Santiago del Estero on 2 March 1922. died on 9 August 1991, at the age of 69.
