= Pedro Towers =

Argentine rower

Personal information
- Born: 28 March 1921; Buenos Aires, Argentina
- Died: 23 August 1983 (aged 62)

Sport
- Sport: Rowing

Pedro Towers (28 March 1921 – 23 August 1983) was an Argentine rower. He competed in the men's coxed pair event at the 1948 Summer Olympics.
