= José Arturo Rubio =

Spanish boxer (1924–1992)

Personal information
- Full name: José Arturo Rubio Fernández
- Nationality: Spanish
- Born: 11 April 1924 Pamplona, Spain
- Died: 12 August 1992 (aged 68) Zaragoza, Spain

Sport
- Sport: Boxing

José Arturo Rubio Fernández (11 April 1924 – 12 August 1992) was a Spanish boxer. He competed in the men's heavyweight event at the 1948 Summer Olympics. Rubio died in Zaragoza on 12 August 1992, at the age of 68.
