= Rafael Iglesias (boxer) =

Argentine boxer (1924–1999)

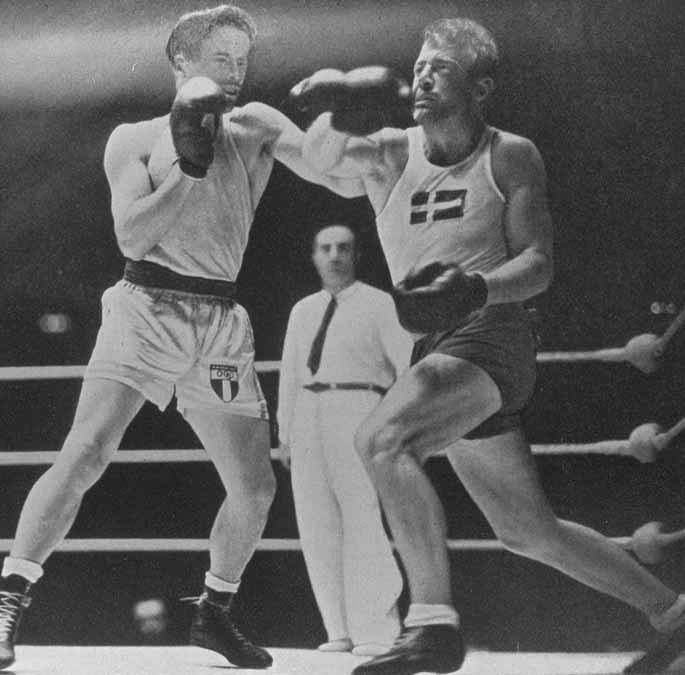
- Iglesias (left) vs. Gunnar Nilsson in the 1948 Olympic final

Personal information
- Full name: Argentino Rafael Iglesias
- Born: 25 May 1924 Avellaneda, Argentina
- Died: 1 January 1999 (aged 74) San Juan, Argentina

Sport
- Sport: Boxing
Medal record
Representing Argentina
Olympic Games
Gold medal – first place	1948 London	Heavyweight

Argentino Rafael Iglesias (25 May 1924 – 1 January 1999) was an Argentine heavyweight boxer. He won a gold medal at the 1948 Summer Olympics in London, England by knocking out Gunnar Nilsson in the final. Iglesias was knocked out himself in his only bout as a professional, in 1952.

== Olympic Boxing Results ==
Rafael Iglesias' results from the heavyweight division at the 1948 Olympic boxing tournament in London:

- Round of 16: defeated Jose Arturo Rubio of Spain by decision
- Quarterfinal: defeated Uber Baccilieri of Italy by decision
- Semifinal: defeated John Arthur of South Africa by decision
- Final: defeated Gunnar Nilsson of Sweden by a second-round knockout
