= Ricardo Adolfo =

Filipino boxer (1917–2005)

Personal information
- Nationality: Filipino
- Born: 1917 Manila, Philippine Islands
- Died: May 25, 2005 (aged 88) Manila, Philippines

Sport
- Sport: Boxing

Ricardo Adolfo (1917 – May 25, 2005) was a Filipino boxer. He competed in the 1948 Summer Olympics.

After his retirement from being a boxer, Adolfo served as head coach of the amateur boxing team of the Adamson University which he mentored from 1969 to 1974. He also worked as a police officer in Manila. He died on May 25, 2005, in his residence in Blumentritt, Manila

== 1948 Olympic results ==
Below is the record of Ricardo Adolfo, a Filipino flyweight boxer who competed at the 1948 London Olympics:

- Round of 32: lost to Pascual Perez (Argentina) by second-round knockout
