= Manuel Guerrero (basketball) =

Argentine basketball player (born c. 1911)

Personal information
- Nationality: Argentine
- Born: c. 1911

Sport
- Sport: Basketball

Manuel Guerrero (born c. 1911, date of death unknown) was an Argentine basketball player who competed in the 1948 Summer Olympics when they finished 15th.
