= Oscar Goulú =

Argentine equestrian

Personal information
- Nationality: Argentine
- Born: 4 September 1912
- Died: 12 May 1976 (aged 63)

Sport
- Sport: Equestrian

Oscar Goulú (4 September 1912 – 12 May 1976) was an Argentine equestrian. He competed in two events at the 1948 Summer Olympics.
