= Augusto Premoli =

Argentine modern pentathlete

Personal information
- Full name: Luis Máximo Premoli
- Born: 29 November 1925 Argentina
- Died: 16 November 2018 (aged 92) Buenos Aires, Argentina

Sport
- Sport: Modern pentathlon

Luis Máximo "Augusto" Premoli (29 November 1925 – 16 November 2018) was an Argentine modern pentathlete. He competed at the 1948 Summer Olympics.
