= Justo Iturralde =

Argentine equestrian (1905–1981)

Personal information
- Nationality: Argentine
- Born: 20 December 1905
- Died: 27 October 1981 (aged 75)

Sport
- Sport: Equestrian
Medal record
Equestrian
Representing Argentina
Pan American Games
| Silver medal – second place | 1951 Buenos Aires | Team dressage |
| Bronze medal – third place | 1951 Buenos Aires | Individual dressage |

Justo J. Iturralde (20 December 1905 – 27 October 1981) was an Argentine equestrian. He competed in two events at the 1948 Summer Olympics.
