= Rafael Campos (equestrian) =

Argentine equestrian

Personal information
- Born: 4 November 1911 Córdoba, Argentina
- Died: 14 December 1968 (aged 57) Buenos Aires, Argentina

Sport
- Sport: Equestrian
Medal record
Equestrian
Representing Argentina
Pan American Games
Silver medal – second place	1951 Buenos Aires	Team jumping

Rafael Campos (4 November 1911 – 14 December 1968) was an Argentine equestrian. He competed in two events at the 1948 Summer Olympics.
