= Humberto Terzano =

Argentine equestrian

Personal information
- Nationality: Argentine
- Born: January 25, 1911
- Died: December 17, 1974 (aged 63)

Sport
- Sport: Equestrian
Medal record
Equestrian
Representing Argentina
Pan American Games
Silver medal – second place	1951 Buenos Aires	Team dressage

Humberto Terzano (January 25, 1911 - December 17, 1974) was an Argentine equestrian. He competed in two events at the 1948 Summer Olympics.
