= Gunnar Nilsson (boxer) =

Swedish boxer

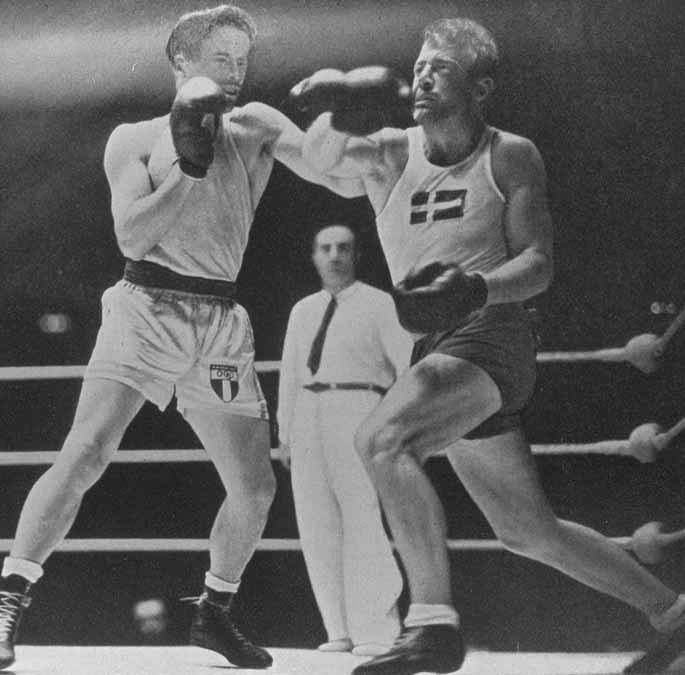
- Rafael Iglesias vs. Gunnar Nilsson in the 1948 Olympic final

Personal information
- Born: 3 March 1923 Grevie, Sweden
- Died: 12 May 2005 (aged 82) Västra Frölunda, Sweden

Sport
- Sport: Boxing
- Club: Redbergslids Boxningsklubb
Medal record
Representing Sweden
Olympic Games
Silver medal – second place	1948 London	Heavyweight

Nils Gunnar Lorentz Nilsson (3 March 1923 – 12 May 2005) was a Swedish heavyweight boxer who won a silver medal at the 1948 Summer Olympics. After the Olympics he turned professional and had a record of 12 wins, 4 losses and 2 draws before retiring in 1956.

== 1948 Olympic results ==
Below is the record of Gunnar Nilsson at the 1948 London Olympics:

- Round of 16: defeated Mohammad Jamshidabads (Iran) by disqualification in the second round
- Quarterfinal: defeated Adam Faul (Canada) on points
- Semifinal: defeated Hans Muller (Switzerland) on points
- Final: lost to Rafael Iglesias (Argentina) by second-round knockout (was awarded silver medal)
