= Ucko =

Ucko is a surname. Notable people with the surname include:

- Felix Ucko (1919–1996), American field hockey player
- Hans Ucko (born 1946), Swedish priest
- Kurt Ucko (1921–2018), American field hockey player
- Peter Ucko (1938–2007), English archaeologist
