= Bangalore Initiative for Religious Dialogue =

- Formation: 2001
- Location: Bangalore
- Coordinates: 13.002232°N 77.623899°E
- Region served: India
- Chairman & Coordinator: P.N. Benjamin
- Website: birdindia.org

The Bangalore Initiative for Religious Dialogue (BIRD) is an organisation based in Bangalore, India that promotes dialog between people of different faiths, attempting to defuse tensions between religious communities such as Hindus, Christians and Muslims.

== Organisation ==
BIRD was established in 2001. The founder, trustee, chairman and coordinator is P.N. Benjamin. Another founding member was Fr. Mathew Chandrankunnel, a professor of Philosophy of Science and Registrar and Director of the Centre for the Study of world Religions at the Dharmaram Vidya Kshetram, Bangalore. BIRD is supported entirely through donations from well-wishers. These are not income tax exempt.

== Public statements ==
The BIRD coordinator P.M. Benjamin is often quoted as an opponent of activism among Christians. After an attack on a Mysore church in February 2002 a team from BIRD and from the Rashtriya Swayamsevak Sangh visited to ascertain what had happened. The BIRD team was led by P.N. Benjamin, who called for calm among Christians, saying "the need of the hour is to unitedly follow Christ's prayer amidst his agony on the cross — forgive them for they know not what they do ... Christians must learn to talk to their enemies for overcoming their sense of alienation and insecurity and halt the march of misunderstanding between communities".

P. N. Benjamin was cited in the 2003 report A Factual Response to the Hate Attack on the India Development and Relief Fund (IDRF) by Ramesh Nagaraj Rao, Narayanan Komerath and others. According to this report, Benjamin had said that Catholic and Protestant organisations had received far more money from abroad than Hindu and Muslim organisations combined, "especially the fundamentalist, and born-again Christian organisations that spread hatred against Hinduism ... Hindu-baiters are making a mountain out of a molehill while they themselves thrive under the shade of foreign funds". He was also quoted as saying "the biased Indian English media has always suppressed facts and encouraged the enemies of the country who received millions of foreign funds to tarnish the nation’s image everywhere by giving wide publicity to the so-called Global Council of Indian Christians and other vested interests.

In September 2005 the website "christianaggression.org" published an article titled "When Intolerance Begets the Loss of Reason" that apparently had been published in the Vijay Times on 9 September 2005, written by P. N. Benjamin. John Dayal, president of the All India Catholic Union and a member of the National Integration Council, had accused Hindu political organisations of atrocities such as raping nuns and murdering priests. The author said that Dayal "opens his mouth and wields his pen only to spew venom on the Hindu community". He said that most attacks on Christians were due to aggressive evangelising. In February 2012 P.N. Benjamin dismissed claims that the 2008 attacks on Christians in southern Karnataka numbered over a thousand. He said "It is just an exaggeration. I feel there have been a handful of attacks, which were instigated by some fringe Christian groups". He said these groups received funding from American Pentecostal churches.

A group of Indian Christians issued a letter on 1 January 2007 to various world leaders entitled A Campaign Declaration: Bangalore Initiative for Religious Dialogue (BIRD). In it they asserted that the 1977 ruling by India's Supreme Court that a citizen had the right to "profess, practice and propagate" ones religion does not include the right to convert another. The group called for a change to Article 18 the Universal Declaration of Human Rights to prohibit conversion through material incentives, coercion, threats or intimidation. However, the BIRD members affirmed the Great Commission that "unequivocally calls us to witness to Christ in a pluralistic setting".

== Stanley Samartha memorial lectures ==
The BIRD runs inter-faith seminars and discussion sessions, and arranges annual lectures in memory of the theologian Stanley Jedidiah Samartha. Dr. Samartha once called himself a Hindu by culture, Christian by faith, Indian by citizenship and ecumenical by choice. Speakers at these lectures have included:

- François Gautier (2001) The need for inter-religious dialogue
- C.T. Kurien, economist and Director Emeritus of Madras Institute of Development Studies (2003) Communal harmony – A societal perspective
- M.V. Nadkarni, former Vice Chancellor of Gulbarga University (2004) Religion in 21st century – A perspective of hope
- Mar Thoma Metropolitan Bishop Philipose Mar Chrysostom (2005) Courage for dialogue
- Hans Ucko, director of inter-faith dialogue division at the World Council of Churches (2006) Towards an ethical code of conduct for conversion
- K.T. Thomas, former Judge of Supreme Court of India (2007) Right to convert and the Indian constitution
- M. J. Akbar, journalist and author and editor of India Today (2008) The Power of Religion vs. the Religion of Power
- Arun Shourie, journalist and author (2009) Rethinking Religions

On 7 October 2010 Sir Mark Tully, former chief of BBC India, spoke on How certain should we be? The problem of religious pluralism to an audience of over 350. Sir Mark, who had spent over thirty years in India, spoke of his experiences and of the fact that India had historically been home to all the world's major religions. He said that had taught him that there are many ways to God. The American Hindu author David Frawley delivered the tenth Dr Stanley Samartha Memorial lecture in March 2012, speaking on "Pluralism and Universalism in Hinduism".
