= Ecumenical Christian Centre =

Religious centre for ecumenical relations in Bengaluru, India

- ECC
- Motto: For the unity of humankind
- Type: Centre for fostering ecumenical relations. (A Section 25 Company incorporated under the Companies Act 1956)
- Established: 1963; 63 years ago
- President: Rt Rev Isaac Mar Philoxenos
- Director: Prof Fr Mathew Chandrankunnel CMI
- Location: Bengaluru, Karnataka, India; 12°58′30″N 77°44′20″E
- Campus: Semi-urban
- Website: www.eccbangalore.org

Ecumenical Christian Centre (ECC) was founded in 1963 by M. A. Thomas. ECC is located in Whitefield in Bengaluru on a 29-acre (120,000 m^{2}) campus.

== Background ==
The Ecumenical Christian Centre (ECC) was established in 1963 by M. A. Thomas with the vision to promote "unity among all humankind and creation". ECC mainly concentrates on social concerns to encourage harmonious living and peaceful coexistence of people who belong to different faiths and ideologies.

Over the past couple of decades there has been surge in demand for conducting renowned international and national conferences, seminars and symposiums at ECC.

== Legal status ==
ECC is a body corporate registered under the Companies Act 1956 and was incorporated on 25 February 1966 as a company not for profit and falls under the purview of the Registrar of Companies, Karnataka region.

== Activities and programmes ==
The Ecumenical Christian Centre concentrates on social concerns to encourage harmonious living and peaceful coexistence of people who belong to various faiths and ideologies. Conferences, seminars and consultations on topics with contemporary relevance such as development education, conflict resolution, communication, human rights, ecology and faith, peace and reconciliation and concerns of the disabled and sexual minority are held all round the years.

=== Indian School of Ecumenical Theology (ISET) ===
The Indian School of Ecumenical Theology (ISET), a programme wing at ECC, was established in 1988 as a unit of ECC in order to give a theological basis through the wide-ranging programmes. The general objective of ISET is "to evolve and share a Common Faith Vision as a sign of our commitment to the Reign of God and our Journey in Solidarity with Cosmic Community towards its fulfilment. ISET organizes regional institutes in collaboration with other centers and organizations in different linguistic areas for imparting wider ecumenical concerns in fulfilling the mission of God.

This ecumenical vision involves three major thrusts: inter-church, inter-religious and cosmic which together constitute the total ecumenical process."

Keeping the above objectives in mind, the ISET aims at:

- Taking the total context of the world as "the text" and "the context" of theologizing:
- Involving all churches and the human community in the process of theologizing:
- Discovering and promoting the rich diversity and heritage of all Christians and religious traditions; and
- Fostering unity of humankind and all creation by analyzing the divisive and destructive forces at work in the world, by exposing their root causes and proposing ways of healing and reconciliation and peace with justice.

=== Bangalore Inter-Theologate Seminar (BITS) ===
ECC provides an opportunity for teachers and students from 23 Bangalore-based seminaries affiliated to the Catholic Church, Senate of Serampore University, the Asia Theological Association and other affiliations to enrich ecumenical discourse in a wider perspective.

=== International Institute of Horticulture Management (IIHM) ===
In 2008 ECC initiated International Institute of Horticulture Management (IIHM) at its campus in Whitefield, Bangalore. IIHM is a manifestation of ECC's commitment to ecology and the preservation of planet Earth. It also aims at educating young students in scientific management of horticulture crops and thereby increase production manifold. This training programme is organized at a time when the Nation has set a target of doubling its horticultural production within the next 10 years.

IIHM offers short intensive horticulture management courses both theoretical and practical. The courses specifically address the following areas:

- Technology related to growing fruits and vegetables
- Vegetable gardening
- Element of floriculture and cut flowers
- Gardening – Indoor and outdoor
- Medicinal and aromatic plants
- Spice crops
- Commercial crops
- Application of biotechnology in horticulture
- Irrigation and fertigation technology
- Protected cultivation of vegetables and flowers (greenhouse)
- Machinery for horticultural production
- Contract farming and linkages
- Dry land crops and management
- Sericulture and economics
- Management of successful farms
- Financing by NABARD and banks

Lecture classes are followed by field visits both within the campus and to premium farms/plantations. The course is residential and each batch of the course will have an intake of 30 participants.

=== ECC Neighbourhood Interactive Forum ===
The ECC Neighbourhood Interactive Forum (ENIF) was initiated in 2007 to create a platform for the residents in the neighbourhood of the ECC to come together periodically for mutual fellowship and interaction. It provides an opportunity to discuss issues of common concern in the neighbourhood and to explore and implement need-based community development programmes in the neighbourhood. All residents Associations in Whitefield come together in ECC and get involved with the vision of the centre.

=== Balwadi ===
ECC initiated a Balwadi in 1978 in the neighbouring village at Nellurahalli. The school now has 50 children. It works from Monday to Saturday from 8.30 a.m. to 3.0 p.m. Storytelling, teaching songs, alphabets and numerals, games, are the main activities. Regular parent-teacher discussions are arranged to educate the parents of their responsibility in moulding the future of the young children. The school has the contact between the people of the village and the ECC. This programme has been well accepted in the respective communities.

The main objective of the Balwadi is to enable the children of the migrant workers in and around Nallurahalli village to get an opportunity to go to school; to enable poor children of the Nallurahalli village to secure the benefit of education; to inculcate values of life and principles of hygiene in young minds: to strengthen the Community Development programmes through medical camps, educational programmes; awareness creation programmes, etc.

== Journal ==
- Theology for Our Times
- ECC news

== Administration ==
=== Executive committee ===
The present executive committee comprises the following elected members:

- Chairperson – Theodosius Mar Thoma Metropolitan
- Vice-chairperson – Sarasu Esther Thomas
- Treasurer – Shri M. O. Geevarghese
- Members:
  - Cyril Mar Baselios Metropolitan
  - Commissioner John Kumar Dasari
  - Noah Vasanthakumar
  - Sham P. Thomas, Director/Secretary

=== Director ===
The present incumbent from January 2022 is Sham P. Thomas who is an ordained Priest of the Malankara Mar Thoma Syrian Church and a Vicar General of the Church. He was Professor and Chairperson of the Department of Communication at the United Theological College Bangalore. He presently serves as the Vice-Master of the Serampore College (University). He was the James S. Stewart Scholar at the University of Edinburgh, Scotland.
