= Mark Tully =

British-Indian journalist (1935–2026)

Sir Mark Tully KBE
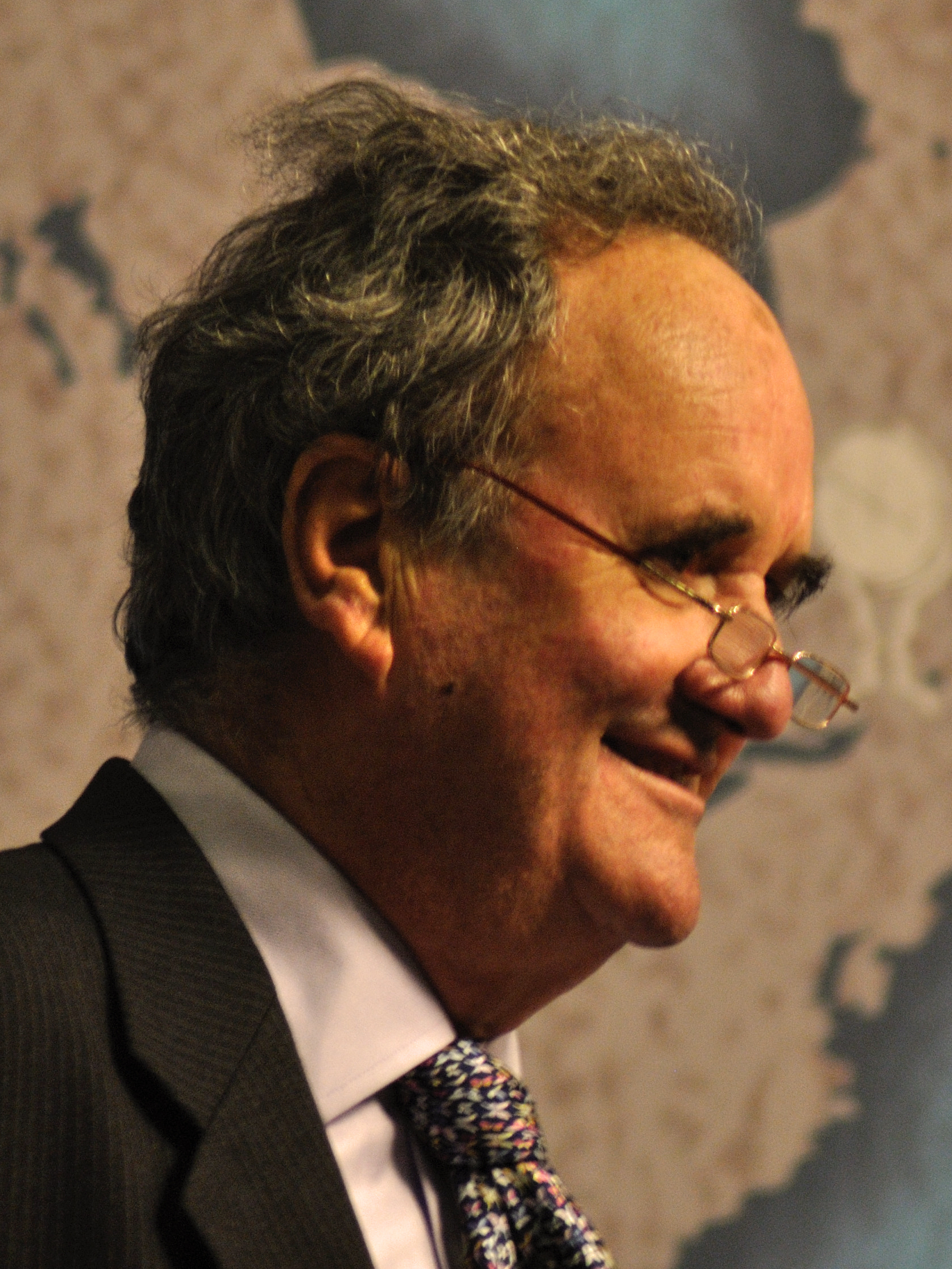
- Tully in 2011
- Born: William Mark Tully; 24 October 1935; Tollygunge, Calcutta, Bengal Presidency, British India
- Died: 25 January 2026 (aged 90); New Delhi, India
- Education: Marlborough College; Trinity Hall, Cambridge
- Occupations: Journalist; writer
- Children: 4

Signature
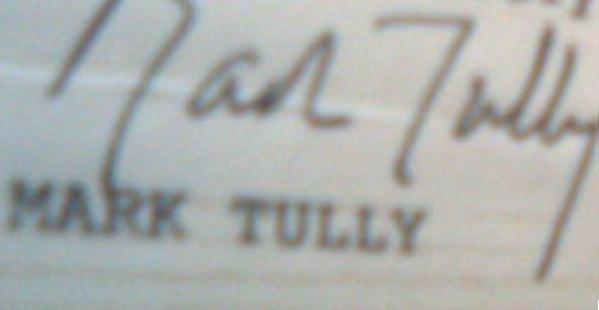

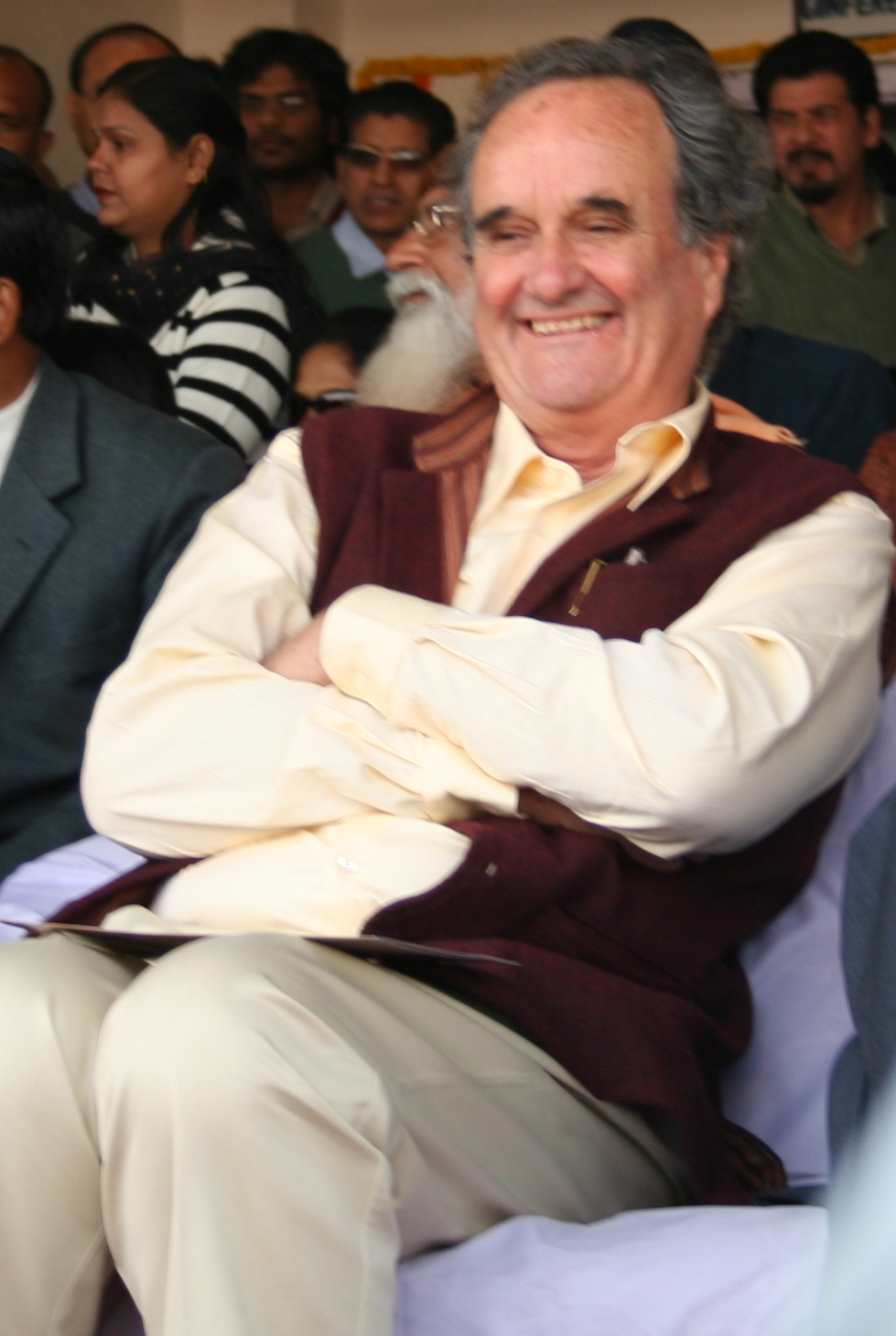
Tully at a function in Delhi in 2007

Sir William Mark Tully (24 October 1935 – 25 January 2026) was a British journalist and the bureau chief of the BBC in New Delhi, a position he held for 20 years. He worked with the BBC for 30 years before resigning in July 1994. He also wrote and published several books.

== Early life and education ==
Tully was born in Tollygunge, Calcutta, Bengal Presidency, British India, on 24 October 1935. His father was a British businessman who was a partner in one of the leading managing agencies of the British Raj. His mother had been born in Bengal. Tully spent the first decade of his childhood in India, although without being allowed to socialise with Indian people. His British nanny once scolded him for learning to count in Hindi from his driver, saying "that's the servant's language, not yours". At the age of four, he was sent to a "British boarding school" in Darjeeling, before going to England for further schooling from the age of nine. There he was educated at Twyford School (Hampshire), Marlborough College and at Trinity Hall, Cambridge, where he studied Theology.

After Cambridge, Tully intended to become a priest in the Church of England but abandoned this after two terms at Lincoln Theological College, admitting later that he had doubts about "trusting [his] sexuality to behave as a Christian priest".

== Journalistic career ==
Tully joined the BBC in 1964 and moved back to India in 1965 to work as the corporation's India correspondent. He covered all the major incidents in South Asia during his tenure, ranging from Indo-Pakistan conflicts, Bhopal gas tragedy, Operation Blue Star (and the subsequent assassination of Indira Gandhi, anti-Sikh riots), the assassination of Rajiv Gandhi to the demolition of Babri Masjid. He was expelled from India shortly after Indira Gandhi declared a state of emergency and began ruling by decree in 1975; he returned a year and a half later shortly before the restoration of normality in the country.

In 1992, when covering the demolition of the Babri Masjid by Hindutva activists, some of the perpetrators confronted him, chanting "Death to Mark Tully", reflecting their distrust of the BBC. Tully was locked in a room until a local official and a Hindu priest helped him leave several hours later; he later said that the demolition was India's "greatest setback" to secularism as an independent nation. He resigned from the BBC in July 1994 after an argument with John Birt, the then director general. He accused Birt of "running the corporation by fear" and "turning the BBC into a secretive monolith with poor ratings and a demoralised staff".

In 1994 he presented an episode of BBC's Great Railway Journeys, "Karachi to The Khyber Pass", travelling by train across Pakistan. A well-known railway enthusiast, he also presented "Steam's Indian Summer", a documentary produced by Nick Lera in his World Steam Classics series. As Tully reports in the journal HIMAL, the two men could not be sure where steam locomotives were still operating and they travelled around India together locating and filming them.

From 1994, he worked as a freelance journalist and broadcaster based in New Delhi.

He was the regular presenter of the weekly BBC Radio 4 programme Something Understood until the BBC announced its end in 2019.

As a guest of the Bangalore Initiative for Religious Dialogue, on 7 October 2010 he spoke on "How certain should we be? The problem of religious pluralism." He described his experiences and the fact that India had historically been home to all the world's major religions. He said that had taught him that there are many ways to God.

Tully was patron of the British branch of Child in Need India (CINI UK).

Equally well versed in English and Hindi, he contributed his efforts to keep literature alive and was the key speaker among 50 speakers of second Kalinga Literary Festival on 17 May 2015, where he explored the role of literature in nation building.

== Books ==
Tully's first book on India, Amritsar: Mrs Gandhi's Last Battle (1985), was co-authored with his colleague at BBC Delhi, Satish Jacob; the book dealt with the events leading up to Operation Blue Star, Indian military action carried out between 1 and 8 June 1984 to remove militant religious leader Jarnail Singh Bhindranwale and his followers from the buildings of the Harmandir Sahib (Golden Temple) complex in Amritsar, Punjab.

Tully's No Full Stops in India (1991), a collection of ten journalistic essays, was published in the US as The Defeat of a Congress-man. At the end, as an Epilogue, Tully covered the assassination of Rajiv Gandhi theme as well, that included the weakness of Congress Party as a party of sycophants. The Independent wrote that "Tully's profound knowledge and sympathy ... unravels a few of the more bewildering and enchanting mysteries of the subcontinent."

In 2002 came India in Slow Motion, written in collaboration with Gillian Wright and published by Viking. Reviewing the book in The Observer, Michael Holland wrote of Tully that "Few foreigners manage to get under the skin of the world's biggest democracy the way he does, and fewer still can write about it with the clarity and insight he brings to all his work."

The anonymously authored Hindutva Sex and Adventure was a novel featuring a main character with strong similarities to Tully. Tully himself stated that "I am amazed that Roli Books should publish such thinly disguised plagiarism, and allow the author to hide in a cavalier manner behind a nom-de-plume. The book is clearly modelled on my career, even down to the name of the main character. That character's journalism is abysmal, and his views on Hindutva and Hinduism do not in any way reflect mine. I would disagree with them profoundly."

His last book, Upcountry Tales: Once Upon A Time In The Heart Of India (2017), was a collection of short stories set in rural north India.

== Personal life and death ==
In 1960 Tully married Margaret, with whom he had four children during the 1960s. However, after 1981, he lived in Nizamuddin West in Delhi with his girlfriend, Gillian Wright. Tully held an Overseas Citizenship of India card.

Tully died on 25 January 2026 at the age of 90, at a hospital in New Delhi.

He was a member of the Oriental Club in London.

== Awards and honours ==
Tully was made an Officer of the Order of the British Empire in 1985 and was awarded the Padma Shri in 1992. He was knighted in the New Year Honours 2002, receiving a KBE, and in 2005 he received the Padma Bhushan.

== See also ==
- List of Indian writers
