= C. T. Kurien =

Indian economist (1931–2024)

- Born: 2 July 1931; British India
- Died: 23 July 2024 (aged 93); Bengaluru, Karnataka, India
- Other name: CTK
- Citizenship: Indian
- Education: Madras Christian College (1953); Stanford University (PhD)
- Occupations: Economist; eacher
- Known for: Life long work with a deep focus on economics for understanding and eradicating poverty
- Notable work: Wealth and Illfare, Economics of Real Life

Christopher Thomas Kurien (2 July 1931 – 23 July 2024), popularly known as CTK, was an Indian professor of economics based in Bangalore, Karnataka. He wrote many books on economics and was defined as having centre-left politics ideology.

== Early life ==
Born on 2 July 1931, Kurien attended Madras Christian College, graduating in 1953 with a master's degree in economics. He went on to Stanford University, where he was awarded a PhD in 1962.

== Career ==
Returning to Madras Christian College between 1962 and 1978, he was professor and head of the Department of Economics. Kurien was a National Fellow of the University Grants Commission from 1975 to 1977. In 1978, he was appointed director of the Madras Institute of Development Studies, a national centre for social science research, holding this position for ten years. He was a National Fellow of the Indian Council of Social Science Research from 1992 to 1994. He was chairman of the Madras Institute of Development Studies from 1997 to 2003, when he retired from academic work.

Kurien received the University Grants Commission's Lifetime Achievement Award in 1996. He was appointed the first chairman of the Malcolm and Elizabeth Adiseshiah Trust in 1999. He was president of the Indian Economic Association in 2002. In 2003, he delivered the Dr. Stanley Samartha Memorial lecture to the Bangalore Initiative for Religious Dialogue, speaking on the topic: "Communal harmony – A societal perspective". As of 2012 he was a member of the board of the Institute for Social and Economic Change (ISEC) in Karnataka. His most recent book "WEALTH AND ILLFARE — An Expedition into Real Life Economics" was published in 2012, when the author was 80. It provides an accessible overview of economics, but questions the value of an economic system based on the pure pursuit of profit.

== Death ==
Kurien died on 23 July 2024, at the age of 93.

== Bibliography ==
- C. T. Kurien (1966). Our five year plans. Christian Institute for the Study of Religion and Society. p. 199.
- C. T. Kurien (1969). Indian economic crisis: a diagnostic study. Asia Pub. House. p. 123.
- C. T. Kurien (1970). A theoretical approach to the Indian economy. Asia Publishing House. p. 64.
- C. T. Kurien (1974). Poverty and development. Christian Literature Society. p. 209.
- C. T. Kurien (1978). Poverty, planning, and social transformation. Allied. p. 174.
- C. T. Kurien; Josef James (1979). Economic change in Tamil Nadu, 1960–1970: a regionally and functionally disaggregated analysis. Allied. p. 374.
- C. T. Kurien (1981). Mission and Proclamation: The Church in India Today and Other Pieces. Christian Literature Society. p. 116.
- C. T. Kurien (1989). Dynamics of Rural Transformation: A Study of Tamil Nadu, 1950–1980. University of Nevada Press. p. 169. ISBN 086311086X.
- C. T. Kurien; E. R. Prabhakar; Sarvepalli Gopal; Malcolm S. Adiseshiah (1991). Economy, society, and development: essays and reflections in honour of Malcolm S. Adiseshiah. Sage Publications. p. 331. ISBN 0803996985.
- C. T. Kurien (1992). The economy: an interpretive introduction. Sage. p. 436. ISBN 0803994281.
- C. T. Kurien (1992). Growth and justice: aspects of India's development experience. Oxford University Press. p. 295.
- C. T. Kurien (1994). Global capitalism and the Indian economy. Orient Longman. p. 132. ISBN 8125002723.
- C. T. Kurien (1996). Rethinking economics: reflections based on a study of the Indian economy. Sage Publications. p. 272. ISBN 0803993099.
- C. T. Kurien (1996). Economic Reforms and the People. Madhyam Books. p. 84.
- C. T. Kurien (2012). Wealth and Illfare: An Expedition into Real Life Economics. Books for Change. p. 253.
