= Mathew Chandrankunnel =

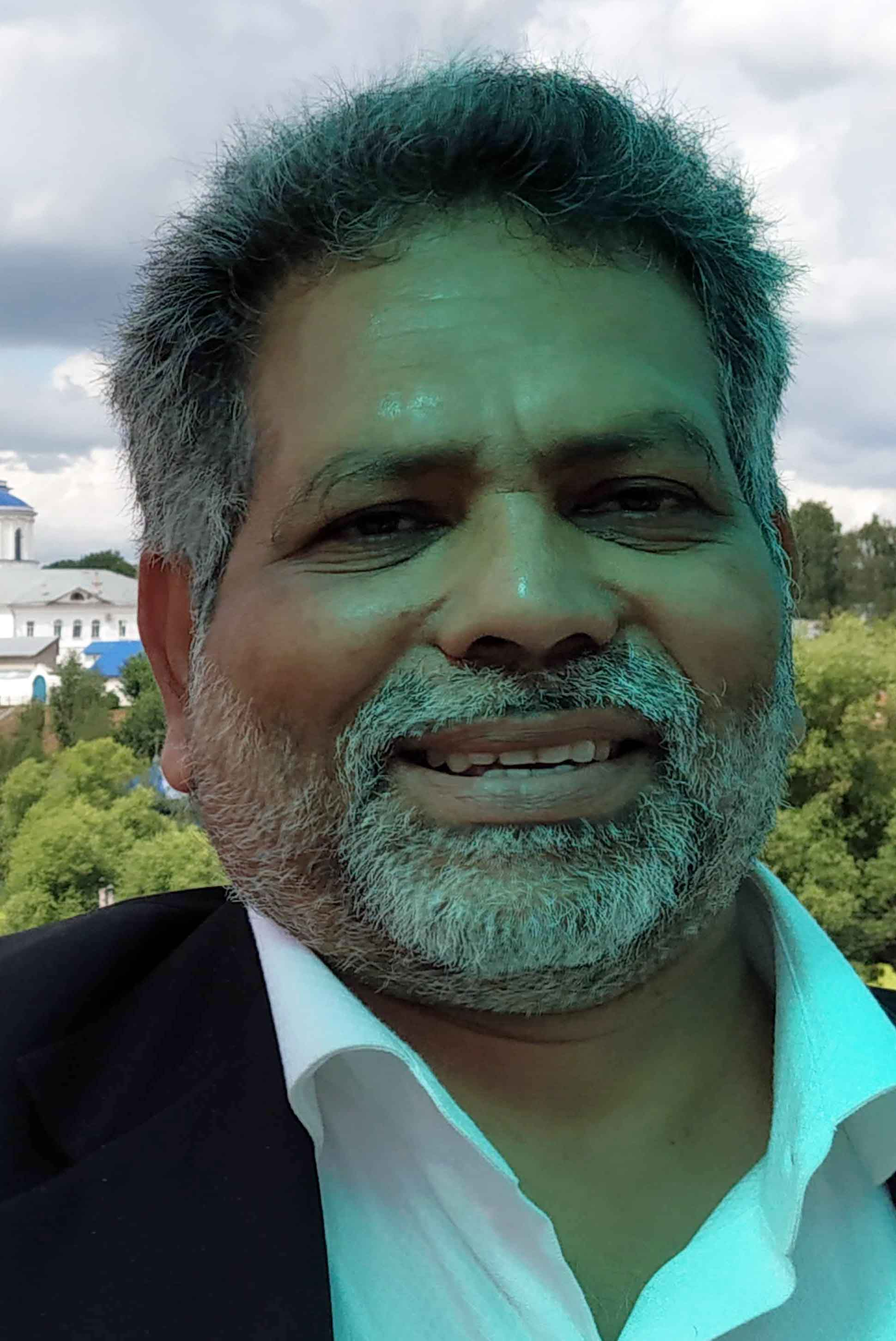
- Born: 26 April 1958 (age 68)
- Occupation: Professor of philosophy of science
- Known for: Philosophy of Quantum mechanics

Mathew Chandrankunnel (born 26 April 1958) is a professor of philosophy of science at Dharmaram Vidya Kshetram and Christ University, both in Bangalore, India. He is the author of several books including "Philosophy of Quantum mechanics" and "Ascent to Truth: The Physics, philosophy and Religion of Galileo Galilei". He is a scientist, philosopher and theologian.

== Birth and Education ==
Prof. Dr. Mathew Chandrankunnel CMI was born on 26 April 1958. He was ordained a priest in the Syro-Malabar Catholic Church on 5 May 1987, and is in the Carmelites of Mary Immaculate Congregation, Province of Kottayam. He went to Telangana in Andhra Pradesh in the early 1990s, living with the Naxalites and trying to understand their movement.

Chandrankunnel studied physics and philosophy in several Indian universities. In 1998 he earned a PhD in Philosophy of Science from the University of Leuven in Belgium. He worked under Aage Bohr, Carl Friedrich von Weizsäcker and Ilya Prigogine in developing his thesis, which compared the interpretations of Niels Bohr and of David Bohm. He did post-doctoral research at the Harvard–Smithsonian Center for Astrophysics, and lectured at the State University of New York. In July 2000 he won the Science and Religion Course Award from the Centre for Theology and Natural Sciences in Berkeley, California for his contribution: "Search for Unity and Interconnectedness: Meeting Point between Science and Religion".

== Later career ==
Chandrankunnel is a founder of the Bangalore Forum for Science and Religion. He was a founding member in 2001 of the Bangalore Initiative for Religious Dialogue, which attempts to defuse tensions between religious communities such as Hindus, Christians and Muslims. He was the Indian co-ordinator for the Science-Religion Summit in Bangalore in 2003. He organised the conference "Merging Boundaries: Mysticism, Science and Religion", inaugurated by Sri Ravi Shankar. He has worked as science editor of Deepika daily newspaper and as its Chennai and Bangalore correspondent.

A group of Indian Christians issued a letter on 1 January 2007 to various world leaders entitled A Campaign Declaration: Bangalore Initiative for Religious Dialogue (BIRD). Chandrankunnel was one of the signatories. The group asserted that the 1977 ruling by India's Supreme Court that a citizen had the right to "profess, practice and propagate" ones religion does not include the right to convert another. The group called for a change to Article 18 of the Universal Declaration of Human Rights to prohibit conversion through material incentives, coercion, threats or intimidation. However, the BIRD members affirmed the Great Commission that "unequivocally calls us to witness to Christ in a pluralistic setting".

Chandrankunnel was visiting professor at the University of Leuven, Faculty of Philosophy in April–May 2010. He lectured on the Physics, Philosophy and Religion of Galileo. In June 2011 he addressed a seminar on "Nation building and minority welfare", saying every citizen had a duty to bring the marginalised towards mainstream society. As of 2012 Chandrankunnel was an associate director of Geothirbhavan – Georgian CMI Centre for Counselling, Training and Transformation. He was also Director-Coordination of the Chaavara Cancer Research Institute. He was a member of the Association of Christian Philosophers of India.

As of 2016 Chandrankunnel was leading annual programs for visiting students from Europe and North America on "Religions in Contemporary India". In these one-month programs the students meet representative of different religions and visit Hindu, Buddhist. Sikh, Jain, Muslim and Christian centres.

On 16 December 2016, Prof. Mathew Chandrankunnel CMI took charge as the Director of Ecumenical Christian Centre and now taking new initiatives to transform and make ECC a centre of excellence, compassion and human unity by connecting it with international centres, bringing international figures to ECC and organizing international conferences along with local, national and Asian level initiatives. He is the first Catholic priest to act as the head of the centre.

== Bibliography ==
- Chandrankunnel, Mathew (1997). In Search of a Causal Quantum Mechanics: A Comparison Between Copenhagen Mechanics and Bohmian Mechanics. Katholoeke Universiteit Leuven. p. 298.
- Chandrankunnel, Mathew (2000). Philosophy of Physics. Anmol Publications. p. 438. ISBN 8126105887.
- Philosophical Methods. Through the Prevalent to the Relevant. Asian Trading Corporation, Bangalore. 2004. ISBN 81-7086-325-2. (Contributor)
- Chandrankunnel, Mathew (2004). The Condemnation and Rehabilitation of Galileo Galilei. Dharmaram. p. 227. ISBN 818686170X.
- Chandrankunnel, Mathew (2008). Philosophy of Quantum Mechanics. Global Vision Publishing. p. 427. ISBN 978-8182202580.
