= Something Understood =

BBC Radio 4 programme

Something Understood was a weekly radio programme broadcast on BBC Radio 4 from 1995 to 2024 which dealt with topics of religion, spirituality, and the larger questions of human life, and took a particular spiritual theme, exploring it through speech, music, prose, and poetry. It was broadcast early on Sunday mornings with a repeat late on Sunday evening. New episodes have not been produced since 2019.

== Arrangement ==
Pieces of music – popular as well as classical – were often used at the beginning and end of the programme. It was hosted regularly by Sir Mark Tully, but also by other contributors. The programme was first broadcast in 1995; the BBC, having announced its cessation earlier in the year, broadcast the last new programme on Easter Sunday 21 April 2019. In 2009, the Archbishop of Canterbury, Rowan Williams, was interviewed on a programme talking about prayer. In February 2013, a special edition of the programme consisted of the Dalai Lama talking about the mind.

The name of the programme is a quotation from George Herbert's 1633 poem "Prayer".
