= Kurt Ucko =

American field hockey player

Kurt Joseph Ucko (August 25, 1921 – July 2, 2018) was an American field hockey player since 1932 who qualified for the 1952 Summer Olympics and competed in the 1956 Summer Olympics, coming from Packanack Lake, New Jersey, with his brother Felix Alfred Ucko, and got 11th place. He also played for the New York Field Hockey Club. He created Ucko Machine Tools, Inc. and the North Jersey Men’s Field Hockey Club. He was born in Frankfurt am Main, Hessen, Germany to American parents and died in South Orange or Maplewood, New Jersey. He was married to Martha Kribben Ucko (1923 – August 9, 2008) for 61 years.
