= Madras Institute of Development Studies =

Research Institute in Chennai, India

- Type: Autonomous, non-profit
- Established: 1971; 55 years ago
- Chairperson: N. Gopalaswami, IAS (Retd.)
- Director: M. Suresh Babu
- Location: Chennai, Tamil Nadu, India
- Campus: Urban
- Website: mids.ac.in

The Madras Institute of Development Studies (MIDS) is a research institute based in Chennai. It is a joint undertaking of the Governments of India and Tamil Nadu for conducting research on development problems in Tamil Nadu and the rest of India.

== History ==
MIDS was established by Malcolm Adiseshiah and his wife Elizabeth Adiseshiah in January 1971. Malcolm Adiseshiah served as its first director. In March 1977, MIDS was reconstituted as a national research institute under the sponsorship of Government of India through the Indian Council of Social Science Research and the Government of Tamil Nadu. The Adiseshiahs donated the land, buildings, furniture, equipment and made cash endowments to the newly constituted institute. Malcolm Adiseshiah resigned as MIDS' director in 1978 and became the chairman and honorary fellow. Professor C.T. Kurien became the next director of MIDS. In 1985, the Reserve Bank of India established a chair for applied research in regional economics, which has since been converted to a fully autonomous unit in 2002.

== Administration ==
MIDS is governed by a governing council and an academic council. The governing council consists of the chairperson, the institute's director as member-secretary, representatives of faculty, the Indian Council of Social Science Research, the Government of Tamil Nadu, and from the universities of the four South Indian states, trustees of the institute, and co-opted social scientists, as members. It ordinarily meets once a year, while its finance committee and executive council meet twice a year. The academic council consists of the director as chairperson, and both external and internal members. All the professors of the institute are its members; other faculty members and the Ph.D. scholars serve on it in rotation. Five reputed social scientists from other universities and institutes are members of the academic council. Each of them serve for three years. The council meets twice a year to review, and provide guidelines on, the academic activities of the institute.

== Academics ==
MIDS' research focuses on subjects like development and planning, centre-state relationship, poverty, inequality, agrarian issues, social movements, caste and communal politics. It offers a full-time doctoral program under three classes - Indian Council of Social Science Research fellowships, RBI fellowships and Malcolm & Elizabeth Adiseshiah Ph.D. Merit Scholarship. It also offers an annual award called "The Malcolm Adiseshiah award" for mid-career academicians in the field of developmental studies. Prominent faculty members of MIDS (both past and present) include Kaushik Basu, A R Venkatachalapathy, Padmini Swaminathan and K. Nagaraj. Its publication cell publishes books and academic papers (sometimes in collaboration with Kalachuvadu Pathippagam, a Tamil publishing house). It also brings out a bi-annual bulletin called "Review of Development and Change".
