= Packanack Lake, New Jersey =

Populated place in Passaic County, New Jersey, US

- Census-designated place
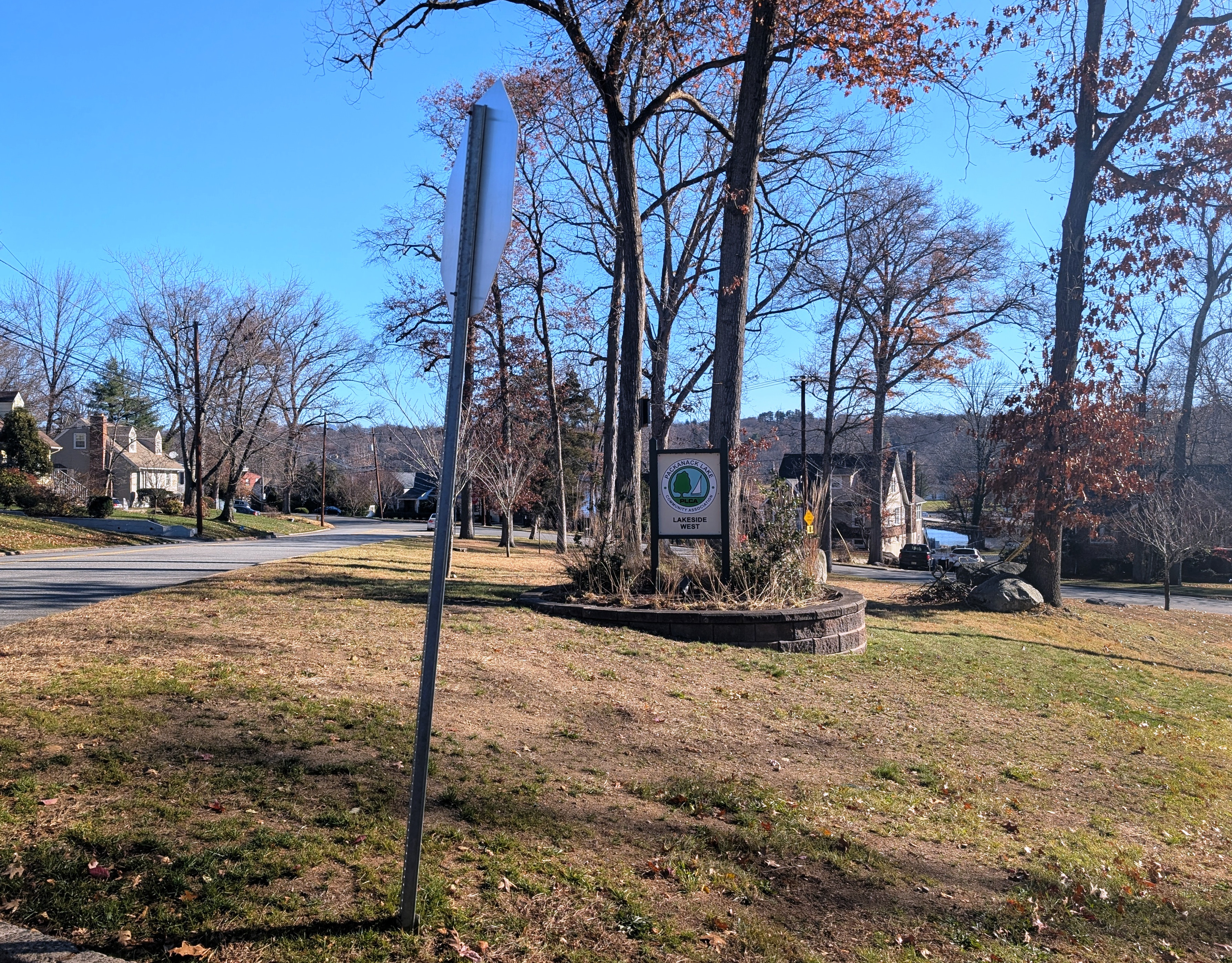
- Sign for the Lakeside West neighborhood in the community

- Location in Passaic County Location in New Jersey Location in the United States
- Coordinates: 40°56′33″N 74°15′23″W
- Country: United States
- State: New Jersey
- County: Passaic
- Township: Wayne

Area
  - Total: 1.99 sq mi (5.16 km^{2})
  - Land: 1.86 sq mi (4.82 km^{2})
  - Water: 0.13 sq mi (0.34 km^{2})
- Elevation: 203 ft (62 m)

Population (2020)
  - Total: 6,261
  - Density: 3,366.1/sq mi (1,299.7/km^{2})
- ZIP Code: 07470
- FIPS code: 34-55620
- GNIS feature ID: 0879082

Packanack Lake is an unincorporated lake community and census-designated place (CDP) in Wayne in Passaic County, in the U.S. state of New Jersey. The community is located 30 minutes northwest of Manhattan. As of the 2020 census, Packanack Lake had a population of 6,261.

The median income in Packanack Lake was $100,887, and the average income of households with children was $140,869. 95.9% of Packanack area residents are high school graduates while 57.5% are college graduates. 77.4% of residents are married. 41.4% of residents had children. The average age of residents was 40.6 years old.

Gatherings and social events are held on both East Beach (on Lake Drive East) and West Beach (on Lake Drive West) which include band concerts, craft shows, and bonfires.

== Demographics ==
Historical population
Census	Pop.	Note	%±
2020	6,261		—
U.S. Decennial Census; 2020

Packanack Lake was first listed as a census designated place in the 2020 U.S. census.

=== 2020 census ===
As of the 2020 census, Packanack Lake had a population of 6,261.

The median age was 42.7 years. 24.3% of residents were under the age of 18 and 17.8% of residents were 65 years of age or older. For every 100 females there were 96.1 males, and for every 100 females age 18 and over there were 95.3 males age 18 and over.

100.0% of residents lived in urban areas, while 0.0% lived in rural areas.

There were 2,093 households in Packanack Lake, of which 39.3% had children under the age of 18 living in them. Of all households, 72.8% were married-couple households, 7.5% were households with a male householder and no spouse or partner present, and 16.4% were households with a female householder and no spouse or partner present. About 13.0% of all households were made up of individuals and 8.8% had someone living alone who was 65 years of age or older.

There were 2,143 housing units, of which 2.3% were vacant. The homeowner vacancy rate was 0.8% and the rental vacancy rate was 6.1%.

Packanack Lake CDP, New Jersey – Racial and ethnic composition Note: the US Census treats Hispanic/Latino as an ethnic category. This table excludes Latinos from the racial categories and assigns them to a separate category. Hispanics/Latinos may be of any race.
Race / Ethnicity (NH = Non-Hispanic)	Pop 2020	2020
White alone (NH)	5,165	82.49%
Black or African American alone (NH)	35	0.56%
Native American or Alaska Native alone (NH)	0	0.00%
Asian alone (NH)	281	4.49%
Native Hawaiian or Pacific Islander alone (NH)	0	0.00%
Other race alone (NH)	29	0.46%
Mixed race or Multiracial (NH)	196	3.13%
Hispanic or Latino (any race)	555	8.86%
Total	6,261	100.00%

== Overview ==
Packanack's neighborhoods include; Packanack Estates, Packanack Lake, Packanack Manor, Packanack Ridge, and Packanack Woods. Members of the Packanack Lake Community Association, also known as Packanack Lake Country Club, can use the tennis club and golf club located on Osborne Terrace. Packanack residents can send their grammar school-aged children to the Packanack School, located at 190 Oakwood Drive, and residents can also send their high school aged children to Wayne Valley High School or the many private schools in and around the township of Wayne. There are summer camps and activities for the children who live in the lake which include golf lessons, sailing lessons and competitively swimming on the Lake's swim team, The Packanack Pirates. The Packanack Lake Association collects dues from Packanack Lake residents for the purpose of funding the upkeep and use of lake activities.

Transportation to business/commercial centers throughout North Jersey is via Route 3, Route 4, Route 20, Route 21, Route 23, U.S. Route 46, Interstate 80, Interstate 287 and the Garden State Parkway. Train stations and "Park and Rides" provide access to North Jersey suburbs and New York City.

Nearby country clubs include the Preakness Hills Country Club located on Ratzer Road and the North Jersey Country Club located on Hamburg Turnpike.

== History ==
The Packanack community began long ago when Native Americans farmed, fished and hunted in the area. One tribe, the Pacquanacs, are still remembered in the very name Packanack which is said to mean appropriately "land made clear for cultivation".

In 1780, it was farming country and marshlands not far from the Continental Army encampment of French and American soldiers. Close by were the headquarters of General George Washington at the Dey Mansion and Major-General Marquis de Lafayette at the Van Saun House. They still can be seen today.

== Geology ==
The Packanack area sits on two ridges running in roughly a north-south direction separated by a valley of marshland that in 1928 would be cleared of trees and brush; blocked at the south with an earth and clay dam to form Packanack Lake. That was when Joseph T. Castles, who had purchased 26 farms covering approximately 700 acres (280 ha) of these ridges and valley in 1925, began laying the groundwork for the development of a community. The lake itself is man-made.

== Gallery ==
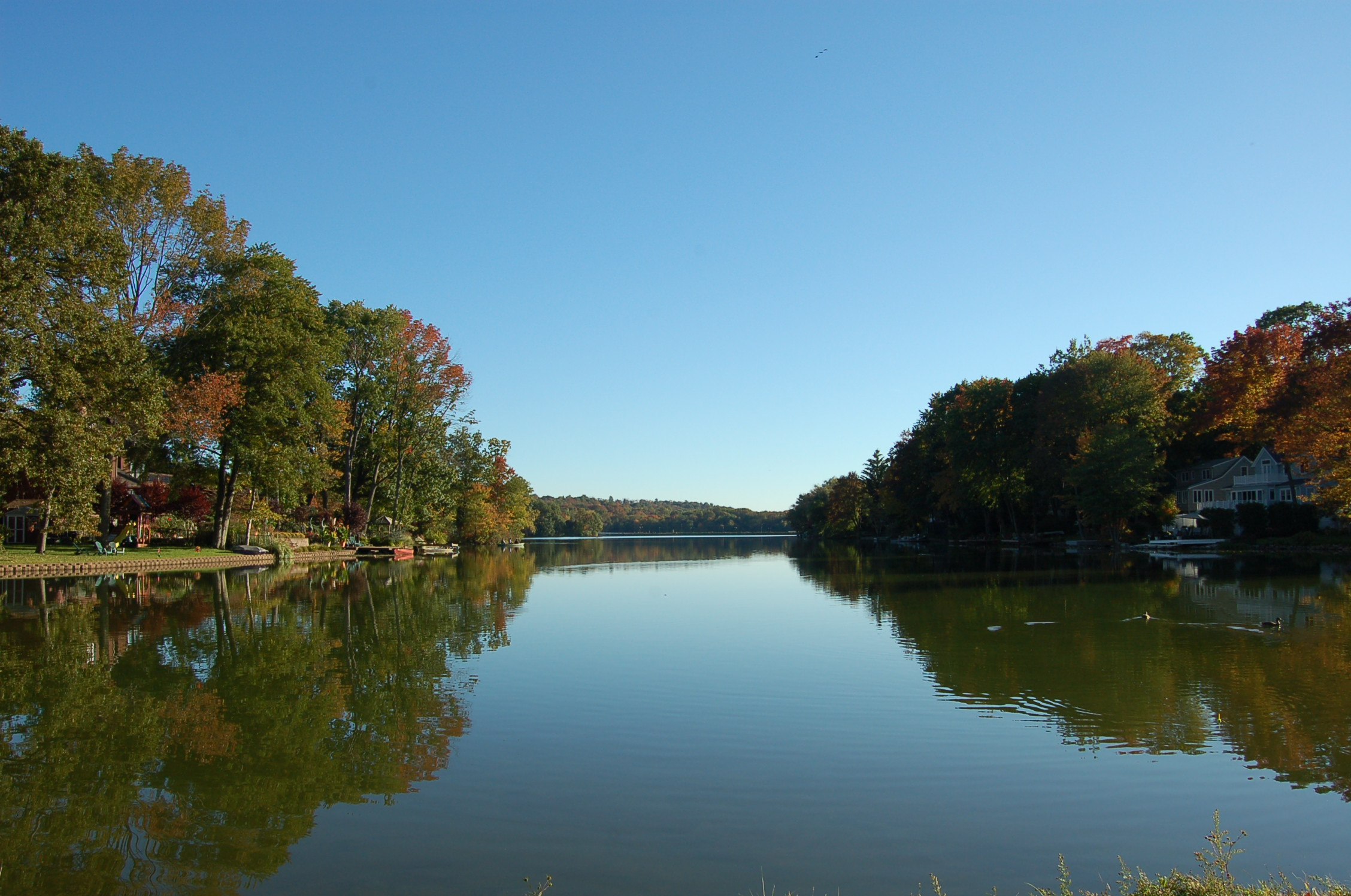

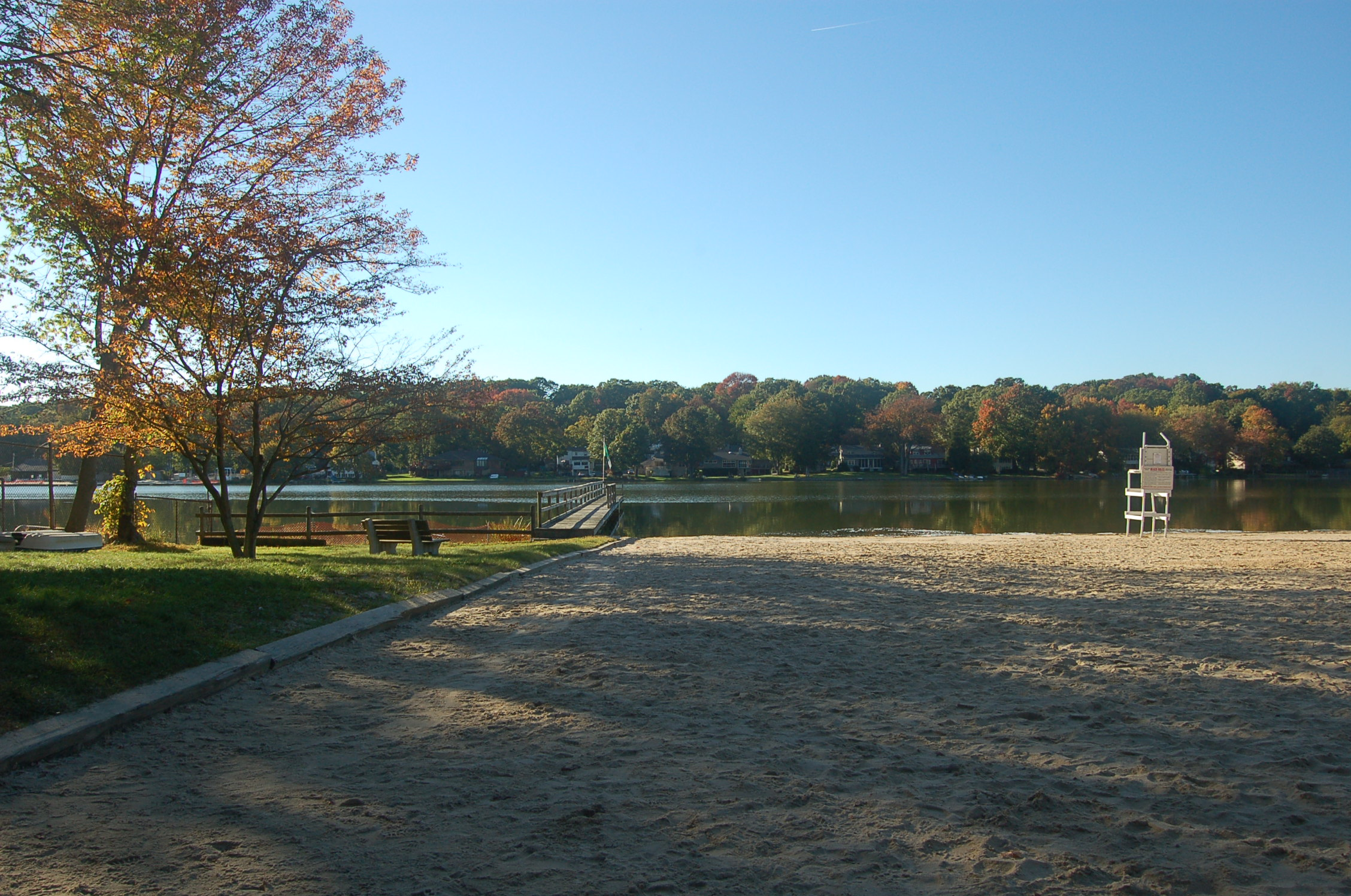

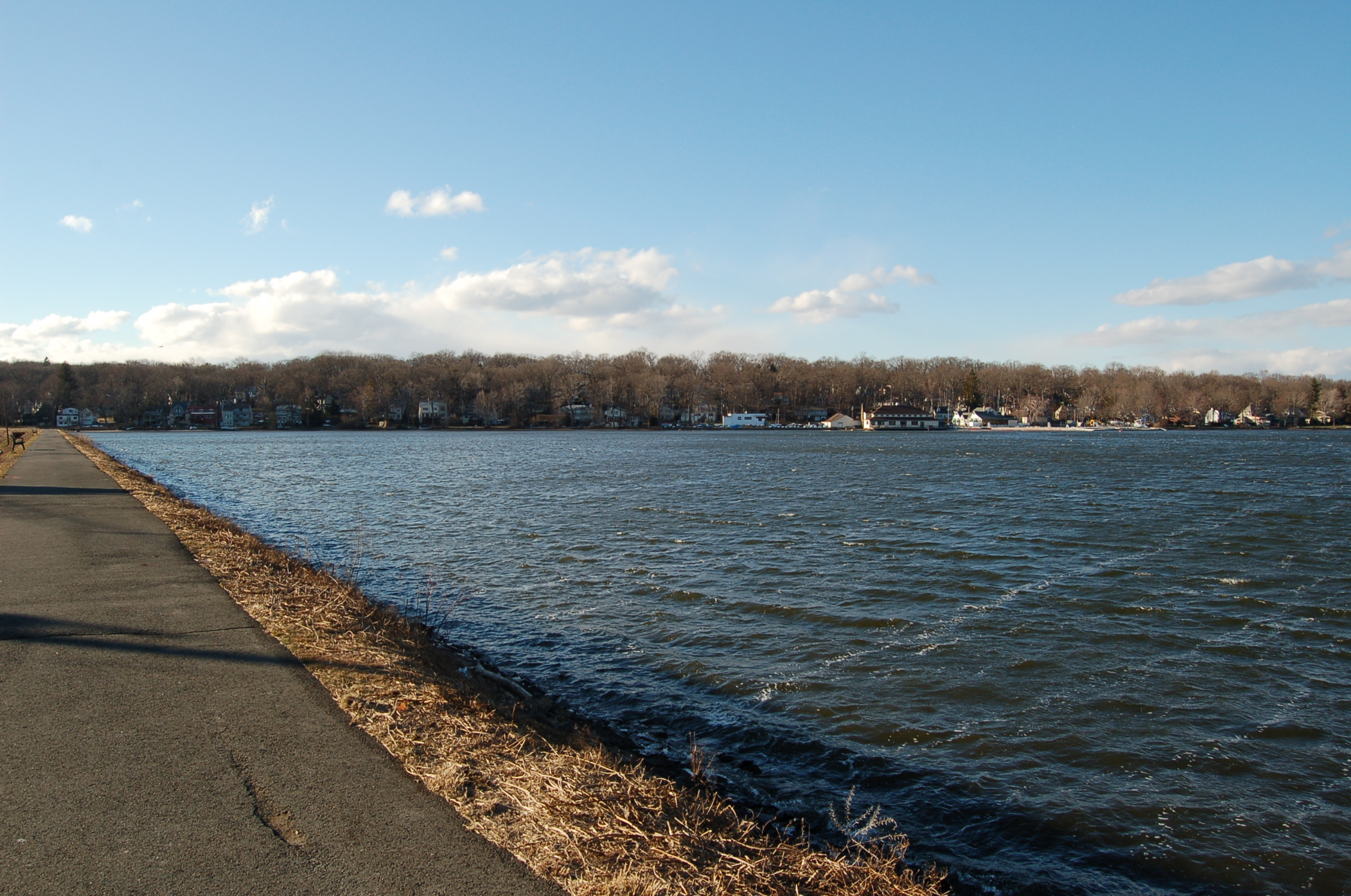
