= Narayanan Komerath =

Indo-American aerospace Engineer

Narayanan Menon Komerath
- Born: Thrissur City, Keralam
- Known for: Asteroid belt structures

Narayanan Menon Komerath is an Indian-born professor of Aerospace Engineering at the Georgia Institute of Technology in the United States. He has written numerous articles and books. He is known for his views on ways to build structures in space from asteroid debris, which could be used for a space-based economy, and for his research into microwave power transmission in space.

Komerath continues to take an active interest in Indian affairs. He has defended the US-based Indian Development and Relief Fund, a charity, from accusations that its funds were being used to foster communal violence in India. He has proposed a break-up of Pakistan to remove its ability to export global terror.

== Career ==
Narayanan Menon Komerath was born in Peringavu, Thrissur, Keralam, India. He studied at the Indian Institute of Technology Madras, obtaining a B.Tech. in Aeronautical Engineering in 1978. He then went to the Georgia Institute of Technology where he obtained a PhD in Aerospace Engineering (Turbulent Combustion) in 1982. Positions since then have included Fellow of the NASA Institute for Advanced Concepts, Sam Nunn Senior Security Fellow in the School of International Affairs (2004–2006) and Hesburgh Teaching Fellow at the Georgia Institute of Technology (2005). From 2008 to 2009 he was Chair of the Aerospace Division of the American Society for Engineering Education. For 2009/2010 he was Secretary/Treasurer of this division. He is Chairman of Scv Inc. in Alpharetta, Georgia, a manufacturer of analytical instruments founded in 1994.

== Scientific concepts ==
In May 2003 Popular Mechanics reported that Komerath thinks he found a way to crush the rocks in the asteroid belts using electromagnetic waves and assemble them into radiation shields and structures where humans could live, among other purposes. The idea came to Komerath by analogy with the technique of "acoustic shaping", where sound waves can accurately position small objects such as beads into larger solid objects within a weightless environment. In space, radio waves would take the place of sound waves. Although huge amounts of energy would be needed, solar power could be used and the approach would avoid the requirement to transport material from Earth. Komerath said "You don't go to investors and say 'I want to build a giant spinning cylinder in space that would house 10,000 people'. You go and say 'I want to build a space-based economy'. It's a business model that will work only if there are a lot of people who will go broke at the same time if it fails."

Since 2006 Komerath has been considering the problem of a global space power grid. Researchers at Georgia Tech working under the direction of Professor Narayanan Komerath are exploring microwave power beaming in space for military and commercial applications. It is thought that frequencies of around 220 GHz can achieve greater effective distances than the lower frequencies commonly used today. As a rational first step to building a space-based grid Komerath proposes a demonstration project to build a space-based power exchange connecting the United States to India.

== Societal Interventions ==
Komerath has been actively and publicly interested in events in the Indian subcontinent since May 1999. With the help of the India Development and Relief Fund (IDRF) he launched the Martyrs for National Integration Fund, which helps the families of people hurt in the war against terrorism. In 2002 leftist activists groups Sabrang Communications and South Asia Citizens Web published The Foreign Exchange of Hate: IDRF and the American Funding of Hindutva, which investigated how funding raised by the IDRF in the USA was being distributed in India. Komerath was one of the authors of a counter-report that denied the implied accusation that tribal activists, who had played a major role in the 2002 Gujarat violence, were linked to US funding sources.

Komerath praised the efforts of grassroots volunteers funded by the IDRF after the December 2004 tsunami. He reported claims that Sri Lankan army personnel had hijacked aid trucks that were trying to assist Tamils. He said some US-based Indians were attempting to hinder aid by warning that donations could be misused. Komerath welcomed the July 2005 US–India Civil Nuclear Agreement, but said the refusal of the US to support Pakistan's claim to a permanent seat on the United Nations Security Council was a victory for India.

In 2008 Komerath published an opinion paper that called for a break-up of Pakistan into five independent states that would be distracted by protecting themselves, and which would be destroyed if they veered towards religious fanaticism or terrorism. In the prelude of the paper he states "This article argues that the State of Pakistan should quite properly be the victim of its own terrorism. It must die, for the scourge of global terrorism to end." He furthermore states that "...all terrorism connections lead to Pakistan " and in the section labeled "What is the cost of not going to war?" contemplates the implications of an all-out war between Pakistan and India, arguing that it may be preferable to the current situation. He concludes the paper with this statement: "To put it bluntly, and succinctly: Give Peace A Chance. Destroy Pakistan. The life you save may be your own or that of someone you love." This had made many of his Pakistani students uncomfortable.

== Notable quotes ==
"My plans for retirement? I'm going to buy two TVs so that I can watch lots of cricket and my wife can watch mushy movies, but seriously, the most important thing I learned at the AE School is that a friendly smile can get you a very long way -- especially in working with the best minds in the world. And of course, I will miss the laughter of my students."

== Selected bibliography ==
- Narayanan Menon Komerath (1983). Measurement of pressure-velocity correlations in turbulent reacting flows. Georgia Institute of Technology. p. 330.
- Narayanan Menon Komerath (1986). Implementation and validation of a wake model for vortex-surface interactions in low speed forward flight. School of Aerospace Engineering, Georgia Institute of Technology.
- Narayanan Menon Komerath; S. G. Liou (1991). Definition of the unsteady vortex flow over a wing/body configuration. School of Aerospace Engineering, Georgia Institute of Technology.
- Narayanan Menon Komerath (1992). Quasi-periodicity in vortex flows. School of Aerospace Engineering, Georgia Institute of Technology.
- Narayanan Menon Komerath (1997). Measurement of fountain effect flows using Spatial correlation velosimetry. School of Aerospace Engineering, Georgia Institute of Technology. p. 126.
- Komerath, N.M., Smith, M.J., "Rotorcraft Wake Modeling: Past, Present and Future”. Proceedings of the European Rotorcraft Forum, Hamburg, Germany, September 2009.
- Komerath, N., “A Campus-Wide Course on Micro Renewable Energy Systems”. Proceedings of the ASEE National Conference, College Park, TX June 2009.
- Komerath, N., Venkat, V., Fernandez, J., “Near-Millimeter Wave Issues for a Space Power Grid”. Paper 2009–081, Proceedings of the SPESIF Conference, American Physical Society, Huntsville, AL, February 2009.
- Komerath, N.M., Nally, J., Tang, E.Z., “Policy Model for Space Economy Infrastructure” Acta Astronautica, Vol. 61(2007)11–12, p. 1066–1075
- Gregory, J., Sullivan J., Wanis, S., Komerath, N., “Pressure-sensitive paint as a distributed optical microphone array,” Journal of the Acoustical Society of America, 119(1), 251–261, 2006
