= Hans Ucko =

Minister of the Church of Sweden (born 1946)

- Born: 1946 (age 79–80)
- Occupation: Minister Church of Sweden
- Known for: Interfaith Dialog

Hans Ucko (born 1946) is a priest of the Church of Sweden and a member of the World Council of Churches (WCC). He has been extensively involved in interfaith dialog, particularly between Christians and Jews. He has written a number of books on the subject.

== Birth and education ==
Hans Ucko was born in 1946 in Sweden and educated in France, Sweden, Israel, and India. He studied in Paris at the "Institut Eglise et Monde Juif" and in Jerusalem at the Swedish Theological Institute and at the Shalom Hartman Institute. He obtained a Ph.D. in Theology from Serampore College, Calcutta.

== Career ==
From 1981 to 1989 Ucko was the Church of Sweden's Executive Secretary for Jewish-Christian Relations, interreligious dialogue and East Asian Relations. Ucko was appointed Program Secretary in the WCC's Office on Interreligious Relations and Dialogue. He was President of Religions for Peace Europe. In 2003 he delivered the Dr Stanley Samartha Memorial lecture to the Bangalore Initiative for Religious Dialogue, speaking on the topic: "Towards an ethical code of conduct for conversion". This became the subject of an article in "Current Dialogue".

Ucko edits the WCC's "Current Dialogue" publication. He sits on the Board of Trustees of Hartford Seminary. He is an official observer at the International Council of Christians and Jews. As of 2012 he was a member of the council of the World Day of Prayer and Action for Children, and co-chair of the Arigatou Foundation's joint campaign with UNICEF.

== Bibliography ==
Ucko has written several books and articles on inter-religious dialog.

- Hans Ucko (1994). Common roots, new horizons: learning about Christian faith from dialogue with Jews. WCC Publications. pp. 100. ISBN 2825411280.
- Hans Ucko (1995). Vom Judentum lernen: Gemeinsame Wurzeln- neue Wege. O. Lembeck. p. 149. ISBN 3874763021.
- Hans Ucko (1996). People of God, Peoples of God: A Jewish-Christian Conversation in Asia. WCC Publications. p. 112. ISBN 2825411728.
- The Jubilee Challenge: Utopia or Possibility?. Geneva: WCC. 1996.
- Hans Ucko (1998). Möte med människor av annan tro. Norma. p. 156. ISBN 9172170026.
- Hans Ucko (1999). Raices comunes, nuevos horizontes: Aprendiendo sobre la fe cristiana desde el diálogo con los judíos. Centro Luterano de Montevideo. p. 125. ISBN 9974670020.
- Hans Ucko (2000). A New Millennium: From Dialogue to Reconciliation : Christian and Jewish Reflections. Anti-Defamation League. p. 94.
- Hans Ucko (2002). The People and the People of God: Minjung and Dalit Theology in Interaction With Jewish-Christian Dialogue. LIT Verlag Münster. p. 202. ISBN 3825855643.
- Jean Halpérin; Hans Ucko (2005). Worlds of memory and wisdom: encounters of Jews and African Christians. World Council of Churches Publications. p. 161. ISBN 2825414298.
- Thinking Together; Hans Ucko (2005). Faces of the Other: A Contribution to Inter-religious Relations And Dialogue by the Group "Thinking Together". World Council of Churches. p. 63. ISBN 2825414646.
- Hans Ucko; Anantanand Rambachan; Melchizedec Thomas Thangaraj; A. Rashied Omar (2007). Hermeneutical Explorations in Dialogue: Essays in Honour of Hans Ucko. Indian Society for Promoting Christian Knowledge. p. 147. ISBN 8184580150.
