= Felix Ucko =

American field hockey player (1919–1996)

Personal information
- Born: January 4, 1919 New York City, U.S.
- Died: October 27, 1996 (aged 77) Caldwell, New Jersey, U.S.

Sport
- Sport: Field hockey

Felix Alfred Ucko (January 4, 1919 – October 27, 1996) was an American field hockey player. He competed at the 1948 Summer Olympics and the 1956 Summer Olympics. In the 1956 games, he played alongside his brother, Kurt Ucko.

Additionally, he was a psychiatrist. He was a member of the American Psychiatric Association, the American Association of Community Psychiatrists, and other professional organizations.

== Publications ==
- Ucko, Felix A. (1948). Stand der Herzchirurgie in den Vereinigten Staaten von Nordamerika (Hochschulschrift/Dissertation thesis). Goethe-Universität Frankfurt am Main. OCLC 720559781. ⁣DNB, Katalog der Deutschen Nationalbibliothek 481675914. Katalog der Bibliotheken der Goethe-Universität PPN 272224251.
- Ucko, Felix A. (December 1955). "Shock therapy can be safe". Diseases of the Nervous System. 16 (12): 373–4. ISSN 0012-3714. PMID 13270682. Google Books V5sBh2-Zz50C.
- Ucko, Felix (October 12, 1956). "Zur Witzelsucht in Deutsche Frauen". Arbeiten aus dem Staatinstitut für Experimentelle Therapie und dem Georg Spyer Hause zu Frankfurt. 14. Jena, Germany: 92.
- Ucko, F.A. (August 1962). "Clinical experience with chlorprothixene, a new psychotherapeutic agent". Diseases of the Nervous System. 23: 453–5. ISSN 0012-3714. PMID 13923425.
- Gehl, Raymond H.; Welkind, Allen; Ucko, Felix A. (January 1966). "Providing a therapeutic climate by pairing patients. A preliminary report". Mental Hygiene. 50 (1): 36–46. ISSN 0025-9683. PMID 5901679. Google Books X1A2AAAAIAAJ. HathiTrust uc1.b3597047.
- Ucko, Felix A. (September 5–11, 1966). Depression and its treatment. Depressions and related states. Fourth World Congress of Psychiatry. International Congress Series No. 150. Vol. 3: Free Communications. Amsterdam, etc.: Excerpta Medica Foundation (published May 1968). pp. 1834–1836. OCLC 460848. Google Books eyK2AAAAIAAJ, 785rAAAAMAAJ. HathiTrust uc1.b4295741, mdp.39015001636680.
- Ucko, Felix A. (August 1970) [corrected 2022-10-10]. "Psychotropics in anxiety and depression: Combination or single agent?". Diseases of the Nervous System. 31 (8): 539–541. ISSN 0012-3714. PMID 4394308. EBSCOhost 1971-04460-001.
