= Rowing at the 1948 Summer Olympics – Men's double sculls =

Men's double sculls at the Games of the XIV Olympiad
- Date: 5–9 August 1948
- Competitors: 24 from 12 nations

Medalists
1st place, gold medalist(s)		Dickie Burnell; Bert Bushnell	Great Britain
2nd place, silver medalist(s)		Ebbe Parsner; Aage Larsen	Denmark
3rd place, bronze medalist(s)		Juan Rodríguez; William Jones	Uruguay

The men's double sculls competition at the 1948 Summer Olympics in London took place are at Henley Royal Regatta Course on the Henley-on-Thames.

== Schedule ==
Date	Round
5 August 1948	Heats
6 August 1948	Repechage
7 August 1948	Semifinal
9 August 1948	Final

== Results ==
=== Heats ===
First boat of each heat qualified to the semifinal, remainder goes to the repechage.

==== Heat 1 ====
Rank	Rowers	Country	Time	Notes
1	Jacques Maillet; Christian Guilbert	France	6:47.8	Q
2	Dickie Burnell; Bert Bushnell	Great Britain	6:56.9	
3	Mario Ustolin; Francesco Dapiran	Italy	6:59.2	

==== Heat 2 ====
Rank	Rowers	Country	Time	Notes
1	Ebbe Parsner; Aage Larsen	Denmark	6:50.1	Q
2	Maurice Gueissaz; Maurice Matthey	Switzerland	6:58.7	
3	Gabriel Beaudry; Fred Graves	Canada	7:09.3	

==== Heat 3 ====
Rank	Rowers	Country	Time	Notes
1	Ben Piessens; Willy Collet	Belgium	6:50.9	Q
2	Tom Neumeier; Henk van der Meer	Netherlands	6:56.1	
3	Juan Rodríguez; William Jones	Uruguay	7:14.0	

==== Heat 4 ====
Rank	Rowers	Country	Time	Notes
1	Joe Angyal; Arthur Gallagher	United States	7:01.3	Q
2	Ángel Malvicino; Teodoro Nölting	Argentina	7:08.0	
3	Sándor Ormándi; József Simó	Hungary	7:12.1	

=== Repechage ===
First boat of each heat qualified to the semifinal.

==== Heat 1 ====
Rank	Rowers	Country	Time	Notes
1	Dickie Burnell; Bert Bushnell	Great Britain	?	Q
2	Tom Neumeier; Henk van der Meer	Netherlands	7:00.2	
3	Ángel Malvicino; Teodoro Nölting	Argentina	7:07.1	

==== Heat 2 ====
Rank	Rowers	Country	Time	Notes
1	Mario Ustolin; Francesco Dapiran	Italy	6:53.9	Q
2	Maurice Gueissaz; Maurice Matthey	Switzerland	7:00.2	
3	Sándor Ormándi; József Simó	Hungary	7:09.3	

==== Heat 3 ====
Rank	Rowers	Country	Time	Notes
1	Juan Rodríguez; William Jones	Uruguay	7:02.1	Q
2	Gabriel Beaudry; Fred Graves	Canada	7:08.7	

=== Semifinal ===
First boat of each heat qualified to the final.

==== Heat 1 ====
Rank	Rowers	Country	Time	Notes
1	Dickie Burnell; Bert Bushnell	Great Britain	7:55.7	Q
2	Joe Angyal; Arthur Gallagher	United States	8:07.3	
3	Ben Piessens; Willy Collet	Belgium	8:17.2	

==== Heat 2 ====
Rank	Rowers	Country	Time	Notes
1	Ebbe Parsner; Aage Larsen	Denmark	7:48.3	Q
2	Mario Ustolin; Francesco Dapiran	Italy	7:58.2	

==== Heat 3 ====
Rank	Rowers	Country	Time	Notes
1	Juan Rodríguez; William Jones	Uruguay	8:02.2	Q
2	Jacques Maillet; Christian Guilbert	France	8:33.2	

=== Final ===
Rank	Rowers	Country	Time	Notes
1st place, gold medalist(s)	Dickie Burnell; Bert Bushnell	Great Britain	6:51.3	
2nd place, silver medalist(s)	Ebbe Parsner; Aage Larsen	Denmark	6:55.3	
3rd place, bronze medalist(s)	Juan Rodríguez; William Jones	Uruguay	7:12.4	
