= Rowing at the 1952 Summer Olympics – Men's double sculls =

Men's double sculls at the Games of the XV Olympiad
- Venue: Meilahti
- Date: 20–23 July 1952
- Competitors: 32 from 16 nations

Medalists
1st place, gold medalist(s)		Tranquilo Cappozzo; Eduardo Guerrero	Argentina
2nd place, silver medalist(s)		Heorhiy Zhylin; Ihor Yemchuk	Soviet Union
3rd place, bronze medalist(s)		Miguel Seijas; Juan Rodríguez	Uruguay

The men's double sculls competition at the 1952 Summer Olympics took place at Meilahti, Finland. The event was held from 20 July until 23 July.

== Heats ==
First two rowers advanced directly to semi-finals. The others must compete in the repechage for remaining spots in the semi-finals.

=== Heat 1 ===
Rank	Athlete Name	Country	Time	Notes
1	Jacques Maillet; Achille Giovannoni	France	7:00.1	SF
2	Waldemar Beck; Gerhard Füssmann	Germany	7:04.3	SF
3	Robert George; Jos Van Stichel	Belgium	7:13.2	
4	Ebbe Parsner; Åge Larsen	Denmark	7:27.3	

=== Heat 2 ===
Rank	Athlete Name	Country	Time	Notes
1	Heorhiy Zhylin; Ihor Yemchuk	Soviet Union	7:02.5	SF
2	Miguel Seijas; Juan Rodríguez	Uruguay	7:06.9	SF
3	Peter Stebler; Émile Knecht	Switzerland	7:09.3	
4	Keijo Koivumäki; Eero Koivumäki	Finland	7:19.5	

=== Heat 3 ===
Rank	Athlete Name	Country	Time	Notes
1	Silvio Bergamini; Lodovico Sommaruga	Italy	7:01.3	SF
2	Pat Costello; Walter Hoover	United States	7:01.9	SF
3	John MacMillan; Peter Brandt	Great Britain	7:07.4	
4	Bob Williams; Derek Riley	Canada	7:19.3	

=== Heat 4 ===
Rank	Athlete Name	Country	Time	Notes
1	Tranquilo Cappozzo; Eduardo Guerrero	Argentina	7:04.4	SF
2	Antonín Malinkovič; Jiří Vykoukal	Czechoslovakia	7:11.6	SF
3	John Rogers; Murray Riley	Australia	7:16.7	
4	Tore Johansson; Curt Brunnqvist	Sweden	8:31.3	

== First repechage ==
The winner in each heat qualified for the semi-finals.

=== Heat 1 ===
Rank	Athlete Name	Country	Time	Notes
1	Robert George; Jos Van Stichel	Belgium	7:03.2	SF
2	Peter Stebler; Émile Knecht	Switzerland	7:05.8	
3	Tore Johansson; Curt Brunnqvist	Sweden	7:11.4	
4	Bob Williams; Derek Riley	Canada	7:15.5	

=== Heat 2 ===
Rank	Athlete Name	Country	Time	Notes
1	John Rogers; Murray Riley	Australia	7:03.0	SF
2	John MacMillan; Peter Brandt	Great Britain	7:04.4	
3	Ebbe Parsner; Åge Larsen	Denmark	7:09.3	
4	Keijo Koivumäki; Eero Koivumäki	Finland	7:12.0	

== Semi-finals ==
The winners in each heat qualified for the final, while the others must compete in the second repechage for the remaining spots in the final.

=== Semi-final 1 ===
Rank	Athlete Name	Country	Time	Notes
1	Antonín Malinkovič; Jiří Vykoukal	Czechoslovakia	7:23.5	F
2	Pat Costello; Walter Hoover	United States	7:24.3	
3	Heorhiy Zhylin; Ihor Yemchuk	Soviet Union	7:26.5	
4	Jacques Maillet; Achille Giovannoni	France	7:29.5	

=== Semi-final 2 ===
Rank	Athlete Name	Country	Time	Notes
1	Tranquilo Cappozzo; Eduardo Guerrero	Argentina	7:23.1	F
2	Waldemar Beck; Gerhard Füssmann	Germany	7:36.3	
3	Silvio Bergamini; Lodovico Sommaruga	Italy	7:36.7	
4	Miguel Seijas; Juan Rodríguez	Uruguay	8:04.0	

== Second repechage ==
The winners in each heat qualified for the final.

=== Heat 1 ===
Rank	Athlete Name	Country	Time	Notes
1	Miguel Seijas; Juan Rodríguez	Uruguay	7:01.7	F
2	Pat Costello; Walter Hoover	United States	7:03.6	
3	John Rogers; Murray Riley	Australia	7:13.1	

=== Heat 2 ===
Rank	Athlete Name	Country	Time	Notes
1	Jacques Maillet; Achille Giovannoni	France	7:06.3	F
2	Waldemar Beck; Gerhard Füssmann	Germany	7:08.2	
3	Robert George; Jos Van Stichel	Belgium	7:25.8	

=== Heat 3 ===
Rank	Athlete Name	Country	Time	Notes
1	Heorhiy Zhylin; Ihor Yemchuk	Soviet Union	7:07.5	F
2	Silvio Bergamini; Lodovico Sommaruga	Italy	7:16.0	

== Final ==
Rank	Athlete Name	Country	Time	Notes
1st place, gold medalist(s)	Tranquilo Cappozzo; Eduardo Guerrero	Argentina	7:32.2	
2nd place, silver medalist(s)	Heorhiy Zhylin; Ihor Yemchuk	Soviet Union	7:38.3	
3rd place, bronze medalist(s)	Miguel Seijas; Juan Rodríguez	Uruguay	7:43.7	
4	Jacques Maillet; Achille Giovannoni	France	7:46.8	
5	Antonín Malinkovič; Jiří Vykoukal	Czechoslovakia	7:53.8	
