= Bert Bushnell =

British rower (1921–2010)

Personal information
- Full name: Bertram Harold Thomas Bushnell
- Nicknames: Bert, Bertie
- Nationality: English
- Citizenship: British
- Born: 3 September 1921 Wargrave, Berkshire, England
- Died: 10 January 2010 (aged 88) Reading, Berkshire, England

Sport
- Country: Great Britain
- Sport: Rowing
- Event(s): Single and double sculls
- Club: Maidenhead Rowing Club
- Former partner: Dickie Burnell
- Retired: 1951
Medal record
Men's rowing
Gold medal – first place	1948 London	Double sculls

Bertram Harold Thomas Bushnell (3 September 1921 – 10 January 2010) was a British rower who competed in the 1948 Summer Olympics and won the gold medal alongside Dickie Burnell in the double sculls, having had hopes to compete in the single sculls following a series of victories whilst competing in South America.

Having initially competed in athletics whilst at school, he took up competitive rowing in 1939, and during the Second World War he worked at John I. Thornycroft & Company's shipyard as a marine engineer and was involved in the evacuation of Dunkirk. He retired from rowing in 1951 and ran his own company renting cabin cruisers, and had three children.

== Early life ==
Bushnell was born in Wargrave, Berkshire, the younger son of John "Jack" Henry Bushnell (born 17 January 1885 in Richmond, Surrey; died March 1970), a ship builder who had operated his own boatyard at Wargrave since 31 December 1917, and was a former rower who gave up his own Olympic dreams in order to provide for his family, and Lena Simmonds Bushnell (born January 1893 in Richmond, Surrey; died December 1957), who had been a shorthand typist and an opera singer. His older brother was Leonard John Bushnell (born 19 May 1918; died 1974). The Bushnell family have had a Royal Warrant since before the First World War and this has continued into the present generation with the senior member appointed a Royal Waterman to the reigning British monarch.

John Henry Bushnell carried on the business of renting self-propelled rowing boats, dinghies, skiffs, punts, camping punts, until the early 1920s when he obtained electric canoes followed closely by motor-driven launches. Both the motor-propelled craft could be hired for self-drive or with drivers. During this time boat building of various types was carried on at the site and, as years passed, larger and more sophisticated craft were constructed for both sale and hire. In the mid-1930s the first self-drive holiday hire cruiser was built and thereafter others followed up until 1939 when the boatyard took on rapid expansions to cope with Admiralty contracts to build fast motor boats for both Naval and RAF air/sea rescue.

Bushnell attended Henley Grammar School where he excelled at sport, including running the 100-yard dash in "evens" at Palmer Park. In his youth he was coached by sprinter Sandy Duncan. He became an apprentice at ship builders John I. Thornycroft & Company at the age of fourteen at the Southampton Docks.

== Career ==
Bushnell first competed in rowing in August 1939 at the Maidenhead Regatta. In order to retain his amateur status under the rules of the Amateur Rowing Association, Bushnell was ineligible to work for his father's shipbuilding business as a boat mechanic and instead continued to work for Thornycrofts, becoming a marine engineer. During the Second World War, Bushnell tested motor torpedo boat engines and worked a 52-hour week for £3 10s. He was also involved in the evacuation of Dunkirk. attaining the rank of Chief Petty Officer.

Following the war, Bushnell began to compete in rowing once more. At the 1946 Henley Royal Regatta, Bushnell (representing Maidenhead Rowing Club) lost to Burnell in the Diamond Challenge Sculls. While at the Marlow Regatta in 1946, he accepted an offer to travel to Argentina to train and compete there. While in South America in the summer of 1947, he was undefeated in several single scull races on the Rio Tigre and met Juan Perón, President of Argentina, and his wife Eva Perón. He won the Wingfield Sculls in 1947, but lost to Jack Kelly in the semi-final in the Diamond Challenge Sculls in 1947.

=== 1948 Summer Olympics ===
Bushnell hoped to compete at the 1948 Summer Olympics in the single scull event. However, after he was a distant runner-up by five lengths in the Diamond Challenge Sculls at Henley Royal Regatta on 4 July 1948, to Australian policeman Mervyn Wood, who subsequently won the Olympic singles that year, Bushnell was chosen instead to pair with old Etonian Oxonian rower Dickie Burnell in the Olympic double sculls event, having never previously trained with his new partner. Jack Beresford told Bushnell that there wasn't a chance for him to win the single sculls, and so created the double sculls team instead. Their differing physiques — Burnell was 6 ft 4in and weighed 14 1/2 stone, while Bushnell was 5 ft 10in and 10 1/2 stone — presented some difficulties in the boat, which Bushnell had to re-rig so that they were able to reach together.

Bushnell and Burnell only had a month to train for the Games, with animosity between the two due to the difference in their class backgrounds. Bushnell later said in an interview, "There was class tension there and it came from me being bloody awkward." Bushnell struck up a friendship with American rower John B. Kelly Jr. and Australian Merv Wood. The rowers' diets had been increased from the normal 2,500 calories allowed by rationing to a "miner's diet" of 3,600 calories. However, the other teams were having food flown in specially in order to increase their calorie intake and allow them to train more. Bushnell would invite Kelly and Wood over for dinner, with his guests bringing the food. Bushnell and Burnell both attended the opening ceremony of the 1948 Games, something Bushnell described as "dreadful", as they gave the athletes poorly fitting uniforms and made them stand out in the sun en-masse for three hours.

At the Olympic regatta on the Henley Royal Regatta course, which only measured 1900 metres, Bushnell was in the bow and Burnell the stern seat, or as Bushnell indicated later: "I was on the bridge and Dickie was in the engine room". In an attempt to avoid the favoured Danish duo of Ebbe Parsner and Aage Larsen in the semi-finals, Bushnell and Burnell deliberately came second to France in the first round. According to Bushnell: "Dickie decided we should lose the first heat so as not to meet the Danes in the semi-final. ... I wouldn't have had the nerve to do that. We could have won, but we didn't." They subsequently won both the repêchage followed by the semi-final.

On Monday, 9 August 1948, in front of a home crowd estimated to be 20,000 spectators, Bushnell and Burnell competed in the Olympic final against the double scull teams of Uruguay and Denmark. Bushnell nearly missed the final, held at the Leander Club in Henley, as stewards would not allow him to enter; he later explained "You see I wasn't a member then – not posh enough". At around the three-minute mark, the British team decided to push for the win, eventually taking it in six minutes and 51.3 seconds, 1 1/2 lengths ahead of the favoured Danish duo of Parsner and Larsen (6:55.3) and five ahead of William Jones and Juan A. Rodriguez Iglesias of Uruguay (7:12.4). On the jetty they were awarded their medals while standing in their socks. As there were no ribbons for the medals due to cost-saving measures, they were given them in presentation boxes while "God Save the King" was played by a band.

Decades later Bushnell indicated in an interview with Janie Hampton: "The Olympics didn't feel a big deal. It was like Henley regatta with a few foreigners thrown in." Despite winning an Olympic gold medal, Bushnell returned to his occupation, indicating in an interview: "There was no fuss and my life wasn't changed. I went back to work as a marine engineer on Monday. I didn't get paid to have days off and my employers considered I was a bloody nuisance."

In the 1949 European Championships Bushnell and Burnell finished 5th. In the Henley Royal Regatta of June 1949, Bushnell withdrew from the single sculls to focus on the double sculls. However, Bushnell and Burnell were defeated by the Danish team of Parsner and Larsen in the double sculls event in a record-breaking race.

== Later life ==
In September 1948 Bushnell married Margaret Campbell (born 27 October 1925; died December 1988). They spent the first few years of their married life on a Thames sailing barge, moored up outside the boathouse in Maidenhead. They had three daughters: Patricia Pueschel, Jacqueline Page, and Susan Bushnell, and six granddaughters.

After World War II, his father bought a second boatyard at Maidenhead. Later the businesses were split with Bert transferring to Maidenhead, and his older brother Leonard (and later his two sons, Nicholas and Paul) operating the original Wargrave boatyard until Leonard's death in 1974. After retiring from competitive rowing in 1951, Bushnell played association football for Maidenhead United and set up his own boatyard in Maidenhead, that rented cabin cruisers. Bushnell pioneered the development of recirculative "pump-out" lavatories which freed holidaymakers from elsan emptying and earned him the affectionate nickname "Recirc Bert". Bushnell was a founder member and later Chairman of the British Hire Cruiser Federation. After selling his business in 1979, he moved to The Algarve, Portugal. After the death of his wife in December 1988, Bushnell returned to live in Henley. In 1990 Bushnell had a lung removed.

About 2000 Bushnell donated his gold medal to the River and Rowing Museum in Henley, as he was concerned about it being stolen from his home and figured it was easy enough to go and visit it at the museum. In October 2006 Bushnell presented the trophy to Alan Campbell as winner of the Wingfield Sculls. Bushnell died at the Royal Berkshire Hospital in Reading, Berkshire on Saturday, 9 January 2010, aged 88, survived by his three daughters and his partner Monica Rees. His funeral was on 27 January 2010 at the Parish Church of Saint Mary the Virgin at Henley-on-Thames.

== Legacy ==
Bushnell was initially thought to be the final surviving gold medallist from the British team at the 1948 Summer Olympics, however David Bond (who won a gold medal in the sailing Swallow class) wrote in to The Guardian to inform the newspaper that he was very much alive.

Hitchambury Homes created a housing development called Bushnell Place in honour of Bert Bushnell on Alwyn Road, Maidenhead. Bushnell and Burnell's Olympic success is featured at the Maidenhead Heritage Centre. Bushnell and Burnell and their efforts in the 1948 Summer Olympics are featured in "The Perfect Rower: 100 Years of Racing for Glory" exhibition at the River and Rowing Museum, from 31 March to 30 September 2012.

On 25 July 2012, two days before the 2012 Summer Olympics in London, BBC One screened the film Bert and Dickie (also called Going For Gold: The '48 Games), depicting Burnell and Bushnell's achievement at the 1948 Games, with Bushnell portrayed by Doctor Who actor Matt Smith and Sam Hoare portraying Burnell. The film's writer, William Ivory, met Bushnell before his death in 2010.
