= Richard Burnell =

English rower (1917–1995)

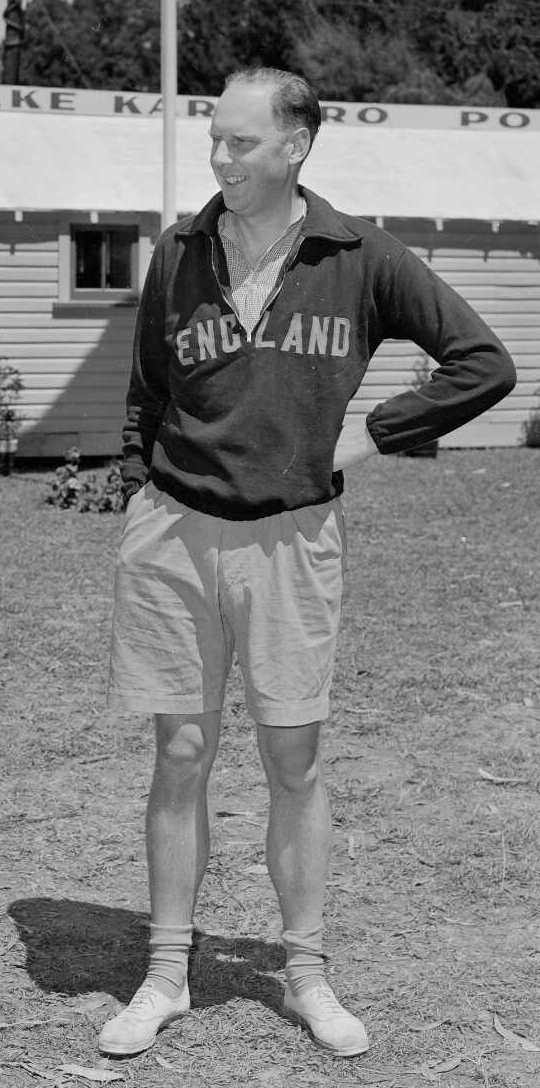
- Richard ('Dick') Burnell in 1950

Personal information
- Full name: Richard Desborough Burnell
- Nationality: English
- Born: 26 July 1917 Henley-on-Thames, England
- Died: 29 January 1995 (aged 77) Oxfordshire
- Height: 6 ft 4 in (193 cm)
- Weight: 14.5 st (203 lb; 92 kg)

Sport
- Country: Great Britain
- Sport: Rowing
- Club: Kingston Rowing Club; Leander Club
- Former partner: Bert Bushnell
Medal record
Representing Great Britain
Olympic Games
Gold medal – first place	1948 London	Double sculls
British Empire Games
Representing England
Bronze medal – third place	1950 Auckland	Eights

Richard Desborough Burnell (26 July 1917 – 29 January 1995) was an English rower who won a gold medal at the 1948 Olympics alongside Bert Bushnell in the double sculls. He and his father Charles are the only father and son in Olympic history to have both won gold medals in rowing.

== Career ==
Burnell was born in Henley-on-Thames the son of Charles Burnell who won a gold medal in the eights at the 1908 Summer Olympics. He was educated at Eton College and Oxford University.

In May 1939, Burnell was commissioned into the London Rifle Brigade. He was on the losing Oxford team in The Boat Race in 1939. He was a rowing correspondent for The Times and wrote several books on rowing matters. He competed for Kingston Rowing Club and in 1946 won the Wingfield Sculls.

=== 1948 Summer Olympics ===
At the 1948 Olympics Burnell won a gold medal with Bert Bushnell in the double sculls, Burnell and Bushnell having never previously trained together. Jack Beresford told Bushnell that he had no chance to win the single sculls, and so created the double sculls team instead. Their differing physiques – Burnell was 6 ft 4 inches and weighed 14 1/2 stone, while Bushnell was 5 ft 10 inches and 10 1/2 stone – presented some difficulties in the boat, which Bushnell had to re-rig so that they were able to reach together.

The pair only had a month to train for the Games, with animosity between the two due to the difference in their class backgrounds. Bushnell later said in an interview, "There was class tension there and it came from me being bloody awkward." Bushnell struck up a friendship with American rower John B. Kelly Jr. and Australian Mervyn Wood. The rowers' diets had been increased from the normal 2,500 calories allowed by rationing to a "miner's diet" of 3,600. However, the other teams were having food flown in specially to increase their calorie intake and allow them to train more. Bushnell would invite Kelly and Wood over for dinner, with his guests bringing the food. Bushnell and Burnell both attended the opening ceremony of the 1948 Games, something Bushnell described as "dreadful", as they gave the athletes poorly fitting uniforms and made them stand out in the sun en-masse for three hours.

On the Henley Royal Regatta course, they lost to France in the first round, but then won both the repêchage followed by the semi-final. On 9 August 1948, in front of a home crowd, Bushnell and Burnell competed in the Olympic final against the double scull teams of Uruguay and Denmark. Bushnell nearly missed the final, held at the Leander Club in Henley-on-Thames, as stewards would not allow him to enter; he later explained "You see I wasn't a member then – not posh enough". At around the three-minute mark, the British team decided to push for the win, eventually taking it in six minutes and 51.3 seconds, two lengths ahead of the favoured Danish duo of Ebbe Parsner and Aage Larsen (6:55.3) and five ahead of Uruguay (7:12.4). On the jetty they were awarded their medals while standing in their socks. There were no ribbons for the medals due to cost saving measures, and so they were given them in presentation boxes while God Save the King was played by a band.

=== After Olympics ===
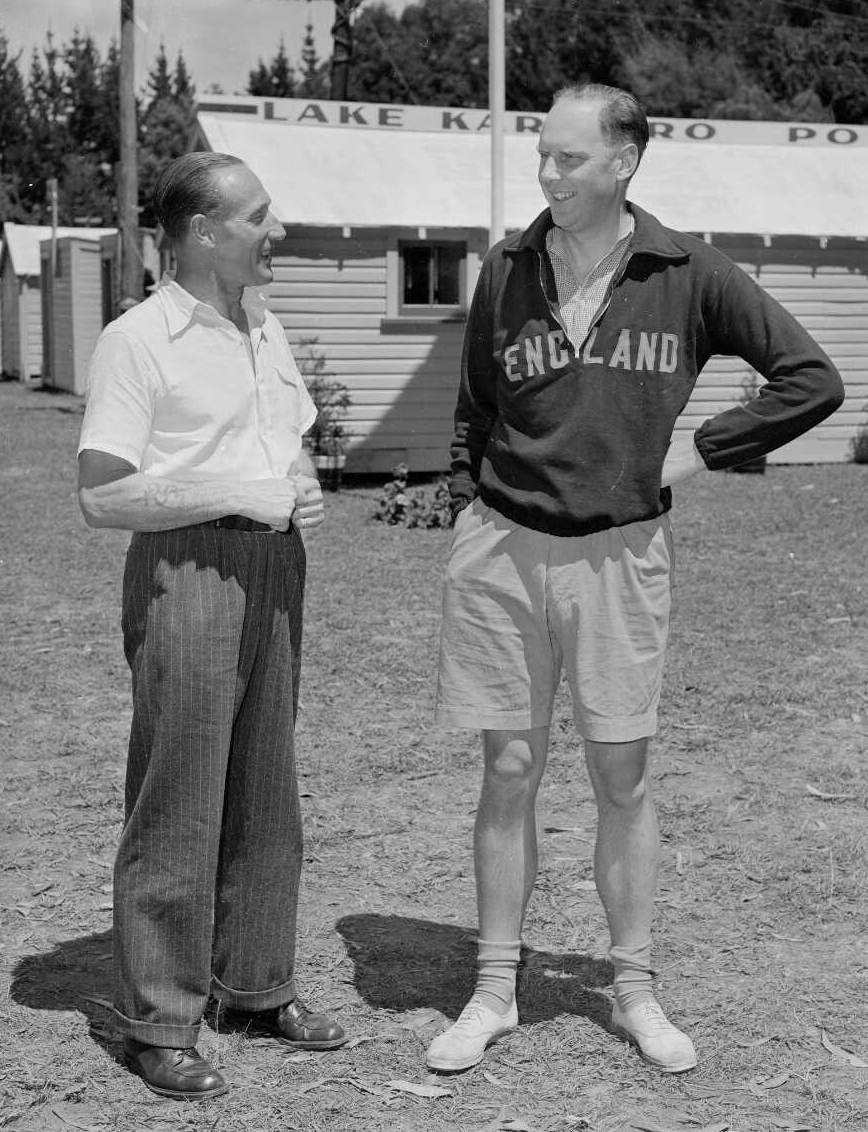
Beresford and Burnell (right) at the 1950 British Empire Games

Burnell won a bronze medal in the eights at the 1950 British Empire Games, and in 1951 he won the Double Sculls Challenge Cup at Henley Royal Regatta, together with Pat Bradley. He continued to write on international rowing events for the Sunday Times until 1990.

== Personal life ==
Burnell and his father Charles Burnell are the only father and son in Olympic history to have both won gold medals in rowing. In 1940 Burnell married Rosalind, a daughter of English Olympic gold medal-winning rower Stanley Garton. They had five children: Peter, John, Edward, Alexandra (“Zandra”), and Elizabeth (“Tizzy”). Burnell's son, Peter, rowed for Oxford in 1962.

== Works ==
Burnell published several books on rowing, including

- Swing Together: Thoughts on Rowing (1952)
- The Oxford & Cambridge Boat Race, 1829–1953 (1954)
- Sculling: With Notes on Training and Rigging (1955)
- Henley Regatta: A History (1957)

== Legacy ==
During the run up to the 2012 Summer Olympics in London, the BBC produced the film Bert and Dickie (also called Going For Gold: The '48 Games), depicting Burnell and Bushnell's achievement at the 1948 Games, with Sam Hoare in the role of Burnell and Matt Smith portraying Bushnell.
