= Ottawa Rowing Club =

Canadian rowing club

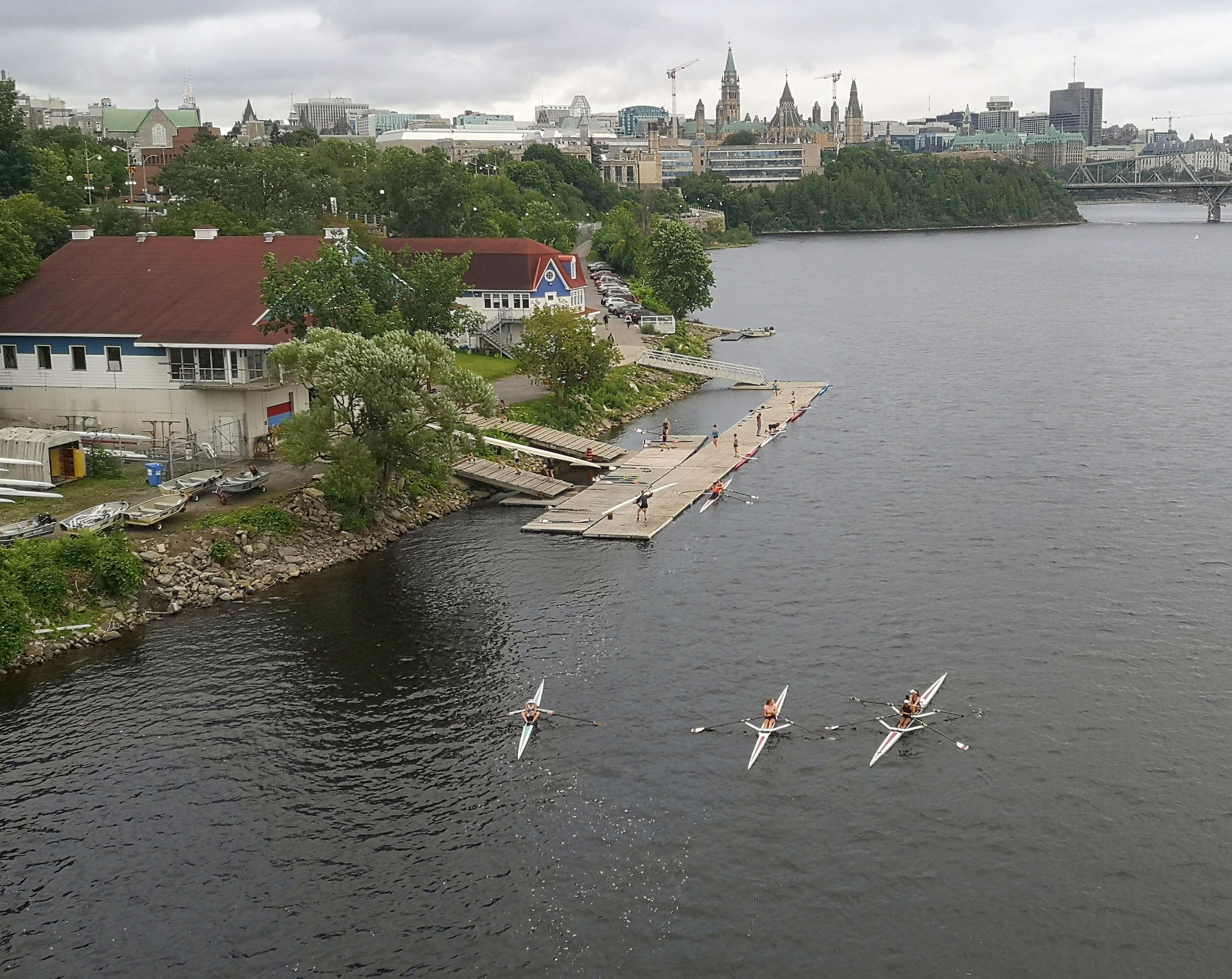
- Location: Ottawa, Ontario
- Coordinates: 45°26′7.09″N 75°41′59.77″W
- Founded: 1867
- Affiliations: Rowing Canada
- Website: ottawarowingclub.com

The Ottawa Rowing Club (ORC) is a rowing club based in the city of Ottawa, Ontario. It is the oldest continuous rowing club in Canada. It is a registered club with Rowing Canada and Row Ontario.

== Location ==
Members of the Ottawa Rowing Club practice on the Ottawa River, from Chaudière Falls to Lower Duck Island, passing in front of the mouths of the Rideau River and Gatineau River, and along the shore of Kettle Island.

== History ==
=== Early rowing clubs ===
In the 1840s, rowing clubs and regattas appeared in the Upper Canada communities of Toronto, Brockville, Monkton, and Cobourg. By this time, Canadian oarsmen were competing against British and American oarsmen in regattas in Halifax, Toronto, Boston, Philadelphia, Chicago, and other centres.

=== History from 1867 to 1896 ===
The Ottawa Rowing Club was founded on June 6, 1867. John A. Macdonald was its inaugural president.

The club's first regatta, on September 26, 1867, was described as follows:

'Throughout the afternoon crowds of people lined the river banks to witness the sport, while the bosom of the river literally swarmed with all sorts of sailing craft, from the tiniest little shell up to the stateliest steamboat.' The event attracted competitors from Toronto, Hamilton and Quebec City, but in the showcase first event — a four-mile, open boat sailing race — local businessmen Edward McGillivray in Who's Ahead and club secretary R.H. Haycock in Undine were even in the final stretch before Who's Ahead answered its own question, winning by 'about three lengths.' Despite the dramatic finish in the first of seven races, spectators grumbled that the regatta overall was a bore, with long delays between races. But 'the start has been made,' Haycock wrote to the Ottawa Times in response to the complaints, and the club would 'spare no trouble in endeavouring to improve upon this, the first attempt.'

The initial regattas organized by the club were mainly for professional rowers and attracted numerous crews and spectators. As an example, ten races were held at the 1869 regatta, with entrance fees per crew up to $10 and prizes for first place up to $100. A special train by the Saint-Lawrence and Ottawa railroad was offered for "the convenience of parties desiring to return the same evening." Barges were also provided for spectators.

The original club house was a wooden building, initially built on pontoons, and moored to the shore of the Ottawa river at the foot of Parliament Hill, between the Rideau canal and the Chaudière Falls. Whilst the view from the club house over the Chaudière Falls was picturesque, the rowing conditions were difficult: vast fields of sawdust and other refuse from an immense lumber mill situated about the falls, and logs escaping from the booms. Each spring, along with the melting ice, the club house floated downstream and came aground. Every year it was brought back up near the Rideau canal. As a result of those difficult environmental conditions, a "new and commodious boat house" was built in preparation to the 1869 Regatta organized by the club.

In 1870, the club would have ceased their activities and the ownership of the boat house was transferred "to two or three members of the late Club". Discussions on the formation of a Boat House Company were held in order to avoid selling the property and boathouse (purchase offers were made by external parties). There is no record of the club from 1871 to 1874, until 25 June 1875 when the club would have been re-introduced with approximately 100 members.

In 1884 and 1885, the club house suffered damages when it sank. Members of the club, led by P. D. Ross, discussed building a permanent foundation for the boathouse in 1887. In 1891, Ross, an executive committee member of the Canadian Association of Amateur Oarsmen, declined hosting the association's regatta due to the bad course on the Ottawa river and unsatisfactory financial condition of the Ottawa Rowing Club.

=== History from 1896 ===
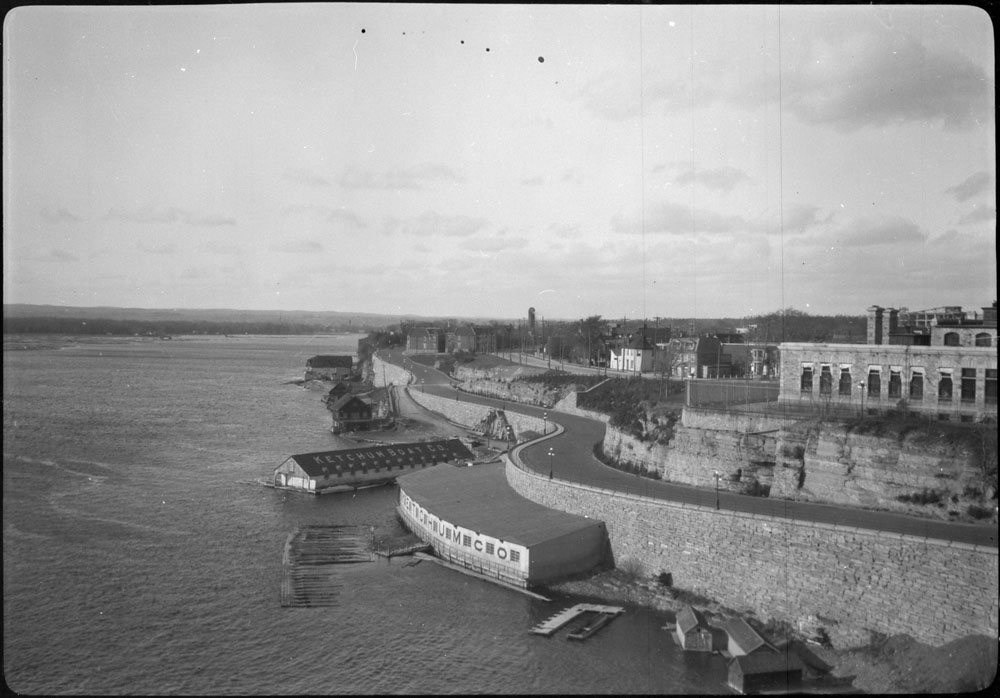
Northward view of the Ottawa River from Nepean point in 1918 with the Ketchum Boat Manufacturing in the foreground and the Ottawa Rowing Club in the background.

In spring 1896, the club purchase a riverfront property below John A. Macdonald's home Earnscliffe. The boathouse would be left at its current, permanent location.

For six consecutive years, from 1905 to 1911, members of the club were the North American champions. The two world wars were difficult years for the club, with fourteen members losing their lives while serving during World War I, and with the boathouse showing signs of deterioration due to neglect.

During the Depression years, P.D. Ross, former editor of the defunct Ottawa Journal, was president of the club. He infuriated his reporters by paying them small salaries while openly spending into equipment and upkeep for the rowing club.

The 1950s and 1960s was a period of decline for the Ottawa Rowing Club. After seizing the club due to financial constraints, in 1967 the City of Ottawa agreed to restore the part of the old boathouse which still exists today, but decided to demolish the other half of the building due to its poor condition. The demolished portion of the building stored boats and included a ballroom. In that year, the club only had nine members, and the permanent closure of the club was being debated.

Volunteers, such as Peter King, supported the development of rowing in Ottawa in the 1970s. The rowing boom resulted in two new clubs (that do not exist anymore): the Nepean Rowing Club and the Ottawa Carleton Rowing School.

With close to 1,000 members, the Ottawa Rowing Club is today one of the largest clubs in Canada.

=== University rowing ===
In 1949, when the University of Ottawa created the Physical Education Program, the Ottawa Rowing Club offered equipment and coaches.

== Facilities ==
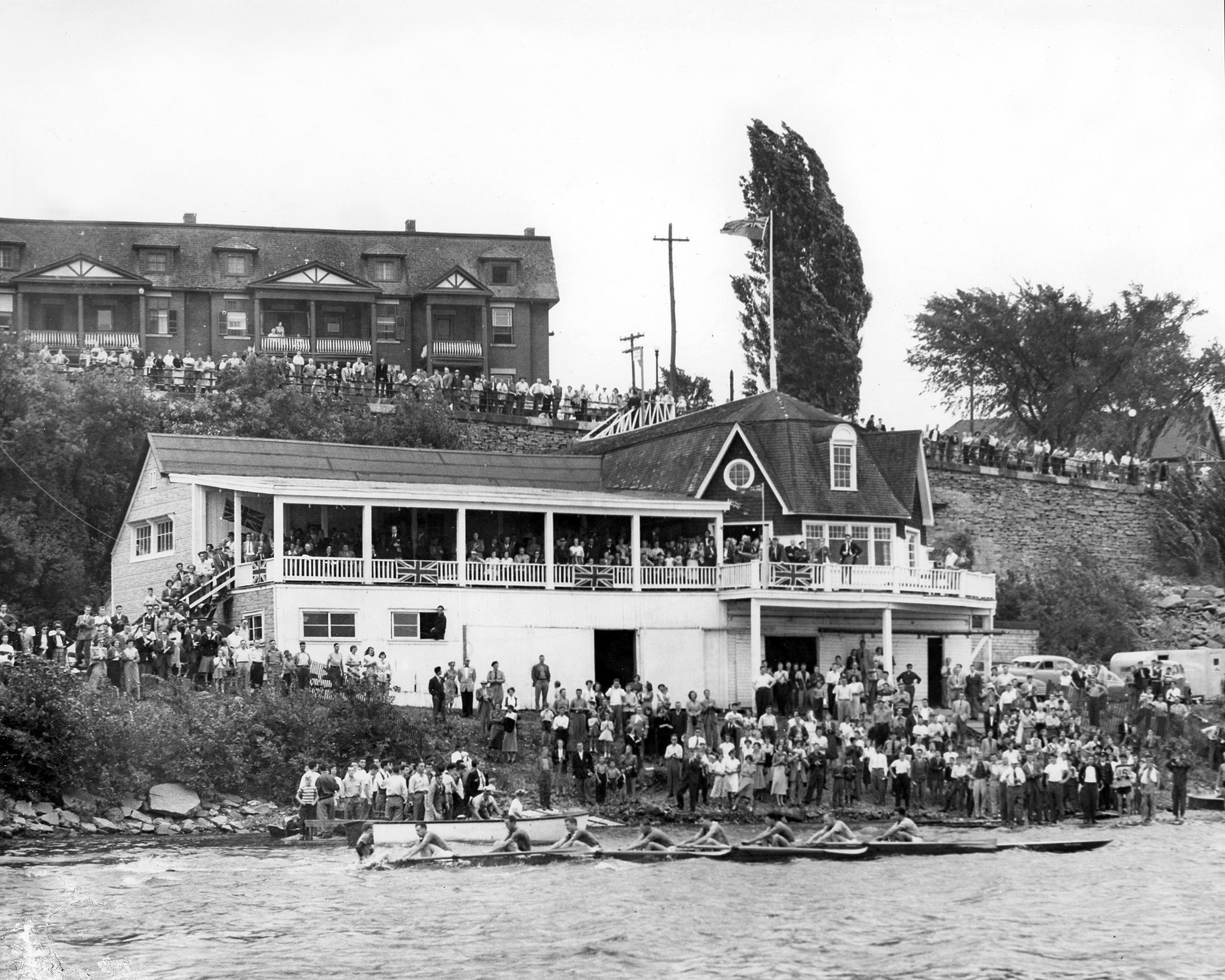
1951 P.D. Ross regatta final in front of the Ottawa Rowing Club. The portion of the club house shown on the left of the picture and the house apartments above the cliff no longer exist.

The Ottawa Rowing Club facilities include two main buildings. The older building (est. 1896) houses members' privately owned skiff on the ground floor. The second floor is an interpretation centre that also serves as banquet facilities rented out for weddings and other conventions. The building was renovated in 1999 by the City of Ottawa.

The second club house was built in 1987. It consists of a two-story building with four bays for shell and oar storage on the ground floor. Administrative offices, change rooms, and ergometers and weight room are located on the second floor.

== Notable crews and rowers ==
=== The 1910 crew ===
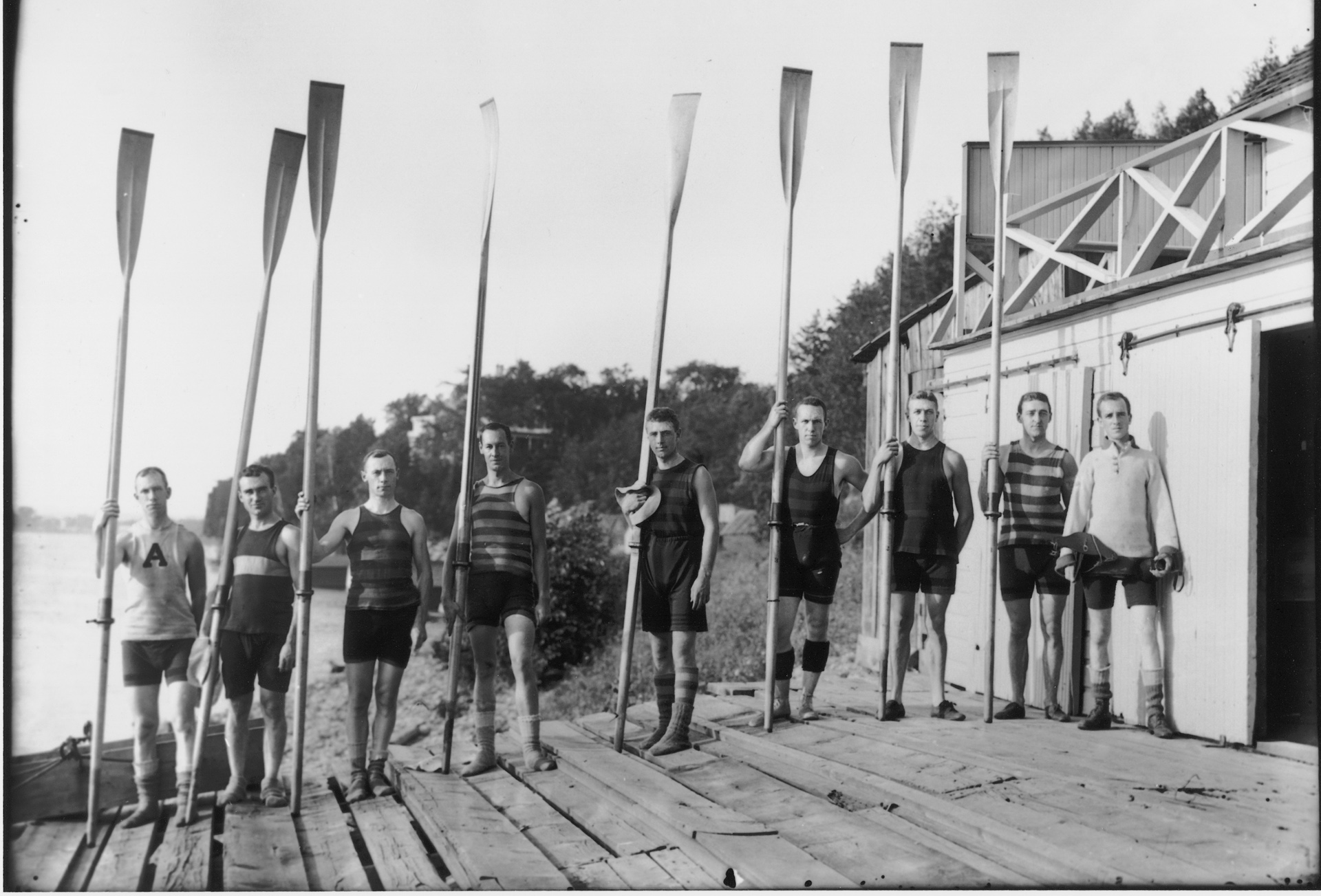
1910 Ottawa rowing crew

In 1908 two four-man crews won numerous Canadian and American championships. These two crews were joined into a new shell in 1910: the "Bagnall", christened to the name of the person who provided the funds to purchase the boat. The eight won the 1910 Royal Canadian Henley Regatta and was the first holder of the Ned Hanlan Memorial Trophy. Within 24 hours of the victory, Ottawans raised funds to bring the crew to the National Association Regatta in Washington, D.C., where the Ottawa crew won again. The eight crew, but also a four-man crew, later competed at the Grand Challenge Cup of the Henley Royal Regatta in 1911, where they lost to Magdalen College, of Oxford in the semi-finals. The coach of the 1910 crew was Jan A. Ten Eyck who captured ten U.S. National Championships as the coach for Syracuse University.

Professional hockey player Harvey Pulford joined the Ottawa Rowing Club in 1905, and there, as stroke with the junior fours and then the senior eights, he brought first-place honours to the club at various regattas. In 1909, the Canadian Association of Amateur Oarsmen reinstated him after he had played professional hockey, despite being ineligible to compete as an amateur because he had played professional hockey. He was a member of the 1910 Ottawa Rowing Club eight, and later served as president of the club until his resignation in 1936.

=== Participation in international events ===
Below is a list of athletes who have rowed with (or coached/worked at) the Ottawa Rowing Club and have participated in international rowing events.

==== Olympic and Paralympic Games ====
Name	Edition	Event
Gabriel Beaudry	London 1948	M2x
Fred Graves	London 1948	M2x
James (Jim) Walker	Munich 1972	M4+
Bev Cameron	Montreal 1976	W2x
Rob Marland	Seoul 1988	M4+
Mike Forgeron	Barcelona 1992	M8+
Rob Marland	Barcelona 1992	M8+
Anna van der Kamp	Atlanta 1996	W8+
Alison Korn	Atlanta 1996	W8+
Anna van der Kamp	Atlanta 1996	W2−
Mike Forgeron	Atlanta 1996	M2x
Alison Korn	Sydney 2000	W8+
Larry Varga	Sydney 2000	M8+
Rodrigo Ideus	Beijing 2008	M1x
Morgan Jarvis	London 2012	LM2x
Derek O'Farrell	London 2012	M4−
David Blair	London 2012 (Paralympics)	LTAMix4+
Cristy Nurse	Rio de Janeiro 2016	W8+
Antje von Seydlitz-Kurzbach	Rio de Janeiro 2016	W8+
Christine Roper	Rio de Janeiro 2016	W8+
Nicole Hare	Rio de Janeiro 2016	W2−
Jennifer Martins	Rio de Janeiro 2016	W2−
Andrew Todd	Rio de Janeiro 2016 (Paralympics)	LTAMix4+
Nicole Hare	Tokyo 2020	W4−
Jennifer Martins	Tokyo 2020	W4−
Christine Roper	Tokyo 2020	W8+
Andrew Todd	Tokyo 2020 (Paralympics)	PR3Mix4+

== Club colours ==
The colours of the club are Navy Blue diagonal stripe with Cardinal Red background. In 1887, the club's uniform consisted of a Navy Blue jacket, trimmed with Cardinal Red, white flannel trousers, and a white guernsey, trimmed with the club colours; and a Navy Blue cap with Cardinal Red bars, or a straw hat with the club colours and Navy Blue and Cardinal Red stripped stockings.

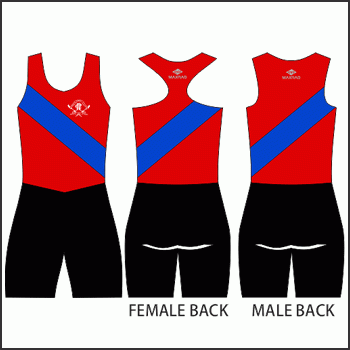
Uniform

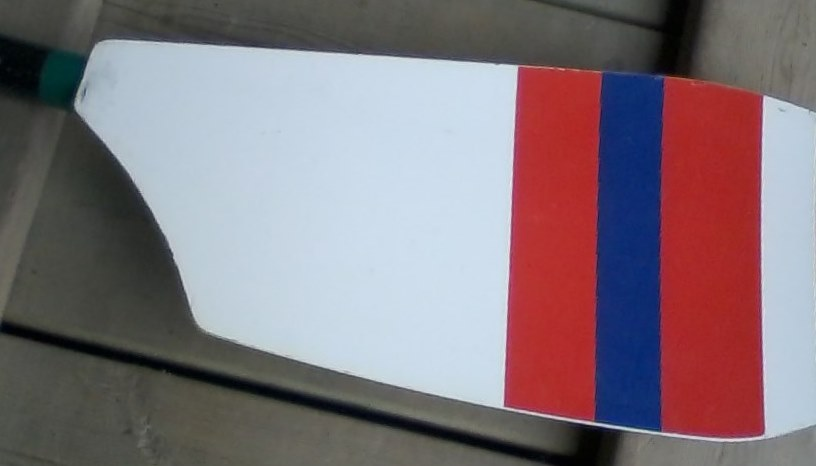
Blade colours

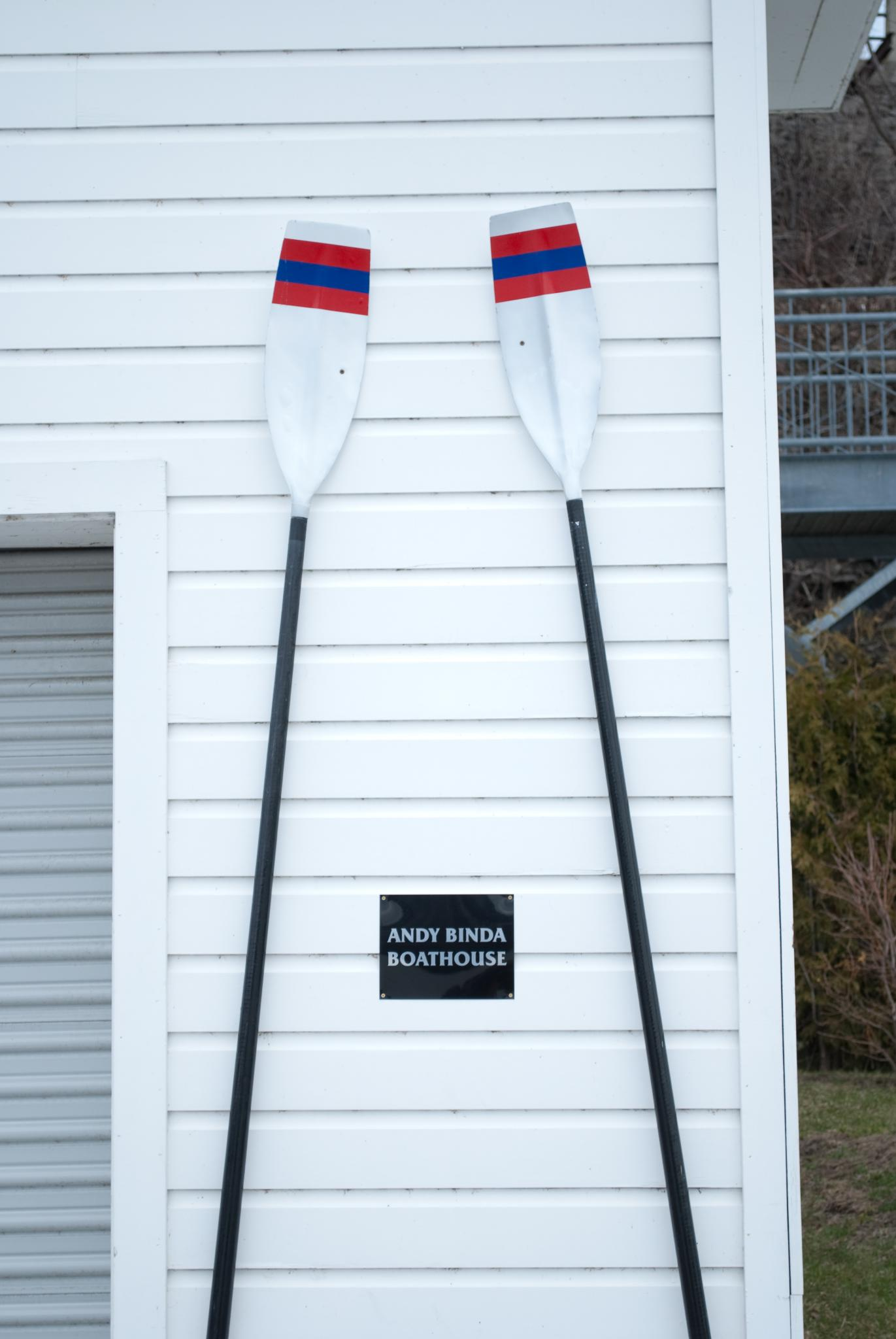
Oar colours, on the Andy Binda Boathouse
