= Koivumäki =

Koivumäki is a Finnish surname. Notable people with the surname include:

- Eero Koivumäki (1924–2013), Finnish rower
- Keijo Koivumäki (1926–2017), Finnish rower
- Nina Koivumäki (born 1985), Finnish judoka
