= Bob Williams (rower) =

Canadian rower

Personal information
- Birth name: Robert Williams
- Born: August 21, 1931; Hamilton, Ontario, Canada
- Died: September 10, 2017 (aged 86); Hamilton, Ontario, Canada

Sport
- Sport: Rowing

Robert Harley Williams (21 August 1931 – 10 September 2017) was a Canadian rower. He competed at the 1952 Summer Olympics in Helsinki in the men's double sculls with Derek Riley where they were eliminated in the round one repechage.
