= Matt Barber (actor) =

English actor (born 1983)

- Born: Matthew Barber; 26 March 1983 (age 43); Hammersmith, London, England
- Education: Bradfield College (independent boarding school); Durham University; Bristol Old Vic Theatre School
- Occupation: Actor
- Years active: 2007–present

Matthew Barber (born 26 March 1983) is an English actor.

== Early life and education ==
Born in Hammersmith, London, he grew up in Hampshire, training classically as a chorister at Winchester Cathedral before receiving academic and music scholarships to Bradfield College, where he was head boy.

Barber read Classical Studies and Philosophy at St Cuthbert's Society, Durham, and graduated there in 2005.

He trained as an actor at the Bristol Old Vic Theatre School and finished in 2007.

== Career ==
He is best known for his role as Atticus Aldridge in Downton Abbey. His previous roles include Freddie Eynsford-Hill in Peter Hall's Pygmalion, opposite Michelle Dockery at the Old Vic, and internationally as Lysander in Jonathan Kent's The Fairy-Queen at Glyndebourne.

In 2011, he acted in Edward II, as the main character. Stet Journal said: "Barber is an excellent Edward – naive, excitable, and ultimately pitiable... mesmerising".

== Filmography ==
Year	Title	Role	Notes
2024	Dagr	Matt	
2018	The Sonata	James	
2014-2015	Downton Abbey	Atticus Aldridge	Season 5, 6 episodes
2014	Deadly Virtues: Love. Honour. Obey	Tom	
2013	Dracula	Campbell	2 episodes
2013	Plastic	Dave	
2012	The Other Wife	Ben	
2011	Bert and Dickie	Merv Wood	
2009	Being Human	Young Kemp	Season 2, episode 6
2009	The Alchemistic Suitcase	Youth	Short Film
2008	Vivaldi, The Red Priest	Francois	
2007	The Heart of Thomas Hardy	Alec D'Urberville	

=== Theatre ===
Year	Title	Role	Notes
2016	Breakfast at Tiffany’s	Fred	directed by Nikolai Foster (Curve, Leicester on 3 March 2016, UK & Ireland Tour, at the Haymarket Theatre in London’s West End from 30 June to 17 September 2016)
2013	Savage Beauty,	Paris (mythology)/Orestes/Jason/Oedipus	directed by James Albrecht (St James's Theatre)
2012	The Fairy-Queen	Lysander	directed by Jonathan Kent (director) (Glyndebourne)
2011	Portraits	Joe	directed by Alex Marker (Finborough Theatre)
2011	Edward II	Edward II	directed by Peter Darney (The Rose (theatre), Bankside)
2011	The Misanthrope	Acaste	directed by Andrew Hilton (Bristol Old Vic, 2011),
2009	Twelfth Night	Orsino (Twelfth Night)	directed by Andrew Normington (Birmingham Old Rep Theatre and International Tour)
2009	Human By Default	Simon	directed by Louisa Fitzgerald (Old Red Lion)
2008-2009	Pygmalion	Freddie Eynsford-Hill	directed by Peter Hall (director) (Old Vic, Bath Theatre Royal, 2008, and International Tour, 2009 2008)
2007	You Can't Take It with You,	Tony	directed by Gavin McAlinden (Southwark Playhouse, 2007)
?	Much Ado About Nothing	Claudio and Verges	directed by John Hartoch (RSC and Bristol Old Vic Theatre School)
