= Miguel Seijas =

Uruguayan rower (born 1930)

Olympic medal record

Men's rowing

Representing Uruguay
| Bronze medal – third place | 1952 Helsinki | Double sculls |

Miguel Ángel Seijas Cuestas (born 20 May 1930) is a retired rower from Uruguay who represented his country at the 1952 Summer Olympics in Helsinki, Finland. There he won the bronze medal with Juan Rodríguez in the men's doubles sculls event. Seijas also competed at the 1956 Summer Olympics. He was born in Montevideo.
