= Malvicino (surname) =

Malvicino is the surname of the following notable people:

- Ángel Malvicino (1921–2008), Argentine rower
- Angel P. Malvicino, former president of the Argentine football club Unión de Santa Fe
  - Estadio Ángel Malvicino
- Horacio Malvicino (born 1929), Argentine jazz and tango guitarist and composer
