= Christian Guilbert =

French rower (1928–2014)

Personal information
- Born: 3 January 1928 Joinville-le-Pont, France
- Died: 20 August 2014 (aged 86)
- Height: 185 cm (6 ft 1 in)
- Weight: 82 kg (181 lb)

Sport
- Sport: Rowing
Medal record
Men's rowing
Representing France
European Rowing Championships
Bronze medal – third place	1949 Amsterdam	Double sculls

Christian Guilbert (3 January 1928 – 20 August 2014) was a French rower. He competed at the 1948 Summer Olympics in London with the men's double sculls where they were eliminated in the semi-final.
