= Walter Hoover =

American rower (1934–2020)

Personal information
- Born: December 30, 1934 Lone Pine, California, United States
- Died: April 16, 2020 (aged 85)

Sport
- Sport: Rowing

Walter McCall Hoover, Jr. (December 30, 1934 – April 16, 2020) was an American rower. He competed in the men's double sculls event at the 1952 Summer Olympics.
