= Tranquilo Cappozzo =

Argentine rower

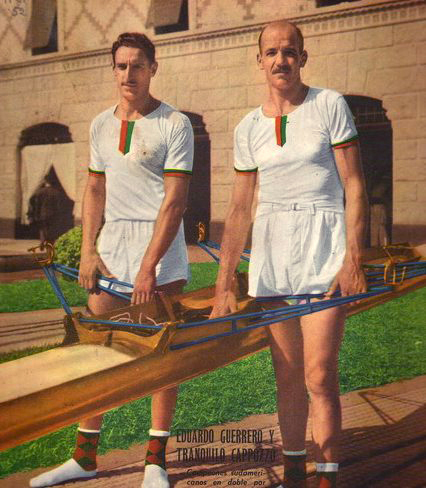
- Eduardo Guerrero (left) and Capozzo in 1952.

Personal information
- Nationality: American, Italian, Argentine
- Born: 25 January 1918 United States
- Died: 14 May 2003 (aged 85) Valle Hermoso, Argentina

Sport
- Country: Argentina
- Sport: Rowing
Medal record
Men's Rowing
Representing Argentina
| Gold medal – first place | 1952 Helsinki | Double Sculls |

Tranquilo Cappozzo Zironda (25 January 1918 – 14 May 2003) was a rower who represented Argentina in the 1948 and 1952 editions of the Summer Olympics, winning the gold medal in the latter.

== Biography ==
Capozzo was born in the United States to an Italian mother. He moved first to Italy and then to Argentina at the age of 18. He initially started out as a cyclist before falling in love with rowing. In 1948 he was eliminated in the semi-finals of the single sculls event. Four years later he won the gold medal in double sculls competition with Eduardo Guerrero. That was for 52 years the last gold medal at Olympics for Argentina until the victories of Soccer and Basketball men teams at the 2004 Summer Olympics. He died in Valle Hermoso, Córdoba Province, Argentina.
