= Henk van der Meer =

Dutch rower (1916–1985)

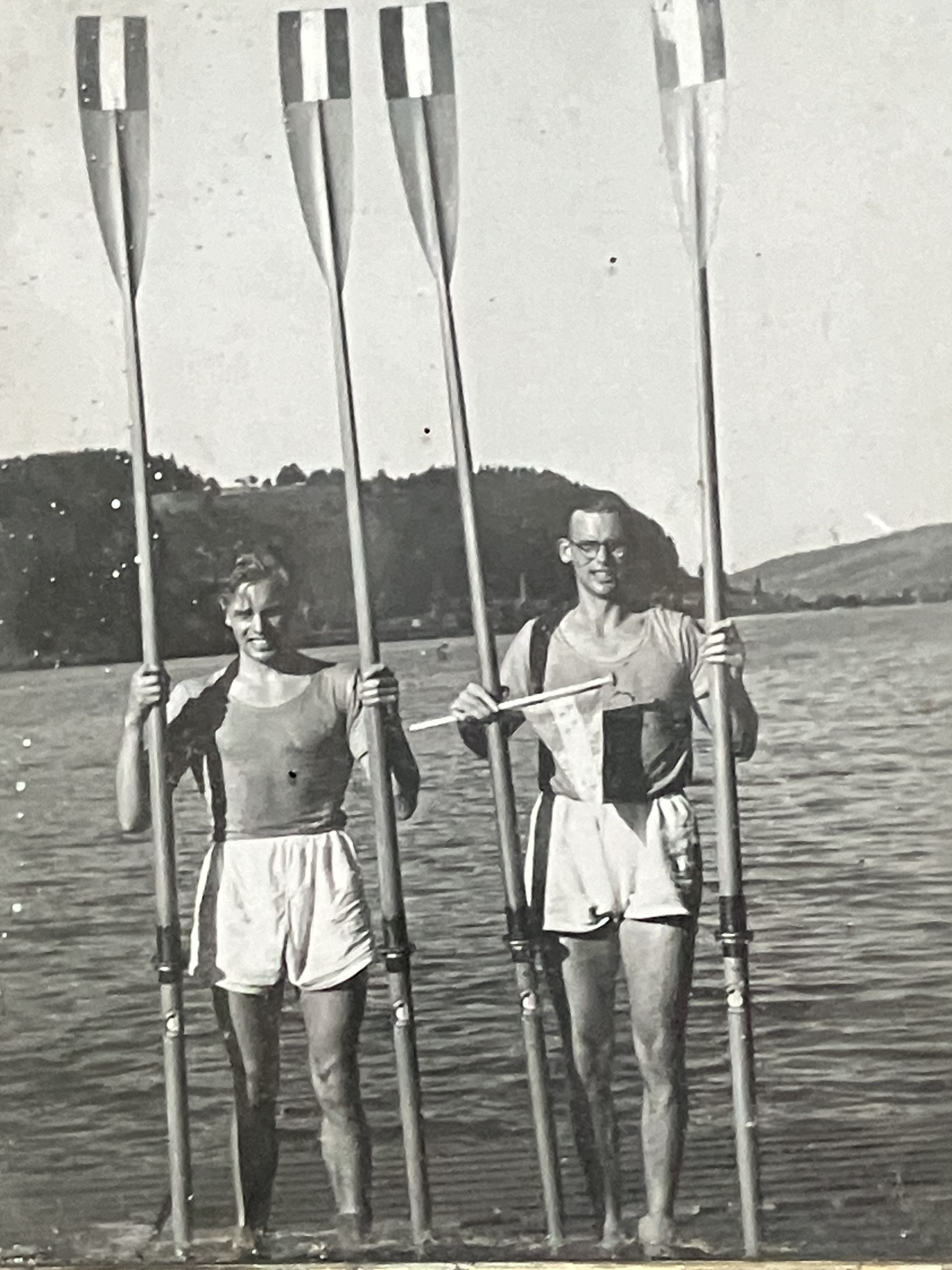
- Henk van der Meer and Tom Neumeier in 1947

Personal information
- Born: 12 January 1916 Heerhugowaard, the Netherlands
- Died: 25 April 1985 (aged 69)

Sport
- Sport: Rowing
Medal record
Men's rowing
Representing the Netherlands
European Rowing Championships
Gold medal – first place	1947 Lucerne	Double sculls

Hendrik van der Meer (12 January 1916 – 25 April 1985) was a Dutch rower who won the European title in the double scull event in 1947, together with Tom Neumeier. They also competed at the 1948 Summer Olympics in London in the men's double sculls where they were eliminated in the round one repêchage.
