= Gerhard Füssmann =

German rower

Personal information
- Nationality: German
- Born: 17 December 1928; Bamberg, Germany
- Died: 13 November 1993 (aged 64); Bamberg, Germany

Sport
- Sport: Rowing

Gerhard Füssmann (17 December 1928 – 13 November 1993) was a German rower. He competed in the men's double sculls event at the 1952 Summer Olympics.
