= John Rodgers (rower) =

Australian rower

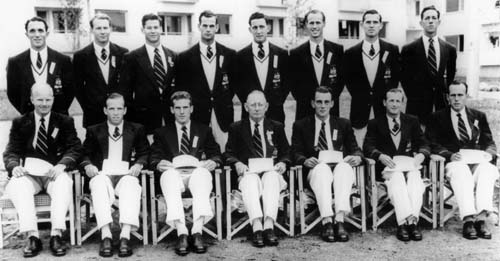
- Rodgers (back row 3rd from left) in the 1952 Olympic rowing squad

Personal information
- Full name: Alfred John Rodgers
- Born: 25 September 1930
- Died: 26 March 2016 (aged 85) Taren Point, New South Wales, Australia

Sport
- Sport: Rowing
- Club: Sydney Rowing Club
Medal record
Men's rowing
Representing Australia

A John Rodgers (25 September 1930 – 26 March 2016) was an Australian rower. He competed in the men's double sculls event at the 1952 Summer Olympics.

== Rowing career ==
Rodgers was born in Sydney. His senior rowing was from the Sydney Rowing Club.

Test races for selection prior to the 1952 Helsinki Olympics were held in Ballarat and Rodgers and Murray Riley won their right to compete at the Olympics. The placed 3rd in their heat, won their first repechage but were eliminated in a second repechage.

En route to the 1952 Helsinki Olympics the Australian men's squad raced three boats in Sydney Rowing Club colours at the 1952 Henley Royal Regatta. Members of the sweep squad raced an eight and were runners up in the Grand Challenge Cup. Merv Wood contested and won the Diamond Challenge Sculls while Rodgers and Riley contested and finished as runners up in the Double Sculls Challenge Cup.

In 1954 and 1955 Rodgers was selected in the New South Wales men's senior eights contesting the King's Cup at the Australian annual Interstate Regatta. In 1954 they took silver and in 1955, the bronze.
