= Francesco Dapiran =

Italian rower

Francesco Dapiran (15 December 1920 – 18 April 2015) was an Italian rower who competed at the 1948 Summer Olympics in London. He participated in the men's double sculls event with partner Mario Ustolin, but was eliminated in the semi-finals. Born in Rovinj (now part of Croatia), Dapiran began competing in 1936 and joined Nautica della Ginnastica Triestina in 1940 after moving to Trieste. During World War II he served with the Italian Navy and, upon his return, resumed his activities with Ginnastica Triestina. He retired from active competition following his Olympic appearance and began working as a coach with Circolo Canottieri Saturnia in 1949 where he donated his time until his death. He died on 18 April 2015 in Trieste, Italy.
