= Dagr (film) =

2024 British film by Matthew Butler-Hart

- Directed by: Matthew Butler-Hart
- Written by: Matthew Butler-Hart; Tori Butler-Hart
- Produced by: Matthew Butler-Hart; Tori Butler-Hart
- Starring: Riz Moritz; Ellie Duckles; Matt Barber; Tori Butler-Hart; Emma King
- Cinematography: Pete Wallington
- Edited by: William Honeyball
- Music by: Tom Kane
- Production companies: Fizz and Ginger Films
- Release date: February 9, 2024
- Running time: 77 minutes
- Country: United Kingdom
- Language: English

Dagr is a 2024 British found footage horror film directed and co-written by Matthew Butler-Hart.

== Plot ==
Thea and Louise are two friends who are known for their YouTube videos, where they film themselves stealing various items. They evade capture by obscuring their faces and justify themselves by stating that their thefts are an act of anti-consumerism and that they will give away any proceeds to charity. For their latest escapade the duo have decided to crash the film site for an artsy commercial in the countryside, where they will pose as caterers and steal whatever they can get their hands on. As this will be one of their largest heists ever, they will place cameras throughout the old manor house used for filming. The scenes of Thea and Louise driving to the house are interspersed with scenes of the film crew, made up of Emma, Matt, Grey, Tori, and Hattie, shooting footage before sending Hattie to fetch food and drink. The two YouTubers stop at a local store, where they learn that the village has a history of occult activity.

Once at the house the two set up cameras, during which Louise notices that something is wrong. They discover an iPad the crew was using to create a video journal for their client. The footage is initially benign, but quickly becomes disturbing, culminating in Emma accidentally stabbing Grey to death with a dagger discovered at the home. Refusing to see it as anything other than a prank or scripted footage for the commercial, Thea decides to go investigate sounds coming from upstairs. Louise continues to watch the footage, showing Matt becoming seemingly possessed before he too dies. While experiencing terrifying paranormal phenomena, Emma and Tori flee to an upstairs bedroom while a chanting robed figure chases them. A television in the room comes on and shows them old footage of an anthropology student who has come to the house to study its occult history, as its original owner was a druid who sacrificed women to gain power. The student is then slaughtered by a robed figure as the chanting grows louder, driving Emma to jump out of a window to her death. Louise also views footage showing that Thea was attacked by the robed figure and that the bodies of Matt and Grey have disappeared.

Realizing that Tori is still alive, Louise goes upstairs and the two women decide that they must attempt to flee the home. They are successful, but become separated in the woods surrounding the house. Tori is eventually captured by the figure and slaughtered. Louise continues running until she comes upon Thea, who is still alive as the druid intends on ritually sacrificing her. Aware that escape is impossible, Thea begs Louise to leave her. Her pleas are unsuccessful and the robed figure kills them both. The film ends with Hattie returning to the home with supplies, where she is also killed by the robed figure.

== Cast ==
- Riz Moritz as Louise
- Ellie Duckles as Thea
- Matt Barber as Matt
- Tori Butler-Hart as Tori
- Emma King as Emma
- Graham Butler as Gray
- Hattie Chapman as Hattie
- Luca Thompson as Ash Blake

== Release ==
The film was released in cinemas on 9 February 2024 and released on digital platforms on 2 April 2024.

== Reception ==
On review aggregator Rotten Tomatoes, the film holds an approval rating of 60% based on 5 reviews, with an average rating of 6.80/10. Jack Bottomley of Starburst Magazine called it as a "tense, slow-burning, slice of British folk horror".
