= Tori Butler-Hart =

English actress, writer and producer

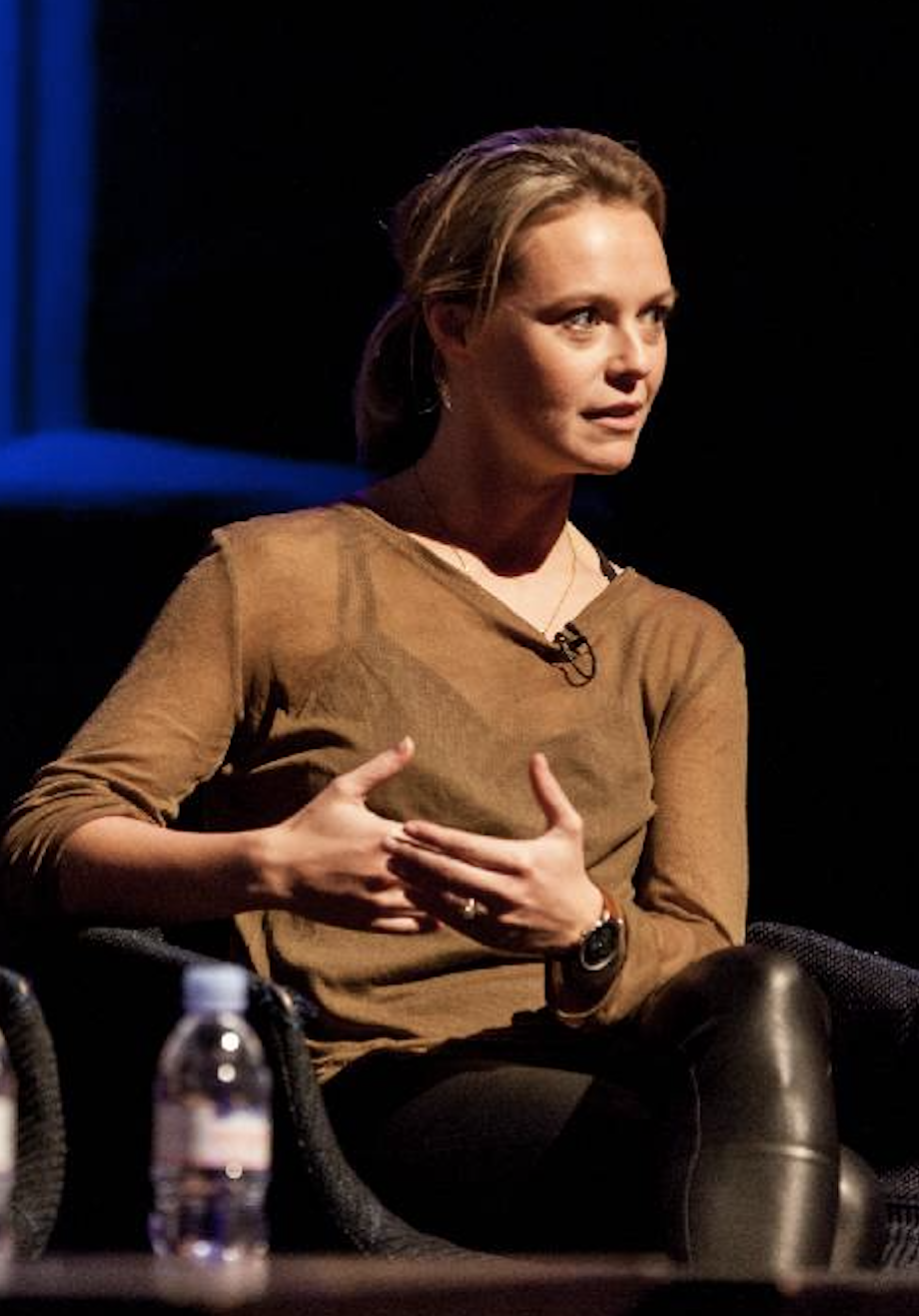
- Born: Oxford, England
- Occupations: Actress, writer, producer
- Spouse: Matthew Butler-Hart

Tori Butler-Hart is an English actress, writer and producer. She is best known for her work on the films, Infinitum: Subject Unknown, The Unfamiliar and The Isle.

Tori is the co-founder, along with her husband, Matthew Butler-Hart, of the Fizz and Ginger Films.

== Filmography ==
Year	Film	Writer	Producer	Note
2024	Dagr	Yes	Yes	Feature film
2021	Infinitum: Subject Unknown	Yes	Yes	Feature film
2020	The Unfamiliar		Yes	Feature film
2019	Real		Yes	Feature film
2018	Transference		Yes	Short film
2018	The Isle	Yes	Yes	Feature film
2015	Two Down	Yes	Yes	Feature film
2014	Miss in Her Teens	Yes	Yes	Feature film
2013	Things He Never Said		Yes	Short film
2012	The Humpersnatch Case	Yes	Yes	Short film
2011	Blog Off		Yes	Short film
2011	Claude et Claudette	Yes	Yes	Short film
2010	E'gad, Zombies!	Yes	Yes	Short film

=== As actress ===
- 2024 – Dagr
- 2021 – Infinitum: Subject Unknown
- 2020 – The Unfamiliar
- 2019 – Real
- 2018 – Transference
- 2018 – The Isle
- 2017 – The Forsaken
- 2017 – Edie
- 2017 – Suicide Feast
- 2016 – PHARE
- 2016 – Switch Off
- 2015 – Two Down
- 2014 – Keeping Rosy
- 2014 – Miss in Her Teens
- 2013 – Cracks
- 2012 – The Humpersnatch Case
- 2012 – The Academy: Special
- 2011 – Blog Off
- 2011 – Claude et Claudette
- 2010 – E'gad, Zombies!
- 2009–2013 – Doctors

== Publications ==
- 2021 - Full to the Brim with Fizz, Ginger, and Fierce Determination ISBN 978-1-4930512-9-8

== Awards and nominations ==
Year	Result	Award	Category	Work	Ref.
2020	Nominated	National Film Awards UK	Best Thriller	The Isle	
2018	Won	London Independent Film Festival	Best Horror Film	The Isle	
2015	Nominated	Maverick Movie Awards	Best Director	Two Down	
