= Teodoro Nölting =

Argentine rower

Personal information
- Born: 15 October 1917; Tigre, Argentina
- Died: 30 April 1976; Monte Grande, Argentina

Sport
- Sport: Rowing

Teodoro Nölting (born 15 October 1917 – 30 April 1976) was an Argentine rower. He competed in the men's double sculls event at the 1948 Summer Olympics.
