= Sándor Ormándi =

Hungarian rower

Personal information
- Nationality: Hungarian
- Born: 7 February 1922; Aba, Hungary
- Died: 13 September 2006 (aged 84)

Sport
- Sport: Rowing

Sándor Ormándi (7 February 1922 – 13 September 2006) was a Hungarian rower. He competed in the men's double sculls event at the 1948 Summer Olympics.
