= Sam Hoare (actor) =

British actor (born 1981)

- Born: Simon Patrick Douro Hoare; 27 June 1981 (age 45)
- Education: Eton College
- Alma mater: University of Edinburgh
- Occupations: Actor, director, writer
- Years active: 2006–present
- Known for: Dickie Burnell, in Bert & Dickie
- Spouse: Romola Garai (m. 2014)
- Children: 2

Simon Patrick Douro Hoare (born 27 June 1981), known by the stage-name Sam Hoare, is a British actor, director and writer known for his role as rower Dickie Burnell, alongside Matt Smith, in the BBC One Olympic drama Bert and Dickie (2012).

Hoare wrote and directed his début feature film, Having You, which premièred in May 2013 on Sky Movies.

== Early life and education ==
Born Simon Patrick Douro Hoare, he is the son of the late Timothy James Douro Hoare and his former wife "Linda" Kinvara Cayzer, the granddaughter of Herbert Cayzer, 1st Baron Rotherwick. Hoare was educated at Eton College, and then read Philosophy and Psychology at the University of Edinburgh, where he performed in a number of plays at the student theatre.

== Acting career ==
Hoare went on to perform on stage, including productions at the Chichester Theatre, Shakespeare's Globe and The Theatre Royal Haymarket, for a 6-month run of Breakfast at Tiffany's directed by Sean Mathias. Alongside his theatrical and TV appearances, including EastEnders and Doctors, Hoare appeared in films; with Nicole Kidman in The Golden Compass and Samuel L. Jackson in Captain America: The First Avenger.

After his role in Bert & Dickie in 2012, Hoare guest-starred in BBC One's Father Brown and in Stephen Poliakoff's BBC2 drama Dancing on the Edge, as well as a comedy lead in Blandings for BBC One, based on the celebrated stories of P.G. Wodehouse; also starring Jennifer Saunders, Timothy Spall, David Walliams and Paloma Faith.

Hoare played the role of production assistant Douglas Camfield in the BBC drama An Adventure in Space and Time to celebrate the 50th Anniversary of Doctor Who.

== As director and writer ==
Hoare has directed a number of music videos and two short films; Training Day which was accepted into several major festivals including the Rushes Soho Shorts Festival and the Encounters International Film Festival; and more recently, Babysitting starring Romola Garai, Dan Stevens and Imogen Stubbs.

== Personal life ==
In March 2013, his partner actress Romola Garai gave birth to their daughter. Hoare and Garai married in July 2014.

== Filmography ==
=== Film ===
Year	Title	Role	Notes
2007	The Golden Compass	Second in Command	
2008	Lecture 21	Musician	
2011	Captain America: The First Avenger	Nervous Recruit	
2013	Having You	—N/a	Writer and director
2014	Keeping Rosy	Tom	
2015	Solitary	James	
2015	Legend	Stefan De Faye	
2015	The Program	Stephen Swart	
2018	The Mercy	Mr. Hughes	
2018	Hurricane	Kellett	
2023	Club Zero	Fred's Father	
2025	Palestine 36	Diplomat Charles	
2025	Hedda	Detective Logan	

=== Television ===
Year	Title	Role	Notes
2006	Jane Eyre	Lynn Brother	4 episodes
2007	Lilies	Peter Parks	Episode: "The Release"
2007	Party Animals	Tom Merchant	Episode #1.5
2008	Summerhill	Phil	Television film
2008, 2011	Doctors	Gavin Peterson / Glen Newman	2 episodes
2009	EastEnders	Kieran	1 episode
2010	Borgen	Engelsk analytiker No. 2	Episode: "Dyden i midten"
2012	Bert and Dickie	Richard "Dickie" Burnell	Television film
2013	Father Brown	Norman Bohun	Episode: "The Hammer of God"
2013	Blandings	Rupert Bingham	Episode: "Company for Gertrude"
2013	Dancing on the Edge	Eric	3 episodes
2013	An Adventure in Space and Time	Douglas Camfield	Television film
2015	Life in Squares	Young Clive Bell	2 episodes
2016	Beowulf: Return to the Shieldlands	Rowan	Episode #1.5
2016	Dickensian	Matthew Pocket	6 episodes
2016	Plebs	Sebastus	Episode: "The Cupid"
2016	National Treasure	Tom	Episode #1.1
2016	Dark Angel	James Robinson	2 episodes
2017	Endeavour	Dr. Tristan Berger	Episode: "Harvest"
2017	Grantchester	Mark Davies	Episode #3.6
2017	Delicious	Harry	Episode: "Secrets of the Father"
2017, 2024	Outlander	Lord Hal Melton / Harold 'Hal' Grey	3 episodes
2018	McMafia	Alan Reynott	2 episodes
2018	Death in Paradise	Daniel Friend	Episode: "Meditated in Murder"
2019	Traitors	Neville	3 episodes
2019	Knightfall	Gabriel	2 episodes
2019	Pennyworth	Ian Thurso	Episode: "Martha Kane"
2019	Carnival Row	Leslie Boythorne	Episode: "Unaccompanied Fae"
2020	The English Game	—N/a	Writer of "Episode 4"
2021	Wolfe	Darren Belby	Episode #1.1
2021	Showtrial	Adam Reynolds	4 episodes
2021	The Girl Before	Charlie	Episode #1.1
2022	The Ex-Wife	Johnny	2 episodes
2022	Miss Scarlet and The Duke	Arthur St John Hudson	2 episodes
2022–present	The Capture	Ed Polczynski	4 episodes
2023	Dalgliesh	Maximillian Howarth	2 episodes
2023	The Castaways	Pete	3 episodes
2023–present	Grace	ACC Cassian Pewe	10 episodes
2025	Playing Nice	Mr. Kelly	2 episodes
2025	King & Conqueror	—N/a	Writer of "So Be It"
2026	Rivals	—N/a	Writer of "Episode 5" (series 2)
