= Peter Brandt =

British rower (1931–2022)

Personal information
- Birth name: Peter Augustus Brandt
- Nationality: British
- Born: 2 July 1931; Marylebone, London, England
- Died: 28 April 2022 (aged 90)

Sport
- Sport: Rowing

Peter Augustus Brandt (2 July 1931 – 28 April 2022) was a British rower. He competed in the men's double sculls event at the 1952 Summer Olympics. His rowing partner was John MacMillan and they were eliminated in the first repechage.

Brandt died on 28 April 2022, at the age of 90.
