= Having You =

- Directed by: Sam Hoare
- Written by: Sam Hoare
- Produced by: Lucan Toh and Oliver Roskill
- Starring: Anna Friel; Romola Garai; Andrew Buchan; Phil Davis; Harry Hadden-Paton
- Cinematography: Kate Reid
- Edited by: Dan Sherwen
- Music by: Bjarni Margeirsson
- Production company: Wigwam Films
- Release date: 4 June 2013
- Running time: 91 minutes
- Country: United Kingdom
- Language: English

Having You is a 2013 British drama film directed and written by Sam Hoare. The film stars Anna Friel, Romola Garai, Andrew Buchan, Phil Davis and Harry Hadden-Paton.

== Plot summary ==
An easy going young man named Jack, a bit of a directionless 'lost-soul' and previous hedonistic 'wild-child' alcoholic (and unfortunate believer that most he's attempted in life he's failed at miserably) is attempting to, on this his seventh straight year of sobriety, straighten out his life once and for all by taking his relationship in a more serious direction with a proposal of marriage. He's living with his partner Camilla, an assertive aspiring young doctor who is pretty much the driving force (not to mention, main financial supporter) of their otherwise contented life together. And even though he lives in a house bought and paid for by Camilla's wealthy father, still Jack struggles to afford an engagement ring to go with the very proposal he's just sprung on his tearfully accepting now fiancée. Camilla not only jumps straight into reception planning, but having previously suffered a problematic miscarriage, pregnancy preoccupation and planning has shot to the top of her priorities list. Jack, though terrified at the idea of becoming a father, is nevertheless even more fearful of losing the only thing truly stable and loving in his life, so silently acquiesces to his fiancée's wishes. Little does he know just how much his life is about to change when he answers the door to someone he doesn't immediately recognise, but who certainly seems to know him.

The incessant ringer at the door is Anna (Anna Friel). Soon, Jack is reminded that Anna is someone he drunkenly hooked-up with at some concert 8 years previously - a one-night stand as it happens - and informs him that they have a seven-year-old son called Phoenix. At first Jack is rude and dismissive, clutching at denials and misremembered snippets of having worn a condom. But Anna's insistence on a paternity test soon sets him on the right path to accept and meet his son. Jack begins to spend time with Phoenix but is reluctant to tell Camilla about everything that has been going on, unsure how to juggle both sides of his life at once. Meanwhile, Camilla's meticulous ovulation tracking soon means that Jack is about to be father for a second time. Fearful of losing out, Jack mishandles the situation by not being honest with either party. Camilla however soon finds out the truth when Phoenix needs to be rushed to the hospital she's working at after a nasty fall from a jungle-gym at the playground during one of their weekly visits. Consequently, feeling lied to and betrayed, Camilla kicks Jack out the house, cancels their wedding plans and wants nothing to do with him. Jack is devastated and attempts to explain and set things right, but ultimately understands that the right choice is actually making his son his priority and to just give the situation some time.

Later, it is revealed that Anna has a terminal illness (ovarian cancer) and that Anna's awareness of doomed fate is what prompted her to seek out Jack in the first place. In order that Phoenix not be left alone in the world after such a traumatic event as losing his mother, she asks Jack to promise to care for Phoenix as he'll be needing his father more than ever once she's gone - which Jack immediately agrees and promises to do. In the end, Anna dies and Phoenix goes to live with Jack, who eventually makes things right with Camilla too. The film ends just before Camilla is due to give birth to their baby. But it's implied that the four will go on to heal and grow into one happy family together, finally having all they wished for at the beginning of the film.

== Cast ==
- Anna Friel as Anna
- Romola Garai as Camilla
- Andrew Buchan as Jack
- Phil Davis as Peter
- Harry Hadden-Paton as Barry
- Isaac Andrews as Phoenix
- Steven Cree as Paul
- Hattie Morahan as Lucy
