= Jos Van Stichel =

Belgian rower (1928–2003)

Personal information
- Nationality: Belgian
- Born: Joseph Ludovic Van Stichel; 7 February 1928 Antwerp, Belgium
- Died: 18 April 2003 (aged 75) Antwerp, Belgium

Sport
- Sport: Rowing

Joseph Ludovic Van Stichel (7 February 1928 – 18 April 2003) was a Belgian rower. He competed in the men's double sculls event at the 1952 Summer Olympics. Van Stichel died in Antwerp on 18 April 2003, at the age of 75.
