= Tore Johansson (rower) =

Swedish rower

Personal information
- Born: Tore Sune Torvald Johansson; 19 October 1920 Vaxholm, Sweden
- Died: 5 April 2002 (aged 81)

Sport
- Sport: Rowing
Medal record
Men's rowing
Representing Sweden
European Rowing Championships
Bronze medal – third place	1951 Mâcon	Double sculls

Tore Sune Torvald Johansson (19 October 1920 – 5 April 2002) was a Swedish rower. He competed at the 1952 Summer Olympics in Helsinki with the men's double sculls where they were eliminated in the round one repêchage.
