= Lodovico Sommaruga =

Italian rower (1928–2016)

Personal information
- Born: 7 May 1928 Milan, Kingdom of Italy
- Died: 23 July 2016 (aged 88) Milan, Italy

Sport
- Sport: Rowing
Medal record
Men's rowing
Representing Italy
European Rowing Championships
Silver medal – second place	1950 Milan	Double sculls

Lodovico Sommaruga (7 May 1928 – 23 July 2016) was an Italian rower. He competed at the 1952 Summer Olympics in Helsinki with the men's double sculls where they were eliminated in the semi-final repêchage.
