= Joe Angyal =

American rower (1916–1954)

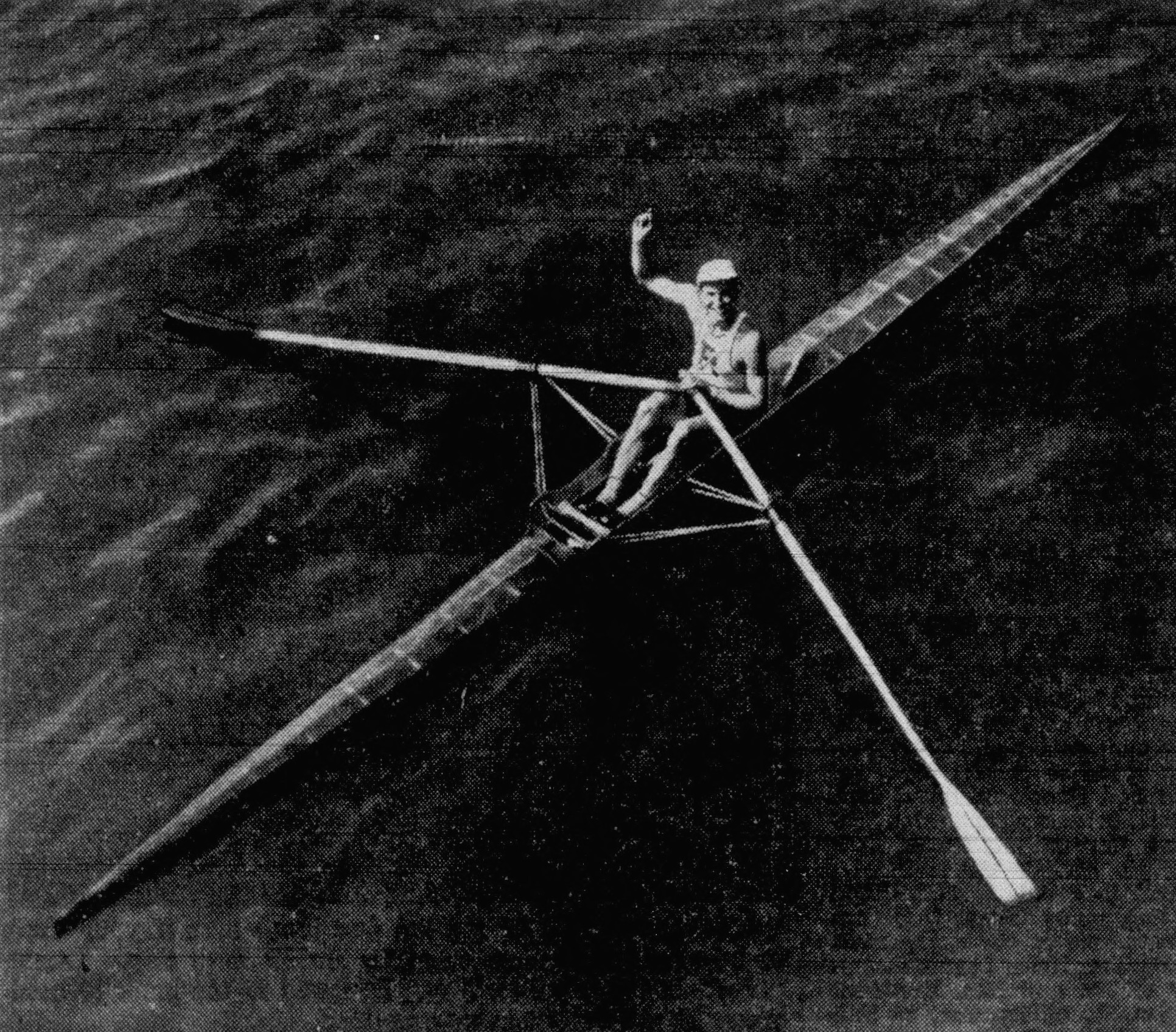
- Angyal, c. 1942

Personal information
- Full name: Joseph Angyal Jr.
- Born: December 6, 1916 New York City, U.S.
- Died: June 26, 1954 (aged 37) New York City, U.S.

Sport
- Sport: Rowing

Joseph Angyal Jr. (December 6, 1916 – June 26, 1954) was an American rower. He competed in the men's double sculls event at the 1948 Summer Olympics. A Marine Corps fighter pilot in World War II and reservist, Angyal was killed in 1954 when he crashed a jet fighter on Long Island.
