= Andrew Buchan =

British actor (born 1979)

- Born: Andrew Neil Buchan; 1979 (age 46–47); Stockport, England
- Education: St Cuthbert's Society, Durham; RADA
- Occupation: Actor
- Years active: 2005–present
- Spouse: Amy Nuttall (m. 2012; sep. 2022)
- Children: 2

Andrew Neil Buchan (born 1979) is an English actor and writer. He is known for his roles as DI James Marsh in the ITV drama Code of Silence (2025), Mark Latimer in the ITV drama Broadchurch (2013–17), Scott Foster in the BBC political drama Party Animals (2007), John Mercer in ITV drama series The Fixer (2008–09), and William Garrow in BBC period drama Garrow's Law (2009–11).

== Early life and education ==
He was born in 1979 in Stockport and brought up in the suburb of Lostock, Bolton. His father is Scottish-born.

He attended the nearby Rivington and Blackrod High School, where he was head boy during sixth form years in Horwich. During A-Levels, Buchan worked for Granada Studios as a tour guide, using amusing, unconventional methods to keep tourists interested. He also worked as a barman at Manchester Airport, and as a concierge at the De Vere Whites hotel in Reebok Stadium.

In 2001 Buchan graduated from St Cuthbert's Society, Durham University with a Bachelor of Arts in Modern Languages. He then trained at the Royal Academy of Dramatic Art.

== Career ==
On stage Buchan has appeared as Mercutio in Romeo and Juliet at the Royal Exchange Theatre, Manchester (2005). In 2008, he played David in Arthur Miller's The Man Who Had All the Luck at Donmar Warehouse. The play ran for six weeks in London, before going on a short UK tour. Buchan was named Best Actor in a Touring Production by the Manchester Evening News Theatre Awards. In 2011, he returned to the Donmar to play Bolingbroke in Shakespeare's Richard II.

His career in television began when he appeared as the vicar, St. John Rivers, in the 2006 Jane Eyre and then as the regular character Scott Foster alongside Matt Smith in the political drama Party Animals. In 2007, he appeared as Jem Hearne in the award-winning Cranford, in a cast that included Judi Dench, Imelda Staunton and Eileen Atkins. Also in 2007, he appeared as the teacher Sean Knowles, with Richard Coyle and Indira Varma in ITV's The Whistleblowers. In 2008, he appeared in the fourth season premiere of Bones as Dr. Ian Wexler.

In 2008 and 2009 he starred in the ITV1 drama The Fixer as the lead role, John Mercer, a paid assassin targeting people who have escaped the law. The first season of The Fixer received a Royal Television Society award for Best Series. In 2009, he appeared as Fishwick in the John Lennon biopic Nowhere Boy acting opposite Kristin Scott Thomas, and directed by Sam Taylor-Wood. In the BBC's Garrow's Law, he starred in the leading role as William Garrow. Series 1 started on BBC One on 1 November 2009, and continued for two more series. In December 2009, he appeared again as the carpenter Jem Hearne in the BBC's two-part Cranford Christmas Special.

In 2010 Buchan appeared as journalist and love interest Billy Marshall in the made-for-TV movie Abroad, based in part on the true-life experiences of Toronto's Globe and Mail columnist and author, Leah McLaren. This movie was broadcast in Canada on CBC TV on 14 March 2010. In 2010, he appeared as Joseph in the BBC's The Nativity. In January 2011, he played Thomas Mortimer in The Sinking of the Laconia, a dramatisation of the Laconia incident on BBC Television.

In 2013 he starred in multi-award-winning ITV drama, Broadchurch, as Mark Latimer, father of the murdered boy Danny Latimer. For this role he was awarded the best supporting actor "Dagger" at the Crime Thriller Awards 2013. The immediate ratings success of Broadchurch led to Andrew, with co-star Jodie Whittaker, being invited to present a TV BAFTA at the awards ceremony in May 2013. That same month his film, Having You, was premiered on Sky Movies. Buchan played the lead character Jack, alongside Romola Garai as his girlfriend, and Anna Friel as a one-night stand from his past.

2013 also saw the release of multi-award-winning independent film Still Life, in which Andrew took a cameo role alongside Eddie Marsan. Later the same year, Buchan produced and starred in film short, 1946, based on the life of Hollywood actor, Jimmy Stewart. The film won the Award of Distinction at the 2014 Williamsburg Independent Film Festival.

In July 2014 Buchan starred alongside Maggie Gyllenhaal in Hugo Blick's political thriller The Honourable Woman. This was broadcast on both BBC2 in the UK and the Sundance channel in the US. In October 2014, he starred in ITV's The Great Fire, portraying Thomas Farriner, the baker from Pudding Lane.

In 2015 it was announced that Buchan was cast as the lead role in TNT drama pilot Home alongside Bethany Joy Lenz. Home was not subsequently serialised.

Buchan played the wizard, The Great Zambini, the dramatisation of Jasper Fforde's fantasy novel The Last Dragonslayer, which premiered on Sky One on Christmas Day 2016. The following Christmas saw the release of Ridley Scott's All the Money in the World, the story of the kidnap of John Paul Getty III, grandson of billionaire John Paul Getty. Buchan played John Paul Getty II, father of the kidnapped boy.

In February 2018, Buchan played a cameo role in James Marsh's The Mercy – a BBC film about ill-fated 1960s yachtsman Donald Crowhurst, featuring Colin Firth and Rachel Weisz in the lead roles. Later that year he played as Henri Matisse in National Geographic's 2nd season series Genius: Picasso, playing alongside Antonio Banderas and Clémence Poésy. At Christmas 2018, he starred in Agatha Christie's The ABC Murders, as Franklin Clarke, alongside John Malkovich as Hercule Poirot.

In 2019 Buchan featured in the third and fourth series of The Crown, as Andrew Parker-Bowles, a friend and a rival of royal family members. He appeared in two films: Intrigo: Samaria alongside Phoebe Fox and Millie Brady and Baghdad in My Shadow by Swiss/Iraqi filmmaker Samir, alongside Zahraa Ghandour.

In addition to stage, television and film, Buchan has built up an extensive voice acting catalogue. He has appeared in BBC Radio drama, Dickens Confidential, and radio dramatisations of Therese Raquin and The Great Gatsby. He has read prose and poetry on BBC Radio for Words and Music: Law and Order and Ave Maria, as well as featuring in online role-playing games, audio books, advert voice-overs, and narrating TV documentaries and reality-competition shows, such as Britain's Best Home Cook and The Dog House (TV series).

== Personal life ==
Buchan married his long-term girlfriend, actress Amy Nuttall, on 8 September 2012, not far from their respective childhood homes in Lancashire, England. They have two children, a daughter and a son. In February 2023, it was reported Nuttall and Buchan had split up before Christmas, as Buchan had started an affair with Leila Farzad. Later reports suggest the two have reconciled.

== Filmography ==
=== Film ===
Year	Title	Role	Notes
2007	The Deaths of Ian Stone	Ryan	
2009	Bear That Broke	—N/a	Short film. Writer, director & producer
2009	Nowhere Boy	Fishwick	
2012	Whitelands	Connor	Short film
2013	Having You	Jack	
2013	Still Life	Mr. Pratchett, Council Manager	
2014	1946	James Stewart	Short film
2017	All the Money in the World	John Paul Getty Jr.	
2017	The Mercy	Ian Milburn	
2019	Baghdad in My Shadow	Martin Hartman	
2019	Intrigo: Samaria	Henry Martens	
2024	Apartment 7A	Leo Watts	

=== Television ===
Year	Title	Role	Notes
2006	If I Had You	Marcus	Television film
2006	Jane Eyre	St. John Rivers	Miniseries (1 episode)
2007	Party Animals	Scott Foster	8 episodes
2007	The Whistleblowers	Sean Knowles	Episode 3: "No Child Left Behind"
2007–2009	Cranford	Jem Hearne	Series 1 & 2 (6 episodes)
2008	Bones	Dr. Ian Wexler	Season 4; episode 1: "Yanks in the U.K.: Parts 1 & 2"
2008–2009	The Fixer	John Mercer	Series 1 & 2 (12 episodes)
2009–2011	Garrow's Law	William Garrow	Series 1–3 (12 episodes)
2010	Abroad	Billy Marshall	Television film
2010	Coming Up	Ben	Series 8; episode 6: "Eclipse"
2010	The Nativity	Joseph	Miniseries (4 episodes)
2011	The Sinking of the Laconia	Thomas Mortimer	Miniseries (2 episodes)
2011	The Fades	Mark	Pilot
2013–2017	Broadchurch	Mark Latimer	Series 1–3 (24 episodes)
2014	The Honourable Woman	Ephra Stein	Miniseries (7 episodes)
2014	The Great Fire	Thomas Farriner	Miniseries (4 episodes)
2016	Home	Joe	Television film
2016	The Last Dragonslayer	The Great Zambini	Television film
2018	Genius	Henri Matisse	Series 2 (3 episodes)
2018	The ABC Murders	Franklin Clarke	Miniseries (3 episodes)
2019–2020	The Crown	Andrew Parker Bowles	Series 3 & 4 (4 episodes)
2020	Alex Rider	Ian Rider	Series 1 (2 episodes)
2020	The Spanish Princess	Thomas More	Series 2 (8 episodes)
2020–2022	Industry	Felim Bichan	Series 1 & 2 (6 episodes)
2021–2022	COBRA	Chris Edwards	Series 2 (5 episodes)
2022	This England	Matt Hancock	Miniseries (6 episodes)
2023	Better	Col McHugh	Main role; 5 episodes
2023	Carnival Row	Mikulas Vir	Season 2 (7 episodes)
2024	Passenger	—N/a	6 episodes. Creator, writer & associate producer
2024	Black Doves	Wallace Webb	Series 1 (6 episodes)
2025	Code of Silence	DI James Marsh	6 episodes

=== Video games ===
Year	Title	Role	Notes
2010	Fable III	The Gnomes (voice)	Credited as Andy Buchan
2011	The Last Story	Lazulis Knight (voice)	Credited as Andy Buchan
2011	Warhammer 40,000: Space Marine	Dominus (voice)	
2012	Fable: The Journey	Finley (voice)	
2025	Warhammer 40,000: Space Marine – Master Crafted Edition	Dominus (voice)	

== Stage ==
Year	Title	Role	Notes
2005	Romeo and Juliet	Mercutio	Royal Exchange, Manchester
2008	The Man Who Had All the Luck		Donmar Warehouse, London / UK tour
2011–2012	Richard II	Bolingbroke	Donmar Warehouse, London

== Awards and nominations ==
Year	Award	Category	Work	Result	Ref.
2010	Manchester Evening News Theatre Awards	Best Actor in a Touring Production	The Man Who Had All the Luck	Won	
2011	Gemini Awards	Best Leading Actor in a Dramatic Program or Mini-Series	The Nativity	Nominated	
2013	Crime Thriller Awards	Best Supporting Actor	Broadchurch	Won	
2014	Leeds International Film Festival	Best British Short	1946	Nominated	(Note: Shared with Robert Ford.)
