= Arthur Gallagher =

American rower

Personal information
- Born: July 5, 1918 New York, New York, United States
- Died: January 12, 1996 (aged 77) Wayne, Pennsylvania, United States

Sport
- Sport: Rowing

Arthur Gallagher (July 5, 1918 – January 12, 1996) was an American rower. He competed in the men's double sculls event at the 1948 Summer Olympics.
