= Maurice Matthey =

Swiss rower (1923–1998)

Personal information
- Full name: Maurice Louis Matthey
- Nationality: Swiss
- Born: 16 April 1923 Neuchâtel, Switzerland
- Died: 23 May 1998 (aged 75)

Sport
- Sport: Rowing

Maurice Louis Matthey (16 April 1923 – 23 May 1998) was a Swiss rower. He competed in the men's double sculls event at the 1948 Summer Olympics. Matthey died on 23 May 1998, at the age of 75.
