= József Simó =

Hungarian rower (1925–1950)

Personal information
- Nationality: Hungarian
- Born: 1925 Budapest, Hungary
- Died: 24 September 1950 (aged 24–25) Siófok, Hungary

Sport
- Sport: Rowing

József Simó (1925 – 24 September 1950) was a Hungarian rower. He competed in the men's double sculls event at the 1948 Summer Olympics. Simó died in Siófok on 24 September 1950.
