= Infinitum: Subject Unknown =

2021 British film

- Directed by: Matthew Butler-Hart
- Written by: Matthew Butler-Hart; Tori Butler-Hart
- Produced by: Matthew Butler-Hart; Tori Butler-Hart
- Starring: Ian McKellen; Conleth Hill; Tori Butler-Hart; Wendy Muir Hart
- Cinematography: Matthew Butler-Hart
- Edited by: William Honeyball
- Music by: Tom Kane
- Production companies: Fizz and Ginger Films
- Release date: 22 March 2021
- Running time: 88 minutes
- Country: United Kingdom
- Language: English

Infinitum: Subject Unknown is a 2021 British science fiction film directed by Matthew Butler-Hart. It stars Tori Butler-Hart, Ian McKellen and Conleth Hill. The film was shot entirely on the iPhone during the UK’s first lockdown.

== Plot ==
Jane is trapped in an experiment in a parallel universe and is forced to find a way to alter her reality before she is lost forever, with clues pointing to a Professor Aaron Östergaard and Dr. Charles Marland-White.

== Cast ==
- Tori Butler-Hart as Jane
- Ian McKellen as Dr. Charles Marland-White
- Conleth Hill as Professor Aaron Östergaard
- Wendy Muir Hart as Wytness scientist
- Christopher Hart as Wytness scientist
- Matthew Butler-Hart as Case Watch Agent

== Reception ==
On Rotten Tomatoes, the film has an approval rating of 75% based on 8 reviews, with an average rating of 6.20/10.
