= Waldemar Beck =

German rower

Personal information
- Nationality: German
- Born: 14 March 1921; Fürth, Germany
- Died: 4 June 2014 (aged 93); Bamberg, Germany

Sport
- Sport: Rowing

Waldemar Beck (14 March 1921 – 4 June 2014) was a German rower. He competed in the men's double sculls event at the 1952 Summer Olympics.
