= Antonín Malinkovič =

Czechoslovak rower

Personal information
- Born: 13 August 1930 Charvátská Nová Ves (now part of Břeclav), Czechoslovakia
- Died: 15 September 2016 (aged 86)

Sport
- Sport: Rowing

Antonín Malinkovič (13 August 1930 – 15 September 2016) was a Czechoslovak rower. He competed at the 1952 Summer Olympics in Helsinki with the men's double sculls where they came fifth.
