= Jiří Vykoukal (rower) =

Czech rower

Personal information
- Nationality: Czech
- Born: 29 July 1922; Napajedla, Czechoslovakia
- Died: 2 June 1974 (aged 51); Napajedla, Czechoslovakia

Sport
- Sport: Rowing

Jiří Vykoukal (29 July 1922 – 2 June 1974) was a Czech rower. He competed in the men's double sculls event at the 1952 Summer Olympics.
