= William Jones (rower) =

Uruguayan rower (1924–2014)

Medal record

Men's rowing

Representing Uruguay

Olympic Games
Bronze medal – third place	1948 London	Double sculls

William Jones (6 December 1924 – 7 August 2014) was a Uruguayan rower who competed in the 1948 Summer Olympics. In 1948 he won the bronze medal with his partner Juan Rodríguez in the double sculls event. He died in his sleep at his residence in Inverness, Florida, at the age of 89 on 7 August 2014.
