= Eduardo Guerrero (rower) =

Argentine rower (1928–2015)

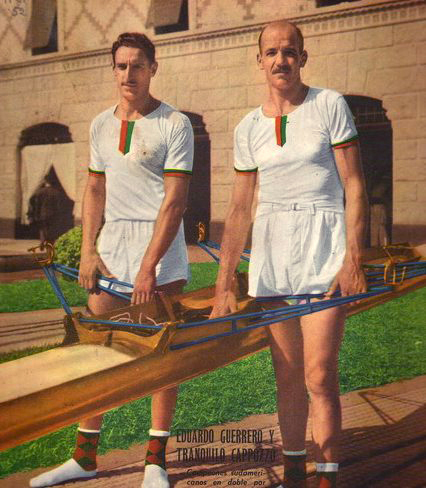
- Guerrero (left) and Tranquilo Cappozzo in 1952

Personal information
- Born: 4 March 1928 Salto, Buenos Aires, Argentina
- Died: 17 August 2015 (aged 87) Buenos Aires, Argentina
Medal record
Men's rowing
Representing Argentina
Olympic Games
Gold medal – first place	1952 Helsinki	Double Sculls

Eduardo Guerrero (4 March 1928 – 17 August 2015) was an Argentine rower and Olympic champion, who competed in the 1952 Summer Olympics.

He was born in Salto, Buenos Aires Province.

Guerrero participated in the 1952 Summer Olympics in Helsinki where he won gold medal in double sculls competition together with Tranquilo Cappozzo. That was for 52 years the last gold medal at Olympics for Argentina until the victories of Soccer and Basketball men teams in 2004 games.

He also competed in Rugby for the French Sports Club, and was the founder and director of the Museo Olímpico Rodante. In 2002, Guerrero paddled along the Parana River from Puerto Iguazu to Buenos Aires.

Guerrero died on 17 August 2015 at the age of 87.
