= Matthew Butler-Hart =

English film director

- Born: Shropshire, England
- Occupations: Director, writer, producer, actor
- Years active: 1998–present
- Spouse: Tori Butler-Hart

Matthew Butler-Hart is an English film director, writer and actor. He is best known for his work on the films, The Isle and Infinitum: Subject Unknown.

== Career ==
Matthew is the co-founder, along with his wife, Tori Butler-Hart, of the Fizz and Ginger Films.

== Filmography ==
Year	Film	Director	Writer	Producer	Note
2024	Dagr	Yes	Yes	Yes	Feature film
2021	Infinitum: Subject Unknown	Yes	Yes	Yes	Feature film
2019	Real			Yes	Feature film
2018	The Isle	Yes	Yes	Yes	Feature film
2015	Two Down	Yes	Yes	Yes	Feature film
2014	Miss in Her Teens	Yes	Yes		Feature film
2012	The Humpersnatch Case	Yes	Yes	Yes	Short film
2011	Blog Off	Yes	Yes		Short film
2011	Claude et Claudette	Yes	Yes	Yes	Short film
2010	E'gad, Zombies!	Yes	Yes	Yes	Short film
2010	The Symmetry of Love			Yes	Feature film
2009	A Cambridge Tale	Yes	Yes		Short film

=== As actor ===
- 2021 – Infinitum: Subject Unknown
- 2018 – Transference
- 2017 – Suicide Feast
- 2015 – Drunk on Love
- 2015 – Two Down
- 2014 – Miss in Her Teens
- 2012 – The Humpersnatch Case
- 2011 – Blog Off
- 2011 – Claude et Claudette
- 2010 – E'gad, Zombies!
- 2010 – The Symmetry of Love
- 2009 – A Cambridge Tale
- 2009 – Wicked Wood
- 2008 – Ghoul Skool: Haunted Sussex
- 2008 – Spring Heeled Jack
- 2008 – Love Me Still
- 2007 – Holby City
- 2006 – Bikini-Blitzkrieg, Part One: Dance Domination
- 2006 – Bad Girls
- 2006 – Wicked Good with Gavin Barnard
- 2006 – The Da Vinci Code
- 2003 – Dambusters
- 1998 – Ultraviolet

== Publications ==
- 2021 - Full to the Brim with Fizz, Ginger, and Fierce Determination ISBN 978-1-4930512-9-8

== Awards and nominations ==
Year	Result	Award	Category	Work	Ref.
2020	Nominated	National Film Awards UK	Best Thriller	The Isle	
2018	Won	London Independent Film Festival	Best Horror Film	The Isle	
2015	Nominated	Maverick Movie Awards	Best Director	Two Down	
