= Maurice Gueissaz =

Swiss rower

Personal information
- Nationality: Swiss
- Born: 24 May 1923; St. Gallen, Switzerland
- Died: 11 November 1998 (aged 75); Lausanne, Switzerland

Sport
- Sport: Rowing

Maurice Gueissaz (24 May 1923 – 11 November 1998) was a Swiss rower. He competed in the men's double sculls event at the 1948 Summer Olympics.
