= The Sonata =

2018 film directed by Andrew Desmond

- Theatrical release poster
- Directed by: Andrew Desmond
- Written by: Andrew Desmond; Arthur Morin
- Produced by: Aija Berzina; Matthew Bradley; Ron Bradley; Jonathan Feuer; Patrick Fischer; Laurent Fumeron; Alise Gelze; David Gilbery; Daniel Goroshko; James Kermack; Julien Loeffler; Rodolphe Sanzé; Sergey Selyanov; Fabrice Smadja; Sharunya Varriele
- Starring: Freya Tingley; Simon Abkarian; James Faulkner; Rutger Hauer; Matt Barber; James Kermack
- Cinematography: Janis Eglitis
- Edited by: J.P. Ferré
- Music by: Alexis Maingaud
- Production company: CTB Film Company
- Distributed by: Screen Media Films
- Release dates: November 15, 2018 (Russia); January 10, 2020 (United States)
- Running time: 90 minutes
- Countries: United States; France; Russia; Latvia; United Kingdom
- Languages: English; French
- Box office: $180,849

The Sonata is a 2018 mystery thriller film, directed by Andrew Desmond, from a screenplay by Desmond and Arthur Morin. It stars Freya Tingley, Simon Abkarian, James Faulkner, Rutger Hauer, Matt Barber and James Kermack. This was Hauer's final released film during his lifetime before his death the following year. It was released in the United States on January 10, 2020, by Screen Media Films. It grossed $180,849 at the box office.

== Plot ==
Rose is a young and talented English violinist, a rising star in the world of classical music. Her agent and manager Charles has been taking care of her since her mother's demise when Rose was just sixteen. Her father - the infamous composer Richard Marlowe - abandoned the family and became a recluse soon after Rose's birth. Now in her twenties, Rose receives news of her father's death, and that she inherited his mansion in France. Despite the estrangement, the news affects Rose and she decides to visit her late father's house, hoping to understand his reason for abandoning the family all those years ago, much to Charles' disapproval.

At the mansion Rose discovers that her father had spent the last twenty-odd years working on a peculiar sonata for the violin. She contacts Charles, and sends him a sample of the sheet music. Charles' investigation reveals that Richard may have been a member of a satanic cult that believed music was the key to summoning the Antichrist. Despite the revelation, Charles becomes fascinated with the sonata, hoping to use it to bring fame to Rose, himself and his struggling business. He travels to the mansion under the pretext of comforting Rose.

Meanwhile, Rose begins to notice strange things happening around the mansion, and even sees an apparition of her dead father, who points her towards the old chapel nearby. Going there Rose discovers audiotapes of Richard torturing and murdering children, as it apparently helped him compose the sonata. Scared, Rose returns to the mansion and tells Charles about her discovery, saying that the sonata is a work of evil and must to be destroyed. The two have a disagreement, but Charles seemingly backs down. As he is pouring tea, he slips some sleeping pills into Rose's cup. Once she goes to bed, Charles begins deciphering the sonata using the torture tapes. One of the tapes eventually wakes Rose from her sleep and she discovers a mad and aggressive Charles, who demands that she play the sonata to him. Not having a choice, she complies and as she plays, a misty figure appears and flies around the room, eventually making its way to Charles, strangling him.

In the closing scene of the film, Rose is back in England, performing the sonata to a full audience for the first time. Just as she plays the first notes, her eyes start glowing red, and the screen fades to black.

== Cast ==
- Freya Tingley as Rose Fisher
- Simon Abkarian as Charles Vernais
- James Faulkner as Sir Victor Ferdinand
- Rutger Hauer as Richard Marlowe
- Matt Barber as James
- Catherine Schaub-Abkarain as Thérèse
- Christopher Brand as The Notary
- James Kermack as The Sound Engineer
- Myster Jo as Tobacco Shop Owner
- Laine Ligere Stengrévica as Meredith
- Aurélija Pronina as Ghost Child #1
- Andrejs Zikovs as Ghost Child #2
- Maija Cipste as Ghost Child #3
- Artüra Ghoss as Ghost Child #4
- Jurijs Krüze as Taxi Driver
- Janis Libietis as Customer #1
- Atis Afréds Brasmanis as Customer #2
- Olga Svecova as Bar Waitress
- Aleksandrs Mihailovs as Barman
- Alina Vasijeva as Rose Violin Double

== Release ==
The Sonata was released in Russia by Screen Media Films on November 15, 2018, and in the United States on January 10, 2020.

== Reception ==
On the review aggregator website Rotten Tomatoes, 50% of 26 critics' reviews are positive, with an average rating of 5.5/10. Metacritic, which uses a weighted average, assigned the film a score of 41 out of 100, based on 8 critics, indicating "mixed or average" reviews.

Noel Murray of the Los Angeles Times wrote, "First-time feature-director Andrew Desmond brings such confident panache to the supernatural thriller The Sonata that it almost doesn't matter how derivative the plot is." The Hollywood News's Kat Hughes called the film "a true Gothic ghost story through and through", adding, "It doesn't reinvent the wheel, going through all the expected motions, but it is a well put together film with some nice flourishes."

Rex Reed of The New York Observer gave the film 1/4 stars, writing, "Ignoring the fact that nothing much is going on here, director Andrew Desmond plods along trying to make you believe otherwise." Jeannette Catsoulis of The New York Times called it "a leaden Gothic ghost story whose high-gloss imagery fails to disguise its low-energy plot." NPR's Andrew Lapin criticized the film as "dreadfully dull and feel[ing] more than a little slapped together", and added, "Would-be demonologists can get more spook mileage from any high school orchestra's rendition of Danse Macabre."
