= Ben Piessens =

Belgian rower

Personal information
- Born: Benoit Piessens; 23 February 1912
- Died: 24 December 1975 (aged 63)

Sport
- Sport: Rowing
Medal record
Men's rowing
Representing Belgium
European Rowing Championships
Bronze medal – third place	1938 Milan	Double sculls

Benoit Piessens (23 February 1912 – 24 December 1975) was a Belgian rower. He competed at the 1948 Summer Olympics in London with the men's double sculls where they were eliminated in the semi-final.
