= Keeping Rosy =

2014 British-American film

- Theatrical film poster
- Directed by: Steve Reeves
- Written by: Mike Oughton; Steve Reeves
- Produced by: Isabelle Georgeaux; Richard Holmes
- Starring: Maxine Peake; Sam Hoare; Tori Butler-Hart; Yvonne Wandera; Dominic Geraghty; Elisa Lasowski; Christine Bottomley; Blake Harrison
- Cinematography: Roger Pratt
- Edited by: Scot Crane; Paul Watts
- Music by: Stephen Warbeck
- Release date: June 27, 2014 (UK)
- Running time: 89 mins.
- Countries: United Kingdom; United States
- Language: English

Keeping Rosy is a 2014 British-American psychological thriller film, directed by Steve Reeves, who also co-wrote with Mike Oughton. It stars Maxine Peake, Sam Hoare, Tori Butler-Hart, Elisa Lasowski, Christine Bottomley, and Blake Harrison. It premiered in 2014 in the UK.

== Synopsis ==
All Charlotte wants from life is to be cut a slice of the media agency she has devoted herself to building. Instead she embarks on a journey of self-discovery, atonement and danger.

== Cast ==
- Maxine Peake as Charlotte
- Sam Hoare as Tom
- Tori Butler-Hart as Jen
- Yvonne Wandera as Emma
- Dominic Geraghty as Simon
- Elisa Lasowski as Maya
- Christine Bottomley as Sarah
- Blake Harrison as Roger

== Reception ==
On the review aggregator website Rotten Tomatoes, 64% of 14 critics' reviews are positive, with an average rating of 5.40/10.

Mark Adams of Screen Daily praised Maxine Peake for her "striking central performance". Likewise, Stephen Dalton of The Hollywood Reporter lauded co-star Blake Harrison for his performance as well. And Daniel Green of Cinevue rated it 3/5 stars, stating that it "showcases the clear talent of its first-time helmer", Steve Reeves.

Charlotte O'Sullivan of The Standard also rated the film 3/5 stars, and echoed that "Peake is superb". And Mark Kermode of The Observer, who rated it 3/5 stars as well, complimented Roger Pratt's cinematography for its "handsome widescreen framing".

Contrastly, Leslie Felperin of The Guardian rated the film 2/5 stars, lambasting "the trite, doom-laden score and plausibility problems". And Kate Muir of The Times decries that "plot holes abound" and "the result is mediocre".
