= Achille Giovannoni =

French rower (1926–2014)

Personal information
- Nationality: French
- Born: 14 February 1926
- Died: 25 February 2014 (aged 88)

Sport
- Sport: Rowing

Achille Giovannoni (14 February 1926 – 25 February 2014) was a French rower. He competed in the men's double sculls event at the 1952 Summer Olympics.
