= Mario Ustolin =

Italian rower

Personal information
- Born: 4 April 1924 Trieste, Italy
- Died: 30 December 2006 (aged 82) Trieste, Italy

Sport
- Sport: Rowing
Medal record
Men's rowing
Representing Italy
European Rowing Championships
Silver medal – second place	1949 Amsterdam	Double sculls

Mario Ustolin (4 April 1924 – 30 December 2006) was an Italian rower. He competed at the 1948 Summer Olympics in London with the men's double sculls where they were eliminated in the semi-final.
