= Keijo Koivumäki =

Finnish rower

Personal information
- Nationality: Finnish
- Born: 4 November 1926; Seinäjoki, Finland
- Died: 5 December 2017 (aged 91)

Sport
- Sport: Rowing

Keijo Koivumäki (4 November 1926 – 5 December 2017) was a Finnish rower. He competed in the men's double sculls event at the 1952 Summer Olympics.
