= Ángel Malvicino =

Argentine rower

Personal information
- Born: 20 May 1921; Crespo, Argentina
- Died: 2 June 2008 (aged 87)

Sport
- Sport: Rowing

Ángel Malvicino (20 May 1921 – 2 June 2008) was an Argentine rower. He competed in the men's double sculls event at the 1948 Summer Olympics.
