= Fred Graves (rower) =

Canadian rower

Personal information
- Born: 14 August 1924; Ottawa, Ontario, Canada
- Died: 11 February 2009 (aged 84)

Sport
- Sport: Rowing

Fred Graves (14 August 1924 – 11 February 2009) was a Canadian rower. He competed in the men's double sculls event at the 1948 Summer Olympics.
