= Jacques Maillet =

French rower (1926–2019)

Personal information
- Born: Jacques Henri Marie Maillet; 7 September 1926 Asnières-sur-Seine, France
- Died: 30 January 2019 (aged 92)

Sport
- Sport: Rowing
Medal record
Men's rowing
Representing France
European Rowing Championships
Bronze medal – third place	1949 Amsterdam	Double sculls

Jacques Henri Marie Maillet (7 September 1926 – 30 January 2019) was a French rower. He competed at the 1948 Summer Olympics in London with the men's double sculls where they were eliminated in the semi-final.
