= Eero Koivumäki =

Finnish rower

Personal information
- Nationality: Finnish
- Born: 20 June 1924; Riihimäki, Finland
- Died: 12 October 2013 (aged 89); Helsinki, Finland

Sport
- Sport: Rowing

Eero Koivumäki (20 June 1924 – 12 October 2013) was a Finnish rower. He competed in the men's double sculls event at the 1952 Summer Olympics.
