= Tom Neumeier =

Dutch rower (1921–1991)

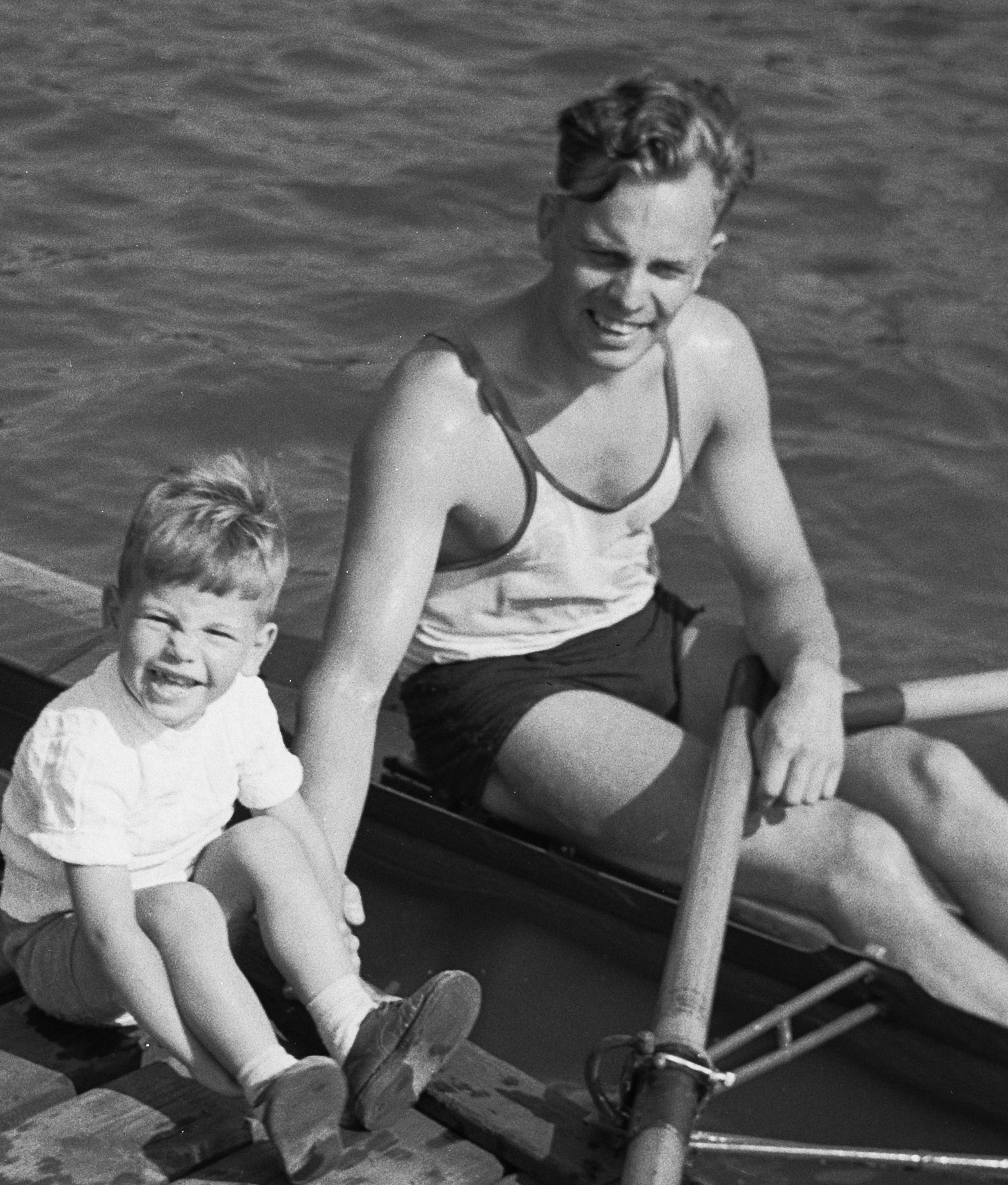
- Tom Neumeier with son in 1953

Personal information
- Born: 2 February 1921 Amsterdam, the Netherlands
- Died: 26 December 1991 (aged 70) Noordwijkerhout, the Netherlands

Sport
- Sport: Rowing
- Club: Willem III Rowing Club
Medal record
Men's rowing
Representing the Netherlands
European Rowing Championships
Gold medal – first place	1947 Lucerne	Double sculls
Silver medal – second place	1950 Milan	Single sculls

Christiaan Tom Neumeier (2 February 1921 – 26 December 1991) was a Dutch rower who won the European title in the double scull event in 1947, together with Henk van der Meer. They also competed at the 1948 Summer Olympics, but failed to reach the final. Neumeier was a lawyer by profession.
