= Party Animals (TV series) =

- Created by: World Productions for BBC
- Starring: Patrick Baladi; Andrew Buchan; Matt Smith; Raquel Cassidy; Shelley Conn; Andrea Riseborough; Clemency Burton-Hill; Pip Carter; Peter Wight
- Country of origin: United Kingdom
- Original language: English
- No. of series: 1
- No. of episodes: 8

Production
- Running time: Varies
- Production company: World Productions

Original release
- Network: BBC Two
- Release: 31 January – 21 March 2007

Party Animals is a British television drama series screened on BBC Two in 2007. It was written by Ben Richards and Robert Jones, and produced by Eleanor Greene for World Productions, the makers of No Angels and This Life.

Party Animals tells the story of people working in and around the British Parliament, including researchers, lobbyists and Members of Parliament. The show featured Matt Smith in his first major television role, portraying Labour Party researcher Danny Foster. Andrew Buchan played Scott Foster, Danny's older brother and a lobbyist. The show also starred Shelley Conn as a Tory party parliamentary researcher and aspiring Minister, and Andrea Riseborough, who works alongside Danny as an intern.

In Australia, ABC1 began broadcasting the show from 2 December 2008 on a Tuesday 8:30pm timeslot over the ('non-ratings period') summer break. In the province of Ontario, Canada, TVOntario (Ontario's public educational media organisation), began showing the series in February 2010. In the province of British Columbia, Canada, The Knowledge Network began showing the series in September 2011. In Norway, NRK broadcast the show from May to June 2012.

== Cast ==
- Andrew Buchan as Scott Foster
- Shelley Conn as Ashika Chandrimani
- Andrea Riseborough as Kirsty MacKenzie
- Matt Smith as Danny Foster
- Patrick Baladi as James Northcote
- Clemency Burton-Hill as Sophie Montgomery
- Pip Carter as Matt Baker
- Raquel Cassidy as Jo Porter
- Colin Salmon as Stephen Templeton
- Peter Wight as George Morgan
- Kika Markham as Vanessa Renfew
- Marian McLoughlin as Barbara Foster
- Emily Beecham as Vienna Lurie
- Guy Flanagan as Felix Carrera
- Nick Sampson as Paul Gaughan
