= Gabriel Beaudry =

Canadian rower

Personal information
- Born: 1 August 1927; Ottawa, Ontario, Canada
- Died: 19 September 2009 (aged 82); Vernon, British Columbia, Canada

Sport
- Sport: Rowing

Gabriel Beaudry (1 August 1927 – 19 September 2009) was a Canadian rower. He competed in the men's double sculls event at the 1948 Summer Olympics.
