= Bert and Dickie =

- Cover of DVD
- Written by: William Ivory
- Directed by: David Blair
- Starring: Sam Hoare; Matt Smith; Geoffrey Palmer; Douglas Hodge; James Frain
- Country of origin: United Kingdom

Production
- Running time: 89 minutes

Original release
- Network: BBC One
- Release: 25 July 2012

As part of the celebrations for the 2012 Summer Olympics in London, the BBC produced the film Bert and Dickie (also called Going For Gold: The '48 Games), depicting Dickie Burnell and Bert Bushnell's achievement at the 1948 Games. The drama was written by William Ivory and directed by David Blair.

== Plot ==
Thrown together just five weeks before the final of the 1948 London Olympics, Bert Bushnell and Dickie Burnell row to victory in the double sculls.

== Cast ==
- Sam Hoare as Dickie Burnell
- Matt Smith as Bert Bushnell
- Geoffrey Palmer as Charles Burnell
- James Frain as Jack Beresford
- Douglas Hodge as John Bushnell
- Anastasia Hille as Lena Bushnell
- Alexandra Moen as Rosalind Burnell

== Reception ==
Paddy Shennan of the Liverpool Echo said Bert and Dickie is "thoroughly absorbing and uplifting" and "a winning drama about a winning team". James Watson of The Telegraph highlighted the performances of Douglas Hodge and Geoffrey Palmer: "Douglas Hodge brilliantly conveyed John Bushnell’s almost embarrassed desperation for Bert to succeed where he’d failed. Playing Charles Burnell, Geoffrey Palmer was, as ever, hard to beat for lugubrious gruffness"' and concluded his review with "anybody whose eyes didn’t join Bushnell Snr’s in filling with tears is stronger than me."

== Awards and nominations ==
The following is a table listing the awards and nominations received by Bert and Dickie:

Year	Association	Award Category	Notes	Result
2012	Monte-Carlo TV Festival	Golden Nymph	Best Television Film	Nominated
2012	Monte-Carlo TV Festival	Golden Nymph	Television Films - Best Director: David Blair	Nominated
