= Derek Riley =

Canadian rower (1922–2018)

Personal information
- Full name: John Derek Riley
- Born: July 1, 1922 Winnipeg, Manitoba
- Died: May 6, 2018 (aged 95) Winnipeg, Manitoba

Sport
- Country: Canada
- Sport: Rowing

John Derek Riley CM (July 1, 1922 – May 6, 2018) was a Canadian rower who competed in the 1952 Summer Olympics. Riley was inducted in the Manitoba Sports Hall of Fame and Museum in 2009 and appointed the Order of Canada in 2014.

== Early life and education ==
Riley was born on July 1, 1922, in Winnipeg, Manitoba. He graduated from the University of Manitoba with degrees in commerce and accounting.

== Career ==
Riley began his career as a member of the Royal Canadian Navy in World War II. After starting rowing in the Winnipeg Rowing Club in 1946, Riley competed in rowing competitions for the Royal Canadian Henley Regatta and Northwest International Rowing Association. In RCH competitions, Riley won a juniors competition in 1946 and a seniors competition with Theo Dubois in 1947. Alternatively, Riley won over thirty medals in the NWIRA including a seniors event with Bob Richards in 1948 and every medal competition in 1961. His final NWIRA event was in 1963.

In world competitions, Riley competed at the 1952 Summer Olympics in rowing and was the chairman for the rowing events at the 1967 Pan American Games. Outside of rowing, Riley worked at the Hudson's Bay Company as a chief financial officer. Later positions included chief executive officer of a Winnipeg metal company and chairman of North West Company in 1987.

== Awards and honours ==
In 2009, Riley was inducted into the Manitoba Sports Hall of Fame and Museum. The following year, he became a member of St. John's-Ravenscourt School's sports hall of fame. In 2014, Riley was appointed the Order of Canada. He died in Winnipeg on May 6, 2018, at the age of 95.
