= Juan Rodríguez (rower) =

Uruguayan rower (1928–2019)

Olympic medal record

Men's rowing

Representing Uruguay
Bronze medal – third place	1948 London	Double sculls
Bronze medal – third place	1952 Helsinki	Double sculls

Juan A. Rodríguez Iglesias (9 July 1928 – 27 September 2019) was a rower from Uruguay, who represented his native country twice at the Summer Olympics (1948 and 1952). In both tournaments he won the bronze medal in the men's doubles sculls event. He was born in Dolores, Uruguay.
