= Ebbe Parsner =

Danish rower

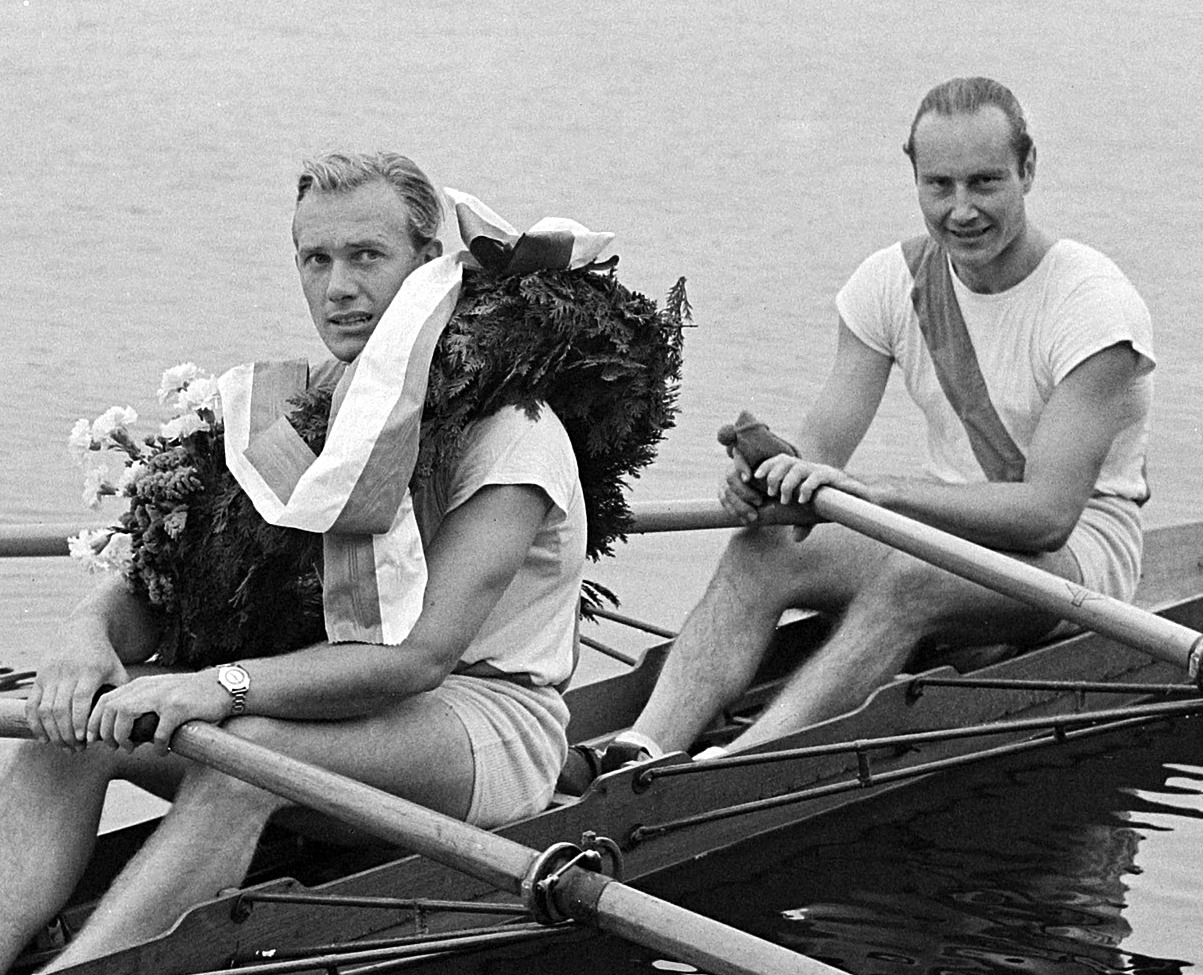
- Aage Larsen and Ebbe Parsner at the 1949 European championships

Personal information
- Born: 6 June 1922 Copenhagen, Denmark
- Died: 24 October 2013 (aged 91)

Sport
- Sport: Rowing
- Club: DFDS Idrætsklub, København
Medal record
Representing Denmark
Olympic Games
Silver medal – second place	1948 London	Double sculls
European Rowing Championships
Gold medal – first place	1949 Amsterdam	Double sculls
Gold medal – first place	1950 Milan	Double sculls

Ebbe Vestermann Parsner (6 June 1922 – 24 October 2013) was a Danish rower who specialized in the double scull event. Together with Aage Larsen he won the European titles in 1949 and 1950 and a silver medal at the 1948 Olympics. At the 1952 Games they were eliminated in the first round.

During World War II Parsner served in the navy. After retiring from competitions he worked as a sales manager for General Motors and BP. Parsner was married and had two daughters. His wife died in 2008.
