= Aage Larsen =

Danish rower (1923–2016)

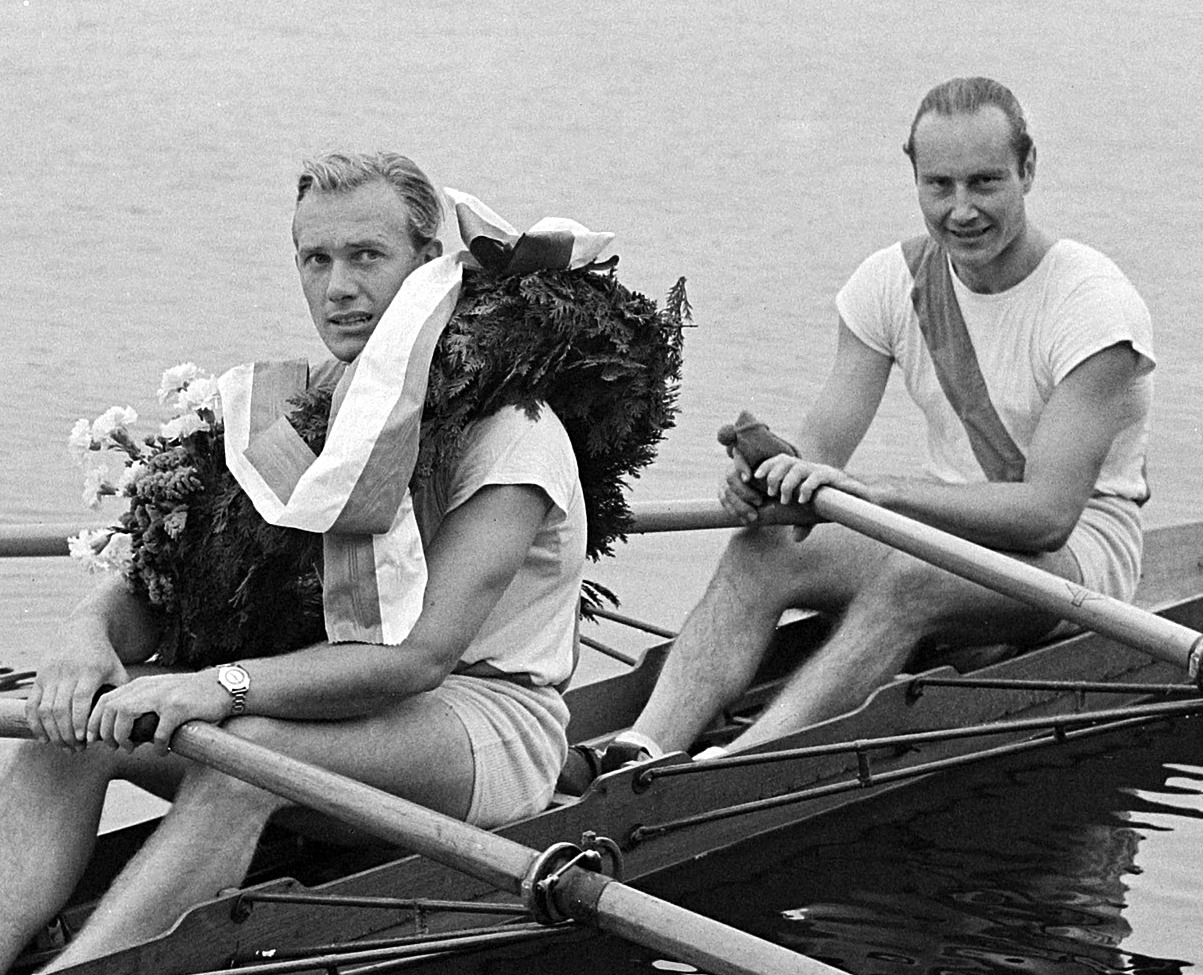
- Aage Larsen and Ebbe Parsner at the 1949 European championships

Personal information
- Born: 3 August 1923 Søborggård, Denmark
- Died: 31 October 2016 (aged 93)

Sport
- Sport: Rowing
- Club: DFDS Idrætsklub, København; Fredensborg Roklub, Fredensborg
Medal record
Representing Denmark
Olympic Games
Silver medal – second place	1948 London	Double sculls
European Rowing Championships
Gold medal – first place	1949 Amsterdam	Double sculls
Gold medal – first place	1950 Milan	Double sculls

Aage Ernst Larsen (3 August 1923 – 31 October 2016) was a Danish rower who specialized in the double scull event. Together with Ebbe Parsner he won the European titles in 1949 and 1950 and a silver medal at the 1948 Olympics. At the 1952 Games they were eliminated in the first round.
