= Rowing at the 1952 Summer Olympics – Men's single sculls =

Olympic rowing event

Men's single sculls at the Games of the XV Olympiad
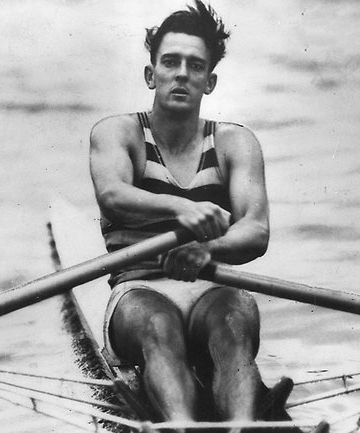
- Silver medallist Mervyn Wood in 1952
- Venue: Meilahti
- Date: 20–23 July 1952
- Competitors: 18 from 18 nations
- Winning time: 8:12.8

Medalists
1st place, gold medalist(s)		Yuriy Tyukalov; Soviet Union
2nd place, silver medalist(s)		Mervyn Wood; Australia
3rd place, bronze medalist(s)		Teodor Kocerka; Poland

The men's single sculls competition at the 1952 Summer Olympics took place at Meilahti, Helsinki, Finland. The event was held from 20 to 23 July. There were 18 competitors from 18 nations, with each nation limited to a single boat in the event. The event was won by Yuriy Tyukalov of the Soviet Union, in the nation's debut at the Games. Defending champion Mervyn Wood took silver, the fourth medal in five Games for Australia. Teodor Kocerka's bronze was Poland's first medal in the men's single sculls.

== Background ==
This was the 11th appearance of the event. Rowing had been on the programme in 1896 but was cancelled due to bad weather. The single sculls has been held every time that rowing has been contested, beginning in 1900.

Five of the 14 single scullers from the 1948 Games returned: gold medalist Mervyn Wood of Australia, silver medalist Eduardo Risso of Uruguay, fourth-place finisher John B. Kelly Jr. of the United States, eighth-place finisher Ian Stephen of South Africa, and twelfth-place finisher Juan Omedes of Spain. Wood had also won his second Diamond Challenge Sculls earlier in 1952 and was the favorite. Significant challengers included Risso, Kelly, Tony Fox of Great Britain (1951 Diamond Challenge winner), Paul Meyer of Switzerland, and Ian Stephen of South Africa.

Chile, Saar, and the Soviet Union each made their debut in the event. Great Britain made its 10th appearance, most among nations, having missed only the 1904 Games in St. Louis.

== Competition format ==
This rowing event was a single scull event, meaning that each boat was propelled by a single rower. The "scull" portion means that the rower used two oars, one on each side of the boat. The course returned to the 2000 metres distance that became the Olympic standard in 1912 (with the exception of 1948).

The competition expanded from previous years to include a second repechage after the semifinals. This brought the tournament to five rounds total: quarterfinals, semifinals, and a final with two repechages after the first two rounds.

Four heats were held in the first round. The first two boats in each heat advanced to the semifinals, while the rest went to the first repechage. The repechage round also consisted of four heats. Only the winner of each heat advanced to the second repechage (these rowers did not compete in the semifinals). The winners of the two semifinal heats advanced directly to the final and the rest competed in the second repechage. Three heats were held in the second repechage, where the winner of each heat advanced to the final.

== Schedule ==
All times are Eastern European Summer Time (UTC+3)

Date	Time	Round
Monday, 21 July 1952	9:00	Quarterfinals; First repechage Semifinals
Tuesday, 22 July 1952		Second repechage
Wednesday, 23 July 1952	17:00	Final

== Results ==
=== Quarterfinals ===
==== Quarterfinal 1 ====
Rank	Rower	Nation	Time	Notes
1	Tony Fox	Great Britain	7:45.1	Q
2	Ian Stephen	South Africa	7:47.7	Q
3	Sevi Holmsten	Finland	7:52.1	R
4	Juan Omedes	Spain	8:03.1	R
5	Carlos Adueza	Chile	8:22.3	R

==== Quarterfinal 2 ====
Rank	Rower	Nation	Time	Notes
1	Mervyn Wood	Australia	7:44.1	Q
2	Paul Meyer	Switzerland	7:44.5	Q
3	Günther Schütt	Saar	7:58.4	R
4	František Reich	Czechoslovakia	7:59.0	R
5	Henri Steenacker	Belgium	8:04.0	R

==== Quarterfinal 3 ====
Rank	Rower	Nation	Time	Notes
1	John B. Kelly Jr.	United States	7:58.4	Q
2	Teodor Kocerka	Poland	7:59.5	Q
3	Ugo Pifferi	Italy	8:09.0	R
4	Hussein El-Alfy	Egypt	8:33.5	R

==== Quarterfinal 4 ====
Rank	Rower	Nation	Time	Notes
1	Yuriy Tyukalov	Soviet Union	7:47.9	Q
2	Eduardo Risso	Uruguay	7:52.0	Q
3	Henri Butel	France	8:00.4	R
4	Rob van Mesdag	Netherlands	8:02.0	R

=== First repechage ===
==== First repechage heat 1 ====
Rank	Rower	Nation	Time	Notes
1	Rob van Mesdag	Netherlands	7:35.6	R
2	Sevi Holmsten	Finland	7:37.2	
3	Hussein El-Alfy	Egypt	8:07.1	

==== First repechage heat 2 ====
Rank	Rower	Nation	Time	Notes
1	Günther Schütt	Saar	7:38.4	R
2	Henri Butel	France	7:41.2	
3	Juan Omedes	Spain	7:45.1	

==== First repechage heat 3 ====
Rank	Rower	Nation	Time	Notes
1	František Reich	Czechoslovakia	7:39.0	R
2	Ugo Pifferi	Italy	7:47.5	

==== First repechage heat 4 ====
Rank	Rower	Nation	Time	Notes
1	Henri Steenacker	Belgium	7:43.8	R
2	Carlos Adueza	Chile	8:08.9	

=== Semifinals ===
==== Semifinal 1 ====
Rank	Rower	Nation	Time	Notes
1	Tony Fox	Great Britain	7:54.4	Q
2	Mervyn Wood	Australia	8:02.5	R
3	Eduardo Risso	Uruguay	8:05.9	R
4	Teodor Kocerka	Poland	9:10.6	R

==== Semifinal 2 ====
Rank	Rower	Nation	Time	Notes
1	Yuriy Tyukalov	Soviet Union	7:52.6	Q
2	John B. Kelly Jr.	United States	7:57.3	R
3	Ian Stephen	South Africa	8:02.3	R
4	Paul Meyer	Switzerland	8:07.1	R

=== Second repechage ===
==== Second repechage heat 1 ====
Rank	Rower	Nation	Time	Notes
1	Mervyn Wood	Australia	7:45.5	Q
2	Paul Meyer	Switzerland	7:48.3	
3	Rob van Mesdag	Netherlands	7:57.2	
4	Henri Steenacker	Belgium	7:59.5	

==== Second repechage heat 2 ====
Rank	Rower	Nation	Time	Notes
1	Teodor Kocerka	Poland	7:41.8	Q
2	John B. Kelly Jr.	United States	7:42.0	
3	František Reich	Czechoslovakia	7:55.0	

==== Second repechage heat 3 ====
Rank	Rower	Nation	Time	Notes
1	Ian Stephen	South Africa	7:38.6	Q
2	Günther Schütt	Saar	7:42.9	
3	Eduardo Risso	Uruguay	7:50.5	

=== Final ===
Rank	Rower	Nation	Time
1st place, gold medalist(s)	Yuriy Tyukalov	Soviet Union	8:12.8
2nd place, silver medalist(s)	Mervyn Wood	Australia	8:14.5
3rd place, bronze medalist(s)	Teodor Kocerka	Poland	8:19.4
4	Tony Fox	Great Britain	8:22.5
5	Ian Stephen	South Africa	8:31.4

== Results summary ==
Rank	Rower	Nation	Quarterfinals	First repechage	Semifinals	Second repechage	Final
1st place, gold medalist(s)	Yuriy Tyukalov	Soviet Union	7:47.9	Bye	7:52.6	Bye	8:12.8
2nd place, silver medalist(s)	Mervyn Wood	Australia	7:44.1	Bye	8:02.5	7:45.5	8:14.5
3rd place, bronze medalist(s)	Teodor Kocerka	Poland	7:59.5	Bye	9:10.6	7:41.8	8:19.4
4	Tony Fox	Great Britain	7:45.1	Bye	7:54.4	Bye	8:22.5
5	Ian Stephen	South Africa	7:47.7	Bye	8:02.3	7:38.6	8:31.4
6	John B. Kelly Jr.	United States	7:58.4	Bye	7:57.3	7:42.0	Did not advance
7	Günther Schütt	Saar	7:58.4	7:38.4	Bye	7:42.9	Did not advance
8	Paul Meyer	Switzerland	7:44.5	Bye	8:07.1	7:48.3	Did not advance
9	Eduardo Risso	Uruguay	7:52.0	Bye	8:05.9	7:50.5	Did not advance
10	František Reich	Czechoslovakia	7:59.0	7:39.0	Bye	7:55.0	Did not advance
11	Rob van Mesdag	Netherlands	8:02.0	7:35.6	Bye	7:57.2	Did not advance
12	Henri Steenacker	Belgium	8:04.0	7:43.8	Bye	7:59.5	Did not advance
13	Sevi Holmsten	Finland	7:52.1	7:37.2	Did not advance		
14	Henri Butel	France	8:00.4	7:41.2	Did not advance		
15	Juan Omedes	Spain	8:03.1	7:45.1	Did not advance		
16	Ugo Pifferi	Italy	8:09.0	7:47.5	Did not advance		
17	Hussein El-Alfy	Egypt	8:33.5	8:07.1	Did not advance		
18	Carlos Adueza	Chile	8:22.3	8:08.9	Did not advance		
