= Rowing at the 1956 Summer Olympics – Men's double sculls =

Men's double sculls at the Games of the XVI Olympiad
- Venue: Meilahti
- Date: 23–27 November 1956
- Competitors: 16 from 8 nations

Medalists
1st place, gold medalist(s)		Aleksandr Berkutov; Yuriy Tyukalov	Soviet Union
2nd place, silver medalist(s)		Pat Costello; Jim Gardiner	United States
3rd place, bronze medalist(s)		Murray Riley; Mervyn Wood	Australia

The men's double sculls competition at the 1956 Summer Olympics took place on Lake Wendouree, Ballarat, Australia. The event was held from 23 to 27 November.

== Heats ==
The winner in each heat qualified for the finals. The others must compete in the repechage.

=== Heat 1 ===
Rank	Athlete Name	Country	Time	Notes
1	Pat Costello; Jim Gardiner	United States	6:54.5	F
2	Sidney Rand; Bill Rand	Great Britain	7:03.4	
3	Miguel Seijas; Paulo Carvalho	Uruguay	7:09.6	
4	Fernand Steenacker; Henri Steenacker	Belgium	7:24.1	

=== Heat 2 ===
Rank	Athlete Name	Country	Time	Notes
1	Aleksandr Berkutov; Yuriy Tyukalov	Soviet Union	6:44.4	F
2	Thomas Schneider; Kurt Hipper	Germany	6:55.8	
3	Murray Riley; Mervyn Wood	Australia	7:01.2	
4	Albert Krajmer; František Reich	Czechoslovakia	7:05.1	

== First repechage ==
The winner in each heat qualified for the finals.

=== Heat 1 ===
Rank	Athlete Name	Country	Time	Notes
1	Murray Riley; Mervyn Wood	Australia	8:12.2	F
2	Sidney Rand; Bill Rand	Great Britain	8:19.4	
3	Fernand Steenacker; Henri Steenacker	Belgium	9:01.9	

=== Heat 2 ===
Rank	Athlete Name	Country	Time	Notes
1	Thomas Schneider; Kurt Hipper	Germany	8:16.7	F
2	Miguel Seijas; Paulo Carvalho	Uruguay	8:27.5	
3	Albert Krajmer; František Reich	Czechoslovakia	8:38.2	

== Final ==
Rank	Athlete Name	Country	Time	Notes
1st place, gold medalist(s)	Aleksandr Berkutov; Yuriy Tyukalov	Soviet Union	7:24.0	
2nd place, silver medalist(s)	Pat Costello; Jim Gardiner	United States	7:32.2	
3rd place, bronze medalist(s)	Murray Riley; Mervyn Wood	Australia	7:37.4	
4	Thomas Schneider; Kurt Hipper	Germany	7:41.7	
