= Steenacker =

Steenacker is a Belgian surname. Notable people with the surname include:

- Fernand Steenacker (1931–2018), Belgian rower
- Henri Steenacker (1926–1993), Belgian rower, brother of Fernand
