= Rowing at the 1960 Summer Olympics – Men's single sculls =

Olympic rowing event

Men's single sculls at the Games of the XVII Olympiad
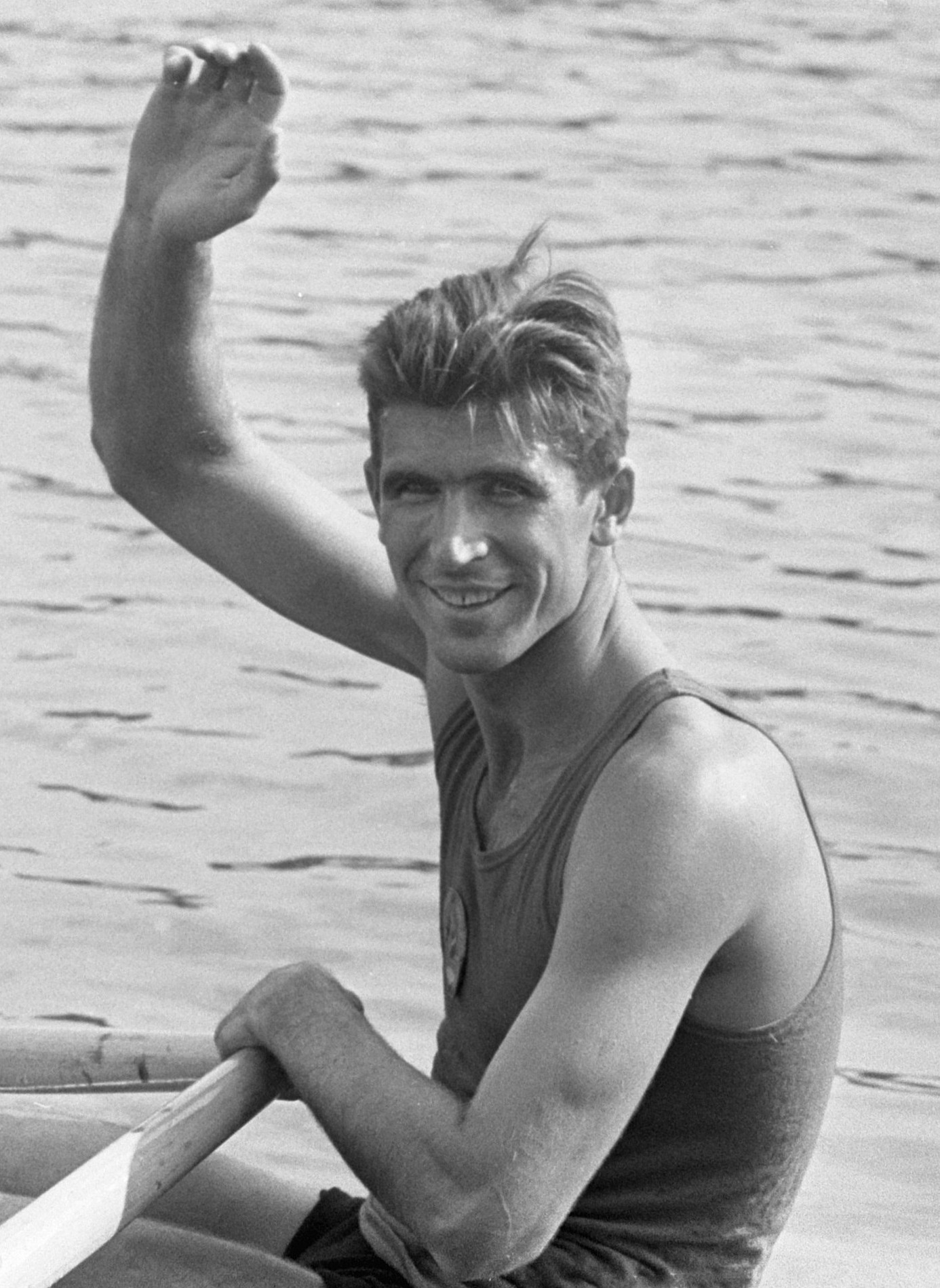
- Gold medalist Vyacheslav Ivanov (1964)
- Venue: Lake Albano
- Dates: 30 August – 3 September 1960
- Competitors: 13 from 13 nations
- Winning time: 7:13.96

Medalists
1st place, gold medalist(s)		Vyacheslav Ivanov; Soviet Union
2nd place, silver medalist(s)		Achim Hill; United Team of Germany
3rd place, bronze medalist(s)		Teodor Kocerka; Poland

The men's single sculls competition at the 1960 Summer Olympics took place at Lake Albano, Italy. The event was held from 30 August until 3 September. There were 13 competitors from 13 nations, with each nation limited to one boat in the event. The event was won by Vyacheslav Ivanov of the Soviet Union, the second man to successfully repeat as Olympic champion (after Australia's Bobby Pearce in 1928 and 1932). It was the third consecutive Soviet victory in the event, with Yuriy Tyukalov winning in 1952 before Ivanov's victories in 1956 and 1960. Ivanov would go on to win again in 1964, becoming the first man to win 3 gold medals in the event. The silver medal went to Achim Hill of the United Team of Germany, the first medal in the men's single sculls for the combined team and the first single sculls medal for any German rower since 1936. Teodor Kocerka of Poland took bronze. Ivanov and Kocerka were the fourth and fifth men to win multiple medals of any colour in the event, with Kocerka previously taking bronze in 1952. It was Kocerka's third straight final in the event, placing fourth between his two bronzes. Australia's three-Games podium streak ended when Stuart Mackenzie fell ill and could not compete.

== Background ==
This was the 13th appearance of the event. Rowing had been on the programme in 1896 but was cancelled due to bad weather. The single sculls has been held every time that rowing has been contested, beginning in 1900.

Three of the 12 single scullers from the 1956 Games returned: gold medalist Vyacheslav Ivanov of the Soviet Union, fourth-place finisher (and 1952 bronze medalist) Teodor Kocerka of Poland, and fifth-place finisher James Hill of New Zealand. The top two scullers in 1960 were Ivanov (defending Olympic champion and two-time reigning European champion) and Stuart Mackenzie of Australia (1956 silver medalist, 1957 and 1958 European champion, reigning British Empire and Commonwealth Games champion, and four-time consecutive Diamond Challenge Sculls winner—he would stretch that streak to 6 in 1961 and 1962). But Mackenzie became ill before the competition and did not compete, leaving Ivanov as the heavy favorite to repeat.

For the first time, no nations made their debut in the event. Great Britain made its 12th appearance, most among nations, having missed only the 1904 Games in St. Louis.

== Competition format ==
This rowing event was a single scull event, meaning that each boat was propelled by a single rower. The "scull" portion means that the rower used two oars, one on each side of the boat. The course used the 2000 metres distance that became the Olympic standard in 1912.

Despite having one more competitor than the 1956 Games, the 1960 format dropped a round. The competition now consisted of only three rounds: semifinals, a repechage, and a final. The six-boat final returned.

- Semifinals: Three heats of 4 or 5 boats each. The top boat in each heat advanced to the final, the remaining boats (10 total) went to the repechage.
- Repechage: Three heats of 3 or 4 boats each. The winner of each heat rejoined the semifinal winners in the final, with the remaining 7 boats (2nd, 3rd, and 4th in each heat) eliminated.
- Final: One heat of 6 boats.

== Schedule ==
All times are Central European Time (UTC+1)

Date	Time	Round
Tuesday, 30 August 1960	17:40	Semifinals
Thursday, 1 September 1960	11:20	Repechage
Saturday, 3 September 1960	16:00	Final

== Results ==
=== Semifinals ===
Three heats were held on 30 August. The winner of each heat directly advanced to finals, while the others went to the repechage round.

==== Semifinal 1 ====
Rank	Rower	Nation	Time	Notes
1	James Hill	New Zealand	7:19.64	Q
2	Achim Hill	United Team of Germany	7:23.55	R
3	Harry Parker	United States	7:26.88	R
4	David Meineke	South Africa	7:37.11	R
5	Julio López	Spain	8:13.94	R

==== Semifinal 2 ====
Rank	Rower	Nation	Time	Notes
1	Vyacheslav Ivanov	Soviet Union	7:22.20	Q
2	Lex Redelé	Netherlands	7:32.24	R
3	Teodor Kocerka	Poland	7:33.38	R
4	Hugo Waser	Switzerland	7:34.67	R

==== Semifinal 3 ====
Rank	Rower	Nation	Time	Notes
1	Savino Rebek	Italy	7:29.58	Q
2	Jorma Kortelainen	Finland	7:39.51	R
3	Horst Fink	Austria	7:43.53	R
4	Sidney Rand	Great Britain	7:46.98	R

=== Repechage ===
The repechage was held on 31 August. The winner of each repechage heat advanced to the final.

==== Repechage heat 1 ====
Rank	Rower	Nation	Time	Notes
1	Achim Hill	United Team of Germany	7:31.04	Q
2	Hugo Waser	Switzerland	7:42.00	
3	Horst Fink	Austria	7:47.09	
4	Julio Lopez	Spain	8:11.40	

==== Repechage heat 2 ====
Rank	Rower	Nation	Time	Notes
1	Harry Parker	United States	7:29.86	Q
2	Lex Redelé	Netherlands	7:32.93	
3	Sidney Rand	Great Britain	7:50.31	

==== Repechage heat 3 ====
Rank	Rower	Nation	Time	Notes
1	Teodor Kocerka	Poland	7:24.31	Q
2	Jorma Kortelainen	Finland	7:32.95	
3	David Meineke	South Africa	7:37.94	

=== Final ===
The final was held on 3 September at 16:00.

Rank	Rower	Nation	Time
1st place, gold medalist(s)	Vyacheslav Ivanov	Soviet Union	7:13.96
2nd place, silver medalist(s)	Achim Hill	United Team of Germany	7:20.21
3rd place, bronze medalist(s)	Teodor Kocerka	Poland	7:21.26
4	James Hill	New Zealand	7:23.98
5	Harry Parker	United States	7:29.26
6	Savino Rebek	Italy	7:31.09

== Results summary ==
Rank	Rower	Nation	Semifinals	Repechage	Final
1st place, gold medalist(s)	Vyacheslav Ivanov	Soviet Union	7:22.20	Bye	7:13.96
2nd place, silver medalist(s)	Achim Hill	United Team of Germany	7:23.55	7:31.04	7:20.21
3rd place, bronze medalist(s)	Teodor Kocerka	Poland	7:33.38	7:24.31	7:21.26
4	James Hill	New Zealand	7:19.64	Bye	7:23.98
5	Harry Parker	United States	7:26.88	7:29.86	7:29.26
6	Savino Rebek	Italy	7:29.58	Bye	7:31.09
7	Lex Redelé	Netherlands	7:32.24	7:32.93	Did not advance
8	Jorma Kortelainen	Finland	7:39.51	7:32.95	Did not advance
9	David Meineke	South Africa	7:37.11	7:37.94	Did not advance
10	Hugo Waser	Switzerland	7:34.67	7:42.00	Did not advance
11	Horst Fink	Austria	7:43.53	7:47.09	Did not advance
12	Sidney Rand	Great Britain	7:46.98	7:50.31	Did not advance
13	Julio Lopez	Spain	8:13.94	8:11.40	Did not advance
