= Gerhard Häge =

German rower

Personal information
- Born: 1928 or 1929
- Died: 1970 (age 41) Spain

Sport
- Sport: Rowing
- Club: Ruderverein "Neptun" in Konstanz
Medal record
Men's rowing
Representing West Germany
European Rowing Championships
Gold medal – first place	1954 Amsterdam	Double sculls

Gerhard Häge (also known as Haege; 1928/29–1970) was a West German rower. Together with Thomas Schneider, he won the first European medal for the once dominant rowing nation after the Second World War.

Häge was born in 1928 or 1929. Rowing trainer Ludwig Marquardt discovered the young rower from Ulm and got him to join the Ruderverein "Neptun" in Konstanz. For the 1954 rowing season, Marquardt looked for another rower to form a double scull boat with Häge and found Schneider from the Rudergesellschaft Gießen. The scullers won a regatta in Hanover, a three-nation contest in Klagenfurt, and then the German national championships in Hanover. This qualified them for the 1954 European Rowing Championships, held shortly later in Amsterdam, where they won gold in the double sculls. This was the first medal for Germany after the war and was thus the reason for much celebration for the once dominant rowing nation. In December 1954, Häge and Schneider received the Silbernes Lorbeerblatt, Germany's highest sports award, from the nation's president Theodor Heuss.

At the 1955 German national championships in Berlin, Schneider and Häge were beaten by Manfred Rulffs and Klaus von Fersen.

Häge later married Margret, another rower from his club, and they had four daughters. On a holiday in Spain in 1970, a tyre of their car blew out and they fell off a bridge. Häge died in the crash, but his wife and their four daughters survived.
