= Rebek =

Rebek is a surname. Notable people with the surname include:

- Jeremy Rebek (born 1976), Canadian-born Austrian ice hockey player
- Julius Rebek (born 1944), Hungarian-American chemist
- Savino Rebek (1940–2026), Italian rower

== See also ==
- Rebec, a musical instrument
