= Vyacheslav Ivanov (rower) =

Soviet rower (1938–2024)

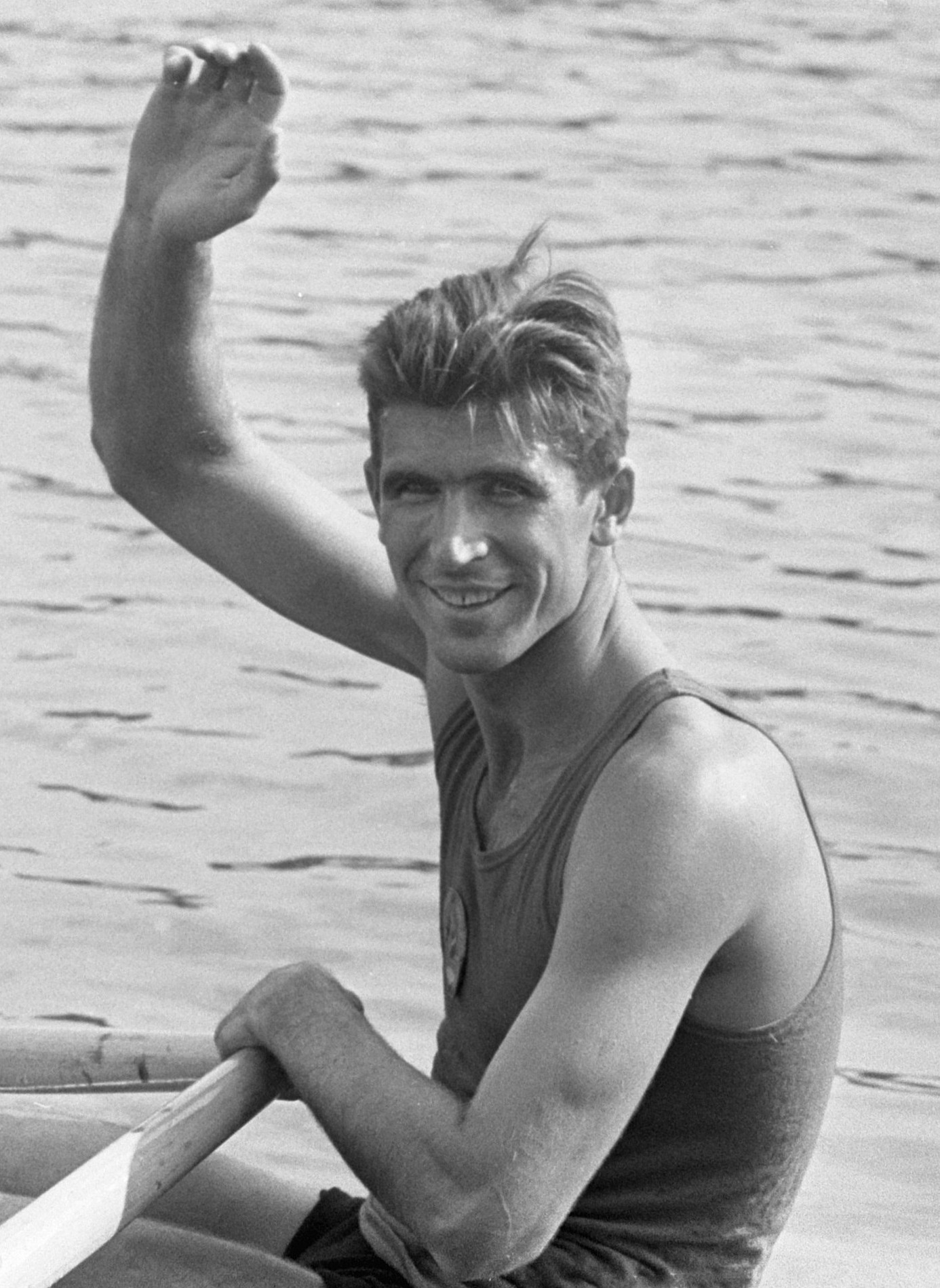
- Ivanov at the 1964 European Championships

Personal information
- Born: Vyacheslav Nikolayevich Ivanov; 30 July 1938 Moscow, Russian SFSR, USSR
- Died: 5 August 2024 (aged 86) Moscow, Russia
- Height: 1.88 m (6 ft 2 in)
- Weight: 85 kg (187 lb)

Sport
- Sport: Rowing
- Club: Krasnoye Znamya/CSKA, Moscow
- Coached by: I. Ya. Demyanov; Arkady Nikolayev
Medal record
Representing the Soviet Union
Olympic Games
Gold medal – first place	1956 Melbourne	Single sculls
Gold medal – first place	1960 Rome	Single sculls
Gold medal – first place	1964 Tokyo	Single sculls
World Championships
Gold medal – first place	1962 Lucerne	Single sculls
European Championships
Gold medal – first place	1956 Bled	Single sculls
Bronze medal – third place	1957 Duisburg	Single sculls
Bronze medal – third place	1958 Poznań	Single sculls
Gold medal – first place	1959 Mâcon	Single sculls
Gold medal – first place	1961 Prague	Single sculls
Gold medal – first place	1964 Amsterdam	Single sculls
Silver medal – second place	1967 Vichy	Single sculls
Diamond Challenge Sculls
Silver medal – second place	1957 Henley-on-Thames	Single sculls
Silver medal – second place	1958 Henley-on-Thames	Single sculls
Gold Cup Challenge
Gold medal – first place	1956 Philadelphia	Single sculls
Gold medal – first place	1958 Philadelphia	Single sculls
Gold medal – first place	1960 Philadelphia	Single sculls
Gold medal – first place	1962 Philadelphia	Single sculls

Vyacheslav Nikolayevich Ivanov (Russian: Вячеслав Николаевич Иванов; 30 July 1938 – 5 August 2024) was a Soviet rower, and one of the most accomplished rowers of his generation. He rowed for the Soviet Union, and he won the Olympic gold medals in the single sculls class at the 1956 Melbourne Games, the 1960 Rome Games, and the 1964 Tokyo Games.

Ivanov was the first man to win the single sculls event three times in the Olympics. At the time, only Americans Jack Kelly Sr. and Paul Costello and Briton Jack Beresford had won three Olympic gold medals in the sport of rowing (since surpassed by Steve Redgrave and others). The only other person to match Ivanov's achievement and win three gold medals in the single scull is Finland's Pertti Karppinen.

His fierce rivalry with Stuart Mackenzie turned in to a lifelong friendship until Mackenzie’s passing, as was documented in Ivanov’s autobiography. In the last few pages of his book, Ivanov wrote the following about Mackenzie when they reunited again at Henley Royal Regatta in 2010: “I looked at Stuart and suddenly realised that this elderly foreigner whom I have not seen for almost 50 years and whom I might never see again, who used to drive me crazy and whom I almost hated once, is actually very dear to me. In some respects, and in his own way, he might be the closest friend I have.”

== Rowing career ==
Ivanov started as a boxer, in 1950. In 1952, he combined boxing with rowing, eventually opting for the latter sport. By 1955, at the age of 17, he won the USSR junior championships and finished third in the senior championships, beating the Olympic single scull champion Yuriy Tyukalov. In 1956, he won his first Soviet and European titles and an Olympic gold medal. At the Olympics he was placing fourth at the 1500 meter mark. With only 500 meters left, he began a devastating sprint, catching Teodor Kocerka, Jack Kelly Jr., and then Mackenzie who had been leading the race. At the award ceremony, excited, Ivanov dropped his gold medal into Lake Wendouree, where the race took place. His diving attempts to rescue the medal failed, and the IOC later provided him with a replacement.

After the Olympics, Mackenzie consistently defeated Ivanov at the Henley Royal Regatta and at the European Rowing Championships in 1957 and 1958. Disappointed by his losses, Ivanov was considering retirement, but was brought back to shape by his coach Arkady Nikolayev. In 1959 Ivanov regained the European title. He also set a world best time of 6:58.8 for a 2000 m single scull race, becoming the first person to break the seven-minute barrier.

At the 1960 Olympics, Ivanov won again with a blistering sprint, defeating Achim Hill by more than 6 seconds. Mackenzie withdrew because of illness before being rushed into a hospital for a stomach operation. In 1962, Ivanov won the first ever World Rowing Championship, defeating Mackenzie and Seymour Cromwell. At the 1963 European Rowing Championships, he came fourth. Ivanov faced Hill again at the 1964 Olympics. This time he trailed Hill by 7 seconds with 500 m to go, but finished 3.73 seconds ahead owing to his trademark sprint. Ivanov missed the 1965 European Rowing Championships due to illness. Ivanov was hoping to compete at the 1968 Olympics, but was left out of the Soviet team in favor of a younger rower (Viktor Melnikov). Melnikov failed to reach the Olympic final, while Ivanov retired next year.

In addition to the Olympics, Ivanov won 11 Soviet single scull titles (1956–1966) and 4 European titles. He was awarded the Order of the Red Banner of Labour (1960) and two Orders of the Badge of Honour (1957 and 1965).

== Life after retirement ==
In 1960, at the peak of his rowing career, Ivanov graduated from a military school, and in 1969 received his master's degree from the Volgograd Institute of Physical Education. After retiring from competitions he served as a Soviet Navy officer and retired in the rank of captain. He then resumed competing in rowing in the masters category.

Ivanov died on 5 August 2024, at the age of 86.

== Publications ==
- Вячеслав Николаевич Иванов (2010). Ветры олимпийских озер. Ассоциация любителей гребного спорта. ISBN 978-5-903274-40-6.
