= Head of the Schuylkill Regatta =

American rowing race

HOSR
- The Head of the Schuylkill Regatta
- Date: Last weekend of October
- Location: Philadelphia
- Event type: Head Race
- Distance: 2.5 miles (4.0 km)
- Established: 1874
- Organizer: University Barge Club
- Website: www.hosr.org
- Participants: 8,000 entries; 272 clubs

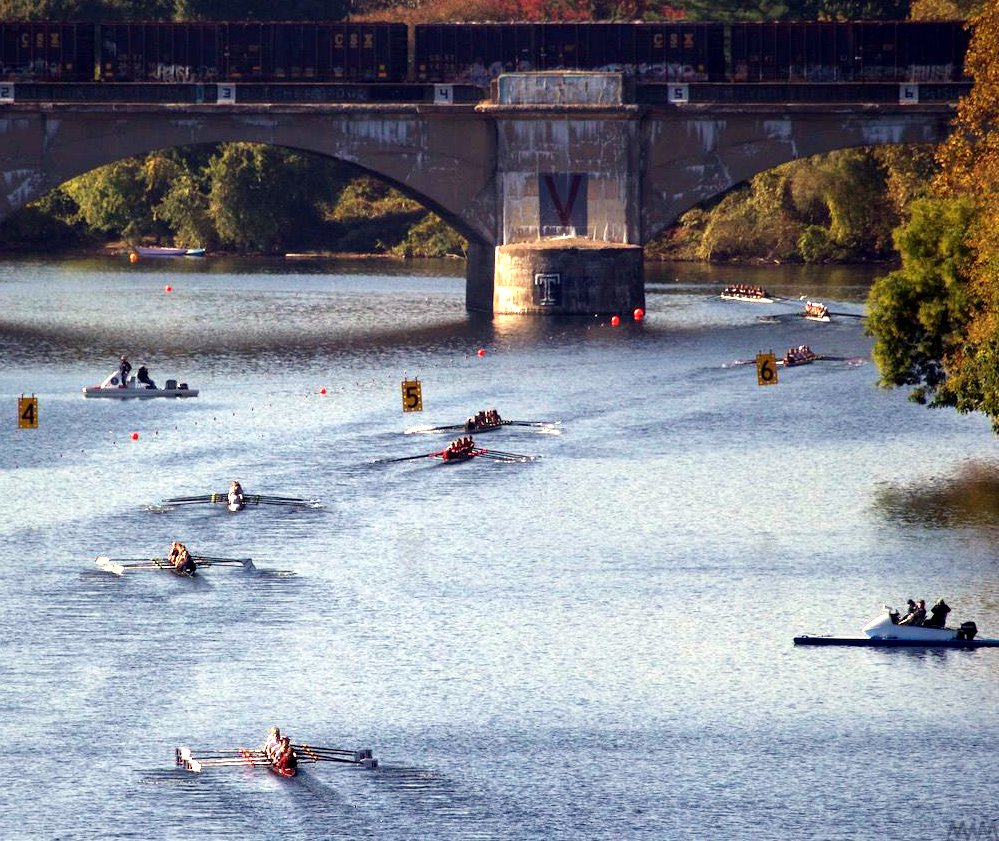

The Thomas Eakins Head of the Schuylkill Regatta (also known as the HOSR or the HOS) is a rowing race held annually during the last weekend in October on the Schuylkill River in Philadelphia, Pennsylvania. The HOSR is the final race in the Fall Fury series, which includes the Head of the Ohio and the Head of the Connecticut. Along with the Head of the Charles and the Head of the Connecticut, the HOSR is considered one of the three “fall classics.” The HOSR is one of the marquee races in the Philadelphia Classic Regatta Series, which also includes the Stotesbury Cup Regatta, the Philadelphia Scholastic Rowing Championship, the Schuylkill Navy Regatta, and the Independence Day Regatta.

Regattas such as the Head of the Charles in Boston and the Head of the Schuylkill in Philadelphia are to the rowing world what the New York Marathon and the Boston Marathon are to running.

— Susan Saint Sing, The Eight: A Season in the Tradition of Harvard Crew

== History ==
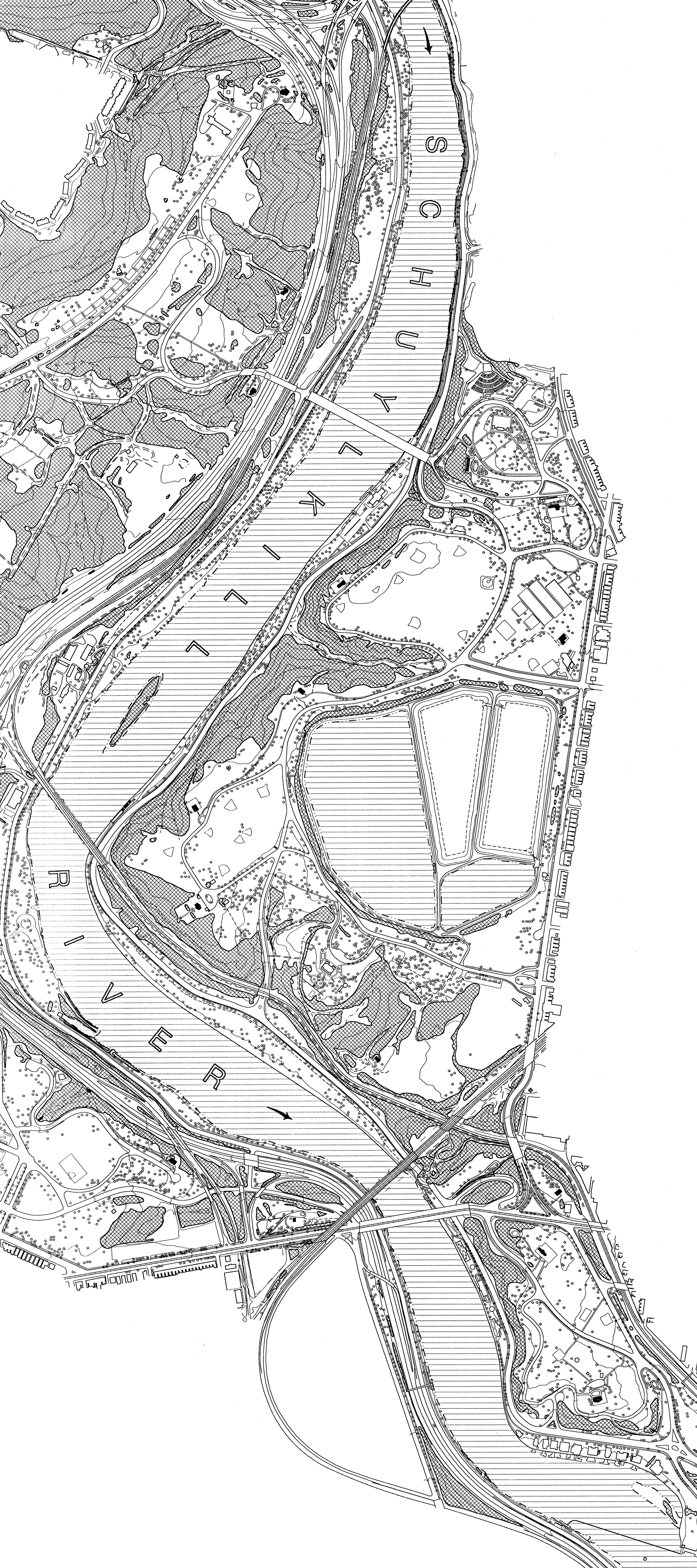
Schuylkill River from race start to finish at Boathouse Row

The HOSR was first held in 1874. The regatta, as it exists now, was founded in 1971 by members of the University Barge Club, Joseph N. “J” Pattison IV and Olympic Rower, Lyman S.A. Perry.

Until recently, the event was the largest one-day rowing competition in the world. The HOSR became a two-day event in 2008. It is the largest regatta in Philadelphia. As of 2003, the HOSR was America's second largest regatta.

== Format and course ==
The HOSR is a head race, which is a time-trial competition where boats race in close succession from a rolling start. The rower or crew completing the course in the shortest time in their age, ability and boat-class category is deemed the winner.

The course stretches 2.5 miles (4.0 km) from the start to the finish at Boathouse Row and contains four bridges in total, which appear in this order from the start:

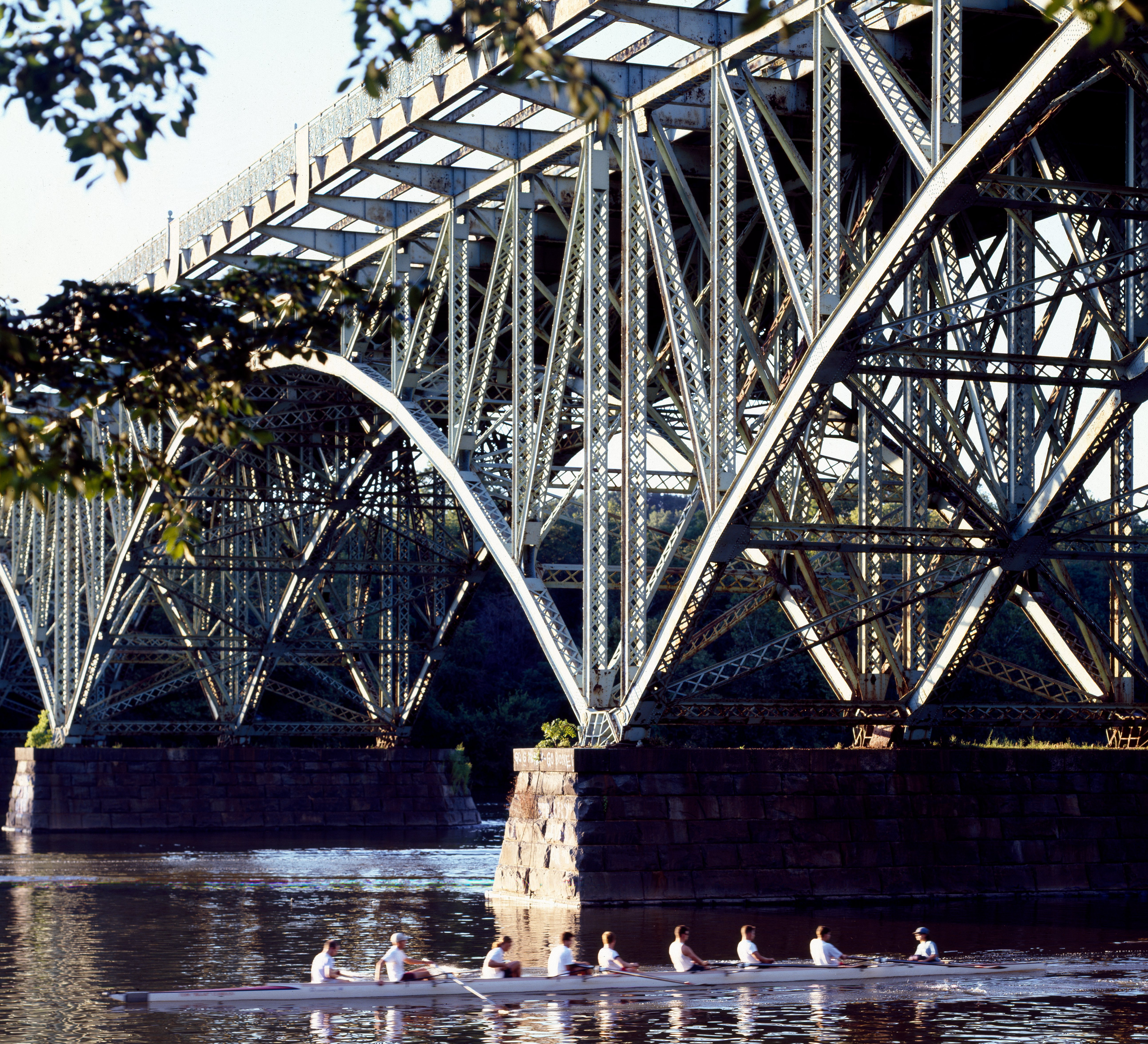
Strawberry Mansion Bridge

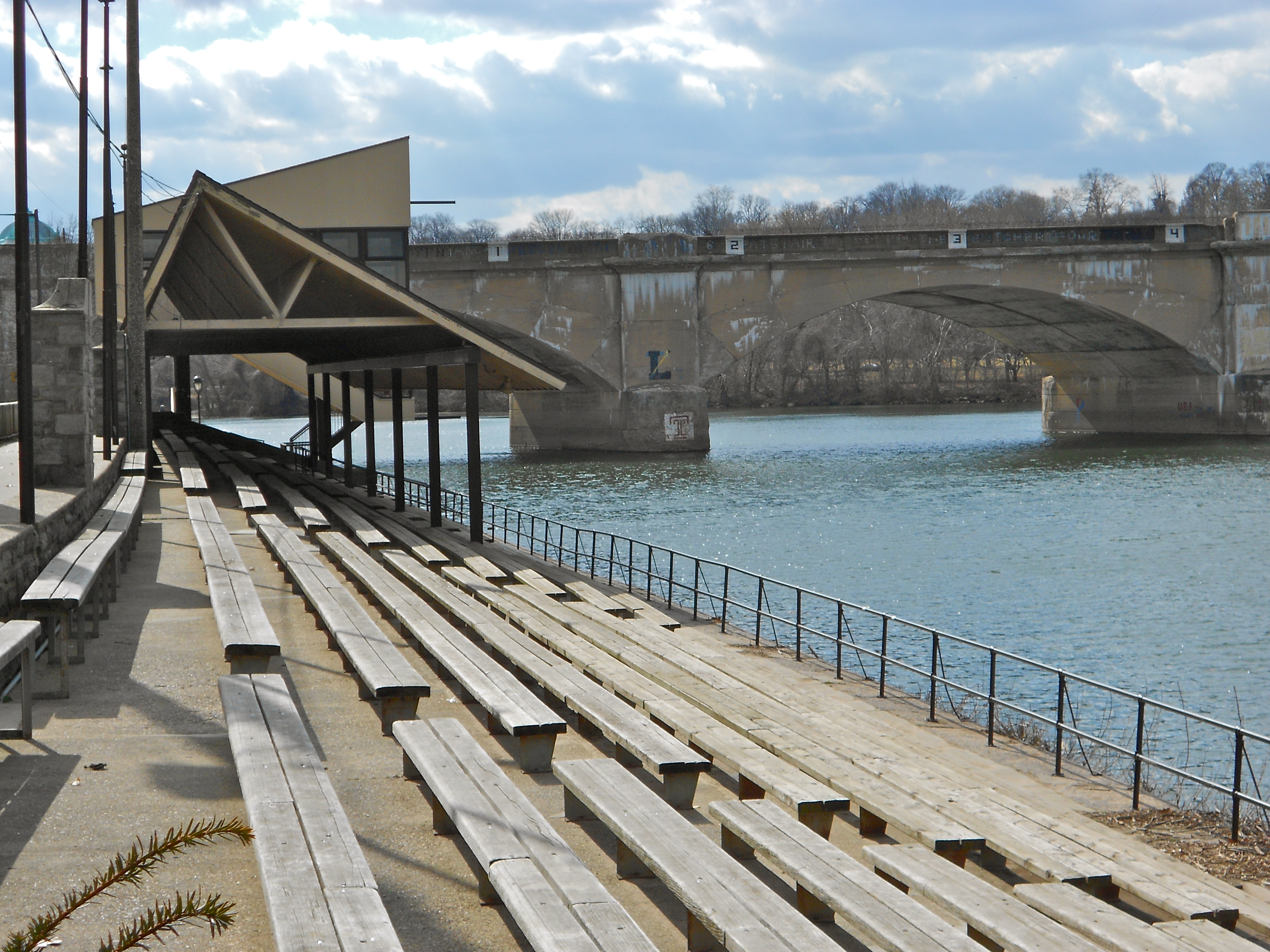
Columbia Railroad Bridge

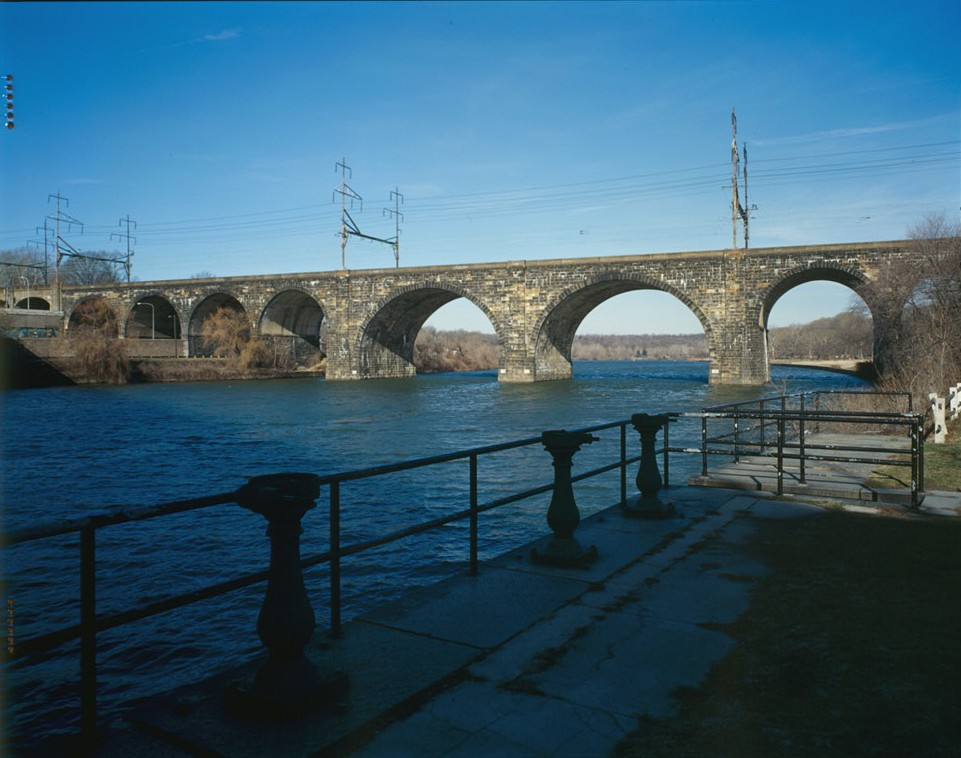
Amtrak Railroad Bridge

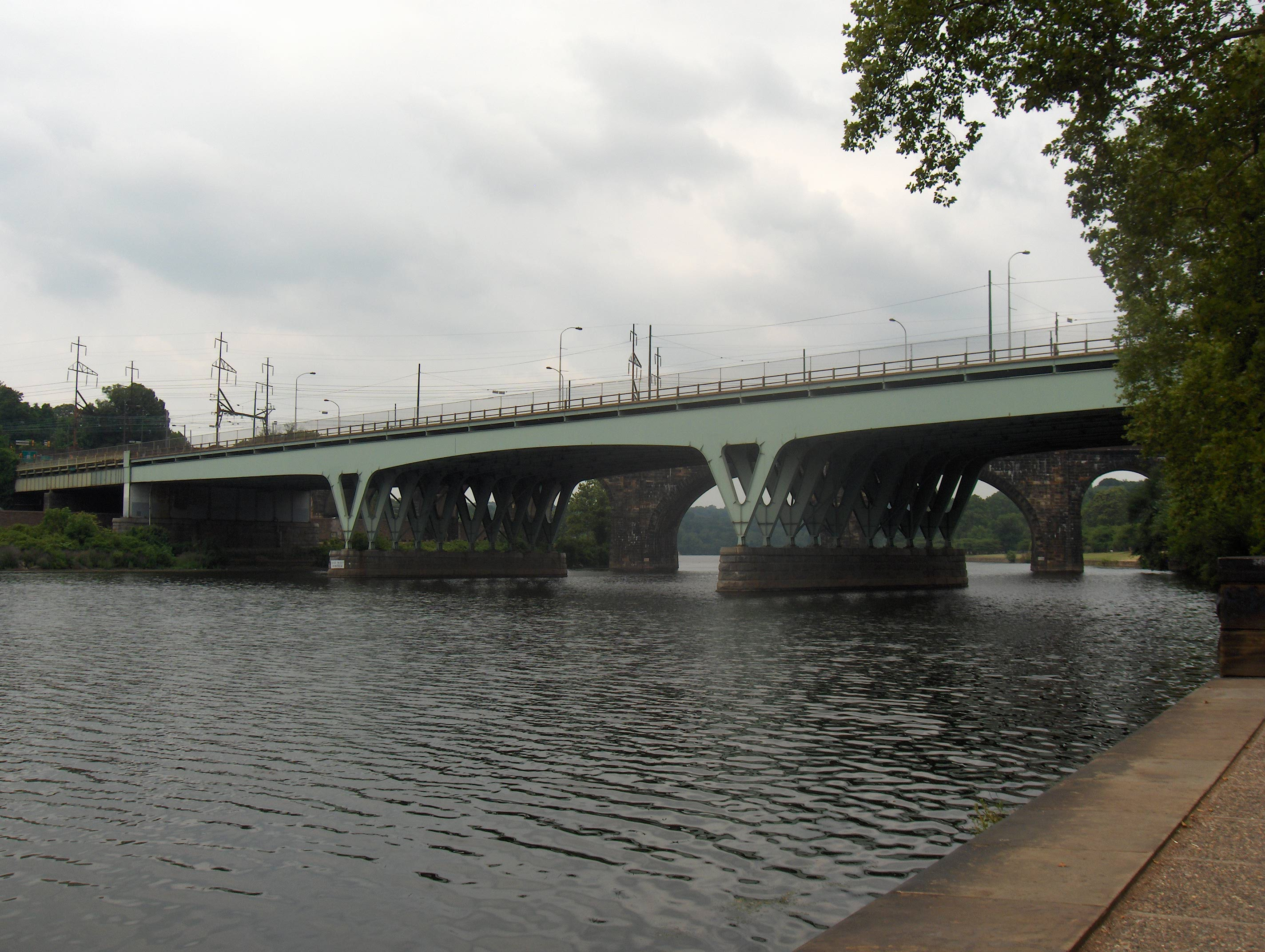
Girard Avenue Bridge

The Columbia Railroad Bridge is the most difficult part of the course because coxswains must make a sharp turn of nearly ninety degrees.

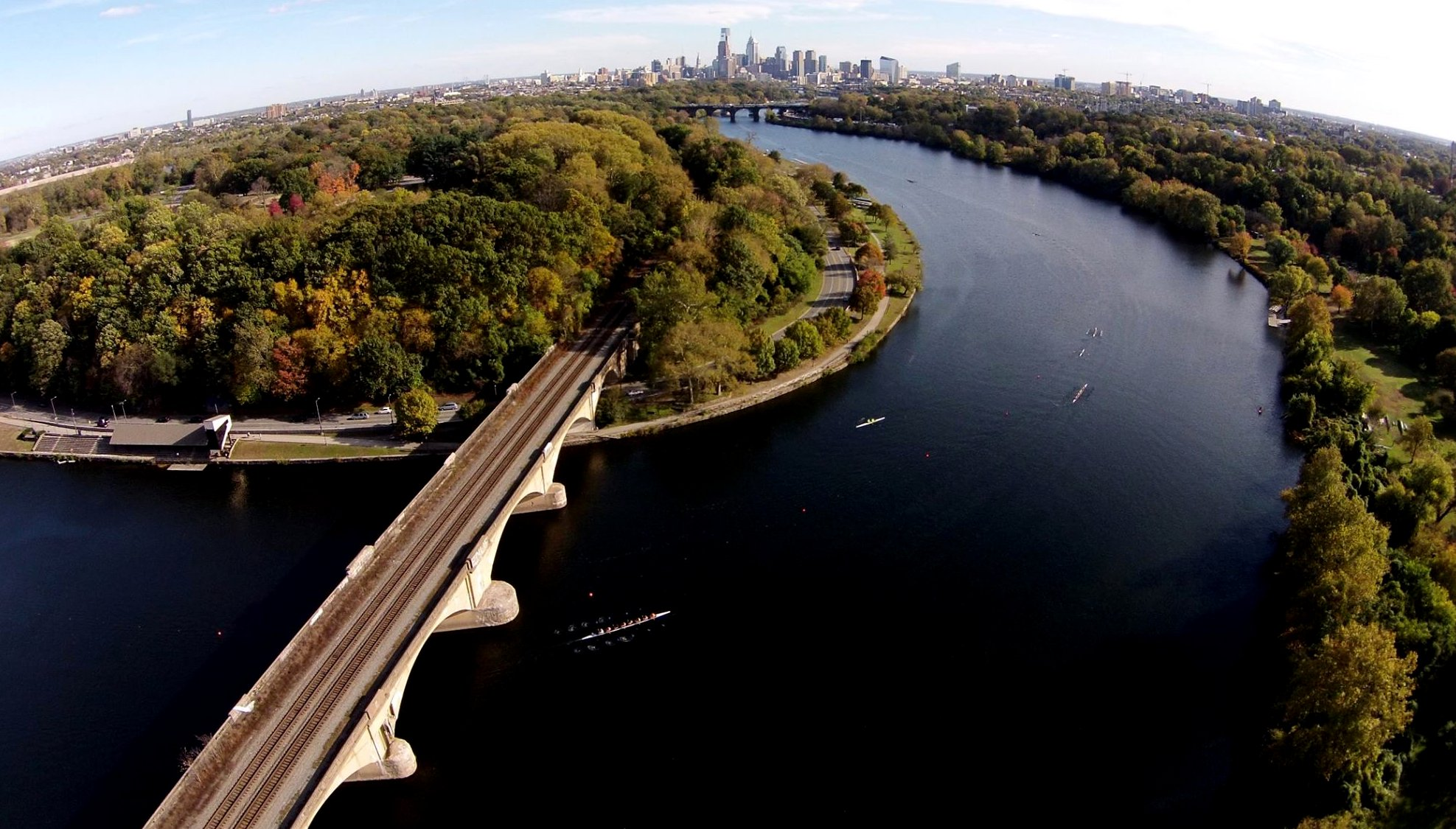
Columbia Bridge turn

Coming under the Columbia bridge is like the Weeks [Memorial Bridge] turn at the Charles. You want to be already turning before you get out of the bridge.

— NYAC coxswain Leigh Heyman, Rowing News

There is a dangerous waterfall less than 300 meters from the finish line across from Boathouse Row. The 13-foot Fairmount Water Works Dam stretches 400 meters across the Schuylkill.

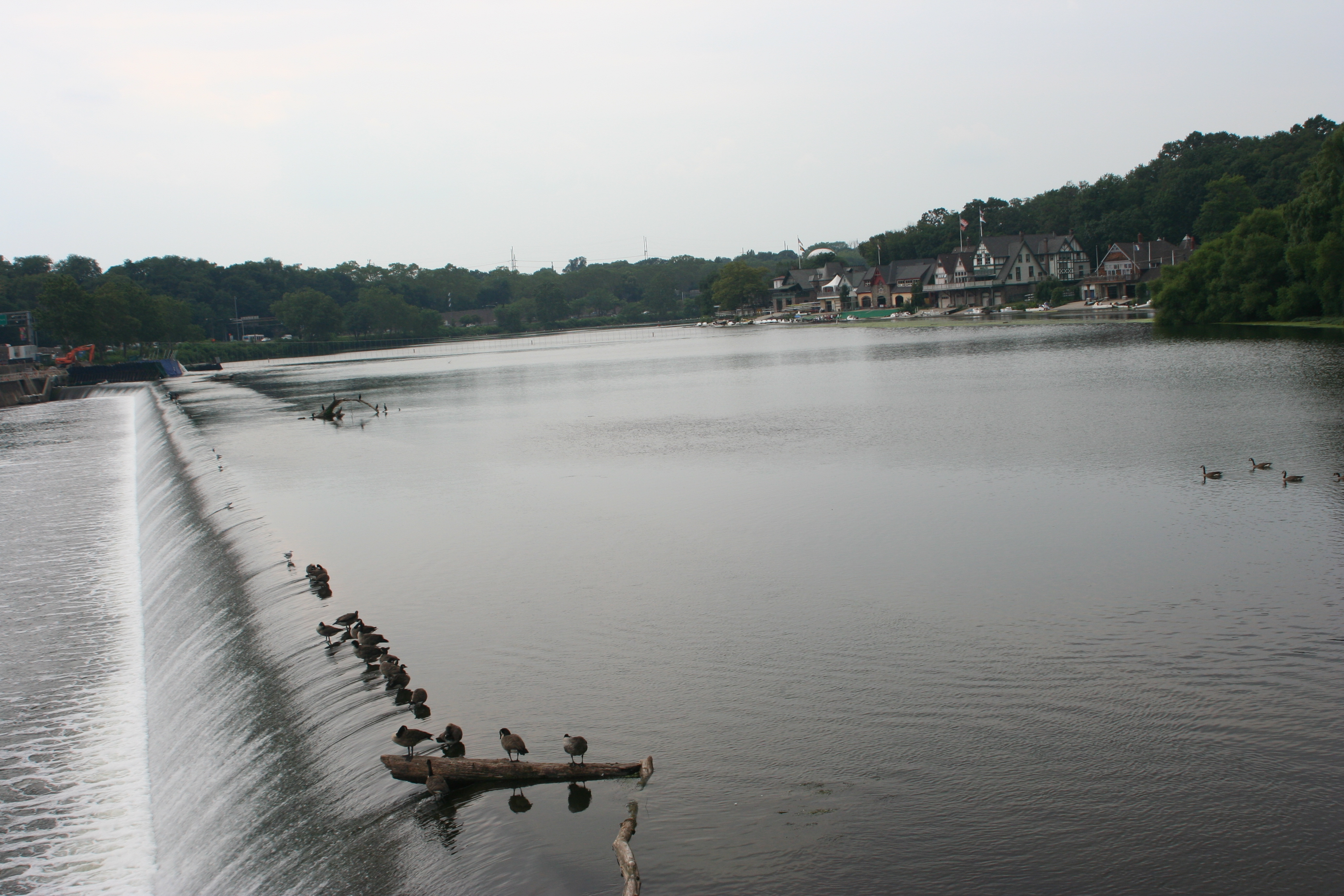

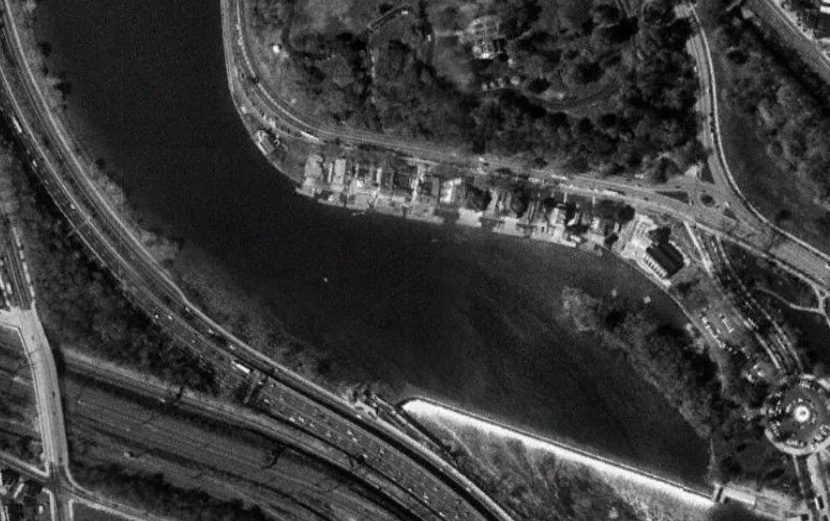

The dam is difficult for coxswains to see because it is so wide. A rowing shell caught broadside beyond the safety cable would easily be swept over the falls.

== Competitors ==
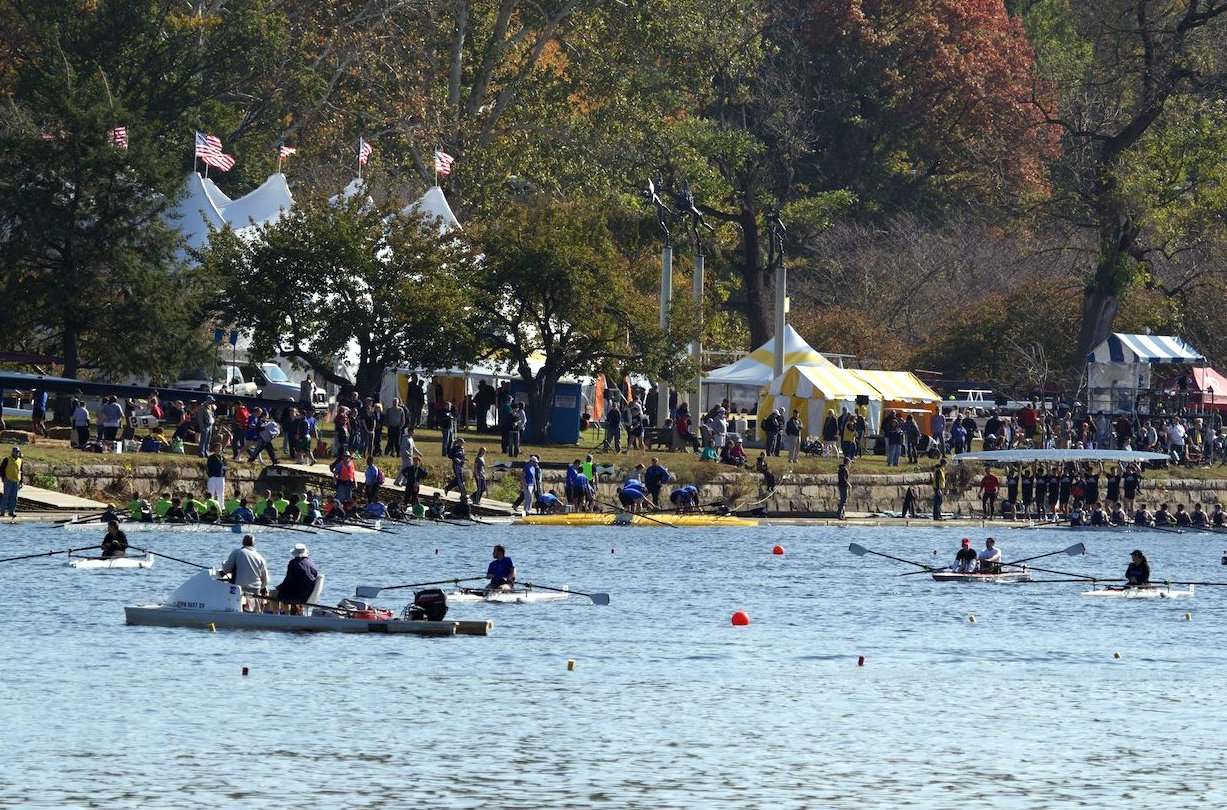

The regatta draws competitors from across the United States and internationally. Competing teams regularly hail from countries including:

Australia	Canada	France	Germany
Great Britain	Greece	Guatemala	Hong Kong
Ireland	Mexico	Peru	Russia

The HOSR is a fall championship regatta for many regional schools. The regatta sets itself apart with an expanded schedule of small boats and a field of quads "deep enough to do justice to Philadelphia’s rich sculling heritage." The Head of the Schuylkill is a self-described "inclusive regatta." However, it also attracts top world-class athletes. Recent competitors include:

- Victoria Opitz, world record W8+
- Kerry Simmonds, world record W8+
- Esther Lofgren, Olympic gold medalist W8+

== Points trophies ==
Since 2010, the HOSR has awarded points trophies in high school, college, open and masters categories for overall team points and by gender. Only twelve programs have won the overall points trophy:

=== Overall ===
College

- Drexel University (2010–2014, 2019, 2022)
- University of Pennsylvania (2015–2019)
- Villanova University (2014) (tied with Drexel)

Open

- Penn AC (2010, 2017, 2022)
- Vesper Boat Club (2011–2016, 2018–2019, 2021)

Masters

- Penn AC (2022)
- Saugatuck Rowing Association (2021)
- Vesper Boat Club (2010–2019)

High school

- Row America Rye (2014, 2016–2018, 2021–2022)
- Oak Neck Rowing Academy (2019)
- Saugatuck Rowing Association (2012–2013, 2015)
- Connecticut Boat Club (2010–2011)

=== By gender ===
Year	College women	College men	Masters women	Masters men	Open women	Open men	High school women	High school men	Ref.
2010	Holy Cross/Trinity	Drexel	Vesper	Malta	Penn AC	Penn AC	Connecticut	St. Joe's Prep	
2011	Drexel/Villanova	Drexel/Princeton	Vesper	Potomac/Malta	Vesper	Penn AC	Connecticut	St. Joe's Prep/Crescent	
2012	Michigan State	Princeton	Vesper	Fairmount/Malta	Vesper	Malta/Potomac/Vesper	Saugatuck	Crescent	
2013	Old Dominion/Drexel	Drexel	Vesper	University	Vesper	Penn AC/Undine	Sagamore	Norwalk River	
2014	Bucknell	Drexel	Vesper	Undine	Vesper	Potomac	Notre Dame/ Saugatuck	Norwalk River	
2015	UPenn	UPenn	Vesper	Fairmount	Vesper	Vesper	Saugatuck	Saugatuck	
2016	UPenn	UPenn	Vesper	Undine	Vesper	Penn AC	Saugatuck	East End/ Malvern/ Whitemarsh	
2017	UPenn	UPenn	Vesper	Fairmount	Potomac	Penn AC	RowAmerica Rye	RowAmerica Rye	
2018	UPenn	Navy/ UPenn	Vesper	Fairmount	Vesper	Penn AC	RowAmerica Rye	RowAmerica Rye	
2019	UPenn	Drexel	Vesper	Fairmount	Vesper	Vesper	Princeton NRA	Oak Neck	
2020*	–	–	–	–	–	–	–	–	
2021*	Georgetown	Dartmouth	Whitemarsh	Fairmount	Vesper	Dartmouth	RowAmerica Rye	RowAmerica Rye	
2022	Drexel	Drexel	Vesper	Penn AC	Drexel	Undine	RowAmerica Rye	Notre Dame	

== Philadelphia Gold Cup Challenge ==
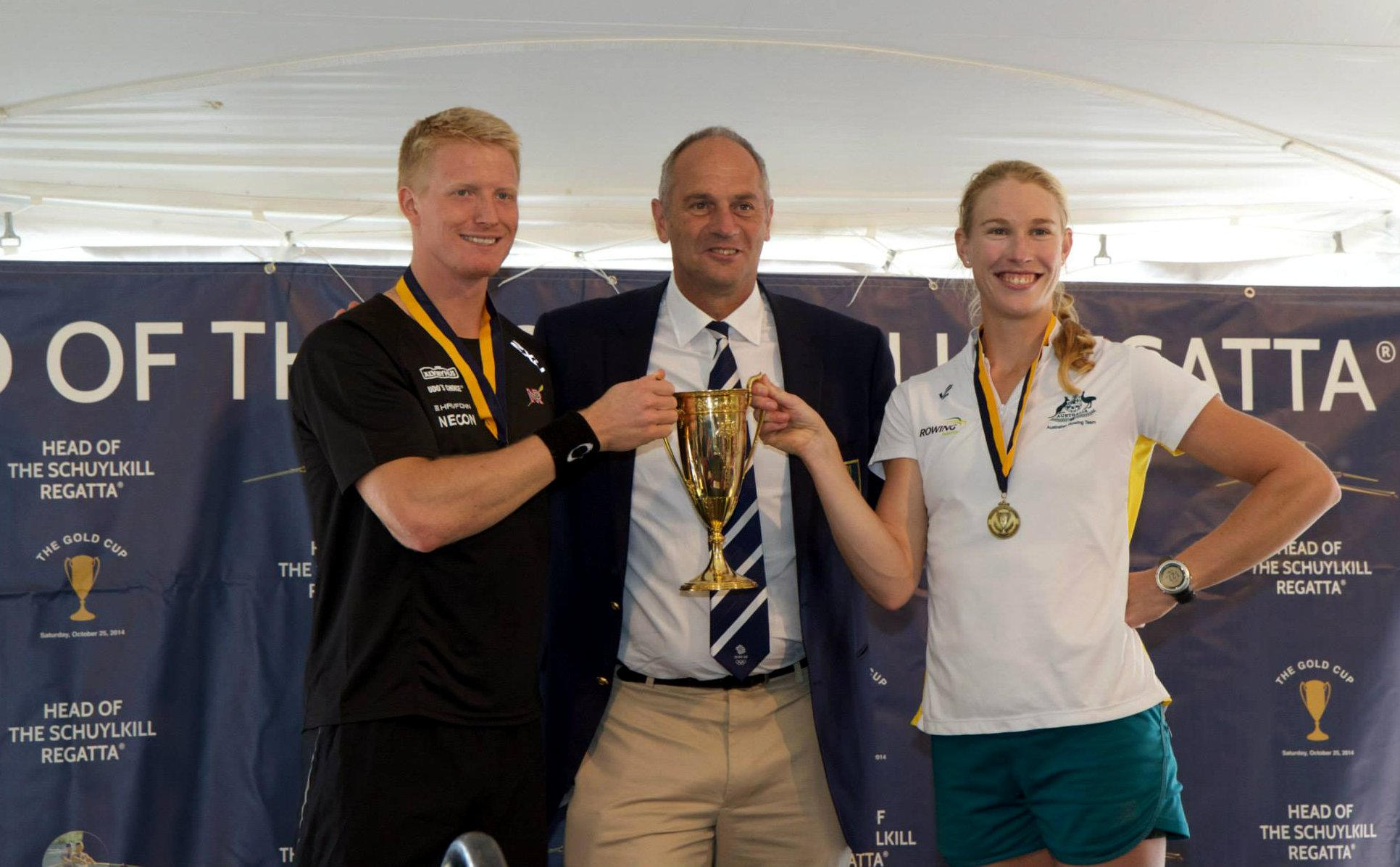
2014 Winners Kjetil Borch and Kim Brennan being presented with the Gold Cup by Sir Steve Redgrave

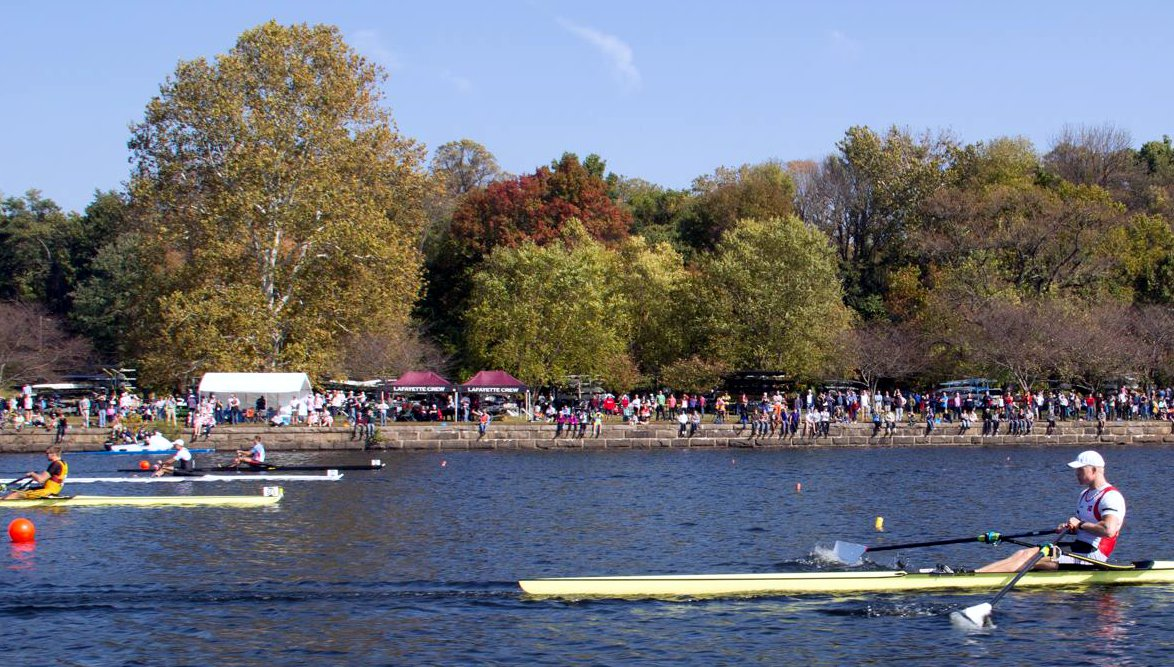
Kjetil Borch out in front of Mahé Drysdale, Ondřej Synek and Yohann Rigogne

The Philadelphia Challenge Cup, known as "The Gold Cup", began during the heyday of Philadelphia rowing and pitted the best amateur male single scullers in the world against each other in a sprint race on the famed Schuylkill River. In 1920, J. Elliot Newlin, the Commodore of the Schuylkill Navy and head of the Philadelphia Challenge Cup Committee, presented the Gold Cup to its first winner, John B. Kelly Sr. from Vesper Boat Club.

The Gold Cup was originally created by a popular subscription of more than $2,500, and was to be to rowing what the Davis Cup is to tennis. Its founding followed Mr. Kelly's winning the 1920 Olympics single sculls and the Henley Royal Regatta barring him from competing in the Diamond Challenge Sculls on the grounds he had been a brick layer, which meant he "wasn't a gentleman" and was therefore ineligible to compete as an amateur.

Year	Winner	Country	Ref.
1920	John B. Kelly Sr.	United States (Vesper)	
1922	Walter M. Hoover	United States (Duluth Boat Club)	
1923	W.E. Garrett Gilmore	United States (Bachelors)	
1924	Paul V. Costello	United States (Vesper)	
1924	Jack Beresford	England	
1925	Jack Beresford	England	
1928	H. R. Pearce	Australia	
1935	Charles A. Campbell	Canada (Argonaut Rowing Club)	
1936	Gustav Schaefer	Germany	
1940	Joe Burk	United States (Penn AC)	
1948	Mervyn Wood	Australia	
1950	Mervyn Wood	Australia	
1952	Yuriy Tyukalov	Soviet Union	
1956	Vyacheslav Ivanov	Soviet Union	
1958	Vyacheslav Ivanov	Soviet Union	
1960	Vyacheslav Ivanov	Soviet Union	
1962	Vyacheslav Ivanov	Soviet Union	
1964	Vyacheslav Ivanov	Soviet Union	
1966	Donald Spero	United States (NYAC)	

The Gold Cup mysteriously disappeared, ending the competition in the 1960s, only to reemerge in 2011 after a 50-year hiatus, with the expansion of the competition to women. The race is held on a 750-meter course at the Head of the Schuylkill Regatta. In 2019, the Gold Cup became its own event, racing every year on the Cooper River.

Year	Men's winner	Country	Women's winner	Country	Ref.
2011	Iztok Čop	Slovenia	Miroslava Knapková	Czech Republic	
2014	Kjetil Borch	Norway	Kim Brennan	Australia	
2015	Kjetil Borch	Norway	Kim Brennan	Australia	
2016	Damir Martin	Croatia	Kim Brennan	Australia	
2018	Robbie Manson	New Zealand	Hannah Osborne	New Zealand	
