= Joe Burk =

American oarsman and coach (1914–2008)

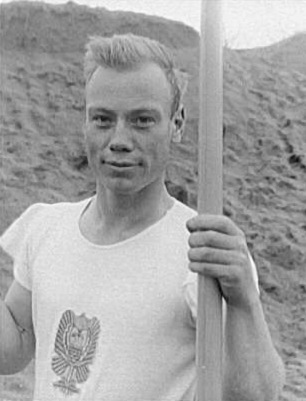

Personal information
- Born: Joseph William Burk; January 19, 1914
- Died: January 13, 2008 (aged 93) Scottsdale, Arizona
- Education: Moorestown High School

Sport
- Club: Penn AC
Medal record
Men's Rowing
Representing United States
Diamond Challenge Sculls
Gold medal – first place	1939 Henley-on-Thames	Single sculls
Gold medal – first place	1938 Henley-on-Thames	Single sculls
Gold Cup Challenge
Gold medal – first place	1940 Philadelphia	Single sculls

Joseph William Burk (January 19, 1914 – January 13, 2008) was an American oarsman and coach.

Raised in Delanco Township, New Jersey, he graduated from Moorestown High School in 1930.

At the University of Pennsylvania, Burk rowed in the varsity boats. After graduating in 1934, he began racing in the single scull (1x), a one-man boat. Burk won 46 consecutive races in the single scull from 1937 to 1940, inclusive. He was the U.S. and Canadian champion for those four years. In 1938, he won the Diamond Challenge Sculls (the premier singles sculls event) at the Henley Royal Regatta when he set a Henley course record of 8:02, which was to stand for 27 years. He won Diamonds again in 1939, beating Roger Verey in the final. He became known as the "world's greatest oarsman", and at the end of the 1939 season, Burk was voted the James E. Sullivan Award as the country's outstanding amateur athlete.

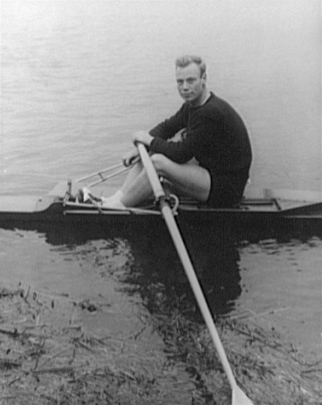
Portrait of Joe Burk taken by Carl Van Vechten in 1940.

In 1940, Burk won the Olympic try-outs, the National Regatta and the Philadelphia Challenge Cup, also known as the Gold Cup. The 1940 Olympics, however, were cancelled because of World War II. An attempt was made to schedule a match race with world professional sculling champion Bobby Pearce, who was then living in Canada, but that race failed to materialize.

Burk served as a PT boat commander in the Pacific in World War II. On March 29, 1943, he was assigned to the Commander Motor Torpedo Squadron Twenty-One, Navy Yard, New York City for outfitting. He was an ensign at the time. He was awarded the Navy Cross for his efforts. At the time of the award he was a Lieutenant (j.g.).

Burk began to coach the Yale University freshman crew in 1946. In 1950 he became coach of the University of Pennsylvania varsity crew and remained at that post until 1969. His crews won numerous championships and honors, including all cup races in the U.S. and the Grand Challenge Cup at the Henley Royal Regatta in 1955 and the Intercollegiate Rowing Association championship in 1967, 1968 and 1969. In 1968 the Penn crew (with the addition of some alumni) came within four one-hundredths [4/100] of a second of beating Harvard in the finals of the Olympic trials for the right to go to the 1968 Summer Olympics.

At Penn, Burk coached Harry Parker, both as an undergraduate, and afterwards as a sculler. Parker represented the United States at the 1960 Summer Olympics in the single scull and later became the head coach for Harvard. Parker would train by doing workouts with Burk in an opposing boat. Parker has stated that he never remembers beating Burk in practice even though Burk was 20 years his senior.

The Burk Cup, awarded annually to the winner of the rowing race between Penn and Northeastern, is named after him.

Burk died in Scottsdale, Arizona, on January 13, 2008, just short of his 94th birthday.

== Awards ==
- 1938 and 1939 Diamond Scull, Henley Royal Regatta
- James E. Sullivan Award 1939
- US Rowing Hall of Fame, Single Scull (elected 1956)
- US Rowing Hall of Fame, 1955 Penn Crew (coach) (elected 1977)
