= Rowing at the 1956 Summer Olympics – Men's single sculls =

Olympic rowing event

Men's single sculls at the Games of the XVI Olympiad
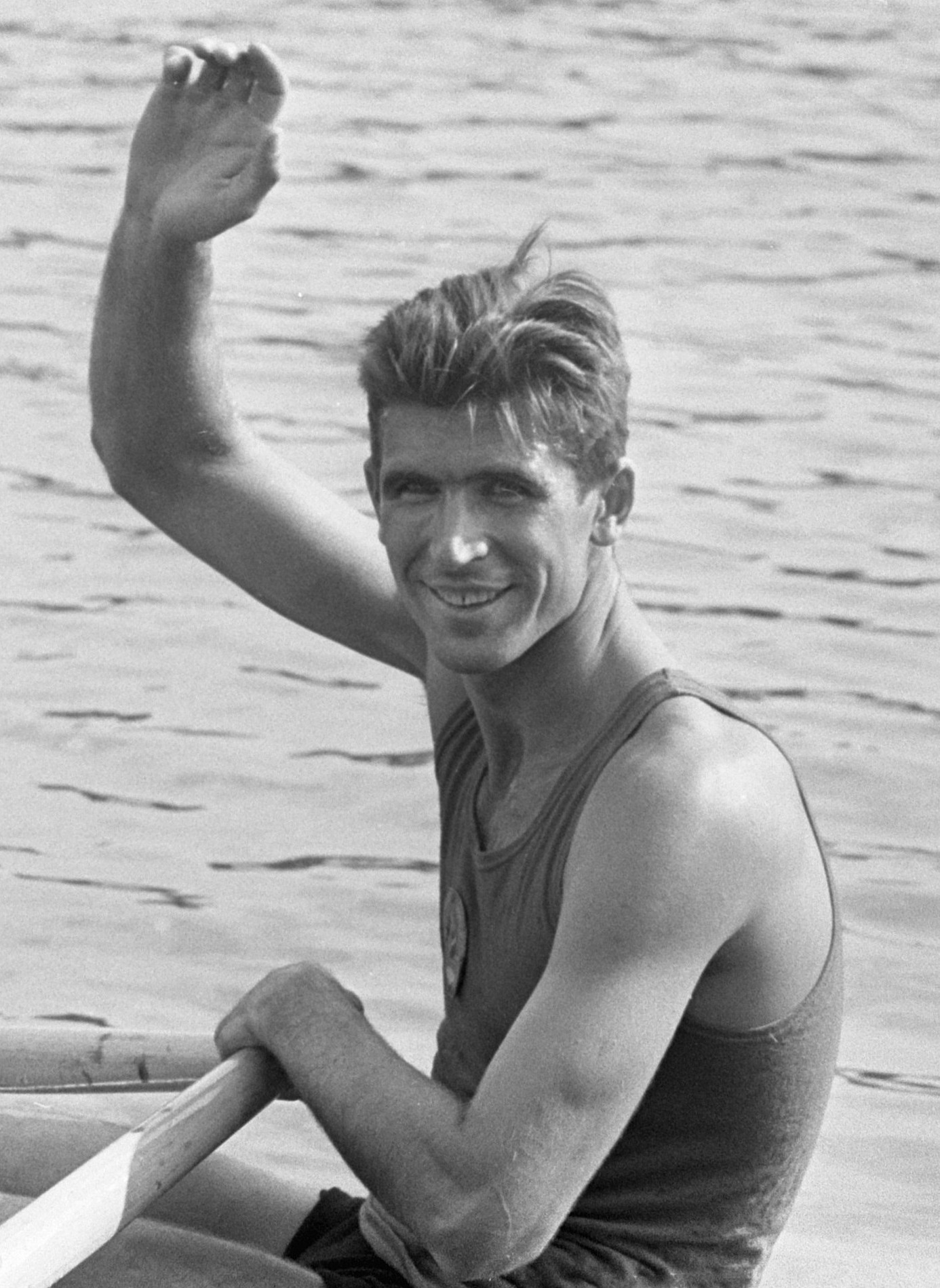
- Gold medalist Vyacheslav Ivanov (1964)
- Venue: Lake Wendouree
- Dates: 23–27 November 1956
- Competitors: 12 from 12 nations
- Winning time: 8:02.5

Medalists
1st place, gold medalist(s)		Vyacheslav Ivanov; Soviet Union
2nd place, silver medalist(s)		Stuart Mackenzie; Australia
3rd place, bronze medalist(s)		John B. Kelly Jr. United States

The men's single sculls competition at the 1956 Summer Olympics took place at Lake Wendouree, Ballarat, Australia. The event was held from 23 to 27 November. There were 12 competitors from 12 nations, with each nation limited to a single boat in the event. The event was won by Vyacheslav Ivanov of the Soviet Union, the nation's second consecutive victory in the men's single sculls Ivanov's first of his three consecutive Olympic titles. He was so thrilled when he was presented with his gold medal that he jumped up and down with joy-and dropped the medal into Lake Wendouree. He immediately dived into the lake to retrieve it, but could not find it. After the games were over he was given a replacement medal. Stuart Mackenzie took silver, making it the second consecutive Games with an Australian runner-up. American John B. Kelly Jr., after missing the finals in 1948 and 1952 by 0.4 seconds and 0.2 seconds respectively, reached the final and took the bronze medal this time.

== Background ==
This was the 12th appearance of the event. Rowing had been on the programme in 1896 but was cancelled due to bad weather. The single sculls has been held every time that rowing has been contested, beginning in 1900.

Three of the 18 single scullers from the 1952 Games returned: bronze medalist Teodor Kocerka of Poland, fourth-place finisher Tony Fox of Great Britain, and sixth-place finisher (and 1948 fourth-place finisher) John B. Kelly Jr. of the United States. Kocerka, who had also won the European championships in 1955 and the Diamond Challenge Sculls in 1955 and 1956, was the favorite. The challengers included 1956 European champion Vyacheslav Ivanov of the Soviet Union, 1953 European champion and 1954 Diamond Challenge winner Perica Vlašić of Yugoslavia, 1951 and 1953 Diamond Challenge winner Tony Fox of Great Britain, and Kelly.

Mexico made its debut in the event; East and West Germany competed together as the United Team of Germany for the first time. Great Britain made its 11th appearance, most among nations, having missed only the 1904 Games in St. Louis.

== Competition format ==
This rowing event was a single scull event, meaning that each boat was propelled by a single rower. The "scull" portion means that the rower used two oars, one on each side of the boat. The course used the 2000 metres distance that became the Olympic standard in 1912.

The competition dropped the second repechage after the semifinals, used in 1952. The tournament featured four rounds: quarterfinals, a repechage, semifinals, and a final.

- Quarterfinals: Three heats of 4 boats each. Top two boats in each heat advance to the semifinals, remaining boats to the repechage. No eliminations.
- Repechage: Two heats of 3 boats each. The winner of each heat rejoined the quarterfinal winners in the semifinals, with the remaining 4 boats (2nd and 3rd in each heat) eliminated.
- Semifinals: Two heats of 4 boats each. The top two boats in each heat advanced to the final, the remaining boats (4 total) were eliminated.
- Final: One heat of 4 boats.

== Schedule ==
All times are Australian Eastern Standard Time (UTC+10)

Date	Time	Round
Friday, 23 November 1956	11:00	Quarterfinals
Saturday, 24 November 1956	11:00	Repechage
Monday, 26 November 1956	11:00	Semifinals
Tuesday, 27 November 1956	15:30	Final

== Results ==
=== Quarterfinals ===
The quarterfinals were held on 23 November. The first two rowers in each heat advanced to the semifinals, while the others went to the repechage.

==== Quarterfinal 1 ====
Rank	Rower	Nation	Time	Notes
1	Vyacheslav Ivanov	Soviet Union	7:26.1	Q
2	Stuart Mackenzie	Australia	7:28.8	Q
3	James Hill	New Zealand	7:30.1	R
4	Ferdinand Rabeder	Austria	7:36.0	R

==== Quarterfinal 2 ====
Rank	Rower	Nation	Time	Notes
1	Perica Vlašić	Yugoslavia	7:31.3	Q
2	Klaus von Fersen	United Team of Germany	7:34.4	Q
3	Stefano Martinoli	Italy	7:36.5	R
4	Nikos Hatzigiakoumis	Greece	7:51.5	R

==== Quarterfinal 3 ====
Rank	Rower	Nation	Time	Notes
1	John B. Kelly Jr.	United States	7:24.8	Q
2	Teodor Kocerka	Poland	7:28.1	Q
3	Tony Fox	Great Britain	7:36.7	R
4	Jorge Roesler	Mexico	8:24.3	R

=== Repechage ===
The repechage round was held on 24 November, with three rowers for each repechage. The winner of the repechage is qualified for the semifinals.

==== Repechage heat 1 ====
Rank	Rower	Nation	Time	Notes
1	James Hill	New Zealand	8:29.9	Q
2	Nikos Hatzigiakoumis	Greece	11:00.4	
—	Jorge Roesler	Mexico	DNF	

==== Repechage heat 2 ====
Rank	Rower	Nation	Time	Notes
1	Stefano Martinoli	Italy	9:11.8	Q
2	Ferdinand Rabeder	Austria	9:16.4	
3	Tony Fox	Great Britain	9:31.6	

=== Semifinals ===
The semifinals were held on 26 November. The first two rowers in each semifinal advanced to the final.

==== Semifinal 1 ====
Rank	Rower	Nation	Time	Notes
1	Vyacheslav Ivanov	Soviet Union	9:02.7	Q
2	Teodor Kocerka	Poland	9:05.7	Q
3	James Hill	New Zealand	9:12.5	
4	Klaus von Fersen	United Team of Germany	9:23.2	

==== Semifinal 2 ====
Rank	Rower	Nation	Time	Notes
1	John B. Kelly Jr.	United States	9:12.5	Q
2	Stuart Mackenzie	Australia	9:19.5	Q
3	Perica Vlašić	Yugoslavia	9:32.2	
4	Stefano Martinoli	Italy	9:35.7	

=== Final ===
The final round of men's single sculls was held on 27 November.

Rank	Rower	Nation	Time
1st place, gold medalist(s)	Vyacheslav Ivanov	Soviet Union	8:02.5
2nd place, silver medalist(s)	Stuart Mackenzie	Australia	8:07.7
3rd place, bronze medalist(s)	John B. Kelly Jr.	United States	8:11.8
4	Teodor Kocerka	Poland	8:12.9

== Results summary ==
Rank	Rower	Nation	Quarterfinals	Repechage	Semifinals	Final
1st place, gold medalist(s)	Vyacheslav Ivanov	Soviet Union	7:26.1	Bye	9:02.7	8:02.5
2nd place, silver medalist(s)	Stuart Mackenzie	Australia	7:28.8	Bye	9:19.5	8:07.7
3rd place, bronze medalist(s)	John B. Kelly Jr.	United States	7:24.8	Bye	9:12.5	8:11.8
4	Teodor Kocerka	Poland	7:28.1	Bye	9:05.7	8:12.9
5	James Hill	New Zealand	7:30.1	8:29.9	9:12.5	Did not advance
6	Klaus von Fersen	United Team of Germany	7:34.4	Bye	9:23.2	Did not advance
7	Perica Vlašić	Yugoslavia	7:31.3	Bye	9:32.2	Did not advance
8	Stefano Martinoli	Italy	7:36.5	9:11.8	9:35.7	Did not advance
9	Ferdinand Rabeder	Austria	7:36.0	9:16.4	Did not advance	
10	Tony Fox	Great Britain	7:36.7	9:31.6	Did not advance	
11	Nikos Hatzigiakoumis	Greece	7:51.5	11:00.4	Did not advance	
12	Jorge Roesler	Mexico	8:24.3	DNF	Did not advance	
