= Thomas Schneider =

Thomas Schneider may refer to:

- Thomas Franklin Schneider (1859–1938), American architect
- Thomas Schneider (Australian footballer) (born 1992), Australian rules footballer
- Thomas Schneider (footballer) (born 1972), German manager and former footballer
- Thomas Schneider (Egyptologist) (born 1964), German Egyptologist
- Thomas Schneider (rower) (born 1932), West German rower
- Thomas Schneider (sprinter) (born 1988), German athlete
- Amy Schneider (born 1979), American writer and game show contestant
