= Thomas Schneider (rower) =

West German rower

Personal information
- Born: 30 March 1932 (age 94)

Sport
- Sport: Rowing
- Club: Gießener RG 1877
Medal record
Men's rowing
Representing West Germany
European Rowing Championships
Gold medal – first place	1954 Amsterdam	Double sculls
Silver medal – second place	1956 Bled	Double sculls
Silver medal – second place	1957 Duisburg	Double sculls
Bronze medal – third place	1958 Poznań	Double sculls

Thomas Schneider (born 30 March 1932) is a West German rower who represented the United Team of Germany. Together with Gerhard Häge, he won the first European medal for the once dominant rowing nation after World War II.

Schneider was born in 1932 and rowed for Gießener RG 1877 in Giessen. Rowing trainer Ludwig Marquardt enticed him to team up with Häge from the Ruderverein "Neptun" in Konstanz. The scullers won a regatta in Hanover, a three-nation contest in Klagenfurt, and then the German national championships in Hanover. This qualified them for the 1954 European Rowing Championships, held shortly after in Amsterdam, where they won gold in the double sculls. This was the first medal for Germany after the war and was thus the reason for much celebration for the once dominant rowing nation. In December 1954, Häge and Schneider received the Silbernes Lorbeerblatt, Germany's highest sports award, from the nation's Chancellor Theodor Heuss.

At the 1955 German national championships in Berlin, Schneider and Häge were beaten by Manfred Rulffs and Klaus von Fersen. Schneider then teamed up with Kurt Hipper and competed at the 1956 Summer Olympics in Melbourne with the men's double sculls where they came fourth.
