= Greece at the 1956 Summer Olympics =

- IOC code: GRE
- NOC: Committee of the Olympic Games

in Melbourne Australia/Stockholm Sweden
- Competitors: 13 in 5 sports
- Flag bearer: Georgios Roubanis
- Medals Ranked 35th: Gold 0 Silver 0 Bronze 1 Total 1

Summer Olympics appearances (overview)
- 1896; 1900; 1904; 1908; 1912; 1920; 1924; 1928; 1932; 1936; 1948; 1952; 1956; 1960; 1964; 1968; 1972; 1976; 1980; 1984; 1988; 1992; 1996; 2000; 2004; 2008; 2012; 2016; 2020; 2024

Other related appearances
- 1906 Intercalated Games

Greece competed at the 1956 Summer Olympics in Melbourne, Australia. Greek athletes have competed in every Summer Olympic Games. Thirteen competitors, all men, took part in thirteen events in five sports.

== Medalists ==
Medal	Name	Sport	Event	Date
Bronze	Georgios Roubanis	Athletics	Men's pole vault	26 November

== Athletics ==
Men's 110m Hurdles

- Ioannis Cambadellis

- Heat — 15.1s (→ did not advance)

== Rowing ==
Greece had one male rowers participate in one out of seven rowing events in 1956.

Men's single sculls

- Nikos Khatzigiakoumis

== Shooting ==
Two shooters represented Greece in 1956.

25 m pistol

- Vangelis Khrysafis

Trap

- Ioannis Koutsis
