= David Meineke =

South African rower

Personal information
- Nationality: South African
- Born: 18 October 1929; Dannhauser, South Africa
- Died: 1 February 2010 (aged 80); Pietermaritzburg, South Africa

Sport
- Sport: Rowing

David Meineke (18 October 1929 – 1 February 2010) was a South African rower. He competed in the men's single sculls event at the 1960 Summer Olympics.
