= Ugo Pifferi =

Italian rower

Personal information
- Nationality: Italian
- Born: 15 April 1930; Milan, Italy
- Died: 1 September 1998 (aged 68)

Sport
- Sport: Rowing

Ugo Pifferi (15 April 1930 – 1 September 1998) was an Italian rower. He competed in the men's single sculls event at the 1952 Summer Olympics.
