= Hussein El-Alfy =

Egyptian rower

Personal information
- Nationality: Egyptian
- Born: 29 March 1927
- Died: 29 January 2011 (aged 83); Cairo, Egypt

Sport
- Sport: Rowing

Hussein Yussuf El-Alfy (29 March 1927 – 29 January 2011) was an Egyptian rower. He competed in the men's single sculls event at the 1952 Summer Olympics.
