= Stefano Martinoli =

Italian rower

Personal information
- Nationality: Italian
- Born: 21 September 1935 (age 89); Cittiglio, Italy

Sport
- Sport: Rowing

Stefano Martinoli (born 21 September 1935) is an Italian rower. He competed in the men's single sculls event at the 1956 Summer Olympics.
