= František Reich =

Slovak rower (1929–2021)

Personal information
- Born: 31 October 1929 Žilina, Czechoslovakia
- Died: 27 May 2021 (aged 91) Bratislava, Slovakia

Sport
- Sport: Rowing
Medal record
Men's rowing
Representing Czechoslovakia
European Rowing Championships
Silver medal – second place	1955 Ghent	Double sculls
Bronze medal – third place	1956 Bled	Double sculls

František Reich (31 October 1929 – 27 May 2021) was a Slovak rower who competed for Czechoslovakia. He competed at the 1952 Summer Olympics in Helsinki in men's single sculls where he was eliminated in the semi-finals repêchage. He competed at the 1956 Summer Olympics in Melbourne in men's double sculls where he was eliminated in the semi-finals repêchage. He died on 27 May 2021 in Bratislava.
