= Bill Rand =

British rower

Personal information
- Nationality: British
- Born: 29 December 1935
- Died: 26 August 2023 (aged 87)

Sport
- Sport: Rowing

William Henry Rand (29 December 1935 – 26 August 2023) was a British rower. He competed in the men's double sculls event at the 1956 Summer Olympics.

In 1956 Rand won the Double Sculls Challenge Cup with his brother Sidney Rand at the Henley Royal Regatta.
