= Jorge Roesler =

Mexican rower (1924–1975)

Personal information
- Full name: Jorge Enrique Pablo Miguel Roesler Froemberg
- Born: 22 August 1924; Mexico City, Mexico
- Died: 18 January 1975 (aged 50); Mexico City, Mexico

Sport
- Sport: Rowing

Jorge Roesler (22 August 1924 – 18 January 1975) was a Mexican rower. He competed in the men's single sculls event at the 1956 Summer Olympics.
