= Horst Fink =

Austrian rower

Personal information
- Nationality: Austrian
- Born: 1 October 1938 (age 86); Linz, Nazi Germany

Sport
- Sport: Rowing

Horst Fink (born 1 October 1938) is an Austrian rower. He competed in the men's single sculls event at the 1960 Summer Olympics.
