= Ferdinand Rabeder =

Austrian rower (1931–2005)

Personal information
- Born: 31 May 1931
- Died: 19 November 2005 (aged 74)

Sport
- Sport: Rowing

Ferdinand Rabeder (31 May 1931 – 19 November 2005) was an Austrian rower. He competed at the 1956 Summer Olympics in Melbourne with the men's single sculls where he was eliminated in the round one repechage.
