= Albert Krajmer =

Slovak rower

Personal information
- Born: 23 April 1933 Dolný Ohaj, Czechoslovakia
- Died: 10 February 2014 (aged 80) Bratislava, Slovakia

Sport
- Country: Czechoslovakia
- Sport: Rowing
Medal record
Men's rowing
Representing Czechoslovakia
European Rowing Championships
Silver medal – second place	1955 Ghent	Double sculls
Bronze medal – third place	1956 Bled	Double sculls

Albert Krajmer (23 April 1933 – 10 February 2014) was a Slovak rower who competed for Czechoslovakia. He competed at the 1956 Summer Olympics in Melbourne with the men's double sculls where they were eliminated in the round one repêchage.
