= Paul Meyer (rower) =

Swiss rower

Personal information
- Born: 23 July 1922 Berlin, Germany

Sport
- Sport: Rowing
Medal record
Men's rowing
Representing Switzerland
European Rowing Championships
Bronze medal – third place	1951 Mâcon	Single sculls

Paul Meyer (born 23 July 1922) is a Swiss rower. He competed at the 1952 Summer Olympics in Helsinki with the men's single sculls where he was eliminated in the semi-final repêchage.
