= Sevi Holmsten =

Finnish rower

Personal information
- Nationality: Finnish
- Born: 23 August 1921; Pyhtää, Finland
- Died: 1 July 1993 (aged 71); Kotka, Finland

Sport
- Sport: Rowing

Sevi Holmsten (23 August 1921 – 1 July 1993) was a Finnish rower. He competed in the men's single sculls event at the 1952 Summer Olympics.
