= Günther Schütt =

German rower

Personal information
- Nationality: German
- Born: 31 March 1918; Berlin, Germany
- Died: 19 March 1996 (aged 77); Saarland, Germany

Sport
- Sport: Rowing

Günther Schütt (31 March 1918 – 19 March 1996) was a German rower. He competed in the men's single sculls event at the 1952 Summer Olympics, representing Saar.
