= Julio López (rower) =

Spanish rower

Personal information
- Nationality: Spanish
- Born: 13 January 1933 (age 93) Barcelona, Spain

Sport
- Sport: Rowing

Julio López (born 13 January 1933) is a Spanish rower. He competed in the men's single sculls event at the 1960 Summer Olympics.
