= Henri Butel =

French rower

Personal information
- Nationality: French
- Born: 1 July 1929
- Died: 13 August 2013 (aged 84)

Sport
- Sport: Rowing

Henri Butel (1 July 1929 – 18 August 2013) was a French rower. He competed in the men's single sculls event at the 1952 Summer Olympics.
