= Robert Desino =

American rower

Robert "Rob" Desino is a former champion collegiate rower who rowed with the Penn Athletic Club Rowing Association. In the 1996 National Collegiate Rowing Championship, Desino and his brother Chris won first place in the men's double scull race, and were part of the first-place 4+ team, thus helping the Penn team to their best showing at the Nationals since 1985.

Desino competed at the 1997 World Rowing Championships.

The Desino brothers were later named to the USRowing Team and spent the next four years living in Philadelphia training for the Olympics. During that time Robert suffered a career-ending injury.
