= Lex Redelé =

Dutch rower

Personal information
- Nationality: Dutch
- Born: 28 January 1939; Dordrecht, Netherlands
- Died: 18 April 2013 (aged 74); Wassenaar, Netherlands

Sport
- Sport: Rowing

Lex Redelé (28 January 1939 – 18 April 2013) was a Dutch rower. He competed in the men's single sculls event at the 1960 Summer Olympics.
