= Ian Stephen (rower) =

South African rower

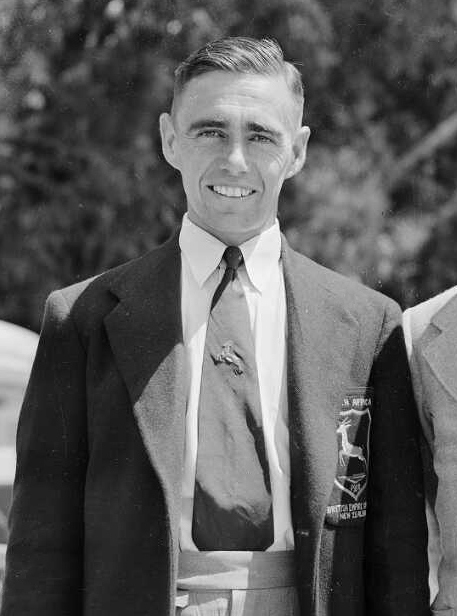
- Stephen at the 1950 British Empire Games

Personal information
- Born: 19 November 1916
- Died: 13 September 2000 (aged 83) Howick, KwaZulu-Natal, South Africa

Sport
- Sport: Rowing
Medal record
Representing South Africa
British Empire Games
Bronze medal – third place	1950 Auckland	Single sculls

Ian Robert George Stephen (19 November 1916 – 13 September 2000) was a South African rower who mostly competed in single sculls. He won a bronze medal at the 1950 British Empire Games and competed at the 1948 and 1952 Summer Olympics, finishing fifth in 1952.
