= Carlos Adueza =

Chilean rower (1932–1977)

Carlos Andueza
Personal information
- Full name: Carlos Andueza Troll
- Nationality: Chile
- Born: 12 February 1932
- Died: 16 April 1977 (aged 45)

Sport
- Sport: Rowing

Carlos Andueza (12 February 1932 – 16 April 1977) was a Chilean rower. He competed in the 1952 Summer Olympics.
