= Rob van Mesdag =

Dutch rower (1930–2018)

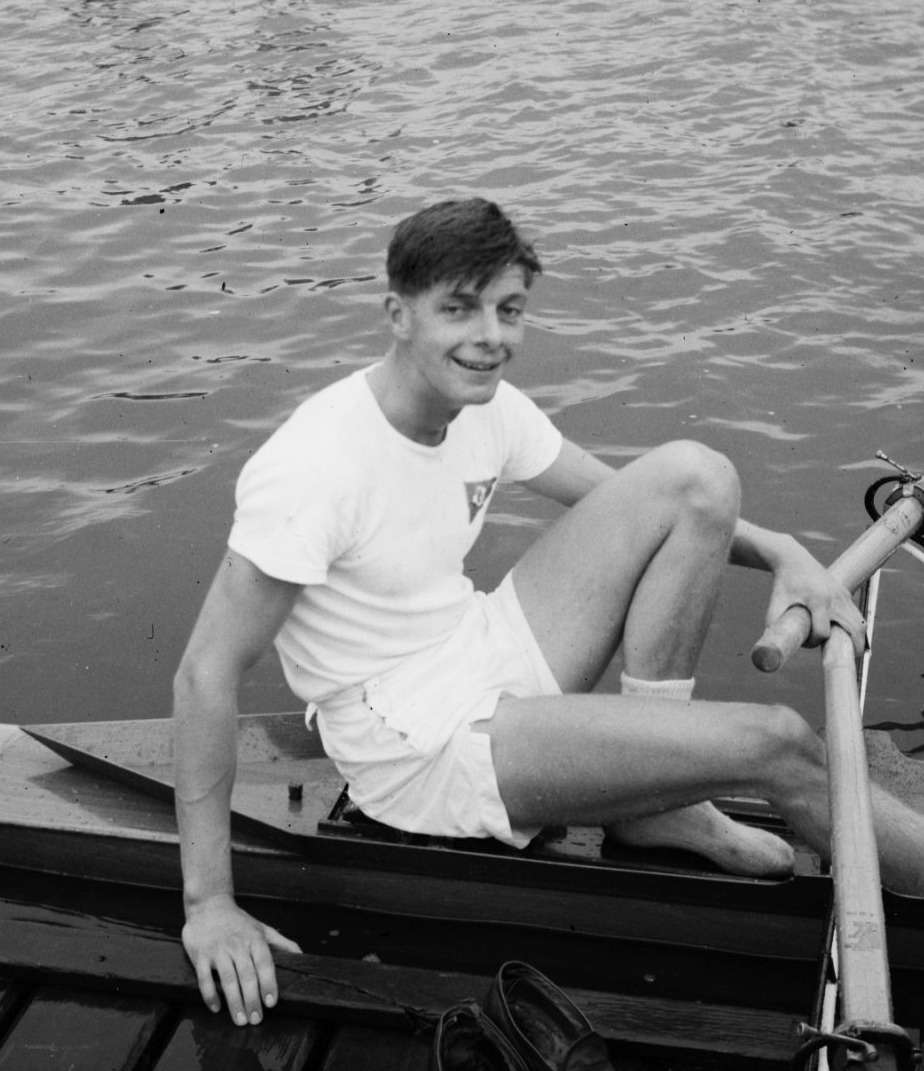
- Rob van Mesdag in 1952

Personal information
- Born: 18 January 1930 Hilversum, the Netherlands
- Died: 18 July 2018 (aged 88)

Sport
- Sport: Rowing
- Club: Tromp, Hilversum
Medal record
Representing the Netherlands
European Rowing Championships
Bronze medal – third place	1955 Ghent	Single sculls

Robbert Hendrik van Mesdag (18 January 1930 – 18 July 2018) was a Dutch rower who won a bronze medal in the single sculls at the 1955 European Rowing Championships. He competed in this event at the 1952 Summer Olympics, but failed to reach the final.
