= Kurt Hipper =

West German rower (1932–2009)

Personal information
- Born: 8 November 1932 Zürich, Switzerland
- Died: 10 February 2009 (aged 76) Johannesburg, South Africa

Sport
- Sport: Rowing
Medal record
Men's rowing
Representing West Germany
European Rowing Championships
Silver medal – second place	1956 Bled	Double sculls

Kurt Hipper (8 November 1932 – 10 February 2009) was a West German rower who represented the United Team of Germany. He competed at the 1956 Summer Olympics in Melbourne with the men's double sculls where they came fourth. He later emigrated to South Africa and was the country's representative of the International Rowing Federation (FISA).
