= Savino Rebek =

Italian rower (1940–2026)

Personal information
- Nationality: Italian
- Born: 13 November 1940 Trieste, Italy
- Died: 29 April 2026 (aged 85)

Sport
- Sport: Rowing

Savino Rebek (13 November 1940 – 29 April 2026) was an Italian rower. He competed in the men's single sculls event at the 1960 Summer Olympics. Rebek died on 29 April 2026, at the age of 85.
