= Teodor Kocerka =

Polish rower (1927–1999)

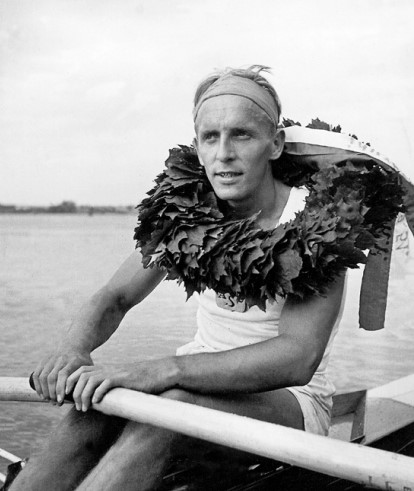
- Teodor Kocerka

Personal information
- Born: 6 August 1927 Bydgoszcz, Second Polish Republic
- Died: 25 September 1999 (aged 72) Warsaw, Poland

Sport
- Sport: Rowing
Medal record
Men's rowing
Representing Poland
Olympic Games
Bronze medal – third place	1952 Helsinki	Single sculls
Bronze medal – third place	1960 Rome	Single sculls
European Championships
Silver medal – second place	1953 Copenhagen	Single sculls
Silver medal – second place	1954 Amsterdam	Single sculls
Gold medal – first place	1955 Ghent	Single sculls
Bronze medal – third place	1956 Bled	Single sculls
Bronze medal – third place	1959 Mâcon	Single sculls

Teodor Kocerka (6 August 1927 – 25 September 1999) was a Polish rower who competed in the 1952 Summer Olympics, those of 1956, and those of 1960.

He was born in Bydgoszcz in the mid-north of Poland and died in Warsaw.

== Olympic events competed ==
In 1952 he won the bronze medal in single sculling.

Four years later he finished fourth in the same event.

At the 1960 Games he won his second bronze in the single sculls.

In the same years as the two bronzes he was pre-selected flagbearer for the Polish Olympic squad.

== Major competition wins ==
He took gold at single sculling at the 1955 European championships.

That same year he won the Diamond Challenge Sculls ('Diamonds') at Henley Royal Regatta, by a length and a half over Sid Rand. He won the next year's event by four lengths, over TA Fox of London RC. His last such final was in 1960, losing by half a length to Stuart Mackenzie of Henley's highly selective Leander Club, not breaking the latter rower's six-year success. By that time Kocerka had changed chosen club from AZS Bydgoszcz to AZS Szczecin.

Olympic Games
Preceded by Mieczysław Łomowski	Flagbearer for Poland; 1952 Helsinki	Succeeded by Tadeusz Rut
Preceded by Tadeusz Rut	Flagbearer for Poland; 1960 Rome	Succeeded by Waldemar Baszanowski
