= Juan Omedes =

Spanish rower

Personal information
- Nationality: Spanish
- Born: 20 November 1927; Barcelona, Spain
- Died: 20 February 1967 (aged 39)

Sport
- Sport: Rowing

Juan Omedes (20 November 1927 – 20 February 1967) was a Spanish rower. He competed at the 1948 Summer Olympics and the 1952 Summer Olympics.
