= Nikos Hatzigiakoumis =

Greek rower (1930–2023)

Personal information
- Nationality: Greek
- Born: 1930; Rhodes, Greece
- Died: 2 January 2023 (aged 93); Frankston

Sport
- Sport: Rowing

Nikos Hatzigiakoumis (Greek: Νίκος Χατζηγιακουμής; 1930 – 2 January 2023) was a Greek rower. He competed in the men's single sculls event at the 1956 Summer Olympics.
