= Sidney Rand (rower) =

British rower

Personal information
- Born: 17 August 1934 Tottenham, England
- Died: 25 December 2008 (aged 74) Royal Berkshire Hospital, Reading, Berkshire, England

Sport
- Sport: Rowing
- Club: RAF RC
Medal record
Men's rowing
Representing England
British Empire Games
Silver medal – second place	1954 Vancouver	Single sculls
Representing Great Britain
European Rowing Championships
Silver medal – second place	1954 Bosbaan	Coxless four

Sidney Charles Rand (17 August 1934 – 25 December 2008) was an English rower who competed for Great Britain at the 1956 Summer Olympics and at the 1960 Summer Olympics. He won the Wingfield Sculls in 1954 and the Double Sculls Challenge Cup at Henley Royal Regatta in 1956.

== Life and sport ==
Rand was born in Tottenham, the eldest of three children. He and his brother Willy were evacuated during the Second World War to 44 Irthlingborough Road, Finedon, Northants. After the war the family returned to Tottenham and Rand attended Down Lane School. He started rowing on the River Lea in east London at the age of 14 where he sculled a Thames skiff until he was good enough for a fine boat. He raced at various regattas such as the Norfolk Sculls in 1952 until, he joined the Royal Air Force on National Service that year. He was posted to RAF Benson, where as a corporal, he rowed for the RAF, the force's rowing facilities being based with Wallingford Rowing Club across the River Thames.

In 1954 Rand won the Wingfield Sculls beating Tony Fox and John Marsden and competed in the event nine times in his career. He also won the first Scullers Head and was selected for the 1954 British Empire and Commonwealth Games in Vancouver, where he took silver. After completing his three years of National Service, Rand moved to Henley on Thames, where he joined Leander Club, working full-time for a Henley building firm. In 1955 he lost the final of the Diamond Challenge Sculls at Henley Royal Regatta, by a length and a half to Teodor Kocerka, but in 1956 won the Double Sculls Challenge Cup with his brother Bill Rand. They were selected for the 1956 Summer Olympics in Melbourne where they were the fastest losers in the repechage. In 1960 Sid Rand competed in the single sculls at the 1960 Summer Olympics in Rome.

In 1961 Rand met Olympic long-jumper Mary Bignal and she accepted his marriage proposal shortly after they met. He supported her at the 1964 Summer Olympics where she won gold, silver and bronze. The marriage ended after five years.

After his international career, Rand turned to coaching at Upper Thames Rowing Club and Leander Club and spent time with the British squad at the end of the 20th century. In 1999 he coached Steve Williams and Simon Dennis to a win at the Silver Goblets at Henley. He continued to row and scull himself, competing regularly. He also resumed skiffing being a successful competitor at the Wargrave and Shiplake Regatta.

Rand died of cancer at the Royal Berkshire Hospital aged 74.
