= Penn Athletic Club Rowing Association =

Amateur rowing club

Coordinates: 39.96968°N 75.18856°W

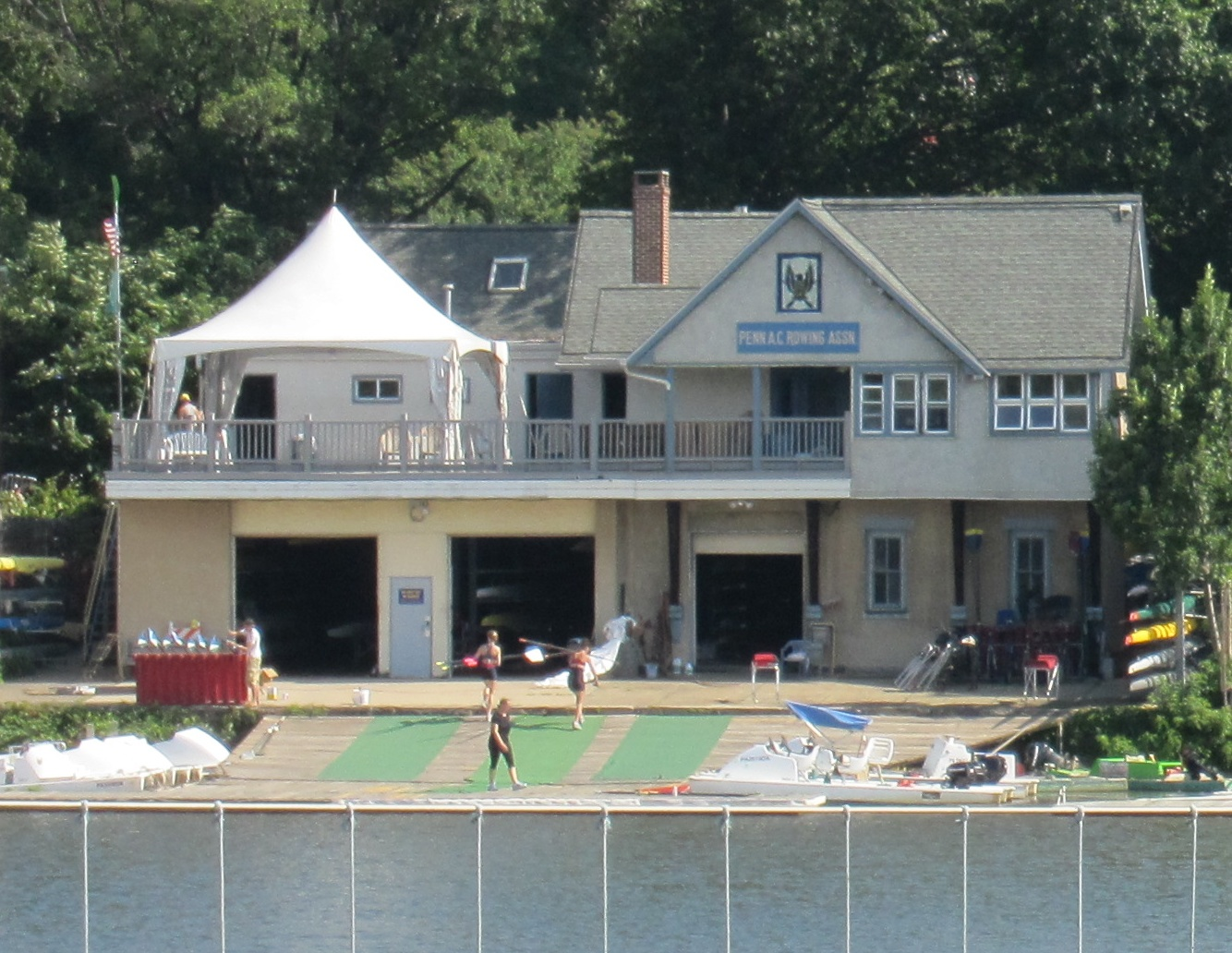
- Location: #12 Boathouse Row, Philadelphia, Pennsylvania, U.S.
- Home water: Schuylkill River
- Established: 1871
- Navy admission: 1878
- Former names: West Philadelphia Boat Club
- Key people: Mike Wherley (President); Erika Jorgensen (Vice-President); M Sean Hall (Coach); Justin Keen (Captain)
- Colors: Navy and Yellow
- Affiliations: The Shipley School and Monsignor Bonner High School
- Website: pennac.org
- Penn Athletic Club Rowing Association
- U.S. Historic district – Contributing property
- Philadelphia Register of Historic Places
- Location within Pennsylvania Location within the United States
- Location: Philadelphia, Pennsylvania
- Part of: Boathouse Row (ID87000821)
- Added to NRHP: February 27, 1987

Penn Athletic Club Rowing Association (commonly known as Penn AC) is an amateur rowing club located at #12 Boathouse Row in the historic Boathouse Row of Philadelphia, Pennsylvania. Penn AC was founded in 1871 as the West Philadelphia Boat Club. Penn AC has been a destination for elite rowers looking to make the US National Team, ever since John B. Kelly Sr. joined Penn AC after a schism with his former club, Vesper.

== Prominent members ==
- Ted Nash, 2008 US Olympic Team Coaching Staff
- Matt Schnobrich, 2008 US Olympic Team (Bow in Men's Eight) and 2007 US National Team member (Men's Four)
- Micah Boyd, 2008 US Olympic Team member (4 Seat in Men's Eight)
- Renee Hykel, 2008 US Olympic Team member (Bow in Lightweight Women's Double Sculls)
- Dan Beery, 2007 US National Team member (Men's Four with Cox)
- Ivan Baldychev, 2007 US National Team member (Men's Lightweight Single Sculls)
- Steve Kasprzyk, 2007 US National Team member (Men's Pair with Cox)
- Ted Farwell, 2006, 2008 US National Team member (Men's Pair with Cox)
- Pat Godfrey, 2007 US National Team member (Men's Pair with Cox)
- Dave Florio, 2007 US National Team member (Men's Pair with Cox)
- John Riley, 2007 US National Team Coaching Staff
- Luke Agnini, 2007 US National Team Coaching Staff
- Andrew Medcalf, 2007 US National Team Coaching Staff
- Christopher DeFelice 2004 US National Team member (Men's Pair with Cox)
- Jeff McLaughlin, 1992 & 1988 US Olympic Teams member
- George G. Loveless, 1936 US Olympic Team
- Dan Barrow, 1936 US Olympic Team
- Charles J. McIlvaine, 1928 US Olympic Team
- Paul Costello, 1920, 1924 & 1928 US Olympic Teams member

== Photo gallery ==
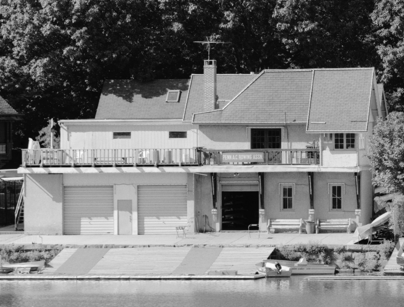
Penn AC Rowing Assoc., 12 Boathouse Row, 1972.

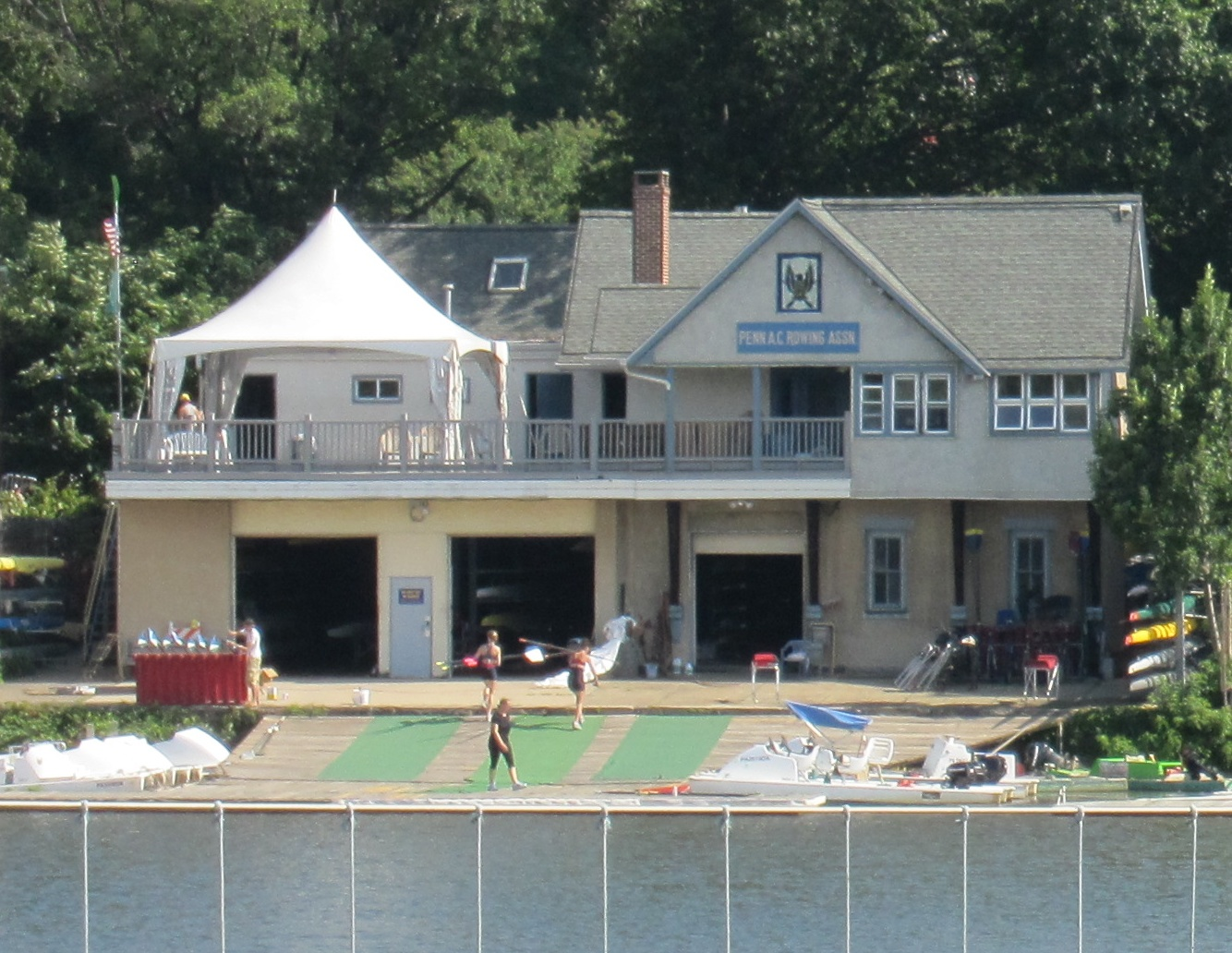
Penn AC in 2010.

== See also ==
- Robert Desino
- Edward Marsh
