= Klaus von Fersen =

West German rower (born 1931)

Personal information
- Born: 29 March 1931 (age 95)

Sport
- Sport: Rowing
Medal record
Men's rowing
Representing West Germany
European Championships
Silver medal – second place	1956 Bled	Single sculls
Silver medal – second place	1957 Duisburg	Single sculls
Silver medal – second place	1958 Poznań	Single sculls
Silver medal – second place	1959 Mâcon	Single sculls

Klaus von Fersen (born 29 March 1931) is a West German rower who represented the United Team of Germany. He competed at the 1956 Summer Olympics in Melbourne with the men's single sculls where he was eliminated in the semi-final.
