= Tony Fox (rower) =

British rower

Personal information
- Born: Thomas Anthony Fox; 27 July 1928 Guernsey
- Died: 31 July 2010 (aged 82)
- Occupation: medical doctor

Sport
- Sport: Rowing
- Club: Pembroke College, Cm; London Rowing Club
Medal record
Men's rowing
Representing Great Britain
European Rowing Championships
Silver medal – second place	1951 Mâcon	Single scull

Thomas Anthony Fox (27 July 1928 – 31 July 2010) was a doctor and rower who competed for Great Britain at the 1952 Summer Olympics and at the 1956 Summer Olympics. He won the Diamond Challenge Sculls and the Wingfield Sculls.

== Biography ==
Fox was born on Guernsey, the son of an Irish doctor, William Burton Fox. He was educated at Sherborne School and Pembroke College, Cambridge, where he studied medicine. In 1951 he won the Diamond Challenge Sculls at Henley Royal Regatta. He also won the Wingfield Sculls and the London Cup in the same year to achieve the rowing triple crown. He then joined London Rowing Club and 1952 he came second in the Diamond Challenge Sculls to Mervyn Wood. He competed in the Summer Olympics at Helsinki in the single sculls and came fourth overall. Later in 1952 he won the Wingfield Sculls again. In 1953 he regained the Diamond Challenge Sculls and retained the Wingfield Sculls for the third year. In 1954, Fox and his partner John Marsden astonished the rowing world by beating the Russian silver medallists in the Double Sculls at Henley. Marsden had beaten Fox in the first tideway Scullers Head earlier that year. The pair went on to win the European Championships at Amsterdam.

In 1956 Fox was runner up to Teodor Kocerka in the Diamond Challenge Sculls. He competed in the Summer Olympics at Melbourne but only made it to the second heat.

Fox completed his medical training at St George's Hospital and joined the family general practice on Guernsey with his father, brother and uncle. He retired to Cornwall in 1989. He died four days after his eighty-second birthday.

Fox married Paula Sweby, a nurse at St George's, in 1958 and had four daughters.
