= Fernand Steenacker =

Belgian rower

Personal information
- Nationality: Belgian
- Born: 26 February 1931 Bredene, Belgium
- Died: 26 March 2018 (aged 87)
- Relative: Henri Steenacker (brother)

Sport
- Sport: Rowing
- Club: KRNSO, Oostende

Fernand Steenacker (26 February 1931 – 26 March 2018) was a Belgian rower. Together with his brother Henri Steenacker, he competed in double sculls at the 1956 Summer Olympics, but did not reach the final.
