= Stuart Mackenzie =

Australian rower (1937–2020)

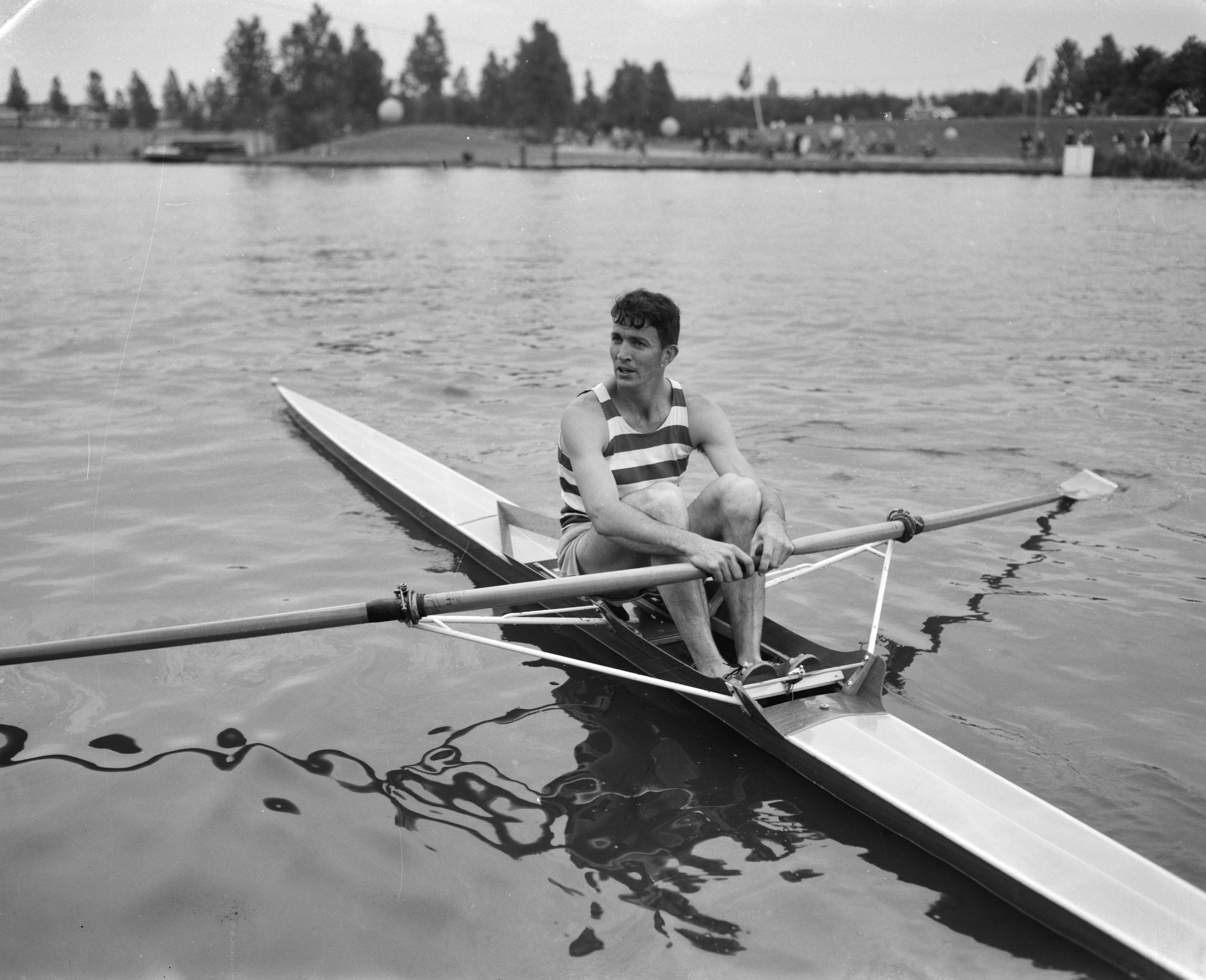

Personal information
- Born: 5 April 1936
- Died: 20 October 2020 (aged 83) Taunton, England

Sport
- Sport: Rowing
Medal record
Men's rowing
Representing Australia
Olympic Games
Silver medal – second place	1956 Melbourne	Single sculls
Commonwealth Games
Gold medal – first place	1958 Cardiff	Single sculls
Silver medal – second place	1958 Cardiff	Double sculls
European Championships
Gold medal – first place	1957 Duisburg	Single sculls
Gold medal – first place	1958 Poznań	Single sculls
Representing Great Britain
World Championships
Silver medal – second place	1962 Lucerne	Single sculls

Stuart Mackenzie (5 April 1936 - 20 October 2020) was an Australian rower. He was an Australian champion and Olympic medalist, who also competed for Great Britain at the 1962 World Championships.

His fierce rivalry with Vyacheslav Ivanov turned in to a lifelong friendship until Mackenzie's passing, as was documented in Ivanov's autobiography. In the last few pages of his book, Ivanov wrote the following about Mackenzie when they reunited again at Henley Royal Regatta in 2010: “I looked at Stuart and suddenly realised that this elderly foreigner whom I have not seen for almost 50 years and whom I might never see again, who used to drive me crazy and whom I almost hated once, is actually very dear to me. In some respects, and in his own way, he might be the closest friend I have.”

== Club and state rowing ==
Mackenzie was educated at The King's School in Sydney where he took up rowing. He matriculated in 1954. His senior club rowing was from the Sydney Rowing Club.

== International representative rowing ==
Mackenzie won a silver medal in single sculls at the 1956 Summer Olympics in Melbourne. He was reputed to have miscounted the distance, due to not realising the spacing of the buoys changed from 100 m to 50 m in the last 250 m of the race, and so stopped temporarily while still 100 metres from the finish.

Mackenzie visited South Africa in 1958, and rowed on the Vaal River at Billabong, near Vereeniging. He took part in the SA Championships and won the double sculls event with his trainee, John Eden.

At the 1958 British Empire and Commonwealth Games he won a gold medal in single sculls and also set a Commonwealth Games record (7:20.1 mins), and he received a silver medal in double sculls with Mervyn Wood.

He won the Diamond Challenge Sculls at Henley Royal Regatta six times, consecutively, from 1957 to 1962, and won the Silver Goblets partnering Christopher Davidge in 1963, and the Double Sculls, also with Davidge, in 1959. He was also noted for his gamesmanship, including going out for practice sessions wearing a bowler hat.

Mackenzie took part in an event of the Henley Royal Regatta where he was way ahead of all other rowers when he stopped rowing and tried to adjust his cap. However, the reason was to give time to his opponents to catch up with him as it happened. Then he started rowing again and he easily managed to get away, be faster and end first.

Although favoured to win the gold medal at the 1960 Olympic Games in Rome, he fell ill before the race and had to withdraw.

After refusing to return to Australia from Europe for trials for the 1962 British Empire and Commonwealth Games to be held in Perth, Mackenzie rowed for Great Britain at the 1st World Rowing Championships in Lucerne, finishing second to his great friend and rival Vyacheslav Ivanov.

Mackenzie was inducted into the Sport Australia Hall of Fame in 1985.
