= Henri Steenacker =

Belgian rower (1926–1993)

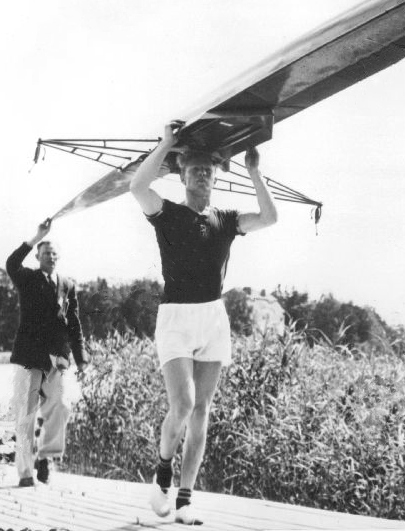
- Steenacker at the 1952 Olympics

Personal information
- Born: 22 April 1926
- Died: 25 August 1993 (aged 67)

Sport
- Sport: Rowing
- Club: KRNSO, Oostende
Medal record
Representing Belgium
European Rowing Championships
Bronze medal – third place	1957 Duisburg	Double sculls

Henri Steenacker (22 April 1926 – 25 August 1993) was a Belgian rower. He competed in the single sculls at the 1952 Summer Olympics and in the double sculls at the 1956 Summer Olympics, together with his brother Fernand, but failed to reach the final on both occasions. Steenacker won a bronze medal in the double sculls at the 1957 European Championships, together with Gérard Higny.

Steenacker died aged 67 in a cycling accident.
