= Rowing at the 1948 Summer Olympics – Men's single sculls =

Olympic rowing event

Men's single sculls at the Games of the XIV Olympiad
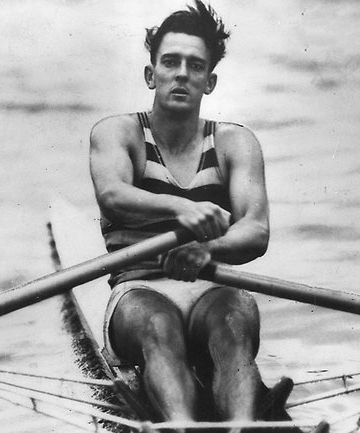
- Gold medalist Mervyn Wood (1952)
- Venue: Henley-on-Thames
- Date: 5–9 August 1948
- Competitors: 14 from 14 nations
- Winning time: 7:24.4

Medalists
1st place, gold medalist(s)		Mervyn Wood; Australia
2nd place, silver medalist(s)		Eduardo Risso; Uruguay
3rd place, bronze medalist(s)		Romolo Catasta; Italy

The men's single sculls competition at the 1948 Summer Olympics took place at Henley-on-Thames, London, United Kingdom. The event was held from 5 to 9 August. There were 14 competitors from 14 nations, with each nation limited to a single boat in the event. The event was won by Mervyn Wood of Australia, the nation's third victory in four Games (Bobby Pearce had won in 1928 and 1932). Eduardo Risso's silver was Uruguay's second medal in the event, after a bronze in 1932. Italy received its first men's single sculls medal with Romolo Catasta's bronze. The United States had its five-Games podium streak in the event ended, as John B. Kelly Jr. lost his semifinal by 0.4 seconds and did not advance to the final.

== Background ==
This was the 10th appearance of the event. Rowing had been on the programme in 1896 but was cancelled due to bad weather. The single sculls has been held every time that rowing has been contested, beginning in 1900.

None of the 20 single scullers from the pre-war 1936 Games returned, though Australia's Mervyn Wood had been on the eight team. The three post-war Diamond Challenge Sculls champions were all competing: Wood (1948) was the reigning winner, with Jean Séphériadès of France (1946) and John B. Kelly Jr. of the United States (1947) the previous title holders. Séphériadès was also the 1947 European champion. Kelly was the son of 1920 Olympic champion John B. Kelly Sr. (who had famously been excluded from the Diamond Challenge Sculls).

Egypt and Greece each made their debut in the event. Great Britain made its ninth appearance, most among nations, having missed only the 1904 Games in St. Louis.

== Competition format ==
The venue, Henley-on-Thames, imposed certain restrictions and modifications to the format. The course could handle only three boats at a time (and this required expansion of the typical Henley course), so the six-boat final introduced in 1936 was not possible this time. The course distance was also modified; instead of either the 2000 metres distance that was standard for the Olympics or the 1 mile 550 yards (2112 metres) standard at Henley, a course that was somewhat shorter than either was used. Sources disagree on the exact distance: 1929 metres is listed by the Official Report, though other sources say 1850 metres.

The format was largely similar to the 1936 Games, though with the three-boats-per-race limit. There were four rounds: quarterfinals, a repechage, semifinals, and a final.

- Quarterfinals: There were 5 heats of 2 or 3 boats each. The winner of each advanced to the semifinals, while all other boats went to the repechage.
- Repechage: The 9 boats were placed in 3 heats of 3 boats each. Again, the winner of each advanced to the semifinals; the remaining 6 boats were eliminated.
- Semifinals: The remaining 8 boats competed in unbalanced semifinals: 2 heats had 3 boats, while the last heat had 2. Only the winners advanced, with the other 5 boats eliminated.
- Final: The final featured the three medalists racing to determine which color each would receive.

== Schedule ==
All times are British Summer Time (UTC+1)

Date	Time	Round
Thursday, 5 August 1948		Quarterfinals
Friday, 6 August 1948		Repechage
Saturday, 7 August 1948	11:45	Semifinals
Monday, 9 August 1948	15:30	Final

== Results ==
=== Quarterfinals ===
The first rower in each heat advanced directly to the semifinals. The others competed again in the repechage for remaining spots in the semifinals.

==== Quarterfinal 1 ====
Rank	Rower	Nation	Time	Notes
1	Mervyn Wood	Australia	7:25.9	Q
2	Eduardo Risso	Uruguay	7:36.3	R
3	Ian Stephen	South Africa	7:38.3	R

==== Quarterfinal 2 ====
Rank	Rower	Nation	Time	Notes
1	Antony Rowe	Great Britain	7:30.5	Q
2	Hans Jakob Keller	Switzerland	7:34.2	R
3	Dragutin Petrovečki	Yugoslavia	8:17.3	R

==== Quarterfinal 3 ====
Rank	Rower	Nation	Time	Notes
1	John B. Kelly Jr.	United States	7:39.7	Q
2	Curt Brunnqvist	Sweden	7:47.2	R
3	Juan Omedes	Spain	7:52.1	R

==== Quarterfinal 4 ====
Rank	Rower	Nation	Time	Notes
1	Jean Séphériadès	France	7:34.3	Q
2	Tranquilo Cappozzo	Argentina	7:38.9	R
3	Mohamed El-Sayed	Egypt	8:01.4	R

==== Quarterfinal 5 ====
No official time was recorded in this heat.

Rank	Rower	Nation	Time	Notes
1	Romolo Catasta	Italy	Unknown	Q
2	Faidon Matthaiou	Greece	Unknown	R

=== Repechage ===
The winner of each race advanced to the semifinals; the other rowers are eliminated.

==== Repechage heat 1 ====
Rank	Rower	Nation	Time	Notes
1	Tranquilo Cappozzo	Argentina	7:45.0	Q
2	Juan Omedes	Spain	7:57.3	
3	Faidon Matthaiou	Greece	8:13.9	

==== Repechage heat 2 ====
Rank	Rower	Nation	Time	Notes
1	Eduardo Risso	Uruguay	7:24.4	Q
2	Hans Jakob Keller	Switzerland	7:25.1	
3	Curt Brunnqvist	Sweden	7:27.0	

==== Repechage heat 3 ====
Rank	Rower	Nation	Time	Notes
1	Ian Stephen	South Africa	7:35.6	Q
2	Mohamed El-Sayed	Egypt	7:44.8	
3	Dragutin Petrovečki	Yugoslavia	8:17.3	

=== Semifinals ===
The winner of each race advanced to the final.

==== Semifinal 1 ====
Rank	Rower	Nation	Time	Notes
1	Romolo Catasta	Italy	8:05.4	Q
2	Tranquilo Cappozzo	Argentina	8:12.6	
3	Ian Stephen	South Africa	DNS	

==== Semifinal 2 ====
Rank	Rower	Nation	Time	Notes
1	Eduardo Risso	Uruguay	8:09.3	Q
2	John B. Kelly Jr.	United States	8:09.7	
3	Antony Rowe	Great Britain	8:22.8	

==== Semifinal 3 ====
Rank	Rower	Nation	Time	Notes
1	Mervyn Wood	Australia	8:08.5	Q
2	Jean Séphériadès	France	8:17.1	

=== Final ===
Rank	Rower	Nation	Time
1st place, gold medalist(s)	Mervyn Wood	Australia	7:24.4
2nd place, silver medalist(s)	Eduardo Risso	Uruguay	7:38.2
3rd place, bronze medalist(s)	Romolo Catasta	Italy	7:51.4

== Results summary ==
Rank	Rower	Nation	Quarterfinals	Repechage	Semifinals	Final
1st place, gold medalist(s)	Mervyn Wood	Australia	7:25.9	Bye	8:08.5	7:24.4
2nd place, silver medalist(s)	Eduardo Risso	Uruguay	7:36.3	7:24.4	8:09.3	7:38.2
3rd place, bronze medalist(s)	Romolo Catasta	Italy	Unknown	Bye	8:05.4	7:51.4
4	John B. Kelly Jr.	United States	7:39.7	Bye	8:09.7	Did not advance
5	Tranquilo Cappozzo	Argentina	7:38.9	7:45.0	8:12.6	Did not advance
6	Jean Séphériadès	France	7:34.3	Bye	8:17.1	Did not advance
7	Antony Rowe	Great Britain	7:30.5	Bye	8:22.8	Did not advance
8	Ian Stephen	South Africa	7:38.3	7:35.6	DNS	Did not advance
9	Hans Jakob Keller	Switzerland	7:34.2	7:25.1	Did not advance	
10	Curt Brunnqvist	Sweden	7:47.2	7:27.0	Did not advance	
11	Mohamed El-Sayed	Egypt	8:01.4	7:44.8	Did not advance	
12	Juan Omedes	Spain	7:52.1	7:57.3	Did not advance	
13	Faidon Matthaiou	Greece	Unknown	8:13.9	Did not advance	
14	Dragutin Petrovečki	Yugoslavia	8:17.3	8:17.3	Did not advance	
