= Antony Rowe =

British rower

- Born: Antony Duncan Rowe; 4 August 1924; Cookham Dean, Berkshire, England
- Died: 5 December 2003 (aged 79); Upper Swainswick, Somerset, England
- Education: Eton
- Occupations: Rower and printer
- Spouses: Jennifer Renwick; Miranda Noel-Buxton (née Chisenhale-Marsh); Charlotte Savage
- Parent(s): George Duncan Rowe; Molly Allen
- Relatives: Sir Robert Renwick (father-in-law)

Antony Rowe
Medal record

Men's rowing

Representing England

British Empire Games
Silver medal – second place	1950 Auckland	Single Sculls

Antony Duncan Rowe (4 August 1924 – 5 December 2003), or Tony Rowe, was an English rower who competed for Great Britain at the 1948 Summer Olympics and won the Diamond Challenge Sculls at Henley Royal Regatta in 1950. He was later a printer during a period of great change and developed "a successful model for short-run printing".

== Early life ==
Rowe was born at Cookham Dean, Berkshire the sixth of seven children of George Duncan Rowe and his wife Molly Allen. His father had founded the stockbroking firm Rowe & Pitman in 1895 and his mother was a violinist. He was educated at Eton College where he was captain of Boats and president of Pop. He left Eton during the Second World War and joined the Royal Navy Submarine Service straight from school. In 1944 he was posted to the Far East, where he took part in the Japanese surrender of Hong Kong (30 August 1945).

== Rowing career ==
After the war Rowe went to Trinity College, Oxford on a scholarship and read PPE. He started rowing again, became captain of Trinity College Boat Club, and was a member of the Oxford crew in the 1948 Boat Race. He excelled in the single scull and participated in the 1948 Summer Olympics. There he reached the Men's Single Sculls semi-finals, in the same heat as the American Jack Kelly (who lost a close race as Rowe finished third; neither advanced to the final). Jack Kelly senior invited Rowe to Philadelphia for another race. Rowe lost to Kelly Jr. and sold his rigger in order to take Jack's sister Grace out to dinner. In 1949 Rowe was president of the Oxford club and a member of its Boat Race crew that was narrowly beaten by Cambridge. He was also runner-up in the Wingfield Sculls to Farn Carpmael. In 1950 he won the Diamond Challenge Sculls at Henley. He also took part in the 1950 British Empire Games and won the silver medal behind the Australian Merv Wood—who had won both the Olympic gold and the Diamond Sculls in 1948. Rowe coached the Oxford boat from 1954 to 1956 and in 1963.

== Printing career ==
Rowe started work with the Pitman Press in Bath. In 1954 the firm bought Western Printing Services, which had provided typesetting for the trade, and Rowe became its manager. Western became famous, and Rowe may have risked prosecution under British obscenity law, when he printed for Penguin Books the first unexpurgated edition of Lady Chatterley's Lover, which other printers had avoided. In the event, with 200,000 copies in storage during October/November 1960, Penguin alone was prosecuted and acquitted. Rowe designed and printed The Western Type Book (1960), with specimen pages of all the many different types held by Western in different sizes which became a bible for publishers' production managers. Rowe returned to the Pitman Press in 1972. He had identified a market for short-run printing and set out to make profitable runs of 100 or fewer when the threshold was generally considered to be 1,000 copies. After his retirement from Pitman Press in 1983, he established Antony Rowe Ltd in Chippenham, Wiltshire, using new techniques and equipment to cut costs; it became a successful business thanks to his ability to "think small". His second encounter with censorship occurred when he inadvertently became subject of a Fatwa after printing 100 sample copies of 'Satanic Verses'. One evening his dinner with Charlotte was disturbed by a dozen SAS officers crawling up his lawn late at night when the security alarm was set off in error. Antony Rowe Ltd has since become part of the CPI SAS printing group and is now a leading provider of print on demand services to both traditional publishers and new self-publishing services that act as an intermediary between the author and the printer, such as CompletelyNovel.

He also published books of his own: 'For Lucasta with Rue', 'Poems by Torquatus' and 'Torquatus – A Half Life'. These were collections of poems, mainly by Horace (in the original Latin) and Houseman, Lovelace and a curious friend, Torquatus, who a note by S. A. Gitta (a pun on the Latin for Arrow) said died in 1969, the year of his divorce from Jenny. In 1986 he published Neurosis Induced Cannibalism in Antarctic Pigs, illustrated by his son Giles, under the pseudonym of P. Trotter.

== Personal life ==
In 1954, Rowe married Jennifer Renwick, the daughter of the first Independent TV magnate Sir Robert Renwick. In 1964 Sir Robert was awarded the last hereditary peerage. The marriage was dissolved in 1969, and Antony married Miranda Noel-Buxton (née Chisenhale-Marsh) in 1970. His third marriage was to Charlotte Savage in 1985.

Antony Rowe had three brothers, Ronnie, Michael and David, and three sisters, Heather, Grace and Glory, who entertained each other as children playing music together. Antony was an accomplished pianist who was never short of female vocal accompanists. He appreciated beauty and was Chair of the Bath Arts Festival for several years. He has two children, by his first wife Jenny: Giles (b 1956) and Antonia (b 1959). His family's favourite dog was his German Short Haired Pointer, Apollo, who accompanied him to the Bath Press every day.

Rowe never lived far from Bath. He died in Upper Swainswick, Somerset, at the age of 79.

== See also ==
- List of Oxford University Boat Race crews
