= Andrew Lycett =

English biographer and journalist

Andrew Michael Duncan Lycett (born 1948) FRSL is an English biographer and journalist.

== Early life ==
Born in Stamford, Lincolnshire, to Peter Norman Lycett Lycett and Joan Mary Duncan (née Day), Lycett spent some of his childhood in Tanganyika, where his father established a preparatory school, The Southern Highlands School. Peter Lycett's mother was of the Burns-Lindow family of Ingwell and Ehen Hall, Cumbria.

Lycett was educated at Charterhouse School and studied history at Christ Church, Oxford.

== Career ==
Lycett worked for a while for The Times as a correspondent in Africa, the Middle East, and Asia. He has written several well-received biographies of literary figures, and is perhaps best known for his biography of Ian Fleming, first published in 1995. He has written more widely on the lives and work of Rudyard Kipling and Arthur Conan Doyle.

He was elected a Fellow of the Royal Society of Literature in 2010.

He lives and writes in London.

== Bibliography ==
=== Books ===
- Blundy, David & Andrew Lycett (1987). Qaddhafi and the Libyan Revolution. London: Weidenfeld and Nicolson. ISBN 978-0-29778-924-6.
  - Blundy, David & Andrew Lycett (1987). Qaddafi and the Libyan Revolution. New York: Little, Brown. ISBN 978-0-31610-042-7.
  - — & — (1988). Qaddafi and the Libyan Revolution (New revised ed.). Corgi. ISBN 978-0-55299-307-4.
- Ian Fleming (Weidenfeld & Nicolson, 1995) ISBN 9780297812999; US title, Ian Fleming: The Man Behind James Bond (Turner Publishing, 1995) ISBN 978-1-57036-343-6
- From Diamond Sculls to Golden Handcuffs: A History of Rowe & Pitman (Robert Hale, 1998) ISBN 978-0-70906-301-8 – a history of the stockbroking firm established by George Duncan Rowe and Frederick I. Pitman
- Rudyard Kipling (Weidenfeld & Nicolson, 1999) ISBN 978-0-29781-907-3
- Dylan Thomas: A New Life (Weidenfeld & Nicolson, 2003) ISBN 978-0-29760-793-9
- Conan Doyle: The Man Who Created Sherlock Holmes (Weidenfeld & Nicolson, 2007) ISBN 978-0-29784-852-3; US title, The Man Who Created Sherlock Holmes: The Life and Times of Sir Arthur Conan Doyle (Free Press, 2007) ISBN 978-0-74327-523-1
- Wilkie Collins: A Life of Sensation (Hutchinson & Co., 2013) ISBN 978-0-09193-709-6
- Conan Doyle's Wide World: Sherlock Holmes and Beyond (Tauris Parke, 2020) ISBN 978-1-78831-206-6
- The Worlds of Sherlock Holmes: The Inspiration Behind the World's Greatest Detective (Frances Lincoln, 2023) ISBN 978-0-71128-167-7

=== as Editor ===
- Rudyard Kipling: Selected Poems (The Folio Society, 2004)
- Kipling Abroad: Traffics and Discoveries from Burma to Brazil (I. B. Tauris, 2010) ISBN 978-1-84885-072-9
- Kipling and the Sea: Voyages and Discoveries from North Atlantic to South Pacific (I. B. Tauris, 2014) ISBN 978-1-78076-273-9
- Kipling and War: From Tommy to My Boy Jack (I. B. Tauris, 2015) ISBN 978-1-78453-333-5

=== Book reviews ===
Year	Review article	Work(s) reviewed			
2013	Lycett, Andrew (8 February 2013). "Bonds Books". Reviews. The Times Literary Supplement.	Glibert, Jon (2012). Ian Fleming : The Bibliography. London: Queen Anne Press.	2017	Lycett, Andrew (September 2017). "Stripping down the buttoned up". Reviews. History Today. 67 (9): 96.	Hughes, Kathryn. Victorians undone : tales of the flesh in the age of decorum. Fourth Estate.
