= Rachel Harlow =

American socialite (born 1948)

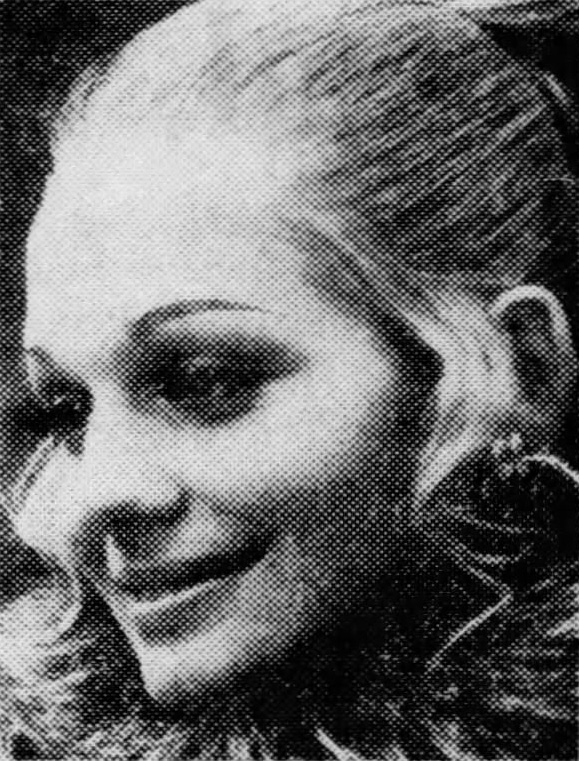
- Harlow in 1973
- Born: May 2, 1948 (age 78)
- Other names: Rachel Finocchio; Rachel Billebault; Harlow
- Occupations: Pageant queen; actress; nightclub hostess; model; restaurateur
- Spouse: Gerard Billebault (1981–1990s)
- Partner: Jack Kelly Jr. (1972-1975)

Rachel Billebault (née Finocchio; born May 2, 1948), known professionally as Harlow, is an American pageant queen, model, businesswoman, and socialite. She is best known for her appearance in the documentary The Queen (1968) following the 1967 Miss All-America Camp Beauty Contest, which she competed in and eventually won.

After her appearance in the documentary, Harlow became a local celebrity in Philadelphia, undergoing gender transition and opening her own nightclub called Harlow's. She is also notable for her romance with Olympic rower and Philadelphia City Council member Jack Kelly Jr., a scandal which eventually forced him to withdraw his candidacy from the 1975 Philadelphia mayoral election.

== Early life ==
Rachel Harlow was born in 1948 to Joe and Rose Finocchio and grew up in South Philadelphia, Pennsylvania, graduating from South Philadelphia High School in 1965. A transgender woman, Harlow had displayed feminine qualities from as early as five years old, and blood tests taken at age 15 indicated she had naturally very low levels of male hormones. Harlow came out to her parents as a trans woman at age 16 after reading an article about the transgender actress Christine Jorgensen. She stated that she had an unhappy childhood due to her gender variance but had great support from her friends and family.

== Career ==
Harlow entered and won her first drag competition in 1966, taking her stage name from the 1930s actress Jean Harlow. The following year, she won the Miss All-America Camp Beauty Contest in New York City over Crystal LaBeija, who would go on to found the House of LaBeija after her loss. Harlow attended the 1968 Cannes Film Festival to help promote Frank Simon's The Queen documentary about the contest, following which she had a small acting role in Henry Jaglom’s 1971 film A Safe Place (1971).

Harlow returned to Philadelphia and met the restaurateur Stanley "Bo" Rosenbleeth, whom she partnered with to open the night club Harlow's in 1972. The club was immediately popular; The Philadelphia Inquirer later wrote that "every celebrity who ever spent a night in Philadelphia in the early ‘70s partied at Harlow’s." That same year, Harlow received a vaginoplasty at Yonkers Professional Hospital in New York City, which was reported on by multiple newspapers, and legally changed her first name to Rachel.

In 1975, Harlow closed her nightclub, having grown tired of the coverage of her in the local tabloids. She married French pastry chef Gerard Billebault in 1981. In 1989 the couple opened a supper club, also called Harlow's, at the Philadelphia Bourse. However, the stress of running the restaurant put a strain on their relationship and they separated in the early 90s. She has lived in Philadelphia ever since, largely out of the public eye.

== Romance with Jack Kelly Jr. ==
In 1972, former Olympic athlete and Philadelphia mayoral candidate Jack Kelly Jr. met Harlow at her nightclub and quickly took a liking to her. He introduced her to his family, including his sister Grace Kelly, and gave her a diamond ring for her 24th birthday.

However, his mother, Margaret Majer, was unsupportive of the relationship due to Harlow's transgender status and forbid them from marrying. To prevent the scandal from coming to light, she pledged to financially support Kelly's opponent Frank Rizzo and threatened to withhold any further donations from the Democratic Party if they endorsed Kelly's candidacy. Additionally Rizzo was planning to attack Kelly by running billboards that read "Do We Really Need Rachel Harlow as a First Lady?" This put an end to Kelly's political ambitions as he withdrew from the race and would never run for political office again. Harlow and Kelly separated soon after.

As of 2025, Harlow is compiling her memoirs and working with producers Christine Vachon, Liz Levine, and Adrian Salpeter on a film about her and Kelly's relationship.
