= Robert Helmick =

American lawyer (1937–2003)

President of the United States Olympic Committee
- In office March 22, 1985 – September 18, 1991
- Preceded by: John B. Kelly Jr.
- Succeeded by: William Hybl

President of the International Swimming Federation
- In office 1984–1988
- Preceded by: Ante Lambaša
- Succeeded by: Mustapha Larfaoui

Personal details
- Born: March 5, 1937 Des Moines, Iowa, US
- Died: April 15, 2003 (aged 66) Des Moines, Iowa, US

Robert Hanna Helmick (March 5, 1937 – April 15, 2003) was an American lawyer and sports administrator who served as the president of the International Swimming Federation from 1984 to 1988, and of the United States Olympic Committee from 1985 to 1991. He was forced to resign from the latter role after alleged conflicts of interest involving his law firm's clients were reported.

== Biography ==
Helmick was born on March 5, 1937, in Des Moines, Iowa, the son of Drake University physics professor Paul Streeper Helmick and mathematics teacher Dorothy Helmick. He attended Roosevelt High School, where he played on the school's water polo team. Helmick graduated from Drake University Law School in 1960, and became both a local practicing attorney and the coach of Drake's water polo team.

In 1969, Helmick was chosen to chair the Men's Water Polo Committee of the Amateur Athletic Union (AAU). He managed the United States men's national water polo team during the 1972 Summer Olympics in Munich, where the team won the bronze medal. In 1973, he was appointed as a member of the executive board of the United States Olympic Committee (USOC). The following year, he was elected as the second vice president of the AAU. Helmick was promoted to first vice president in 1976 and president of the AAU in 1978. In this role, he supported the passage of the Amateur Sports Act of 1978, which legislated the responsibilities of both the USOC and the AAU, and was an outspoken opponent of the U.S.-led 1980 Summer Olympics boycott. His term as president ended in 1980.

Helmick was simultaneously a member of the International Swimming Federation (FINA), being appointed as chairman of its Technical Water Polo Committee in 1972. He became the organization's Honorary Secretary in 1976, and then served as its president from 1984 to 1988.

In February 1985, Helmick was elected as the first vice president of the Administrative Committee of the USOC, succeeding John B. Kelly Jr., who became the USOC's president. After Kelly's unexpected death three weeks later, Helmick was nominated as his successor, and was elected president of the USOC on March 22, 1985. In June of that year, he was elected as one of the two U.S. delegates to the International Olympic Committee during the 90th IOC Session in East Berlin, replacing Douglas Roby.

As president of the USOC, Helmick pressed for greater financial support for America's Olympic athletes. After a disappointing showing by U.S. athletes at the 1988 Winter Olympics in Calgary, Helmick appointed New York Yankees owner George Steinbrenner as the head of a committee assessing how American athletic performance could be improved in time for 1992. The Olympic Overview Commission recommended tuition assistance for top college athletes and cash payments to amateurs needing time to train, and these changes were later credited as aiding the success of U.S. athletes at subsequent Olympics.

Helmick did not receive a salary from his USOC position, and for much of his presidency, he continued to maintain his private practice as an attorney for the Des Moines law firm of Belin, Harris, Helmick, Lamson, McCormick. Some figures in international sport hired the firm as legal representation, drawing suspicion as to why clients from around the world would choose an obscure Iowa business for these purposes. On April 1, 1991, Helmick left the firm and became a partner at Washington, D.C.-based Dorsey & Whitney, taking many of his clients with him. Other executives of the USOC were unaware of Helmick's confidential relationships with these clients until August 1991, when two reporters from USA Today began to investigate the matter. Upon learning that the newspaper was planning to write about his business dealings, he called many of his fellow USOC board members to disclose the names of his clients to them.

The matter was first publicly reported by USA Today and The New York Times on September 5, followed by a more detailed description of Helmick's dealings in USA Today on September 6. The latter highlighted specific clients, particularly Turner Broadcasting Company, which paid Helmick tens of thousands of dollars as a consultant on international sport organization, beginning in 1987. Turner had created the Goodwill Games in 1986, an alternative to the Olympics, which was initially opposed by the USOC. Helmick later changed his stance, allowing U.S. sports federations to participate in the Goodwill Games. Turner was also considered as a potential broadcaster for the 1996 Summer Olympics. This report was released the day before a USOC board meeting in Chicago on September 7, which was devoted almost entirely to discussion of how to handle the controversy. At the end of that session, the USOC released a statement saying that Helmick had not misused his position as president. Helmick apologized for "any actions [...] which could have given an appearance of conflict" and said that he would terminate his relationships with the clients in question.

The USOC appointed former Deputy Attorney General Arnold Burns as special counsel to review Helmick's records for any misconduct. On September 13, USA Today reported that Helmick had admitted to two more relationships with clients that had not previously been disclosed. Altogether, these clients had paid Helmick more than $277,000 (equivalent to $655,000 in 2025) for his consulting services. The following day, although he continued to deny that there had been any conflict of interest, Helmick announced that he would not run for re-election as USOC president in 1992, stepping down at the end of his term. On September 18, facing criticism from U.S. sport federation leaders, Helmick resigned from the presidency of the USOC. He was succeeded in the role by William Hybl. The Burns report was published on November 24, concluding that Helmick had violated the USOC bylaws against conflicts of interest on several occasions.

Before the allegations, Helmick had been an influential member of the IOC and was considered a potential successor for IOC president Juan Antonio Samaranch. The IOC began its own investigation into Helmick's conduct and, after the publication of the Burns report, was expected to discuss potentially removing him from his post in a meeting at its headquarters in Lausanne, Switzerland, on December 6. Helmick stepped down from his position at the IOC on December 3, 1991, slipping his letter of resignation under Samaranch's door in the middle of the night and leaving IOC headquarters for the last time early that morning.

Helmick continued to serve as a member of the USOC board as president emeritus for the remainder of his life. He died on April 15, 2003, at a Des Moines hospital after suffering a stroke. Helmick Commons, a building at his alma mater Drake University, was named after him in 2002.
