= Faidon Matthaiou =

Greek basketball player and coach

Faidon Matthaiou Φαίδων Ματθαίου
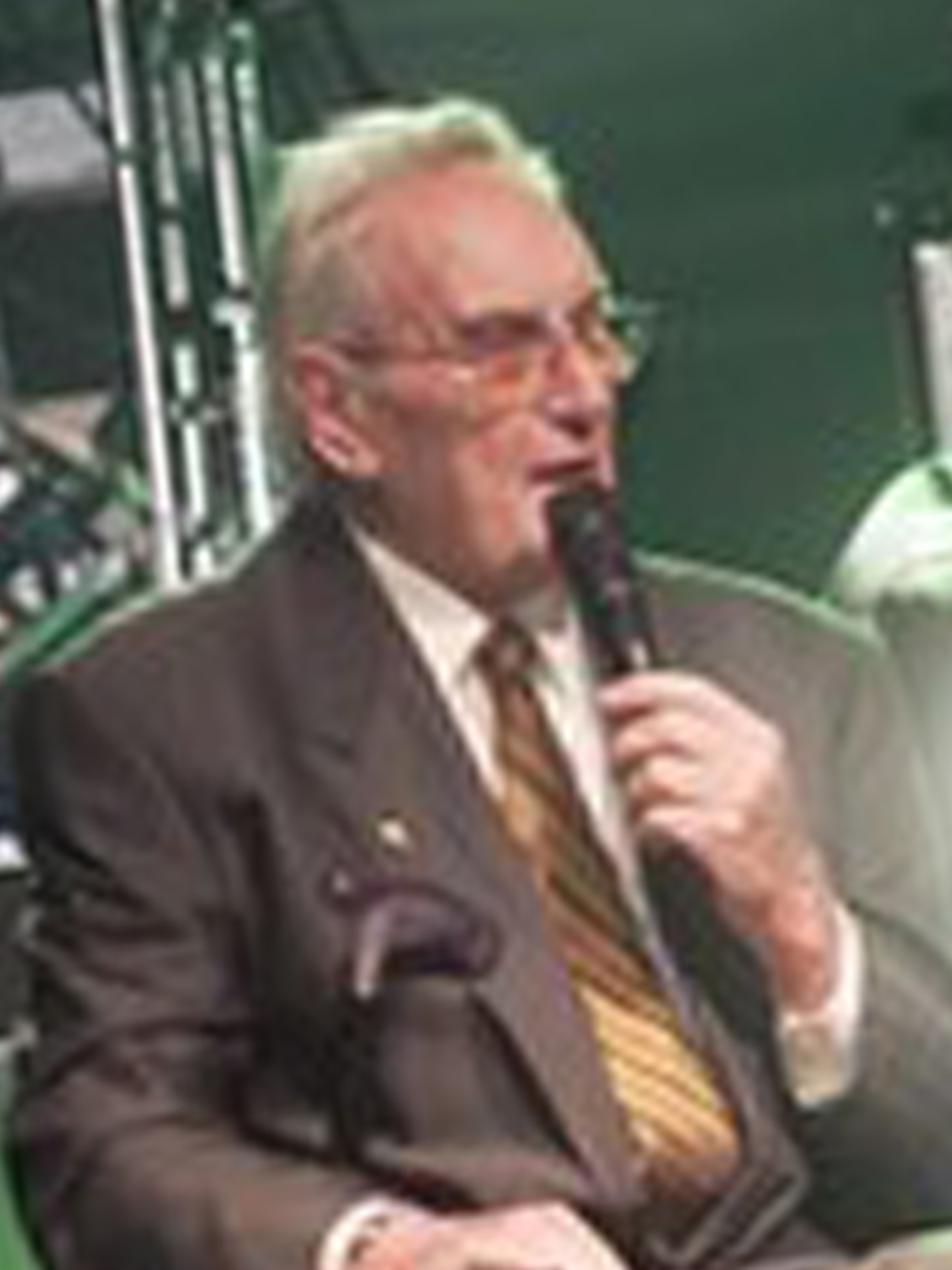
- Matthaiou, in 2009.

Personal information
- Born: 12 July 1924 Thessaloniki, Greece
- Died: 17 September 2011 (aged 87) Thessaloniki, Greece

Career information
- Playing career: 1945–1957
- Position: Point guard / center
- Number: 1
- Coaching career: 1955–1984

Career history

Playing
- 1945–49: Aris Thessaloniki
- 1949–55: Panathinaikos Athens
- 1955: Panionios Athens
- 1955: Sporting Athens
- 1955: Panionios Athens
- 1955–56: Storm Varese
- 1956–57: Aris Thessaloniki

Coaching
- 1955–56: Storm Varese
- 1960–61: Virtus Aurelia
- 1961–69: Greece
- 1967–70 1971–73: Olympiacos Piraeus
- 1973–74: Aris Thessaloniki
- 1974–76: Olympiacos Piraeus
- 1976–78: Panionios Athens
- 1978–79: AEK Athens
- 1980–81: Olympiacos Piraeus
- 1983–84: PAOK Thessaloniki
- 1984–85: Olympiacos Piraeus

Career highlights
- As a player: International Club Cup Tournament Top Scorer (1955); International Club Cup Tournament MVP (1955); 3× Greek League champion (1950, 1951, 1954); As a head coach: 2× FIBA European Selection (1970, 1973); Greek League champion (1976); 2× Greek Cup winner (1976, 1984); Greek 3rd Division champion (1978)
Medals
Men's basketball
Representing Greece
FIBA EuroBasket
Bronze medal – third place	1949 Egypt
Mediterranean Games
Bronze medal – third place	1955 Spain

Faidon Matthaiou, (alternate spellings: Feidon, Fedon, Mathaiou, Mattheou; Greek: Φαίδων Ματθαίου: 12 July 1924 – 17 September 2011) was a Greek professional basketball player and coach. He was a center at the start of his career, and at the end of his career, he also played as a point guard. He wore the number 1 jersey throughout his career. He represented Greece twice at the Summer Olympic Games. As a rower at the 1948 Summer Olympics, and as a basketball player at the 1952 Summer Olympics.

Faidon Matthaiou is widely considered to be the Patriarch of Greek basketball.

== Athletic career ==
Born in Thessaloniki, Greece, Matthaiou is considered to have been one of the greatest Greek athletes of all time. He was a multi-sport athlete that competed in the sports of volleyball, water polo, track and field, rowing, shooting, cycling, fencing, tennis, table tennis, and basketball, which was the sport that he was the most well-known for competing in.

He represented Greece in the Summer Olympic Games in two different sports. He competed at the 1948 London Summer Olympic Games as a rower, and also in the 1952 Helsinki Summer Olympic Games, as a basketball player.

== Club basketball career ==
Matthaiou began playing professional basketball, as well as many other sports, with the Greek club Aris Thessaloniki in 1945. His father was Manthos Matthaiou, who was the President of the Aris Thessaloniki Sports Club, who was killed in 1941, during the Italian air bombings of Thessaloniki, during the Greco-Italian War. In 1949, Matthaiou transferred to the Greek club Panathinaikos Athens. He also played with the Greek club Panionios Athens, the Italian League club Varese, and the Greek club Sporting Athens.

With Panathinaikos, Matthaiou won 3 Greek League championships, in the years 1950, 1951, and 1954. He also played at the International Club Cup Tournament (the forerunner of the EuroLeague) in 1955, at the Viareggio Tournament, where he was the leading scorer and MVP.

== National basketball team career ==
Matthaiou played for the senior men's Greek national team, as one of its leading members in 44 games, and he scored a total of 539 points in those games, for a scoring average of 12.3 points per game. He also played in the very first official game of the Greek national team, which was played at the 1949 FIBA EuroBasket. He was the team's leading scorer at that tournament, with 66 total points scored, while Greece also won the tournament's bronze medal. Matthaiou participated as a player in two FIBA EuroBasket tournaments, the 1949 FIBA EuroBasket, and also the 1951 FIBA EuroBasket, and also in the 1952 FIBA Summer Olympics.

== Basketball coaching career ==
After his playing career ended, Matthaiou was the head coach of the senior men's Greek national team at three FIBA EuroBasket tournaments, the 1961 FIBA EuroBasket, the 1965 FIBA EuroBasket, and the 1969 FIBA EuroBasket. He also coached professional sport clubs of the Greek League, such as Olympiacos Piareus, AEK Athens, PAOK Thessaloniki, and Peristeri Athens. He also coached the Italian League clubs Storm Varèse and Virtus Roma.

Matthaiou was named as a coach of the FIBA European Selection team in the years 1970 and 1973. He won both the Greek Cup title and the Greek League championship with Olympiacos, in 1976. In 1978, he won the Greek 3rd Division championship with Peristeri. He also won the Greek Cup title with PAOK, in 1984.

== Awards and accomplishments in basketball ==
=== Clubs ===
- 3× Greek League Champion: (1950, 1951, 1954)
- Viareggio International Cup Tournament (EuroLeague's predecessor) Top Scorer: (1955)
- Viareggio International Cup Tournament (EuroLeague's predecessor) MVP: (1955)

=== Greece national team ===
- 1949 FIBA EuroBasket: Bronze
- 1955 Mediterranean Games: Bronze

=== Clubs ===
- 2× FIBA European Selection: (1970, 1973)
- 2× Greek Cup Winner: (1976, 1984)
- Greek League Champion: (1976)
- Greek 3rd Division Champion: (1978)
