= Ed Temple =

American track coach

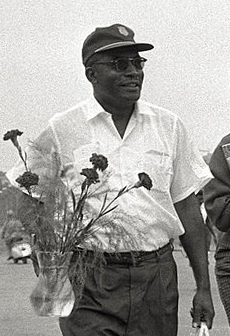
- Ed Temple at the 1960 Olympics
- Born: Edward Stanley Temple; September 20, 1927; Harrisburg, Pennsylvania, U.S.
- Died: September 22, 2016 (aged 89); Nashville, Tennessee, U.S.
- Education: Tennessee State University
- Occupation: Women's track and field coach

Edward Stanley Temple (September 20, 1927 – September 22, 2016) was a women's track and field pioneer and coach. Temple was Head Women's Track and Field Coach at Nashville's Tennessee State University for 44 years and was Head Coach of the U.S. Olympic Women's Track and Field Team twice, in 1960 and 1964, and Assistant Coach in 1980. He was also a member of the International Women's Track & Field Committee and a member of the U.S. Olympic Council.

During his coaching career at Tennessee State University, forty members of the famed Tigerbelle teams represented their countries in Olympic competition. Coach Temple led the team to 34 national titles, and 8 Tigerbelles have been inducted into the National Track and Field Hall of Fame, including Wilma Rudolph, Edith McGuire, Wyomia Tyus, and Chandra Cheeseborough, the current Women's Coach at TSU.

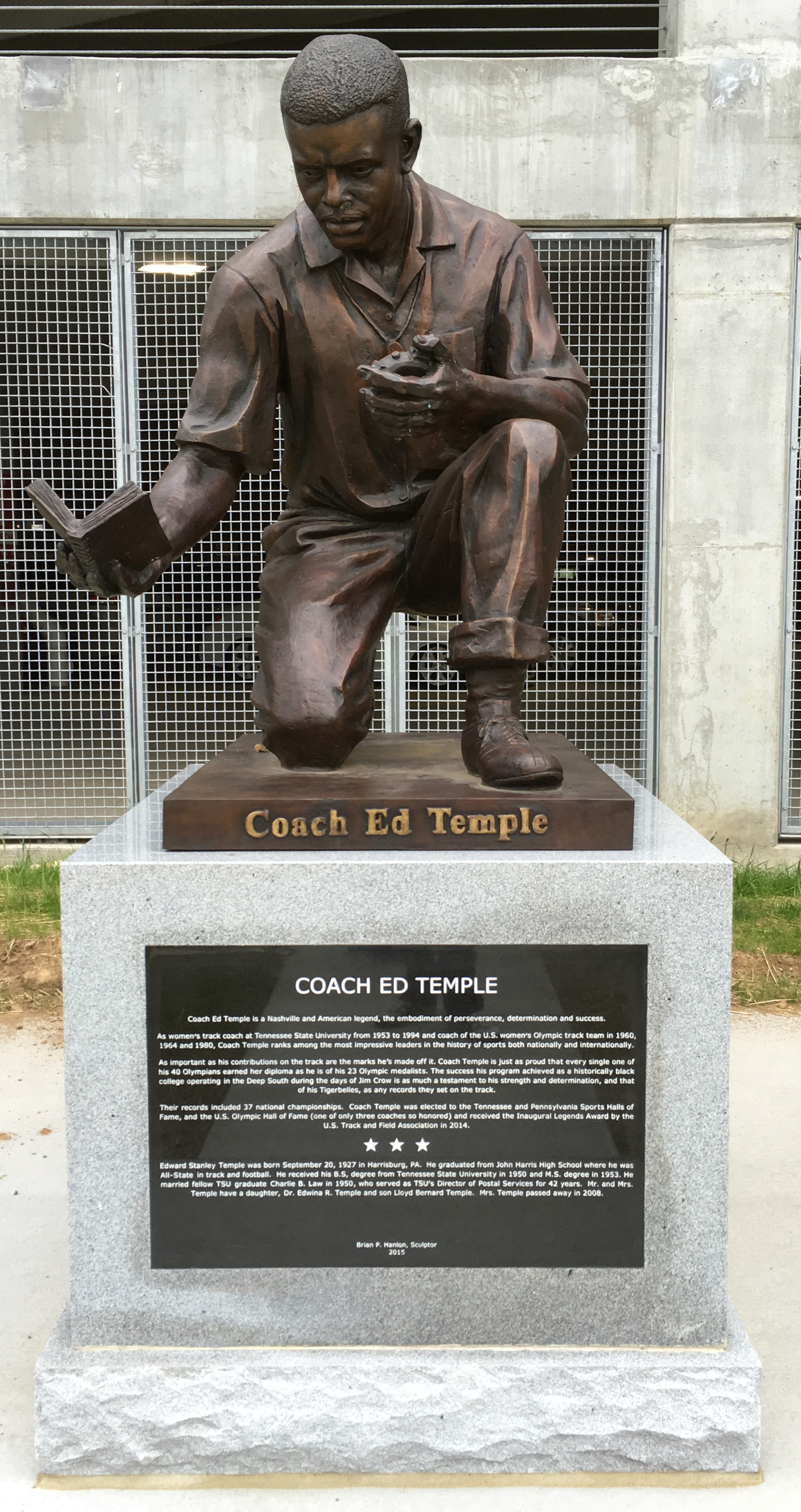
The Coach Ed Temple statue at First Horizon Park in Nashville

Temple is a member of nine different Halls of Fame, including the United States Olympic Hall of Fame, the National Track and Field Hall of Fame, the Tennessee Sports Hall of Fame, and the Pennsylvania Sports Hall of Fame. On August 28, 2015, a statue to memorialize Temple was unveiled along a greenway near the right field entrance to First Horizon Park, a Minor League Baseball stadium in Nashville. In 2014, Temple was honoured by becoming the first USA Track & Field Legend Coach.

Temple is portrayed by Jason Bernard in the 1977 film, Wilma (also known as The Story of Wilma Rudolph), produced by Bud Greenspan, a made-for-television docudrama adaptation of her autobiography starring Shirley Jo Finney as Rudolph and costarring Cicely Tyson, Jason Bernard, and Denzel Washington in one of his first roles.

Temple died on September 22, 2016, following an illness, two days after his 89th birthday.
