= United States Olympic & Paralympic Hall of Fame =

U.S.A. Olympic & Paralympic Hall Of Fame

Coordinates: 38.8328°N 104.8235°W

The United States Olympic & Paralympic Hall of Fame is an honor roll of the top American Olympic and Paralympic athletes headquartered at the United States Olympic & Paralympic Museum, opened in April 2020 in Colorado Springs, Colorado.

The Hall of Fame was established by the United States Olympic & Paralympic Committee in 1979; the first members were inducted in 1983. Between 1992 and 2003, the Hall of Fame went dormant, with no induction of new members. In 2004, the honor was revived, and continued in 2005 when the Class of 2006 was selected. Currently, elections are held every two years.

The current process for selecting inductees is two-staged. Fifteen finalists are selected by a nominating committee consisting of athletes, members of the U.S. Olympic Hall of Fame, historians and USOC representatives. The inductees were then selected based on online voting at www.usolympicteam.com, with a requirement to select five individual athletes, one team, one Paralympian and one coach. When the inductees are announced, a veteran and a "special contributor" are also included.

As of 2022, total membership has been brought to 119 Olympians and Paralympians, 11 teams, five coaches, 10 veterans, 19 contributors and two Olive Branch award inductees.

== Inducted as individuals ==
- Tenley Albright (figure skating)
- Cassius Clay (boxing)
- Evelyn Ashford (track & field)
- Shirley Babashoff (swimming)
- Bruce Baumgartner (wrestling)
- Bob Beamon (track & field)
- Joan Benoit (track & field)
- Matt Biondi (swimming)
- Bonnie Blair (speed skating)
- Brian Boitano (figure skating)
- Ralph Boston (track & field)
- Dick Button (figure skating)
- Candace Cable (Para alpine skiing, Para Nordic skiing, Para track & field)
- Lee Calhoun (track & field)
- Milt Campbell (track & field)
- John Carlos (track & field)
- Connie Carpenter-Phinney (cycling, speed skating)
- Steve Cash (sled hockey)
- Tracy Caulkins (swimming)
- Alice Coachman (track & field)
- Bart Conner (gymnastics)
- James Brendan Connolly (track & field)
- Natalie Coughlin (swimming)
- Charles Daniels (swimming)
- Willie Davenport (track & field)
- Glenn Davis (track & field)
- John Davis (weight lifting)
- Muffy Davis (Para-alpine skiing and Para-cycling)
- Oscar de La Hoya (boxing)
- Donna de Varona (swimming)
- Gail Devers (track & field)
- Babe Didrikson (track & field)
- Harrison Dillard (track & field)
- Gabrielle Douglas (gymnastics)
- Jean Driscoll (Para track & field)
- Eddie Eagan (bobsledding, boxing)
- Teresa Edwards (basketball)
- Janet Evans (swimming)
- Lee Evans (track & field)
- Ray Ewry (track & field)
- Allyson Felix (track & field)
- Lisa Fernandez (softball)
- Peggy Fleming (figure skating)
- George Foreman (boxing)
- Dick Fosbury (track & field)
- Gretchen Fraser (alpine skiing)
- Joe Frazier (boxing)
- Dan Gable (wrestling)
- Rowdy Gaines (swimming)
- Diana Golden Brosnihan (Paralympic skiing)
- Florence Griffith-Joyner (track & field)
- Susan Hagel (Para archery, para track & field and wheelchair basketball)
- Gary Hall, Jr. (swimming)
- Dorothy Hamill (figure skating)
- Scott Hamilton (figure skating)
- Mia Hamm (soccer)
- Bob Hayes (track & field)
- Eric Heiden (speed skating)
- Carol Heiss Jenkins (figure skating)
- Flo Hyman (volleyball)
- Dan Jansen (speed skating)
- Bruce Jenner (track & field)
- Michael Johnson (track & field)
- Rafer Johnson (track & field)
- Jackie Joyner-Kersee (track & field)
- Duke Kahanamoku (swimming)
- John B. Kelly Sr. (rowing)
- David Kiley (Para alpine skiing, Para track and field, and wheelchair basketball)
- Micki King (diving)
- Roger Kingdom (track and field)
- Karch Kiraly (volleyball)
- Tommy Kono (weight lifting)
- Alvin Kraenzlein (track & field)
- Michelle Kwan (figure skating)
- Sammy Lee (diving)
- Sugar Ray Leonard (boxing)
- Lisa Leslie (basketball)
- Carl Lewis (track & field)
- Kristine Lilly (soccer)
- Nastia Liukin (gymnastics)
- Greg Louganis (diving)
- Helene Madison (swimming)
- Phil Mahre (alpine skiing)
- Bob Mathias (track & field)
- Misty May-Treanor (beach volleyball)
- Pat McCormick (diving)
- Andrea Mead Lawrence (alpine skiing)
- Mary T. Meagher (swimming)
- Debbie Meyer (swimming)
- Bode Miller (alpine skiing)
- Shannon Miller (gymnastics)
- Billy Mills (track & field)
- John Morgan (Paralympic swimming)
- Bobby Morrow (track & field)
- Edwin Moses (track & field)
- John Naber (swimming)
- Dan O'Brien (track & field)
- Parry O'Brien (track & field)
- Al Oerter (track & field)
- Apolo Anton Ohno (short track speed skating)
- Jesse Owens (track & field)
- Charley Paddock (track & field)
- Floyd Patterson (boxing)
- Michael Phelps (swimming)
- J. Michael Plumb (equestrian)
- Erin Popovich (Para swimming)
- Mary Lou Retton (gymnastics)
- Bob Richards (track & field)
- David Robinson (basketball)
- Wilma Rudolph (track & field)
- Marla Runyan (para track and field, track & field)
- Don Schollander (swimming)
- Jack Shea (speed skating)
- Mel Sheppard (track & field)
- Frank Shorter (track & field)
- Tommie Smith (track & field)
- Randy Snow (Paralympic basketball, tennis, track & field)
- Mark Spitz (swimming)
- Picabo Street (alpine skiing)
- Jenny Thompson (swimming)
- Jim Thorpe (track & field)
- Bill Toomey (track & field)
- Dara Torres (swimming)
- Wyomia Tyus (track & field)
- Amy Van Dyken (swimming)
- Peter Vidmar (gymnastics)
- Lindsey Vonn (alpine skiing)
- Chris Waddell (Para alpine skiing, Para track & field)
- Kerri Walsh Jennings (volleyball)
- Johnny Weissmuller (swimming)
- Willye White (track & field)
- Mal Whitfield (track & field)
- Lones Wigger (shooting)
- Sarah Will (Paralympic alpine skiing)
- Serena Williams (tennis)
- Frank Wykoff (track & field)
- Kristi Yamaguchi (figure skating)
- Trischa Zorn-Hudson (Para swimming)

== Inducted as teams ==
- 1956 Men's Basketball team
- 1960 Ice Hockey team
- 1960 Men's Basketball team
- 1964 Men's Basketball team
- 1976 Women's 4×100 Freestyle Relay Swimming team
- 1980 Ice Hockey team
- 1984 Men's Gymnastics team
- 1992 Men's Basketball team
- 1996 Women's Gymnastics team (Magnificent Seven)
- 1996 Women's Soccer team
- 1998 Women's Ice Hockey team
- 2002 Paralympic Sled Hockey team
- 2004 Women's Softball team
- 2004 United States Women's Wheelchair Basketball Team
- 2010 United States Four Man Bobsled Team

== Inducted as coaches ==
- Herb Brooks (ice hockey)
- Carlo Fassi (figure skating)
- Abie Grossfeld (gymnastics)
- Mike Krzyzewski (basketball)
- Ron O'Brien (diving)
- Pat Summitt (basketball)
- Ed Temple (track & field)

== Inducted as contributors ==
- Roone Arledge
- Avery Brundage
- Asa Smith Bushnell III
- Anita DeFrantz
- James L. Easton
- Dick Ebersol
- Bud Greenspan
- Col. Don Hull
- Hank Iba
- Robert Kane
- John B. Kelly Jr.
- Phil Knight
- Frank Marshall
- Jim McKay
- Billie Jean King
- F. Don Miller
- Tim Nugent (special contributor)
- William Simon
- Ted Stevens
- Peter Ueberroth
- LeRoy Walker

== Olive Branch Award ==
- James L. Easton
- Kevan Gosper

== See also ==
- USOC Athlete of the Year
- USOC Coach of the Year
