= Jean Séphériadès =

French rower (1922–2001)

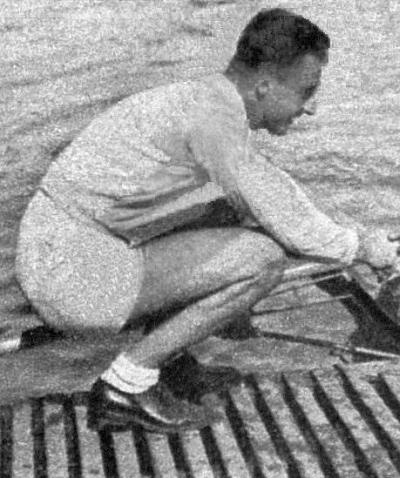
- Séphériadès in 1943

Personal information
- Born: 2 January 1922 Paris
- Died: 22 August 2001 (aged 79) Courbevoie

Sport
- Sport: Rowing
Medal record
Men's rowing
Representing France
European Rowing Championships
Gold medal – first place	1947 Lucerne	Single sculls

Jean Séphériadès (2 January 1922 – 22 August 2001) was a French rower who competed at the 1948 Summer Olympics.

Séphériadès was born in Paris. He rowed for SN Basse Seine in the single scull and was rowing champion of France from 1942 to 1946. In the closing stages of World War II he served in the Deuxième Division Blindée commanded by General Leclerc.

In 1946 he became the first French winner of the Diamond Challenge Sculls at Henley Royal Regatta beating John B. Kelly Jr. in the final. He rowed in the single scull for France at the 1948 Summer Olympics reaching the semi-final.

Séphériadès was a commercial traveller and lived at Chatou. He died at Courbevoie, Hauts-de-Seine, France at the age of 79.
