= Romolo Catasta =

Italian rower (1923–1985)

Medal record

Men's rowing

Representing Italy

Olympic Games
Bronze medal – third place	1948 London	Single sculls

Romolo Catasta (26 March 1923 – 17 March 1985) was an Italian rower who competed in the 1948 Summer Olympics. Catasta was born in Vienna, Austria, in 1923. In 1948 he won the bronze medal in the single sculls event. Catasta died in Vienna, Austria on 17 March 1985, at the age of 61.
