= Dragutin Petrovečki =

Croatian rower

Personal information
- Nationality: Yugoslavia
- Born: 31 January 1914 Bedekovčina, Austria-Hungary

Sport
- Sport: Rowing

Dragutin Petrovečki (born 31 January 1914, date of death unknown) was a Croatian rower who competed for Yugoslavia. He competed in the men's single sculls event at the 1948 Summer Olympics.
