= Kelly homestead =

Ruins of a house in Drumilra near Newport, County Mayo

Kelly Homestead
- Teachín Uí Cheallaigh
- Location within Ireland

General information
- Status: Ruined
- Type: Stone cottage
- Architectural style: Vernacular
- Location: Drumilra, Newport, County Mayo, Ireland
- Coordinates: 53.87193°N 9.47827°W
- Elevation: 42 m (138 ft)
- Completed: c. 1840s

Technical details
- Material: Stone, mortar
- Floor count: 1

Design and construction
- Known for: Home of John Henry Kelly, grandfather of Grace Kelly

Other information
- Number of rooms: 3

The Kelly homestead is the ruins of a house in the townland of Drumilra (sometimes misspelled Drimurla) near the town of Newport, County Mayo. The cottage has three rooms and overlooks the Leg of Mutton Lake. It is situated on a boreen off the R311 road from Newport to Castlebar.

== The cottage ==
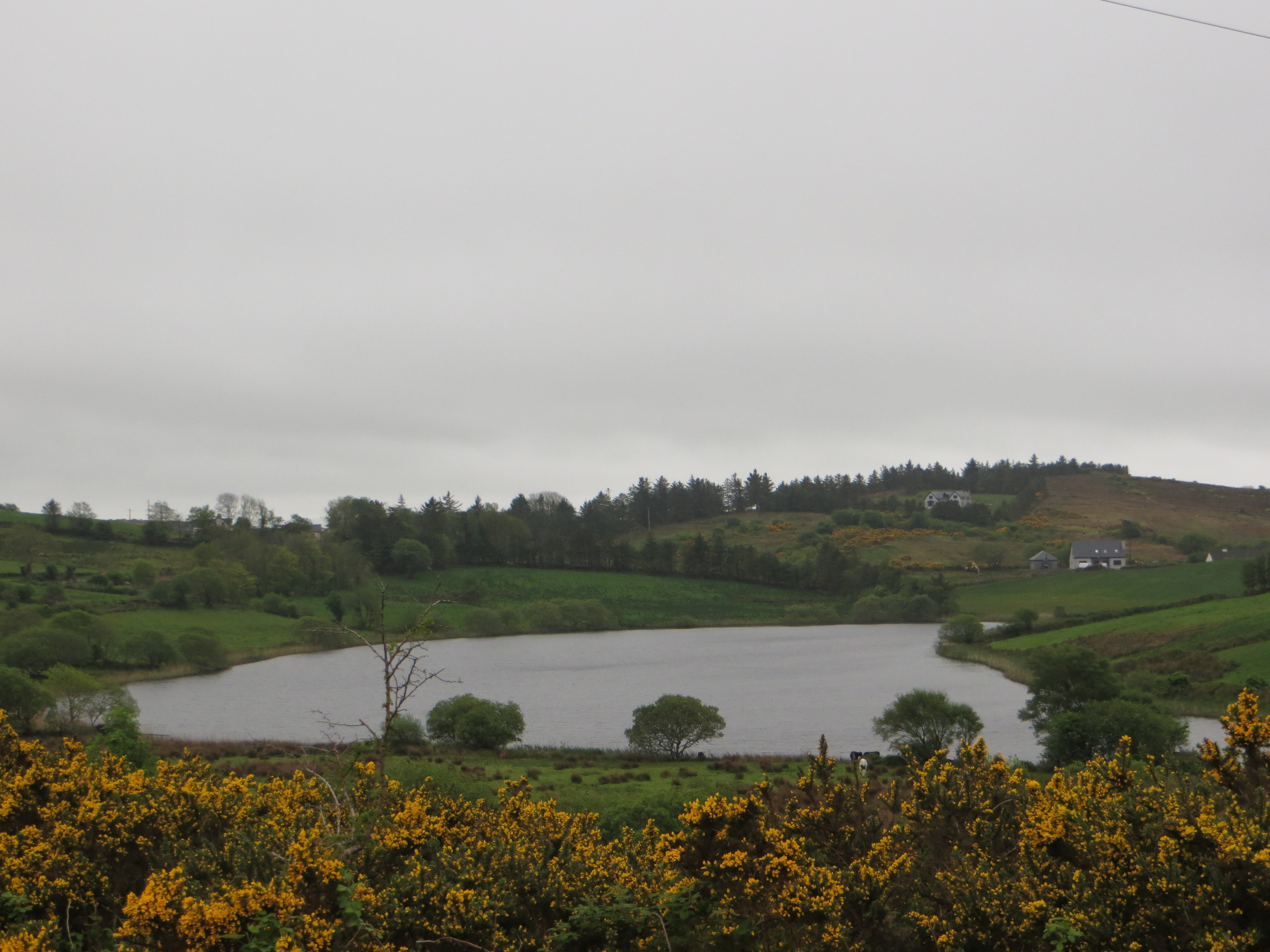
View of Drumgoney Lough from the north.

The cottage is a small rectangular stone cottage with pointed gables and a central chimney, divided into three rooms. It lies in the townland of Drumilra (Irish Droim Iolra, "Eagle Ridge"), immediately southeast of Drumgoney Lough and about 6 kilometres (3.7 mi) east of Clew Bay. Its age is uncertain, but it does not appear on the 6-inch Ordnance Survey map which was the product of an 1837 survey.

Writing in the American Journal of Irish Studies, Mary Burke felt that the cottage "is not a conventional tourist attraction" and its location has "almost certainly intentionally" remained unsignposted due to its dilapidated state "[drawing] attention to aspects of Irish history often effaced or downplayed by tourism interests".

== Association with Princess Grace ==
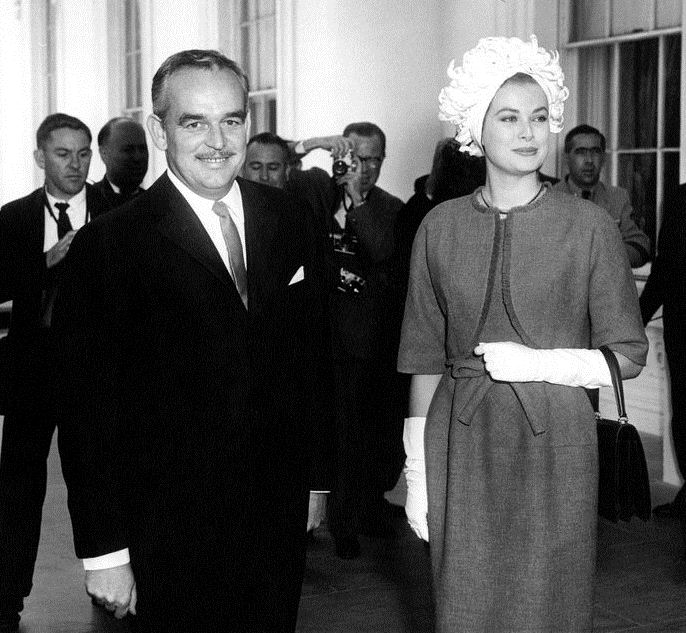
Prince Rainier and Princess Grace in 1961

The house is the ancestral home of the family of the actress Grace Kelly, who upon her marriage to Prince Rainier III of Monaco became Princess Grace of Monaco. Her grandfather, John Henry Kelly, had emigrated from Drumilra to Pennsylvania in the United States in 1887 in the wake of the Great Famine.

=== 1961, 1976 and 1979 visits ===
Grace and her husband visited the house on 15 June 1961 during their state visit to Ireland. The owner of the cottage, the elderly 'Widow Mulchrone’ had spent the morning on the day of Kelly's visit baking griddle cakes for her guests and polishing her china and glassware. The roof of the cottage had been freshly thatched and the hedges had been cut prior to the royal couple's arrival. Mulchrone's bedroom, which she called "the good room" was set for tea with cups and saucers which she served with cakes and soda bread. A large black kettle hung boiling over an open fire. Mulchrone told her visitors stories and ordered an "on-duty policeman" to "wet another cup of tay, the prince could murder another drop". Mulchrone regarded the day as the most important of her life and recited a special poem for the occasion. Grace subsequently sent Mulchrone an annual Christmas card.

Grace subsequently visited the cottage in 1976 and 1979. Grace visited Mulchrone in the MacBride Home for the Elderly on her 1976 visit. She bought the cottage and its 35 acres of land for IR£7,800 from Mulchrone in June 1976.

The Mayo County Council granted Grace planning permission to build a 2,000 sq ft house on the site in 1978. A holiday home was planned and architectural and landscaping plans drawn up by architect Simon Kelly were examined by Grace and her husband on their 1979 visit. Construction never began on the house and Grace was killed in a car crash in 1982. The local residents of Drumilra sent a wreath of wild flowers picked in the fields around the village to Monaco for Grace's funeral.

=== Recent history ===
Grace's three children, Princess Caroline, Prince Albert, and Princess Stéphanie, inherited the property after their mother's death. In 1995 they announced that they would consider plans for the protection and potential restoration of their homestead. The house has been regarded as derelict in recent years and was described in a 2011 article in the Irish Examiner as "little more than a heap of stones". Prince Albert visited the house with his wife, Princess Charlene, in April 2011 and later met distant cousins in Newport.
