= Mohamed El-Sayed (rower) =

Egyptian rower (born 1924)

Hamza Amera
Personal information
- Full name: Mohamed Hamza Amera El-Sayed
- Nationality: Egyptian
- Born: 20 June 1924

Sport
- Sport: Rowing

Hamza Amera (born 20 June 1924) is an Egyptian rower who competed at the 1948 and 1952 Summer Olympics.
