= Jack Kelly Sr. (rower) =

American Olympic rower (1889–1960)

John B. Kelly Sr.
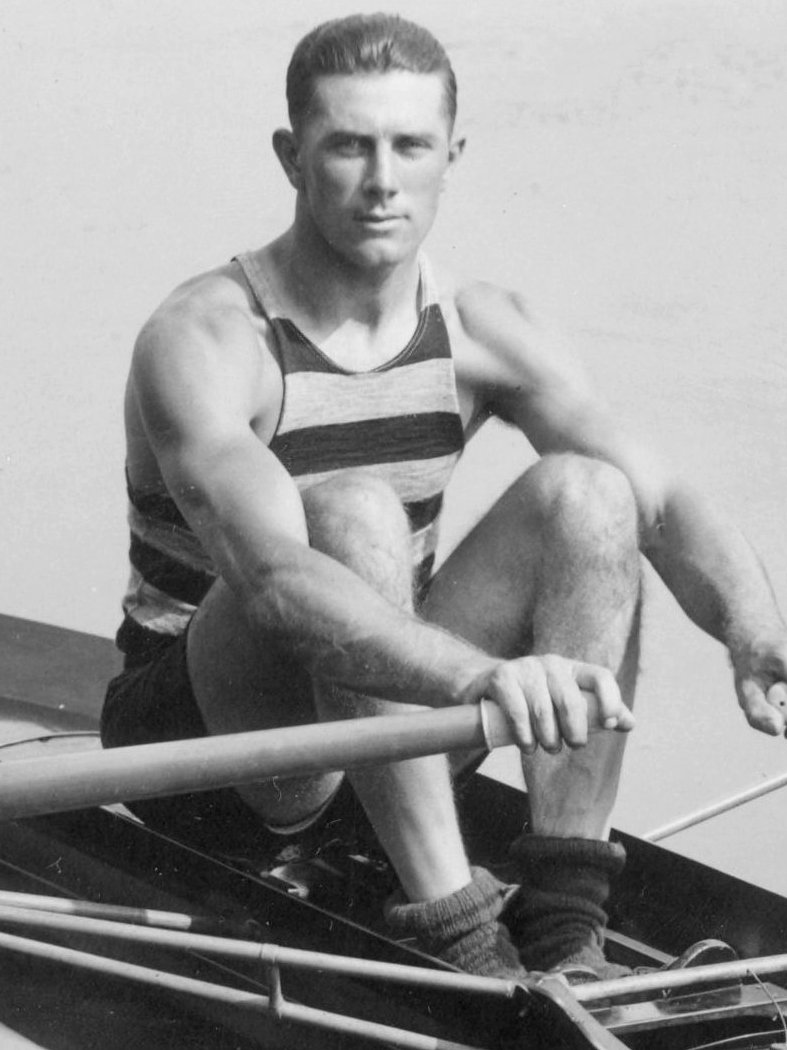
- Kelly in 1920

Pennsylvania Secretary of Revenue
- In office January 6, 1936 – June 14, 1937
- Governor: George Howard Earle III
- Preceded by: Harry Ellis Kalodner
- Succeeded by: J. Griffith Boardman

Personal details
- Born: October 4, 1889 Philadelphia, Pennsylvania, U.S.
- Died: June 20, 1960 (aged 70) Philadelphia, Pennsylvania, U.S.
- Resting place: Holy Sepulchre Cemetery, Cheltenham Township, Pennsylvania, U.S.
- Party: Democratic
- Height: 6 ft 2 in (1.88 m)
- Spouse: Margaret Katherine Majer (m. 1924)
- Relatives: Grace Kelly (daughter); Jack Jr. (son); George Kelly (playwright) (brother); Walter C. Kelly (brother); Albert II, Prince of Monaco (grandson)

Medal record

Men's rowing

Representing the United States

Olympic Games
Gold medal – first place	1920 Antwerp	Single scull
Gold medal – first place	1920 Antwerp	Double scull
Gold medal – first place	1924 Paris	Double scull

Gold Cup Challenge
Gold medal – first place	1920 Philadelphia	Single sculls

John Brendan Kelly Sr. (October 4, 1889 – June 20, 1960) was an American triple Olympic champion, the first in the sport of rowing. The Philadelphia-based Kelly was a multimillionaire in the bricklaying and construction industry, and was involved in politics, serving as Pennsylvania secretary of revenue and running unsuccessfully for mayor of Philadelphia in the 1935 Philadelphia mayoral election.

Kelly had four children. They included actress Grace Kelly, Princess of Monaco (thus Kelly is the maternal grandfather of Albert II, Prince of Monaco), and Jack Kelly Jr., an accomplished rower who served as president of the U.S. Olympic Committee.

== Early life ==
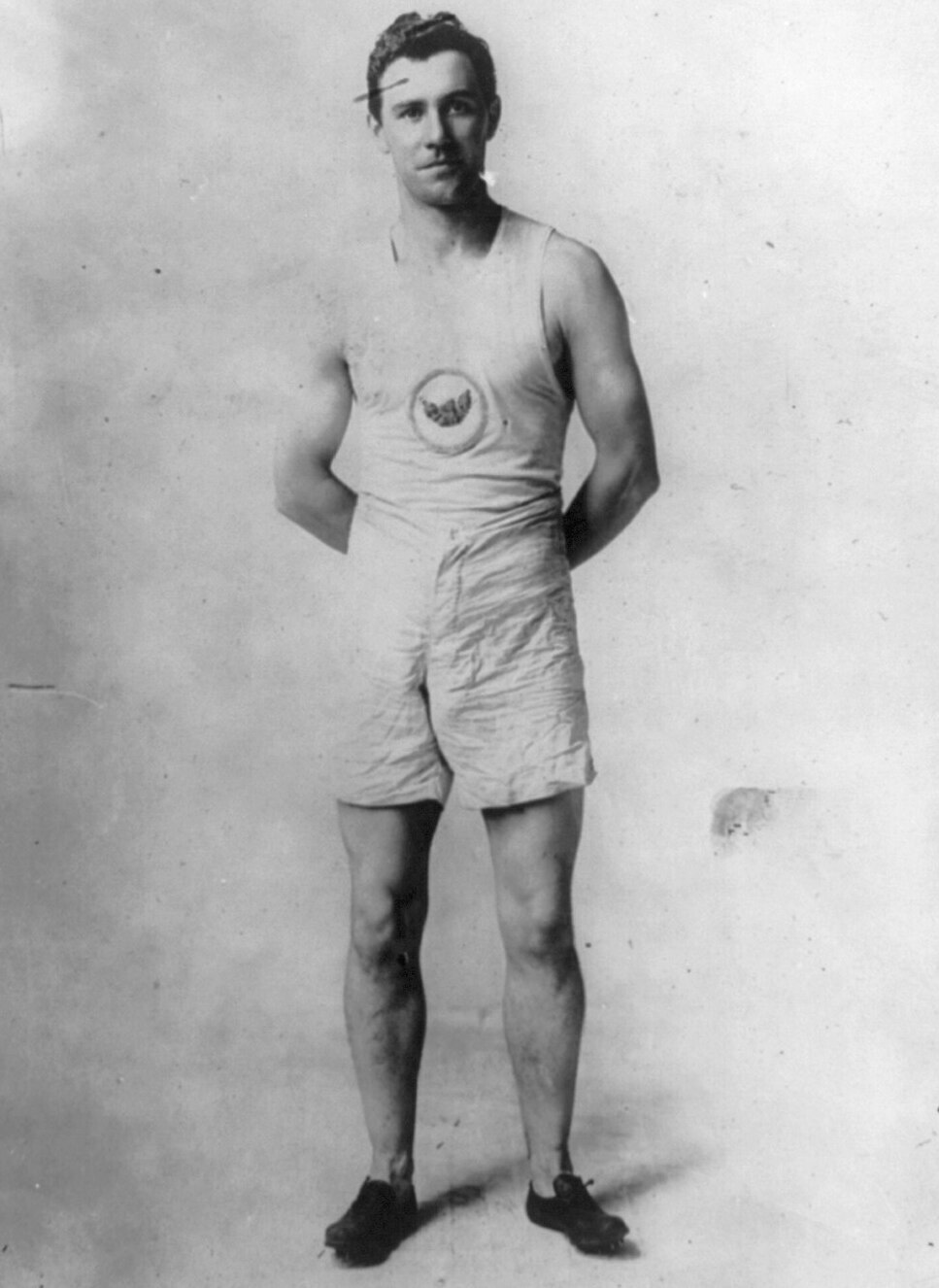
Kelly in 1913

Kelly was born in Philadelphia, one of 10 children of Irish immigrants John Henry Kelly (1847–1917), who emigrated from his homestead near Newport, County Mayo, in 1869, and Mary Ann Costello (1852–1926), who arrived in the U.S. in 1867. He attended public schools and at night attended the Spring Garden Institute.

In 1907, he began bricklaying in Philadelphia as an apprentice at his brother Patrick's construction firm. Standing 6'2", he was a gifted athlete and competed in football and basketball in addition to rowing, which he learned on the Schuylkill River. By 1916, Kelly was a national rowing champion and the best sculler in the United States. As part of the World War I callup, Kelly joined the United States Army as a private in October 1917. He rose to the rank of lieutenant by the time he was discharged in April 1919. While in the Army, Kelly entered the armed forces boxing tournament as a heavyweight and ran up a 12–0 record before being waylaid by a broken ankle. Future world professional boxing champion Gene Tunney won the tournament. In later years, Kelly would kid Tunney: "Aren't you lucky I broke my ankle?"

Following his Army discharge in 1919, Kelly continued dominating the single scull. He also started a brickwork contracting company in Philadelphia, John B. Kelly, Inc., with a $7,000 loan from his brothers George, a future Pulitzer Prize-winning playwright, and Walter, who was a popular vaudeville actor. A self-promoter, Kelly coined the slogan "Kelly for Brickwork", which was often seen at local construction sites.

In 1919, Kelly played professional football for the Holmesburg Athletic Club. The team would win the 1919 and 1920 Philadelphia City Championships. In a 1919 game against a team from Camden, New Jersey, Kelly scored three touchdowns in just the first quarter of the game.

== Rowing career ==
Kelly won 126 straight races in the single scull in 1919 and 1920, a six-time U.S. national champion who was one of the most popular figures in the sport.

=== Rejection by the Henley Royal Regatta ===
In 1920 Kelly applied to race in the Diamond Sculls at the Henley Royal Regatta held annually on the River Thames, the most prestigious event in rowing. Despite his American success and winning streak, the event's organizers rejected his application, citing an earlier dispute with his rowing club and the fact that he had worked as a manual laborer:

The minutes of the regatta's Committee of Management for June 3, 1920, read: "The list of entries ... outside of the United Kingdom under Rule iv was presented ... and received with the exception of Mr J.B. Kelly of the Vesper Boat Club to compete in the Diamond Sculls, which was refused under the resolution passed by the Committee on 7th June, 1906 'viz' 'That no entry from the Vesper Boat Club of Philadelphia, or from any member of their 1905 crew be accepted in future': Mr Kelly was also not qualified under Rule I (e) of the General Rules (manual labour)."

That 1906 resolution banned members of the Vesper Boat Club from the event because their eight-man team in the Grand Challenge Cup had used a public subscription to raise the money to travel to London, breaching the regatta's rule on amateurism.

The regatta committee's minutes also note that they rejected Kelly because he had worked in a manual trade (bricklaying). The regatta's rules on amateurism excluded anyone "who is or ever has been...by trade or employment for wages a mechanic, artisan or labourer." Two days before Kelly was due to sail to the UK, with his passage booked and his boat boxed, he received a telegram which said: "Entry rejected; letter follows." He never received the letter. The Henley Stewards later declared that they had informed the governing board for U.S. rowing as soon as Kelly's entry was processed and that it was not their fault if the information was not passed on.

The affair was widely reported, especially in London, New York and Philadelphia. The Stewards of Henley Royal Regatta came in for heavy criticism. One interpretation was that they had excluded Kelly because they did not want an American to win the Diamonds. The publicity made Kelly widely popular and would later help his bricklaying business. The ban on Vesper Boat Club was rescinded soon afterward, and in 1937, the references in the Henley rules, excluding manual laborers, mechanics, artisans, and menial duties, were deleted.

Kelly was surprised that his entry was rejected. Kelly always maintained that United States rowing officials had assured him his entry would be accepted. In the 1950s, he wrote to Jack Beresford, the winner of the 1920 Henley Diamond Sculls race, the following:

"Russell Johnson, secretary of the NAAO [the governing board for U.S. rowing] had an arrangement with the Henley officials that they would approve all entries from the United States, which he had made during his visit to England in the winter of 1919–20... I asked him to check with the Stewards to see if they would accept my entry because in my earlier days I had served an apprenticeship as a bricklayer. He contacted four of them and they told him to send my entry in; the war had changed the old rule and everything would be all right".

This rejection led Kelly to seek and gain redemption by going to the 1920 Summer Olympics in Antwerp, Belgium, which he had originally not planned to attend.

In 2003, the Princess Grace Challenge Cup was launched by the Henley Royal Regatta as an event for women's quadruple sculls both in recognition of John B. Kelly and in memory of his daughter, Grace.

=== Redemption at the 1920 Olympics ===
Kelly v. Beresford, 1920 Olympics. Kelly bested British champion Jack Beresford, winner of the 1920 Henley Regatta, by a length for the Gold Medal

When he first applied to race at Henley, Kelly told the press that if his entry were accepted, he would go to Henley and most likely skip the Olympics. On learning of his rejection, Kelly was surprised and angered and stated: "I had made all the arrangements to sail for England ... I'll go to the Olympics now for sure. I want to get a crack at the man who wins the diamond sculls."

Kelly soon had his chance, representing the United States at the 1920 Summer Olympics in Antwerp, Belgium. In a hard-fought race, he won the single scull event, extracting a measure of revenge by defeating the winner of the Diamond Sculls, British sculler Jack Beresford. Beresford was one of the most talented oarsmen of the day and would go on to win medals at five Olympics. The race, one of the closest in Olympic history, featured a dramatic duel down the stretch, with Kelly winning by a second. Kelly and Beresford would go on to become good friends. Half an hour after the singles final, Kelly teamed with his cousin Paul Costello to win the double scull (2x) race, a feat which has never been repeated at the Olympic games. After his Olympic victory, Kelly purportedly mailed his racing cap to King George V with the note, "Greetings from a bricklayer", for having been snubbed at Henley.

=== Repeat at the 1924 Olympics ===
In 1924, Kelly and Costello repeated their success, winning the double-scull event at the Summer Olympics in Paris. This made Kelly the first rower to win three Olympic gold medals and one of the most famous and successful athletes of his generation.

== Personal life ==
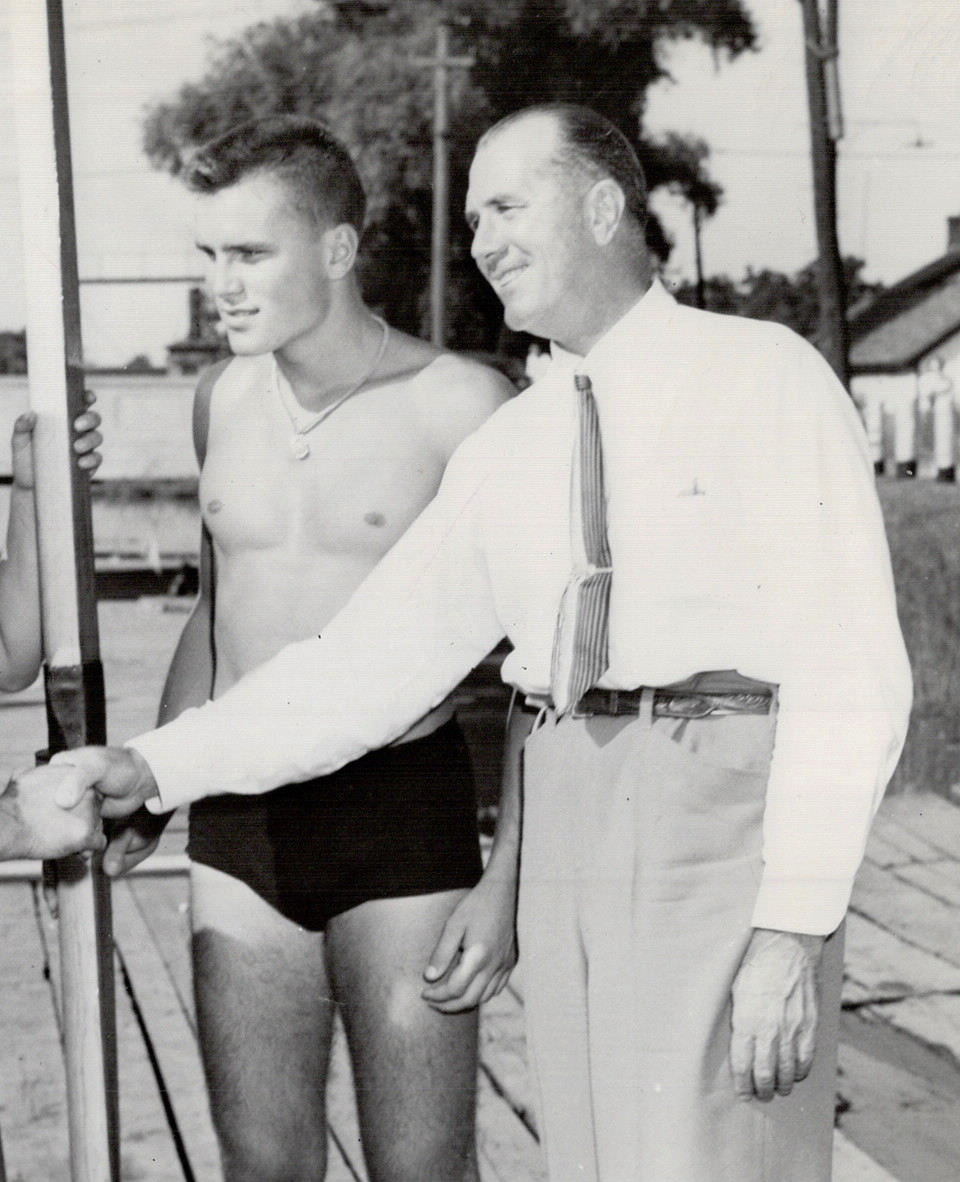
Kelly with his son in 1945

After a long courtship, Kelly married Margaret Katherine Majer (1898–1990) in 1924, daughter of German immigrants. Well-known in the world of sports, she founded women's sports at the University of Pennsylvania. Majer's family was Lutheran, and she converted to Catholicism before the marriage. They had four children: Margaret "Peggy" Katherine (1925–1991), John "Kell" Brendan Jr. (1927–1985), Grace Patricia (1929–1982) and Elizabeth "Lizanne" Anne (1933–2009).

John B. Kelly Jr. won the Diamond Sculls at Henley in 1947 and 1949. Jack Jr., as he was also known, won the James E. Sullivan Award as the best amateur athlete in the U.S. in 1947 for his accomplishments. He would go on to represent the United States at the 1948, 1952, 1956 and 1960 Olympic Games. Jack Jr. won the bronze medal in the single scull at the 1956 Olympics. He continued to be involved in amateur sports, eventually being appointed President of the United States Olympic Committee shortly before his sudden death from a heart attack in 1985.

Kelly's daughter Grace was an Academy Award-winning actress who became Princess Consort of Monaco when she married Prince Rainier in 1956. Kelly purportedly gave Prince Rainier a $2 million dowry for his daughter's marriage. Kelly is the maternal grandfather of Albert II, the reigning prince of Monaco. When Grace's engagement to Prince Rainier was announced, Kelly quipped: "I told the Prince that royalty didn't mean that much to us, and that I hoped he wouldn't run around the way some Princes do." Kelly was the model for the character of George Kittredge, Tracy Lord's brash, up-and-coming, man-of-the-people fiancé, in Philip Barry's 1939 Broadway comedy The Philadelphia Story. Grace Kelly played Tracy Lord in the 1956 Cole Porter movie musical version, High Society. Grace visited her grandfather's cottage, the Kelly homestead, near Newport, County Mayo during her 1961 state visit to Ireland.

== Later life ==
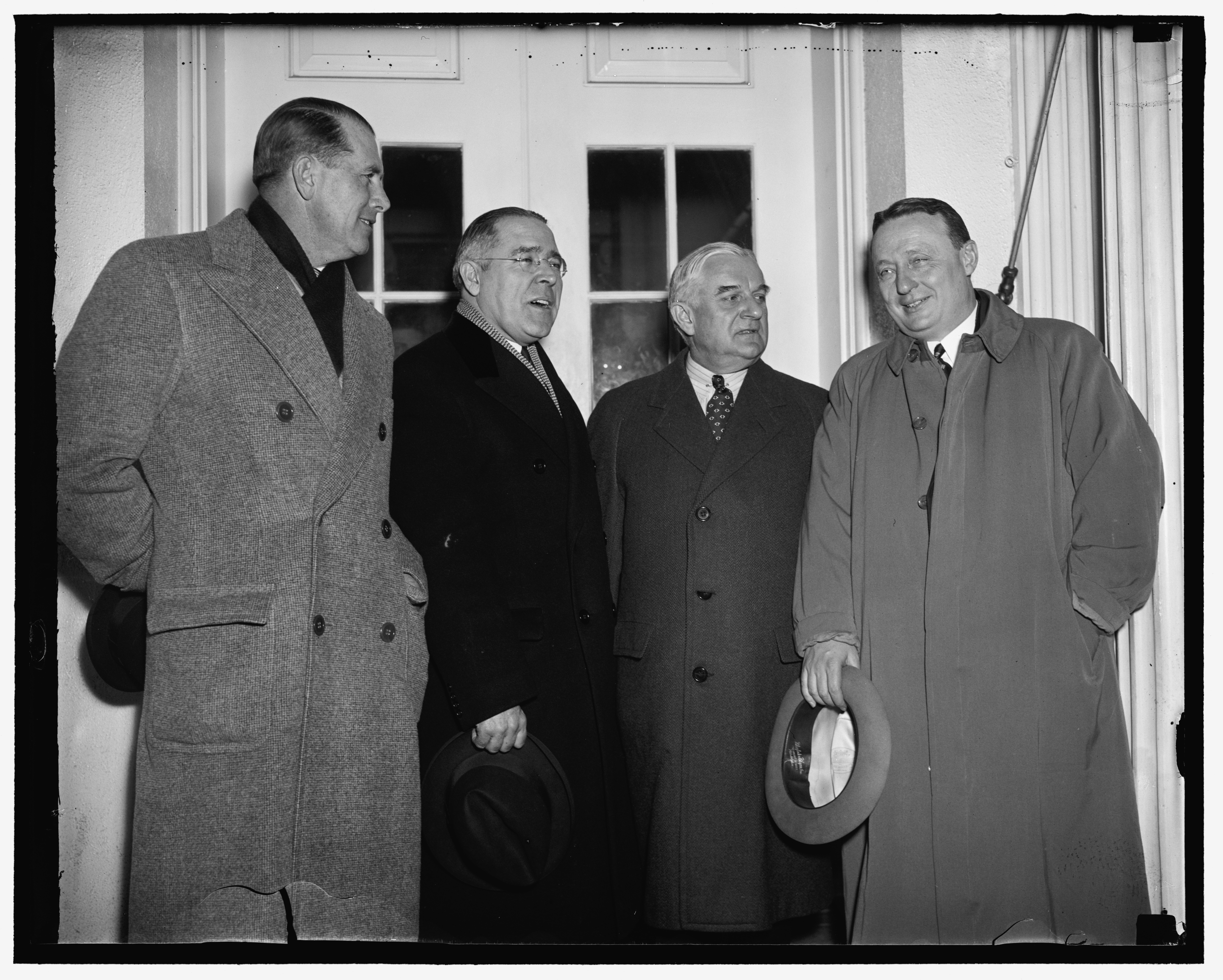
Left to right: Kelly, David L. Lawrence (chair of the Pennsylvania Democratic Party), Joseph F. Guffey (United States senator from Pennsylvania), and George Howard Earle III (governor of Pennsylvania) visiting the White House in 1937 to request a $60,000,000 Public Works Administration grant for Pennsylvania from President Franklin D. Roosevelt (not pictured)

Kelly was actively involved in city politics, ran for mayor of Philadelphia in 1935 and chaired the Philadelphia County Democratic Party in 1937. When he ran for mayor, Philadelphia was a heavily Republican city, but he came close to winning, losing by fewer than 50,000 votes compared with the usual margin of 300,000. From January 1936 until June 1937, Kelly served as Pennsylvania secretary of revenue under Governor George Howard Earle III.

Kelly was a commissioner and later president of the Fairmount Park Commission, which administered Fairmount Park in Philadelphia, one of the largest municipal parks in the world. In 1941, President Roosevelt named the still-popular Kelly as the National Physical Fitness Director, a post he held throughout World War II. Kelly strongly advocated for physical fitness for all Americans, particularly those brought into the military.

Kelly was Commodore of the Schuylkill Navy from 1935 to 1940 and was president of the NAAO, the then governing board for U.S. rowing, from 1954 through 1955. Kelly is the only rower who is a member of the U.S. Olympic Hall of Fame. He is also a member of the United States Rowing Hall of Fame, having been elected in 1956 at the same time as his son Jack Jr.

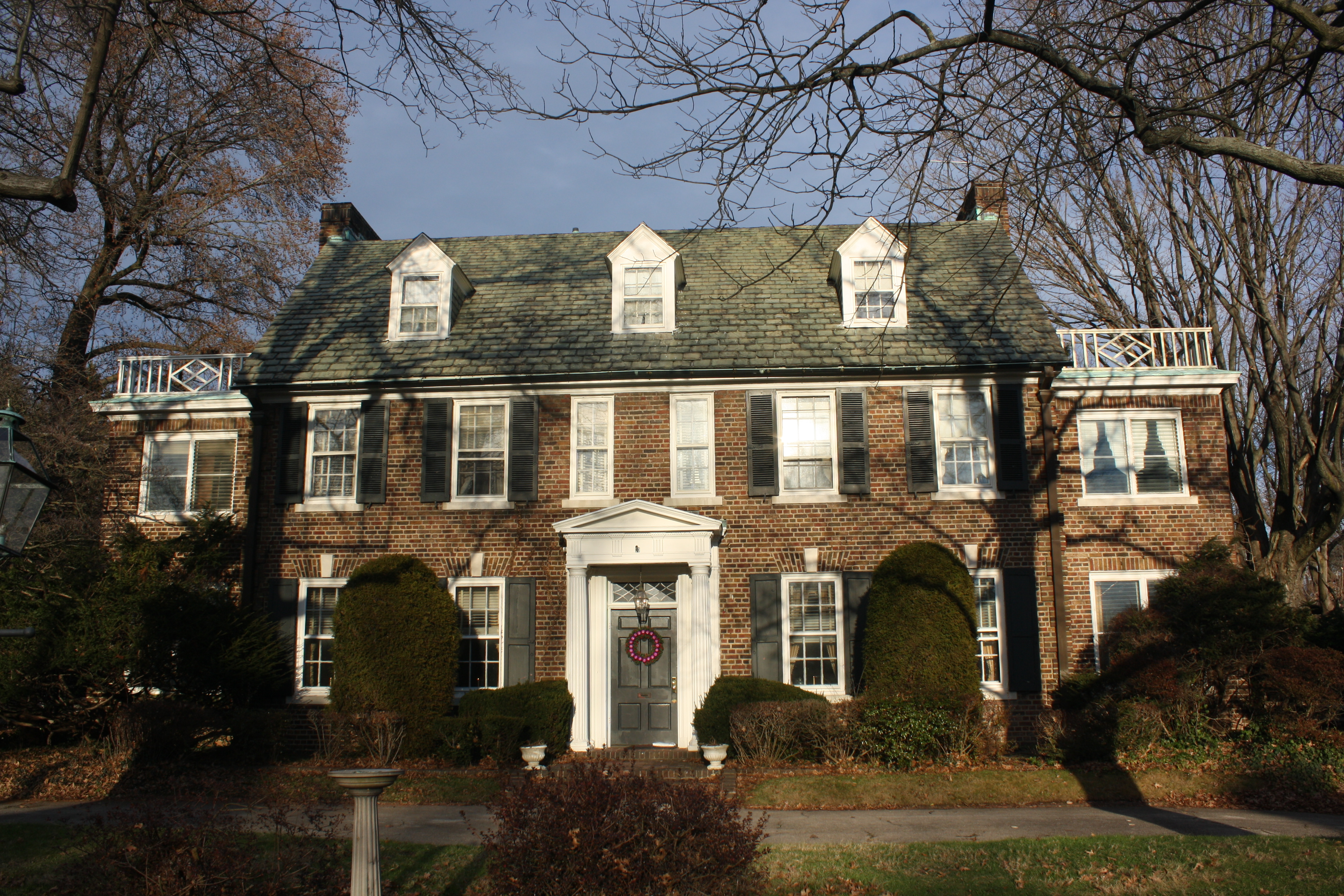
The Kelly family house in East Falls was built by John B. Kelly in 1929.

Kelly died of intestinal cancer at his home in Philadelphia, age 70. He was interred at Holy Sepulchre Cemetery in Cheltenham, Pennsylvania.

In 1967, Philadelphia erected a prominent statue of Kelly by artist Harry Rosin near the finish line of the Schuylkill River course that Kelly rowed. It is located just off of the scenic Kelly Drive, formerly East River Drive, which is named for Kelly's son, Jack Jr. Every year, USRowing, as the governing board is now known, bestows the Jack Kelly Award on an individual who represents the ideals that Kelly exemplified, including superior achievement in rowing, service to amateur athletics and success in their chosen profession.

== Achievements and awards ==
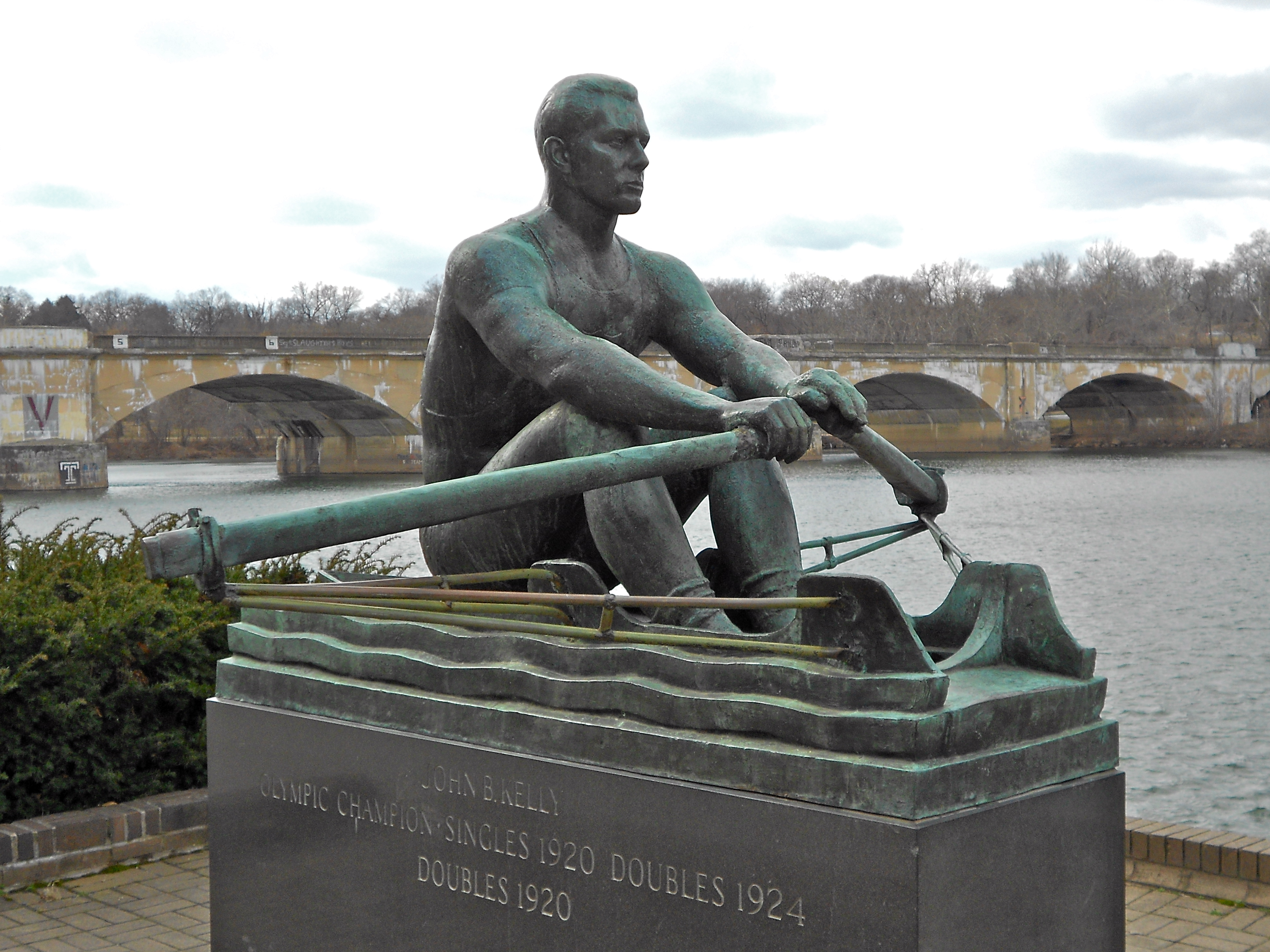
Sculpture of Kelly in Fairmount Park, Philadelphia

- Gold Medal, Single Scull, 1920 Olympic Games
- Gold Medal, Double Scull, 1920 Olympic Games
- Gold Medal, Double Scull, 1924 Olympic Games
- 126 consecutive victories in the single scull
- Member, United States Olympic Hall of Fame
- Member, United States Rowing Hall of Fame, Single Scull (elected 1956 at the same time as his son, Jack Jr.)
- Member, United States Rowing Hall of Fame, Double Scull (elected 1956)
- National Physical Fitness Director (World War II)
- Member Philadelphia Sports Hall of Fame, (elected in the charter class of 2003 with Wilt Chamberlain, Joe Frazier, Jimmie Foxx, et al.)
