= Margaret Majer =

American women's physical education instructor (1898–1990)

- Born: Margaret Katherine Majer; December 13, 1898
- Died: January 6, 1990 (aged 91); Linwood, New Jersey, U.S.
- Occupation: Physical education instructor
- Known for: First coach of women's teams at the University of Pennsylvania
- Spouse: John B. Kelly Sr. (m. 1924; died 1960)
- Children: Margaret; Jack Jr.; Grace; Elizabeth

Margaret Majer Kelly (born Margaret Katherine Majer; December 13, 1898 – January 6, 1990) was an American instructor of physical education for women and first coach of women's teams at the University of Pennsylvania.

Majer was the wife of Jack B. Kelly, three-time Olympic Gold Medal winner in rowing, mother of Grace Kelly, actress and Princess Consort of Monaco, and mother of Jack Jr., an Olympic rower.

== Early life and education ==
Margaret Katherine Majer was born on December 13, 1898, the daughter of German immigrants Margaretha Berg and Carl Majer. She and her two siblings grew up in the Strawberry Mansion neighborhood of Philadelphia. She attended William Penn High School for Girls with the great-grandmother of the Fine Brothers, and in 1917 was class president.

== Academic career ==
After graduating with a B.A. from Temple University in 1921, Majer succeeded Ethel Loring as an instructor in Physical Education for Women at the University of Pennsylvania's College for Women. She led the undergraduate women in athletic pursuits at the Kingsessing facility, used as a gymnasium by the university's female students. While teaching at the university, Majer became the first coach of women's athletic teams at the university, organizing and training a women's basketball team and scheduling the first intercollegiate competitions for women. The women's basketball team played eight opponents in its first year, including Bryn Mawr College, Drexel University, and Temple University. Teams in gymnastics, softball, swimming, and tennis were planned for the next year.

Majer led a successful fundraising campaign to build women's tennis courts on what, for a few years, was a vacant lot on the southeast corner of Thirty-Fourth and Walnut streets.

Margaret Majer was celebrated as the founder of women's athletics at the University of Pennsylvania, and her achievements brought her recognition as the first director of women's athletics at the University of Pennsylvania.

== Marriage and children ==
Majer met Olympic oarsman John Brendan Kelly at the Turngemeinde Athletic and Social Club when she was 14 and he was 23. She later recalled, "When we first met, we did not really take each other very seriously... But Jack would take me home from the club some nights, and some days he would pick me up after school. Our courtship began in earnest when he came home from World War One." They married in 1924, ten years after they first met. Kelly, the son of an Irish Catholic immigrant and ten years her senior, won a gold medal for sculling in the 1920 Olympics. After working in the brickmaking businesses of two older brothers, Kelly started his own business, eventually becoming a millionaire. He was also involved in politics, and after serving as Democratic City chairman, he ran unsuccessfully as the Democratic candidate for Mayor of Philadelphia in 1935. He would also have run for senator however Majer discouraged him from doing so.

Majer's family was Lutheran, and she converted to Catholicism before the marriage. She and Kelly had four children: Margaret "Peggy" Katherine (1925–1991), John "Kell" Brendan Jr. (1927–1985), Grace Patricia (1929–1982) and Elizabeth "Lizanne" Anne (1933–2009). Via Grace, Majer is the maternal grandmother of Albert II, Prince of Monaco.

== Later life ==
After her children were all in school, Kelly became active in various civic organizations. In 1935, she began a long association with the Woman's Medical College of Pennsylvania, serving on its auxiliary and board of corporators. Majer believed in the necessity for training women doctors. She went on to chair the college's development program and later received an honorary doctor of letters from the school. In recognition of her contributions, the Woman's Medical College named a section of the hospital for her.

She served as a member of the Philadelphia Board of Education from 1961 to 1964 and as a leader of volunteer boards and groups associated with the Philadelphia Association for Retarded Children, Moss Rehabilitation Hospital and the Committee for Philadelphia House. Majer was also recognized in the Distinguished Daughters of Pennsylvania

Kelly died of pneumonia on January 6, 1990, in Linwood, New Jersey.
