= Eduardo Risso (rower) =

Uruguayan rower (1925–1986)

Olympic medal record

Men's rowing

Representing Uruguay
Silver medal – second place	1948 London	Single sculls

Eduardo G. Risso Salaverría (25 February 1925 – 12 January 1986) was a Uruguayan rower, who represented his native country at the 1948 Summer Olympics in London, United Kingdom. There he won the silver medal in the men's single sculls event, behind Australia's Mervyn Wood. He also competed at the 1952 Summer Olympics.
