= Curt Brunnqvist =

Swedish rower

Personal information
- Born: Curt Allan Brunnqvist; 5 December 1924 Stockholm
- Died: 20 September 2016 (aged 91) Stockholm

Sport
- Sport: Rowing
Medal record
Men's rowing
Representing Sweden
European Rowing Championships
Bronze medal – third place	1951 Mâcon	Double sculls

Curt Allan Brunnqvist (5 December 1924 – 20 September 2016) was a Swedish rower who competed in the 1948 Summer Olympics and in the 1952 Summer Olympics.
