= George Duncan Rowe =

British stockbroker (1857–1934)

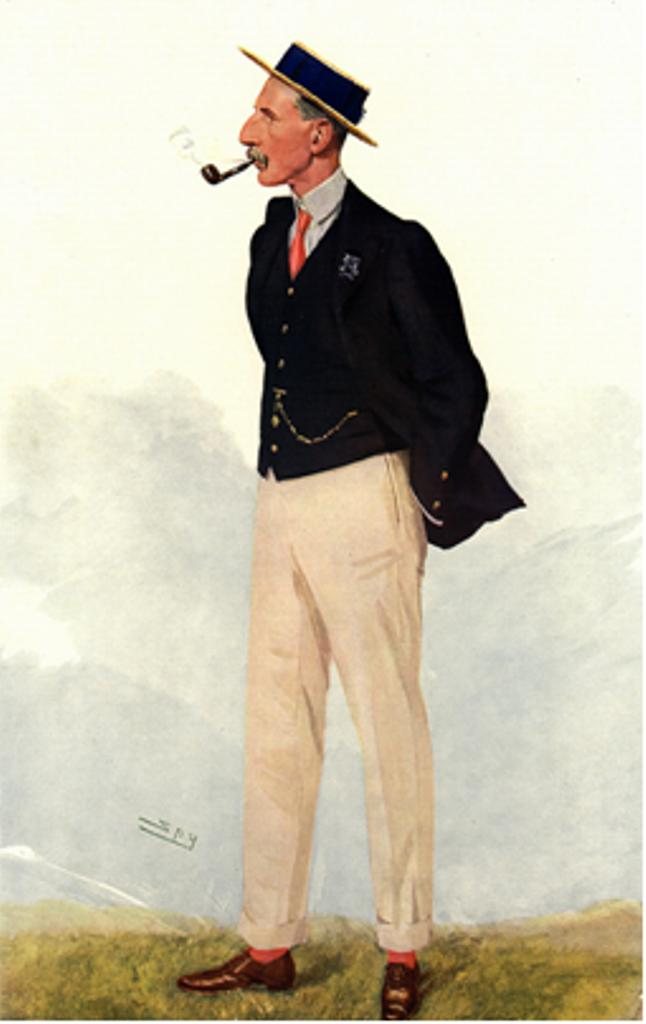
- Spy cartoon of Rowe in Vanity Fair, 1906
- Born: 1857; Valparaíso, Chile
- Died: 1934 (aged 76–77)
- Education: Marlborough College
- Alma mater: University of Oxford
- Occupation: stockbroker
- Known for: Co-founder of Rowe & Pitman
- Spouse: Frances
- Children: 7, including Antony Rowe

George Duncan Rowe (1857–1934) was a British stockbroker, and the co-founder of Rowe & Pitman, with Frederick I. Pitman.

== Life ==
He was the born in Valparaíso, Chile, the son of Charles Rowe, a Liverpool shipowner. He was educated at Marlborough College, followed by University College, Oxford, where he was a keen rower.

Rowe married Frances, a violinist, and they had seven children, including the rower Antony Rowe.
