= Rowe & Pitman =

Former British stockbroker

- Industry: Stockbroker
- Founded: 1895
- Founder: George Duncan Rowe; Fred Pitman
- Fate: Acquired by S.G. Warburg (1986)
- Headquarters: London

Rowe & Pitman was once one of the largest British stockbrokers.

== History ==
The firm was founded in London in 1895 by stockbrokers George Duncan Rowe and Fred Pitman. It was known in the city as "R & P". In the 1950s, two of the firm's biggest clients were the South African companies Anglo-American Corporation and De Beers Consolidated Mines.

The firm was one of the largest stockbrokers in the City of London in the mid twentieth century before it was taken over by S.G. Warburg in 1986.
