= Jack Kelly Jr. (rower) =

American rower (1927–1985)

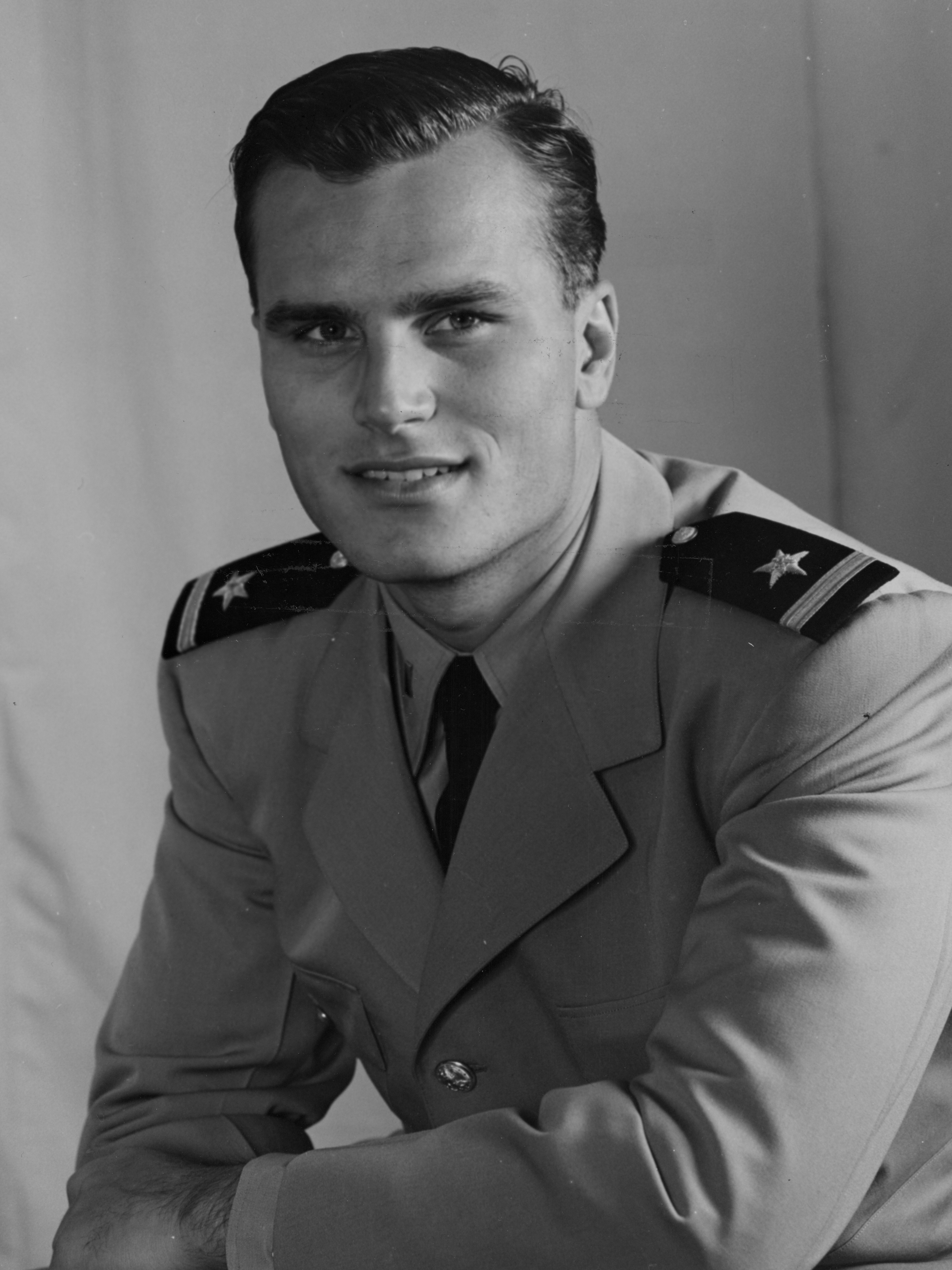
- Kelly in 1951

President of the United States Olympic Committee
- In office February 9, 1985 – March 2, 1985
- Preceded by: William E. Simon
- Succeeded by: Robert Helmick

Philadelphia City Councilman At-Large
- In office 1967–1979

Personal details
- Born: John Brendan Kelly Jr. May 24, 1927 Philadelphia, Pennsylvania, U.S.
- Died: March 2, 1985 (aged 57) Philadelphia, Pennsylvania, U.S.
- Resting place: Holy Sepulchre Cemetery, Cheltenham Township, Pennsylvania, U.S.
- Party: Democratic
- Spouse(s): Mary Gray Freeman (m. 1954; div. 1980) Sandra Worley (m. 1981)
- Parent(s): Margaret Majer; John B. Kelly Sr.
- Relatives: Grace Kelly (sister)
- Education: University of Pennsylvania (BA)
- Nicknames: Kell Kelly; Jack Kelly

Military service
- Allegiance: United States
- Branch/service: United States Navy
- Sports career
- Height: 185 cm (6 ft 1 in)
- Weight: 83 kg (183 lb)
- Sport: Rowing
- Club: Vesper Boat Club
Medal record
Representing the United States
Olympic Games
Bronze medal – third place	1956 Melbourne	Single sculls
Pan American Games
Gold medal – first place	1955 Mexico city	Single sculls
Gold medal – first place	1959 Chicago	Double sculls
European Rowing Championships
Gold medal – first place	1949 Amsterdam	Single sculls
Silver medal – second place	1958 Poznań	Eights

John Brendan Kelly Jr. (May 24, 1927 – March 2, 1985), also known as Kell Kelly, was an American athlete, rower, and Olympic medalist. He was the son of triple Olympic gold medal winner Jack Kelly Sr., and the elder brother of the actress and Princess of Monaco, Grace Kelly. In 1947, Kelly was awarded the James E. Sullivan Award as the top amateur athlete in the United States. He had become president of the United States Olympic Committee shortly before his death.

Kelly was also a politician, and served as an at-large member of the Philadelphia City Council.

== Early life and family ==
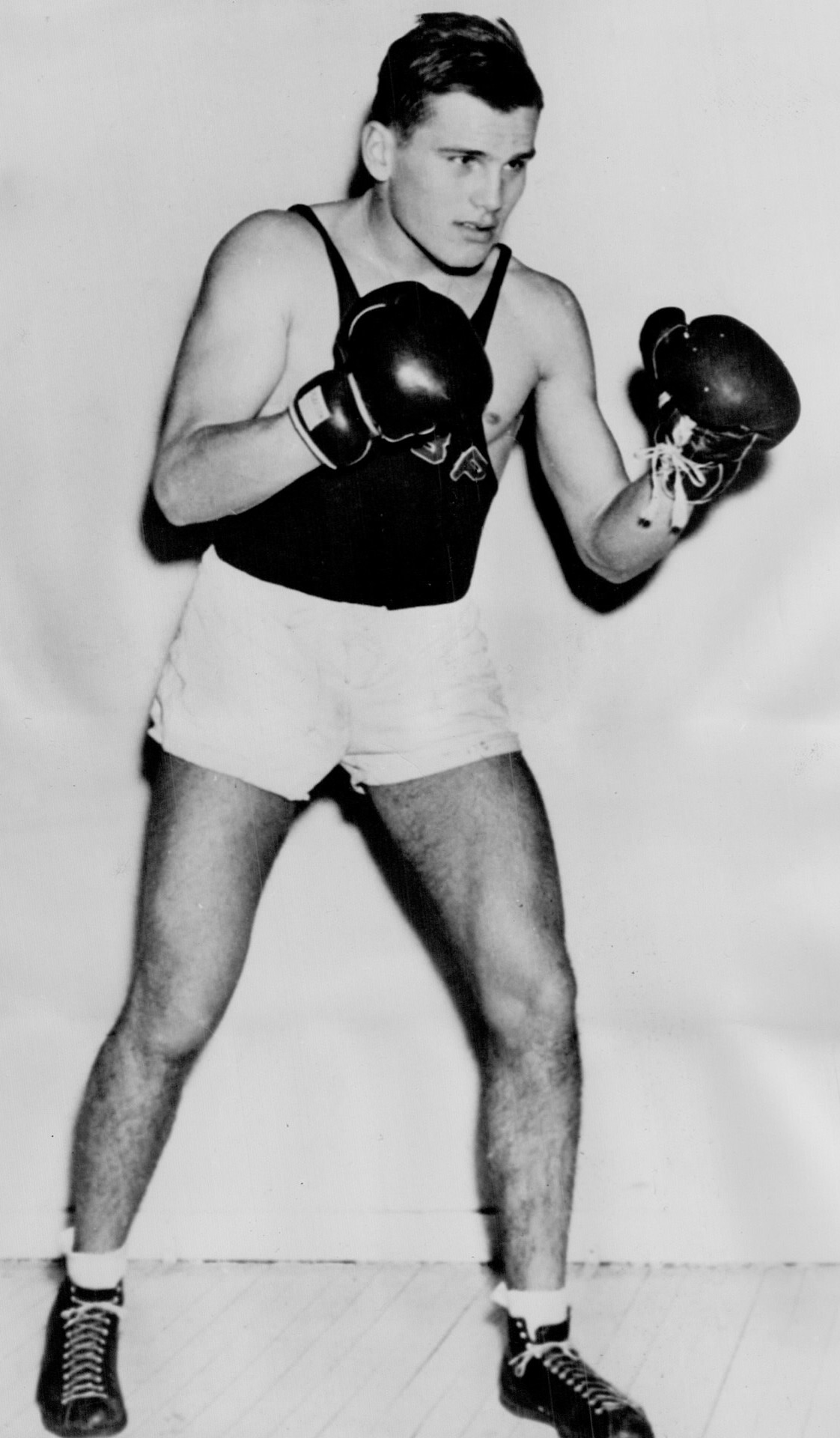
Kelly in 1945

Kelly was born in Philadelphia, Pennsylvania, the second child and only son of Margaret Katherine Majer and John Kelly Sr. His paternal grandparents were Irish immigrants, with his grandfather from County Mayo, Ireland. John Sr. was the son of a farmer; he started his own bricklaying business, "Kelly for Brickwork", and became a multimillionaire. His mother's parents were German and emigrated to the United States. Before her marriage, his mother Margaret was a model and competitive swimmer. She converted from Protestantism to Roman Catholicism when she married. Kelly's uncle George Kelly was a Pulitzer Prize-winning playwright.

Kelly had an older sister Margaret (born September 1925 and nicknamed "Peggy") and two younger sisters, Grace (born November 1929) and Elizabeth Anne (born June 1933 and nicknamed "Lizanne"). Kelly's younger sister Grace would go on to become an Academy Award-winning film actress and marry Rainier III, Prince of Monaco in 1956. Kelly's nephew is Monaco's current monarch Prince Albert II. The children were raised in a 17-room house on 3901 Henry Avenue in East Falls, Philadelphia.

Kelly graduated from William Penn Charter School and enlisted in the United States Navy, where he served during World War II. He was stationed at the United States Naval Training Center Bainbridge. Kelly graduated from the University of Pennsylvania in 1950 and rowed for the varsity team.

== Sports and rowing ==
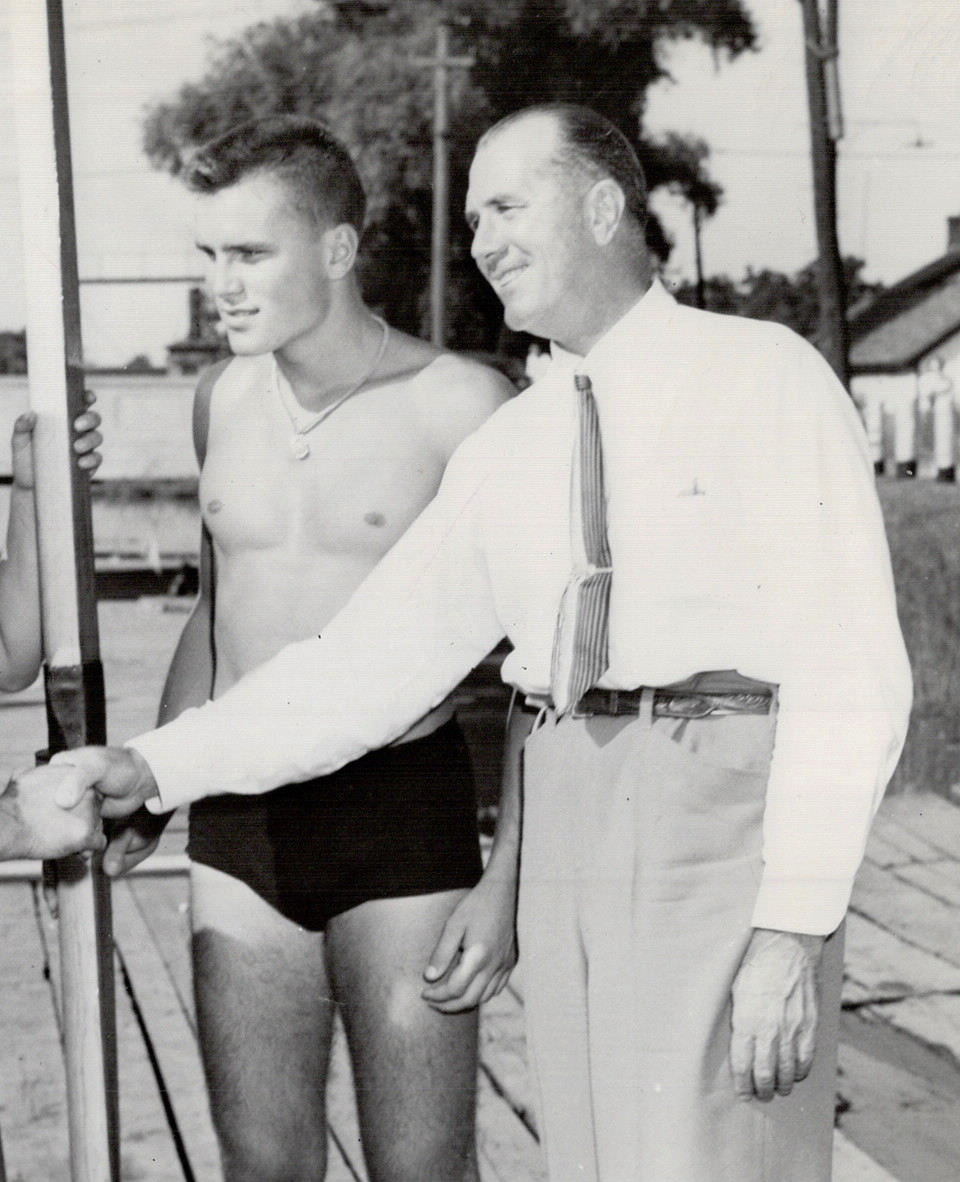
Kelly with father in 1945

A rower who specialized in the single scull (1x), Kelly represented the United States at the 1948 Summer Olympics in London, England, United Kingdom; the 1952 Summer Olympics in Helsinki, Finland; and the 1956 Summer Olympics in Melbourne, Australia (winning the bronze medal). In the double scull (2x), he represented the United States at the 1960 Summer Olympics in Rome, Italy. He also won gold medals at the 1955 and 1959 Pan American Games and 1949 European Championships.

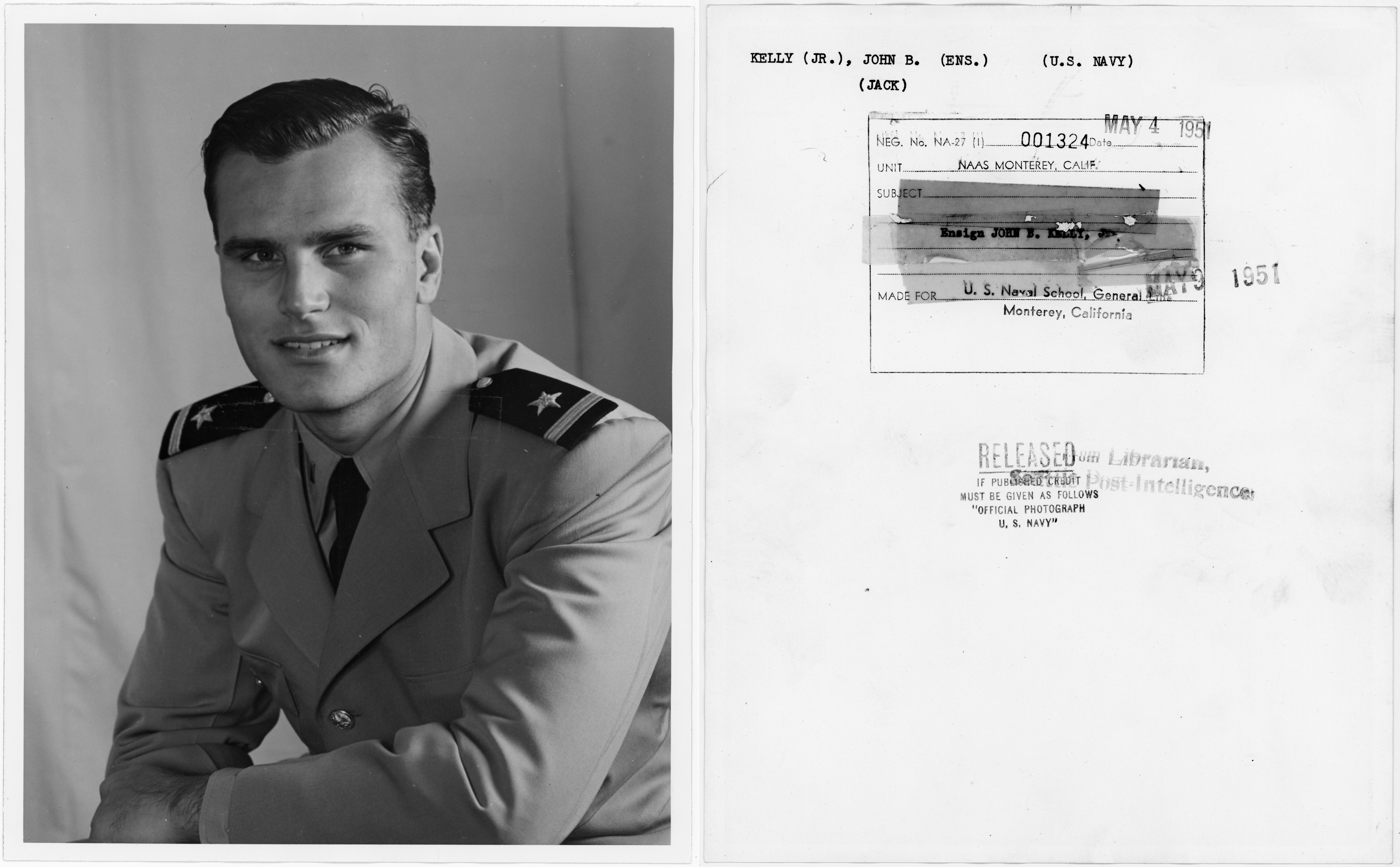
Ensign John B. Kelly Jr., U.S. Navy

=== Kelly at Henley ===
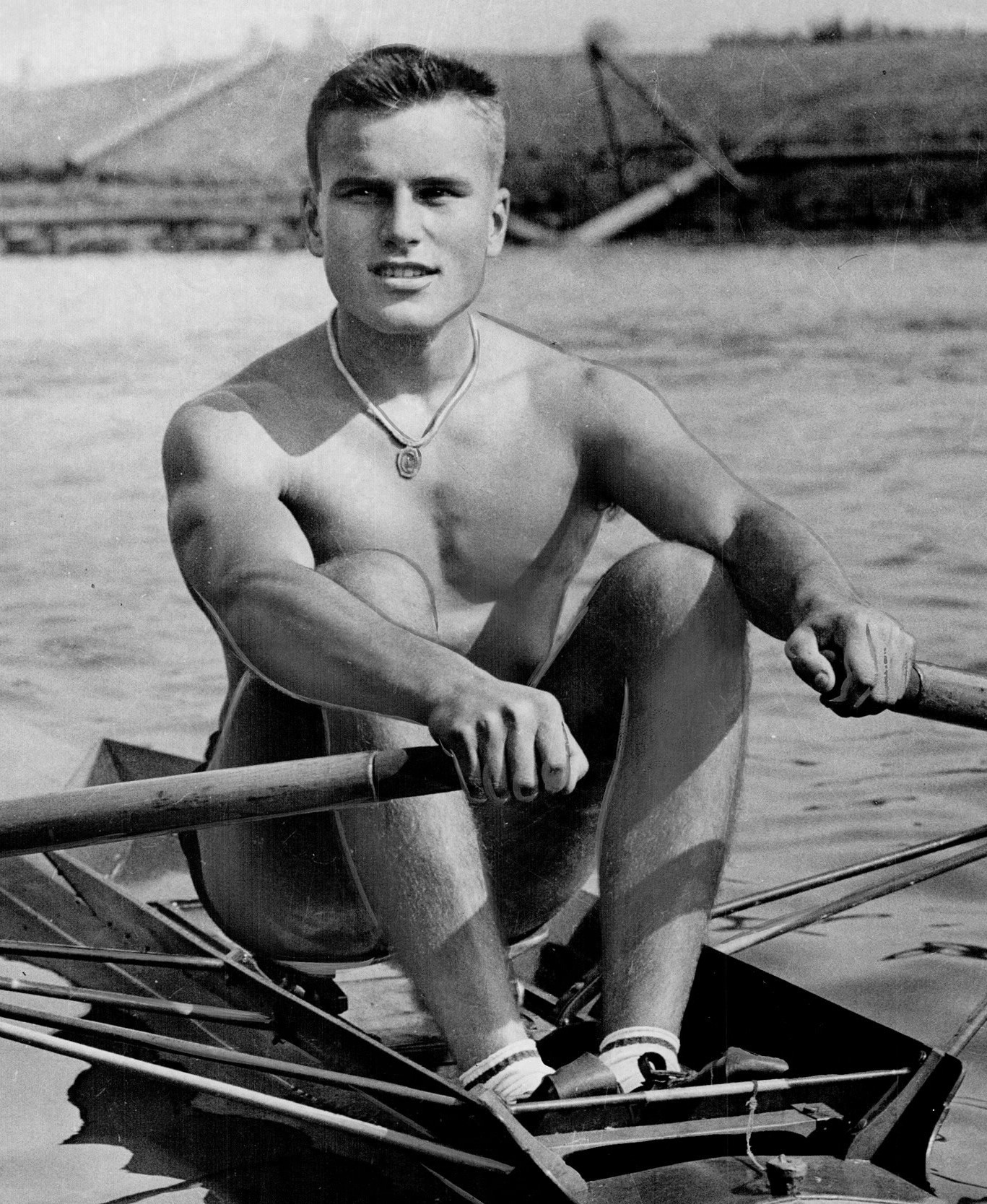
Kelly in 1945

Kelly's father, John B. Kelly Sr., won two gold medals at the 1920 Summer Olympics, capturing both the single scull (1x) and the double scull (2x). The senior Kelly repeated his victory in the double scull at the 1924 Summer Olympics. In 1920, despite his accomplishments as a rower, the senior Kelly's entry was rejected at the then most prestigious rowing event in the world, the Henley Royal Regatta. According to the minutes of the regatta's Committee of Management, Kelly was excluded for two reasons: first, because having worked as a bricklayer he was not eligible under the regatta's then rules on amateurism (which excluded anyone "...who is or ever has been … by trade or employment for wages a mechanic, artisan or labourer") and second because he was a member of Vesper Boat Club which was banned in 1906 after members of their 1905 crew raised money through a public subscription to pay for their travel expenses. Kelly's exclusion was widely reported in newspapers in both the UK and US, with many seeing it as an attempt to prevent an American from winning the prestigious Diamond Challenge Sculls event in England. Only one American, Edward Ten Eyck, had previously won the event, in 1897.

In 1947, Kelly Jr. won the Diamond Challenge Sculls (single scull) at the Henley, the event from which his father had been excluded. In recognition of his accomplishment, Kelly was awarded the 1947 James E. Sullivan Award as the top amateur athlete in the United States. In 1949 Kelly repeated his feat and again won the Diamond Challenge Sculls at Henley. In 1980, Kelly's sister Princess Grace of Monaco was invited to present the trophies at the Regatta. In 2003, the Princess Grace Challenge Cup named in her honour was first presented. In 2004, Grace's son (and Kelly's nephew) Prince Albert of Monaco presented the trophies at the Regatta.

=== Kelly at the Olympics ===
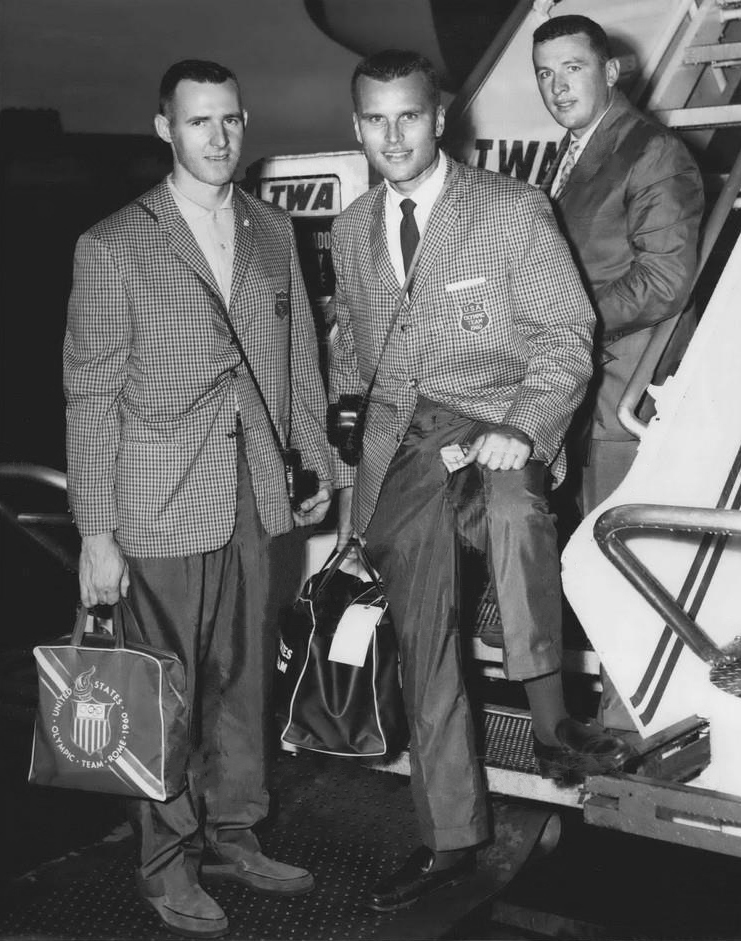
Kelly (center) in 1960

At the 1948 Summer Olympics in London, Kelly competed on the same Henley course where he had won the Diamond Challenge Sculls the year before. Kelly won his opening heat, but did not make the finals after finishing second to eventual silver medalist Eduardo Risso in the semi-finals. (Due to course width constrictions, the Henley course could only handle a 3 boat final).

At the 1952 Summer Olympics in Helsinki, Kelly again won his opening heat. In the semi-final, which was one to qualify, Kelly finished second to eventual champion Yuriy Tyukalov, and Kelly was relegated to the repechage, or second-chance race, which was also one to qualify for the final. In the repechage, Kelly's main competitor was Teodor Kocerka of Poland. They fought all the way down the course with Kocerka, who would go on to win the bronze medal, prevailing in a close finish.

At the 1956 Summer Olympics in Melbourne, Kelly won his Olympic medal, a bronze. He was beaten by two teenage prodigies, Vyacheslav Ivanov of Russia and Stuart Mackenzie of Australia, but Kelly beat Teodor Kocerka, who had beaten Kelly four years earlier. Kelly gave the medal to his sister Grace, who married Prince Rainier earlier that year, as a wedding present. He would later quip that he had hoped it would have been a different color.

In 1960, Kelly competed in the double scull at his final Olympics in Rome. His boat would be eliminated in the repechage.

=== Later career in management ===
In 1964, following his retirement from rowing, Kelly acted as manager for the United States Olympic 8-man boat. It was composed of rowers from the Vesper Boat Club, to which Kelly also belonged. That boat won a gold medal at the 1964 Summer Olympics in Tokyo. In 1968, Kelly served as a member of the national committee for the modern pentathlon.

Kelly became a passionate advocate for athletes. He was elected president of the Amateur Athletic Union in 1970 and stirred controversy by arguing that the amateur code had become outmoded, thereby helping free the Olympics from sham amateurism.

In 1974, Kelly headed a group of Philadelphia business men who became owners of the Philadelphia Bell, a franchise in the now defunct World Football League. Kelly's name and connections were important in giving the franchise legitimacy and in negotiating agreements with the city of Philadelphia. However, as the first season progressed, Kelly stepped aside as the team president in favor of John Bosacco, who owned a controlling interest in the franchise.

In February 1985, Kelly was elected president of the United States Olympic Committee. The appointment was short-lived – Kelly died three weeks later. Kelly was posthumously inducted into the United States Olympic & Paralympic Hall of Fame as a contributor. Kelly and his father are the only parent-child duo in the Olympic Hall of Fame.

== Business career ==
Kelly led John B. Kelly Incorporated, the bricklaying company founded by his father. Kelly also served as director of Lincoln National Bank.

== Civic leadership and political career ==
Kelly was president of the effort to organize a world's fair in Philadelphia to be held in the American Bicentennial year of 1976. Kelly served as president and director of the Philadelphia Athletic Club, as well as the director of the Pennsylvania Ballet. For many years, Kelly played the role of George Washington in the annual Christmas Day reenactment of the famous 1776 crossing of the Delaware River. The re-enactors would cross over from Pennsylvania to New Jersey on Christmas afternoon. As a philanthropist, Kelly regularly gave a significant amount of money to charities. These charities included several funds belonging to the University of Pennsylvania.

Kelly was actively involved in politics and served for 12 years as a Democratic City Councilman-At-Large in Philadelphia, from 1967 to 1979. Kelly also served on the Fairmount Park Commission.

== Personal life ==
Kelly's first wife was Mary Gray Freeman (now known as Mary Spitzer). Daughter of Monroe Edward Freeman and Christine Gray, she was the 1951 national women's champion in swimming and a member of the United States swimming team for the 1952 Olympics at Helsinki (she appeared on the cover of Life on July 23, 1951). They married in 1954 and had six children, including John B. Kelly III, Susan von Medicus, and Elizabeth "Liz" Kelly. Kelly and Freeman divorced in 1980.

In 1975, Kelly's well-publicized relationship with a transgender woman, Rachel Harlow, saw some members of the public oppose his candidacy in the mayoral election.

On May 28, 1981, Kelly married Sandra Lee Worley, a banker. She was the daughter of Laura Kristine Worley and Chief Warrant Officer Russell Edwin. They remained married until Kelly's death in 1985.

== Death ==
On the morning of March 2, 1985, Kelly suffered a fatal heart attack while jogging to The Athletic Club in Philadelphia after his customary morning row on the Schuylkill River. His body was discovered on 18th and Callowhill Street shortly after 9:30 am. Kelly was taken to Hahnemann University Hospital where he was pronounced dead.

Jack Kelly Jr.'s private funeral was held in Philadelphia. Among the attendees were his brother-in-law Rainier III, Prince of Monaco, his nieces Princess Caroline and Princess Stéphanie, his nephew Prince Albert, then Philadelphia mayor Wilson Goode and former Philadelphia mayors William J. Green, III and Frank Rizzo. John Kelly Jr. is buried at the Holy Sepulchre Cemetery in Cheltenham Township, Pennsylvania.

== Achievements and awards ==
- Diamond Scull, Henley Royal Regatta, 1947 and 1949
- James E. Sullivan Award Winner in 1947
- Member of the US Olympic team in 1948, 1952, 1956, and 1960
- Olympic Bronze Medalist in Single Scull, 1956
- 8-time United States National Champion, single scull
- Member of the US rowing Hall of Fame, elected 1956
- Manager for the 1964 Olympic Gold Medal eight man boat
- President of the United States Olympic Committee
- United States Olympic Hall of Fame, as a contributor
- Olympic Order in Silver
- City Councilman (Democrat-Philadelphia)

== Legacy ==
- Kelly Drive, Philadelphia, formerly East River Drive, was renamed in his honor after his death. Boathouse Row is located here.
